= Laurie Strode =

Fictional character from the Halloween franchise

- Halloween character
- Jamie Lee Curtis as Laurie Strode in Halloween (1978)
- First appearance: Halloween (1978)
- Last appearance: Halloween: The Game (2026)
- Created by: John Carpenter; Debra Hill
- Portrayed by: 1978–2022; Jamie Lee Curtis; Nichole Drucker (young, Halloween II) 2007–2009; Scout Taylor-Compton; Uncredited baby (infant)
- Voiced by: Catherine Lecours (Dead by Daylight); Chelsea Krause (Halloween: The Game)

In-universe information
- Full name: 1981–2002; Laurie Strode (née Cynthia Myers); Keri Tate; 2007–2009; Laurie Strode (née Angel Myers)
- Title: She Who Will Not Die
- Occupation: 1978–1981; Student; Babysitter H20; Headmistress Remake: Student; Babysitter
- Children: 1988–1995: Jamie Lloyd (daughter; deceased) H20: John Tate (son) 2018–2022: Karen Nelson (daughter; deceased)
- Relatives: Original: Judith Myers (biological sister; deceased) Michael Myers (biological brother) Peter/Don Myers (biological father; deceased) Edith/Deborah Myers (biological mother; deceased) Pamela Strode (adopted mother; deceased) Morgan Strode (adopted father; deceased) John Strode (adopted uncle; deceased) Debra Strode (adopted aunt; deceased) Tim Strode (adopted cousin; deceased) Kara Strode (adopted cousin) Danny Strode (adopted first cousin once removed) 2018–2022: Karen Nelson (daughter; deceased) Ray Nelson (son-in-law; deceased) Allyson Nelson (granddaughter)
- Status: Alive (Continuity A and Universal/Blumhouse continuity); Deceased (Continuity B and H20)

Laurie Strode is a character from the Halloween series. She first appeared in Halloween (1978) as a high school student who becomes targeted by serial killer Michael Myers, in which she was portrayed by Jamie Lee Curtis. Created by John Carpenter and Debra Hill, Laurie appeared in nine of thirteen films in the series (and is seen briefly in photographs and video footage in at least two others). The character has subsequently been represented in various other media, including novels, video games, and comic books.

Most entries in the franchise depict Laurie as Michael's younger sister, although this detail is not present in the first film and was also disregarded by the most recent entries - the 2018 film and its two sequels. The character is primarily portrayed by Jamie Lee Curtis, who appears as Laurie in the original film and six of its sequels. In the two films directed by Rob Zombie, she is played by Scout Taylor-Compton. Academic materials widely cite Laurie as one of the early - and more influential - examples of the now-classic trope, that of the final girl within slasher film archetype.

== Appearances ==
=== Films ===
==== Continuity A (1978–95) ====
Laurie Strode first appears in the original Halloween (1978). The 17-year-old Laurie (Curtis) is a high school student who has plans to babysit Tommy Doyle (Brian Andrews) on Halloween night, 1978. However, throughout the day, she keeps seeing a mysterious masked man watching her wherever she goes; unbeknownst to her, he is Michael Myers (Nick Castle), an escaped mental patient who murdered his sister, Judith Myers (Sandy Johnson), fifteen years before and has begun stalking her. Laurie notices Michael watching her and becomes increasingly worried, though her best friends Annie (Nancy Loomis) and Lynda (P. J. Soles) brush off her concerns. As Laurie babysits Tommy, Myers kills Annie and Lynda in the house across the street. Growing concerned when they fail to call her, Laurie goes to investigate and sees their corpses laid out for her to find, before being attacked by Michael. Barely escaping, Laurie races back to the Doyle house. Michael follows, but Laurie manages to fend him off long enough for Tommy and Lindsey to escape. Laurie is saved by Dr. Sam Loomis (Donald Pleasence), Michael's psychiatrist, who shoots him off the balcony; when Loomis goes to check Michael's body, he finds it missing. An unsurprised Loomis stares off into the night, while Laurie begins sobbing in terror.

Halloween II (1981) picks up directly after the first film, with Laurie Strode being taken to a hospital. She learns who was trying to kill her and has dreams of her mother telling her she was adopted and visiting Michael when they were children. Waking up, she begins to roam the hallways of the hospital until coming face to face with The Shape, who has been killing the hospital staff in search of her. Meanwhile, Dr. Loomis discovers that Laurie is Michael and Judith's sister; she was put up for adoption after the death of their parents, with the records sealed to protect the family. Realizing that Michael has killed one sister and now wants to kill the other, Loomis rushes to the hospital to find them. Laurie shoots Michael in the eyes, blinding him, and Loomis causes an explosion in the operating theater, allowing Laurie to escape. Michael, engulfed in flames, stumbles out of the room before finally collapsing. The traumatized Laurie is last seen being transferred to another hospital, along with another survivor, Jimmy (as seen in the television version).

In Halloween 4: The Return of Michael Myers (1988), Laurie is revealed to have died prior to the film's events, with the role of protagonist taken up by her young daughter, Jamie Lloyd (Danielle Harris). A photograph of Jamie Lee Curtis as Laurie appears in a scene where Jamie remembers her mother. The character of Jamie would go on to reappear in two more Halloween sequels, while Laurie's adoptive cousin Kara (Marianne Hagan) and her family appear in Halloween: The Curse of Michael Myers (1995).

==== Continuity B (1978–81; 1998–2002) ====
Curtis returned as Laurie Strode in Halloween H20: 20 Years Later (1998), the seventh film in the series. The screenplay was based on a story by Kevin Williamson. The story was conceived as a sequel to the sixth film, thereby keeping the timeline's continuity, but producers ultimately decided to go with a reboot and ignore the previous three films. In this timeline, Laurie faked her death in a car accident as a way of escaping her murderous brother, whose body was not found after Halloween II. She is now living under the name Keri Tate, and works as the headmistress of a California private school, where her teenage son John (Josh Hartnett) is a student. Laurie, who by now has become an alcoholic, is still haunted by memories of her brother's rampage, and lives in fear that he will return. Although John dismisses her as paranoid, her fears become reality when Michael (Chris Durand) resurfaces on Halloween and murders two of John's classmates. After getting her son and his girlfriend to safety, Laurie decides to stop running and face her brother. She stops Michael, but, unconvinced that he is truly dead, goes on to steal his body and decapitate him.

In Halloween: Resurrection (2002), it is revealed that the man Laurie killed was a paramedic with whom Michael (Brad Loree) had swapped clothes. The guilt-ridden Laurie is now an inmate at the Grace Andersen Sanitarium, where the nurses believe her to be catatonic. Instead, she is preparing for Michael to return, and when he does, she lures him on to the institution's rooftop. Although he falls into her trap, Laurie's fears of again killing the wrong person get the better of her; when she tries to remove his mask, Michael stabs her and throws her off the roof, to her death.

==== Rob Zombie film continuity (2007–2009) ====
A new version of Laurie Strode (Scout Taylor-Compton) appears in the Rob Zombie remake (2007). This film establishes from the beginning that Laurie (born Angel Myers) is Michael's baby sister, nicknamed "Boo", with whom young Michael (Daeg Faerch) shares a close bond. When Michael is institutionalized for killing their older sister Judith (Hanna R. Hall), their mother Deborah (Sheri Moon Zombie) is unable to cope and commits suicide. The infant Laurie is discovered by Sheriff Brackett (Brad Dourif), who omits her from the records for her own protection, and she is eventually adopted by the Strode family. The adult Michael (Tyler Mane) escapes and comes home in search of his sister, killing her adoptive parents and her friend Lynda (Kristina Klebe) before kidnapping Laurie. Michael tries to make Laurie remember him by showing her a picture of them as children. This fails, and Laurie proceeds to stab Michael with his own knife. Laurie hides as Michael hunts her down in their old childhood home; when he finds her, she shoots him in the head with a gun she took from Michael's psychiatrist Dr. Sam Loomis (Malcolm McDowell), after which she begins screaming hysterically as the scene fades to an old home video of young Michael and baby Laurie.

In the sequel (2009), Laurie has moved in with Sheriff Brackett and his daughter Annie (Danielle Harris). She suffers recurring nightmares about Michael and their mother, and is seeing a therapist to deal with the trauma. Loomis, who has become a greedy and arrogant mercenary profiting from the murders of the previous film, reveals in his book “The Devil Walks Among Us” that she is Michael's sister and that she also has his "illness". Laurie reads the book and discovers the truth, leading her to an hysterical outburst and storming out of the Brackett house. In the film's climax, she tells a mortally wounded Michael that she loves him, before stabbing him to death and putting on his mask. In the film's final scene, she sits in isolation in a psychiatric ward, grinning at a vision of her mother. In the director's cut of the film, Laurie picks up Michael's knife after Michael is killed and walks over to an injured and unconscious Loomis, and the police open fire on Laurie, apparently killing her too.

==== Universal/Blumhouse continuity (1978; 2018–2022) ====
Jamie Lee Curtis reprised the role in Halloween (2018), which in this continuity ignores the previous sequels in the franchise and serves as a direct sequel to the 1978 film. Consequently, Michael and Laurie are not related in this continuity since that revelation does not exist without the 1981 sequel. The film establishes that Michael (James Jude Courtney) was arrested following his killing spree in 1978, and institutionalized for 40 years in Smith's Grove Sanitarium. Laurie has post-traumatic stress disorder, has been divorced twice, and become an alcoholic. Michael escapes again and returns to Haddonfield for another killing spree. He is taken to Laurie's home by his deranged psychologist and engages in a showdown with Laurie, who traps him in the basement with the help of her daughter, Karen (Judy Greer), and granddaughter, Allyson (Andi Matichak). They set the house ablaze and escape in the back of a passing pickup truck.

Halloween Kills picks up where the previous film left off. It shows people at a bar, but mainly focuses on three people, Lindsey (whose babysitter Annie was killed by Michael Myers in the original film), Tommy Doyle (Laurie babysat and protected him & Lindsey also in the original film) and Marion Chambers (survived an attack from Michael in the original film). Tommy tells a story in honor of Laurie, then the scene changes to where firefighters responding to the burning house inadvertently free Michael. Laurie is hospitalized, where she meets an old friend named Frank Hawkins, who is strongly implied to be Karen's father. Meanwhile, Karen and Allyson join a mob of Haddonfield residents to hunt down Michael and kill him for good. The mob surrounds and attacks Michael, but he arises from seeming defeat and slaughters them all while Karen and Allyson receive medical treatment at the Myers house. Michael returns to his childhood home and murders Karen as well.

Four years later, in Halloween Ends, Michael has been in hiding since his last rampage. Laurie, blamed for provoking his attacks, refuses to let fear rule her life anymore. She has become a more traditional grandmother, bought a home, and even celebrates Halloween. Allyson's new boyfriend, Corey, becomes a kind of apprentice to Michael after they meet in the sewers and helps him in his kills, eventually taking on the Shape persona. He also goes after Laurie for interfering in his romance and attempts suicide to make Allyson think Laurie killed him. Michael appears, kills Corey, and attacks Laurie, who pins him to a table and cuts his throat. Michael attempts to strangle her before a forgiving Allyson returns and breaks his arm. Laurie slits Michael's wrist and he bleeds to death. All of Haddonfield watches as Laurie destroys Michael's body in an industrial shredder. She subsequently completes a memoir and renews her relationship with Hawkins.

Appearances
| Halloween | Halloween II | The Return | The Revenge | The Curse | 20 Years Later | Resurrection | Halloween (2007) | Halloween II (2009) | Halloween (2018) | Kills | Ends |
|---|---|---|---|---|---|---|---|---|---|---|---|
| Survivor | | Confirmed dead | | | Survivor | 3rd victim | Survivor | | | | |

=== Literature ===
Laurie Strode's first literary appearance was in October 1979, in Curtis Richards' novelization of Halloween, which largely follows the events of the film. She also appeared in the 1981 adaptation of Halloween II written by Jack Martin; it was published alongside the first film sequel, with the novel following the film events, with an additional victim, a reporter, added to the novel.

Laurie appears in the twist ending of the comic book Halloween III: The Devil's Eyes. While examining Loomis' diaries in the hopes of finding out more about Michael Myers, an adult Tommy Doyle and Lindsey Wallace are attacked by a person dressed as Michael. They unmask the figure to reveal Laurie Strode, who has taken on her brother's mantle. At the conclusion of the book, Laurie kills Tommy (losing an eye in the process) and is subsequently incarcerated in Smith's Grove, where Dr. Terence Wynn takes an interest in her. This story follows on from Halloween H20, but is set in a non-canon timeline contradicted by the release of Halloween: Resurrection.

The anthology one-shot comic Halloween: 30 Years of Terror includes a Laurie Strode storyline entitled "Visiting Hours". Set between H20 and Resurrection, it shows Laurie in the Grace Anderson Sanitarium, where she wonders how her life could have been if Michael hadn't found her in 1978. In this alternate universe, she lives a happy life in which her friends are still alive, but the memory of Michael invades her fantasy world and leaves her with nothing. Laurie concludes that "I can't even dream of a normal life without [Michael] killing it", and can do nothing but wait for her brother's inevitable "visit" to set her free. Laurie appears prominently in the comic book limited series Halloween: The First Death of Laurie Strode; set after Halloween II, it depicts the events which led to her faking her death. In the novelization of Halloween Kills, the Shape views her as "She Who Will Not Die".

=== Video games ===
Strode made her video game debut with the 1983 Atari video game Halloween. The game is rare to find, often being played on emulators. No characters from the films are specifically named, with the goal of the game focusing on the player, who is a babysitter, protecting children from a "homicidal maniac [who] has escaped from a mental institution". Laurie Strode was added as a playable character, alongside Michael Myers, in downloadable content for Dead by Daylight released in October 2016. Her biography states:

You never know what really matters in life until you've realized it might end soon. Laurie is one of those who just wants a quiet life in the suburbs, hanging out with friends, family and maybe go on a date or two. Laurie is a typical teenager. You could pass her on the street and not think twice. She does her homework and is liked by her friends, teachers and family. A simple night of babysitting turns into something that will forever change the course of her young life. A knife swooshing through the air. Screams from afar. Noises that play tricks with her mind. But not Laurie, she's made of something stronger. Something that won't give up.

=== Merchandise ===
In 2019, NECA released an action figure based on her appearance in Halloween (2018). In 2020, NECA released a figure of Strode alongside Samuel Loomis based on their appearance in Halloween II (1981). The same year, Super7 released a reaction figure of her Halloween II appearance.

== Casting ==
Curtis's manager submitted a photograph of her to the filmmakers who initially didn't want to cast her as they didn't believe her to embody the looks of Laurie, Annie, or Lynda (the virgin, the smart aleck, and the cheerleader). Her manager was persistent on the filmmakers meeting her. After a few meetings, she got cast in the role of the chaste Laurie. Curtis describes Laurie as a fulfilling character due to them being opposites—allowing her to act. In an interview, Carpenter admits that Curtis wasn't the first choice as he didn't know who she was at the time. He originally wanted to cast Anne Lockhart, the daughter of June Lockhart from Lassie, as Laurie. Lockhart, however, had commitments to several other film and television projects. Debra Hill stated upon learning that Curtis was the daughter of Psycho star Janet Leigh, "I knew casting Jamie Lee would be great publicity for the film because her mother was in Psycho."

== Reception ==
Laurie has been compared to the character of Sally Hardesty from The Texas Chain Saw Massacre by a variety of scholars. James Rose notes the parallels between Laurie and Sally, stating:

...for as much as both survive, each, in the end, requires male intervention to fully save them from the narrative's male antagonist: Sally is rescued by a passing driver, while Laurie is saved by Dr. Loomis (Donald Pleasence). Despite this, both Sally and Laurie combine to make manifest the key attributes of the final girl as both struggled, endured and, in Laurie's case, attacked their aggressor until they could escape and be saved. In the slasher films that followed in the wake of Chain Saw and Halloween, the Final Girl steadily gains in strength until she herself vanquishes the male antagonist.

Italian magazine editor Stefano Lo Verme, wrote that the 23-year-old Jamie Lee Curtis was the undisputed "scream queen" of American horror in 1978. He compared Curtis' performance as Laurie to the performances of Sandra Peabody as Mari Collingwood in The Last House on the Left (1972) and Marilyn Burns as Sally Hardesty in The Texas Chain Saw Massacre (1974).
