= The Horse Killer =

1966 mystery film by Luke Moberly

- Behind the scenes. From left, Luke Moberly, Thomas Casey, and leads Shane Erickson and Stephanie Herold.
- Directed by: Luke Moberly
- Written by: Thomas Casey
- Produced by: Luke Moberly; Louis Wiethe
- Starring: Shane Erickson; Stephanie Herold; Kathleen Stanley; Julio Cesare; Bud Irwin; Sandra Peabody; Bob Burns
- Cinematography: Thomas Casey
- Edited by: Luke Moberly
- Production company: Empire Studios
- Country: United States
- Language: English
- Budget: $50,000

The Horse Killer (also known as The Horse Killers) is a lost 1966 American mystery thriller film directed by Luke Moberly, in his directorial debut, and written by Thomas Casey. It stars Shane Erickson, Stephanie Herold, Kathleen Stanley, Julio Cesare, Bud Irwin, Sandra Peabody, and Bob Burns. The story is based on a series of real-life bizarre horse mutilations occurring in Davie, Florida in 1964. Moberly co-produced the film with Louis Wiethe on a budget of US$50,000. Filming took place from August to September 1966. The film was one of Moberly's earliest efforts to contribute to the emerging Miami and Southern Florida film industry. All of the known photographic film existing of it was stolen from him, causing the film to be unreleased.

== Premise ==
The film is based on a real-life incident of horrendous horse mutilations that occurred in Davie, Florida in the early 1960s. It takes a fictionalized approach to the residents attempting to solve the mystery of who is committing the crime.

== Cast ==
The film features a cast of 40 people, but only the following are sourced:

- Shane Erickson, lead male.
- Stephanie Herold, lead female.
- Kathleen Stanley
- Julio Cesare
- Bud Irwin
- Sandra Peabody (as Sandy Peabody), the most prolific of the known cast in her second feature film. She would later star in the Wes Craven written and directed horror film The Last House on the Left (1972). Peabody recollects portraying a "girlfriend" character.
- Bob Burns
- Gordon Sanford Diem, was a Palm Beach radio host.
- Blanche Wallace, was a local nightclub entertainer.
- Clint Cullen as himself, he was a local farrier and character actor. He had bit parts in western films prior to being cast.
- Phil Philbin, was the town of Davie's detective lieutenant.

== Production history ==
I started getting roles in low-budget drive-in movies that were being shot in Florida. The first one was called The Horse Killer. It was actually based on the true story of a man who castrated horses! It was a really bizarre story, but it wasn't like Last House, with sex or murder. It was more of a mystery, where these incidents were happening and they were trying to find this weird guy who was doing it. I was playing the girlfriend and we had a lot of scenes riding horses and that sort of thing.

— Peabody recollecting Horse Killer

Luke Moberly launched the production company Empire Studios in the mid-1960s. The studio struggled to attract mainstream attention. Moberly had several producers approach him for interest in filming in the Davie, Florida area, only to back out before signing a deal.

Wanting to make a high-quality feature film rather than a pornographic film that were commercially successful at the time, Moberly partnered with former Cincinnati theatre owner turned Broward County resident Louis Wiethe with plans of directing a feature film based on a screenplay of 154 pages by Thomas Casey. Through this partnership, Weithe allowed Moberly full creative control over the script, production, and casting.

Shooting began in August 1966, with exteriors filmed in the Davie and Fort Lauderdale area. Filming later moved to Empire Studios. The sets for the film were all built by Moberly. Scoring and editing took place in January 1967, and a completed version of the film was shipped to New York sometime between January and April for screening to potential distributors.

Moberly cast 40 local Florida actors and no "big name" Hollywood stars, except the then-known Shane Erickson in the lead role. Sixteen-year-old Stephanie Herold got cast in the lead female role. Moberly described her as a "real actress." Herold was discovered by him in Miami. The most notable of the cast would be the then-teenaged Sandra Peabody, who had just made her feature film debut in Misfit (1965; another film produced by Moberly's Empire Studios). She got cast in an additional supporting role. Peabody retrospectively recalled portraying a "girlfriend" character and filming a lot of scenes of riding horses. Clint Cullen, a local farrier and character actor, was cast as himself. He had bit parts in western films prior to being cast.

== Lost status ==
A seemingly nice man, Rene Martinez, visited Moberly in his office. Martinez expressed interest in screening and distributing the film in the Latin market. Moberly agreed to let him take a print. Martinez returned to say it was a success and didn't need a Spanish translation, and that he could get copies of it made at a much cheaper cost in Mexico. Moberly agreed and never saw the negative of the film again. This loss of film led to financial struggles with Moberly's production studio and future endeavors.
