= Warren Day =

American actor

- Born: Warren Day; March 1, 1946 (age 79)
- Occupation: Actor

Warren Day (born March 1, 1944) is a former American actor best known for his role as Curtis in Andrew Marton's comedy film Birds Do It (1966). He additionally guest starred on the NBC television series Flipper (1965).

== Life and career ==
Warren graduated South Broward High School in 1962. He spent 2 years after graduation studying acting at the Pasadena Playhouse in California. He did summer stock in Illinois and a touring theatre in parts of Pennsylvania and Miami. He had a guest role on the NBC television series Flipper (1965) which was filmed at Ivan Tors Studios in Miami. He portrayed a young Mexican fisherman. At 19-years-old, Warren made his feature film debut in Bob O'Donnell's faith-based educational film Misfit (1965) as a "religious dropout." Warren abandoned his plans of working in California for the emerging Miami and Southern Florida film industry, in which he deemed as a "lucrative field" for film. In 1965, he had a supporting role in the Robert Berswell directed play The Visit. He joined the Truly O'Possum's Theatre, a traveling theatre that would show 45-minutes of cartoons for children. In 1966, he portrayed Curtis in Andrew Marton's comedy film Birds Do It.

== Film ==
Year	Title	Role	Notes
1965	Misfit	Lead	
1966	Birds Do It	Curtis	
1967	Shanty Tramp	Supporting	

== Television ==
Year	Title	Role	Episode(s)
1965	Flipper	Paco	Episode: "The Ditching: Part 2"
