= Deranged =

Deranged may refer to psychosis, a generic psychiatric term for a mental state often described as involving a "loss of contact with reality".

Deranged may also refer to:

In films:

- Deranged (1974 film), an American horror film
- Deranged (1987 film), a horror film
- Deranged (2012 film), a South Korean science fiction, horror and thriller film
- Idaho Transfer, a 1973 American film also known under its UK video title of Deranged

In music:

- Deranged (band), a Swedish death metal band formed in 1991
- Deranged Records, a Canadian punk record label

Other uses:

- Deranged, a type of drainage system (geomorphology)
- Ibrahim of the Ottoman Empire (1615–1648), Ottoman Sultan called Ibrahim the Deranged
- Derangement, in combinatorial mathematics, a permutation of the elements of a set in which none of the elements appear in their original position
