= Popcorn (American TV series) =

- Genre: Variety show
- Created by: Sandra Peabody
- Starring: Julia Markley; Mark Durrow; Kristina Yoshida; Aaron Cooley
- Country of origin: United States
- Original language: English

Production
- Executive producer: Sandra Peabody
- Camera setup: Videotape; Multi-camera

Original release
- Network: KATU

Popcorn is an American children's variety show created by Sandra Peabody, who also served as executive producer and a writer and director for the series. The series stars Julia Markley, Mark Durrow, Kristina Yoshida, and Aaron Cooley as "Popcorn reporters" who conduct interviews and explore topics relevant to children. The series features several celebrity guest stars such as Eric Heiden and Tomie dePaola.

Peabody, who began her career as a child actor, retired from acting and was transitioning to a career as a freelance producer. She wanted to create Popcorn in response to the decline in children's television productions. KATU picked up the series initially as a television special before expanding it to a full fledged series. Popcorn earned several accolades during its run, such as a Primetime Emmy Award, Iris Award and a NAB award.

== Production ==
=== Conception ===
By the mid 1980s, Peabody had retired from acting after having a successful career as an actress since childhood. After teaching theatrical training to children at the American Academy of Dramatic Arts in New York, Peabody moved from New York City to Portland, Oregon and began working as a freelance producer for television programming. During the development of Popcorn, local children's television was declining as an industry. Peabody wanted to create more children-orientated series to fill in the lack of local content. Peabody's goal for the project was to offer something different than the science fiction and animation genres.

Peabody signed a contract with KATU as a part-time employee to broadcast the series. To develop ideas for Popcorn, Peabody spent a lot of time visiting schools. Terry Deming, the executive producer for local programming at the station, described the series as a "public service," opting not to find sponsors. He stated, "Kids aren't necessarily going to sit around and watch some cheaply made puppets doing educational stuff. You've got to be kind of slick and savvy." The show had an annual budget of $25,000 and no promotion. Peabody would buy her props from flea markets and garage sales with a prop budget of $10.

=== Casting ===
The casting process consisted of Peabody visiting gifted and talented programs in schools, attending local children's theater productions, and contacting talent and modeling agencies. She later held in-studio auditions. Peabody cast Julia Markley, Mark Durrow, Kristina Yoshida, and Aaron Cooley as the "Popcorn reporters," besting 50 other children. Markley worked previously with Peabody on the children's series Get Movin' (1982); Durrow was involved both onstage and behind the scenes at the Firehouse Cultural Center; Yoshida was a child model and aspiring writer; and Cooley had acted in commercials.

More than 400 letters from children were received by KATU asking questions such as whether they could help the "Popcorn reporters" or if they could be a reporter on the show. Peabody created the "Spotlight on Kids" segment; this allowed local children to showcase their talent and be involved in the series. Qualifications were broad—singing and dancing to conducting science experiments were among the skill sets allowed. With over 300 children auditioning, the auditions were limited to 2-minutes, although Peabody often trimmed the official clips to showcase the best of the children.

Popcorn featured several guest appearances from celebrities such as Olympic gold medalist Eric Heiden and children's writer and illustrator Tomie dePaola. Singer Tina Turner agreed to appear on the show. Turner had to cancel after becoming ill.

== Cast ==
- Julia Markley as Popcorn reporter
- Mark Durrow as Popcorn reporter
- Kristina Yoshida as Popcorn reporter
- Aaron Cooley as Popcorn reporter

== Awards and nominations ==
Year	Award	Category	Recipient	Result	References
1987	NAB award	Service to Children Award	Sandra Peabody	Won	
1989	Iris Award	Excellence in Local Broadcasting	Sandra Peabody	Won	
1992	Primetime Emmy Award		Sandra Peabody	Won	
