= Texas Chainsaw Massacre (2022 film) =

2022 film by David Blue Garcia

- Promotional release poster
- Directed by: David Blue Garcia
- Screenplay by: Chris Thomas Devlin
- Story by: Fede Álvarez; Rodo Sayagues
- Based on: Characters by: Kim Henkel; Tobe Hooper
- Produced by: Fede Álvarez; Herbert W. Gains; Kim Henkel; Ian Henkel; Pat Cassidy
- Starring: Sarah Yarkin; Elsie Fisher; Mark Burnham; Moe Dunford; Nell Hudson; Jessica Allain; Olwen Fouéré; Jacob Latimore; Alice Krige
- Cinematography: Ricardo Diaz
- Edited by: Christopher S. Capp
- Music by: Colin Stetson
- Production companies: Legendary Pictures; Bad Hombre
- Distributed by: Netflix
- Release date: February 18, 2022
- Running time: 83 minutes
- Country: United States
- Language: English

Texas Chainsaw Massacre is a 2022 American slasher film directed by David Blue Garcia, with a screenplay by Chris Thomas Devlin, from a story by Fede Álvarez and Rodo Sayagues. It is the ninth installment of the Texas Chainsaw Massacre franchise. Set fifty years after the original film, (Note: According to Fede Álvarez, the film does not explicitly erase the continuity of Part 2: "When movies do that, sometimes it feels a bit disrespectful to all the other films. Some people love Texas Chainsaw 2. I love a lot of things about that movie — it's so wacky and of its time. But the rest is such a mess canon-wise. I think it's up to you to decide when and how the events of the other movies happen.") the story focuses on the serial killer Leatherface targeting a group of young adults and coming into conflict with a vengeful survivor of his previous murders. The project is a joint-venture production between Legendary Pictures, Exurbia Films, and Bad Hombre. The film stars Sarah Yarkin, Elsie Fisher, Mark Burnham, Moe Dunford, Nell Hudson, Jessica Allain, Olwen Fouéré, Jacob Latimore, and Alice Krige.

After the release of Leatherface in 2017, Lionsgate had plans for five more films in the franchise. However, the studio lost the rights due to the time it took to release it. Legendary acquired the franchise's rights, with Álvarez and Sayagues serving as producers alongside Pat Cassidy, Ian Henkel, and Kim Henkel, who co-wrote the original film. Duo filmmakers Ryan and Andy Tohill were initially signed on as directors, but were replaced with Garcia due to creative differences. Filming took place in Bulgaria in August 2020.

Texas Chainsaw Massacre was released on February 18, 2022, on Netflix and received generally negative reviews from critics.

== Plot ==
Following Leatherface's killing spree in 1973, the sole survivor, Sally Hardesty, never spoke about the story again after giving her statement to the police. 50 years later, young entrepreneurs Melody and Dante, Melody's sister Lila and Dante's girlfriend Ruth travel to the abandoned Texas town of Harlow, to auction off old properties to create a trendy, heavily gentrified area. While inspecting a dilapidated orphanage, the group discovers it is still occupied by an elderly woman called Ginny. When she claims she has papers to prove she still owns the property, an argument breaks out, briefly interrupted by a silent and towering man from upstairs.

Ginny then collapses from a heart attack and is rushed to the hospital, accompanied by Ruth and the man. An investor, Catherine, along with a group of potential buyers, arrives in Harlow on a large bus, distracting Melody and Dante. Meanwhile, Lila strikes up a friendship with a local mechanic, Richter, and reveals she was a survivor of a school shooting, leaving her terrified of guns. Ginny dies en route to the hospital; Ruth texts Melody before the man goes berserk and murders the officers driving the ambulance, leading it to crash.

When Ruth awakens, she witnesses the man, revealed to be Leatherface, cutting off Ginny's face to wear as a mask. Ruth manages to radio for help before being killed by Leatherface, who returns to Harlow. During a property auction, Melody reads Ruth's texts and prepares to leave with Lila. Richter overhears them talking about Ginny's death and takes their keys, agreeing to give them back once they provide proof that Ginny was rightfully evicted. Melody and Dante return to the orphanage to find them.

Sally Hardesty, the sole survivor of Leatherface's previous killing spree and now a battle-hardened Texas Ranger, receives a call to say that Leatherface is back and heads out to investigate. At the orphanage, Melody discovers the papers and realizes that Ginny was wrongfully evicted. Leatherface arrives at the orphanage and attacks Dante, mutilating him. Melody hides as Leatherface retrieves his chainsaw from his bedroom. A thunderstorm hits Harlow as night falls, forcing Catherine and Lila to take cover in the bus with the buyers. Dante manages to stumble out of the orphanage, where Richter discovers him before he bleeds to death. Richter enters the orphanage and is attacked and killed by Leatherface. Melody retrieves the car and bus keys from his body before fleeing the house, reuniting with Lila. They get on the bus, pursued by Leatherface, who slaughters all of the people aboard, including Catherine.

Melody and Lila escape the carnage and come across Sally, who locks them in her car before entering the orphanage to confront Leatherface finally. She holds him at gunpoint, demanding he remember the pain he inflicted on her and her friends, but is met by only silence before Leatherface walks away. Leatherface then attacks the sisters in Sally's car, but they are saved by Sally, who shoots him. Sally gives Melody the keys to drive away before pursuing Leatherface. Leatherface ambushes and fatally injures Sally. Melody hits Leatherface with Sally's car before crashing into a nearby building; Melody is trapped but orders Lila to run away. When Leatherface appears, Melody tearfully apologizes for what they did to Ginny. As he moves in to attack, Lila attempts to shoot him, but her gun is empty. Sally shoots him instead, and he flees. Before dying of her injuries, Sally encourages Lila not to run, as Leatherface will forever haunt Lila the same way he haunted her.

Lila then takes Sally's shotgun and pursues Leatherface into an abandoned building, where she is ambushed and attacked. Melody arrives and takes Leatherface's chainsaw before using it to uppercut him, knocking him into a pool of water where he sinks to the bottom. They escape, and Lila finds Sally's hat and puts it on before starting the morning drive back home.

Leatherface emerges, still alive, and drags Melody out of the car before decapitating her with his chainsaw in the middle of the street. A horrified Lila watches as the self-driving car takes her out of Harlow—Leatherface dances in the street with his chainsaw and Melody's head.

In a post-credit scene, Leatherface walks down the road towards his childhood home.

== Cast ==
- Elsie Fisher as Lila, Melody's younger sister and an amateur photographer
- Sarah Yarkin as Melody, a San Francisco moneymaker who drags her sister with her to Texas on a business trip out of fear of leaving her alone in the city
- Moe Dunford as Richter, a contractor who befriends Lila
- Nell Hudson as Ruth, Dante's girlfriend
- Olwen Fouéré as Sally Hardesty, a Texas ranger and the only survivor of Leatherface's killing spree in 1973. Fouéré replaces original actress Marilyn Burns, who died in 2014
- Jacob Latimore as Dante Spivey, a close friend of Melody and Lila
- Jessica Allain as Catherine, an investor
- Alice Krige as Virginia "Ginny" McCumber, the owner of Leatherface's current home
- William Hope as Sheriff Hathaway
- Jolyon Coy as Deputy
- Sam Douglas as Herb
- Mark Burnham as Leatherface, a masked chainsaw-wielding murderer and a mainstay of the TCM franchise. Burnham was cast because of his imposing stature and physicality

Additionally, John Larroquette reprises his role as the film's narrator, having provided voice over for the original film, the 2003 remake and its prequel.

== Production ==
=== Development ===
Initially during the development of Leatherface (2017), the producers had the film rights and intention to make five more Texas Chainsaw Massacre films. In April 2015, producer Christa Campbell stated that the fate of the potential sequels would largely depend on the financial and critical reception to Leatherface. By December 2017, Lionsgate and Millennium Films had lost the film rights, due to the amount of time it took to release Leatherface.

In August 2018, it was reported that Legendary Pictures had entered preliminary negotiations to purchase the film rights to Texas Chainsaw Massacre, with the studio intending to adapt television and film installments. The following year, Fede Álvarez signed onto the project as producer. In November 2019, Chris Thomas Devlin joined the production as screenwriter. In February 2020, Ryan Tohill and Andy Tohill were hired to serve as directors for the film, with Angus Mitchell signed on as cinematographer after collaborating on The Dig (2018). In May of the same year, it was announced that the film would serve as a sequel to the original film and feature a 60-year-old Leatherface, notably similar to the approach that Blumhouse Productions took with their Halloween films. In February 2022, Álvarez clarified that the events of the original sequels took place in the film's continuity.

=== Casting ===
In October 2020, it was announced that Elsie Fisher had been cast to star in the film alongside Sarah Yarkin, Moe Dunford, Alice Krige, Jacob Latimore, Nell Hudson, Jessica Allain, Sam Douglas, William Hope and Jolyon Coy. In March 2021, it was revealed that Mark Burnham had been cast as Leatherface, replacing Gunnar Hansen, while Olwen Fouéré was cast as Sally Hardesty, replacing Marilyn Burns.

=== Filming ===
Production was initially slated to begin on May 4, 2020. Principal photography commenced on August 17, 2020, in Bulgaria. However, after being unimpressed with what was filmed, the studio fired Ryan and Andy Tohill. David Blue Garcia was hired to replace them as director. The footage shot by the Tohill brothers would not be used, with Garcia starting over on the production. Director of photography Angus Mitchell left the project along with the directors and was replaced by Ricardo Diaz. Garcia and Diaz were given a very short amount of time for preparation and worked off of "shorthands and bullet points", as well as their understanding of the first film. Garcia said it was a challenge to make Bulgaria look like Texas, but they leaned into the idea that it looked more like West Texas, near the Fort Davis mountains. Garcia praised production designer Michael Perry and set decorators Asen Bozilov and Joey Ostrander for building a good replica of a Texas town, even if there wasn't enough barbed wire to fully emulate Texas.

=== Post-production ===
By March 2021, Álvarez announced that production had completed, while confirming that the film would focus on an older-aged Leatherface. The filmmaker revealed that the production took an "old school" approach to filmmaking, noting vintage lenses and practical effects used for the gore. The following month, the film was officially titled Texas Chainsaw Massacre. It was believed at one point that the title had changed to Texas Chainsaw Begins but Devlin denied this. In May, it was reported that after test screenings, the audience reaction was generally negative. In August, Álvarez stated that overall audience response at test screenings was mostly positive, emphasizing that the film remains respectful to the first film's legacy.

That same month, it was revealed that Colin Stetson served as composer for the film.

== Release ==
In October 2020, the film was initially stated for a theatrical release sometime in 2021. However, in August 2021, the film was revealed to skip a theatrical release and would instead be released exclusively on Netflix. In October 2021, during an "Ask Me Anything" (AMA) on the social media site Reddit, Álvarez stated that the film was most likely planned for an early 2022 release date. On December 3, 2021, a first look of the film was released, along with the announcement of its February 18 release date.

== Reception ==
=== Audience viewership ===
The film debuted at number two on Netflix's global charts during the week of its release—it was viewed by subscribers for 29.2 million hours. It ranked at number three on the global charts the further week. Five days after its release, the film still ranked at number one on Netflix's top ten lists in the United States, Brazil and Saudi Arabia, among other regions.

=== Critical response ===
On the review aggregator website Rotten Tomatoes, 30% of 162 critics' reviews are positive, with an average rating of 4.3/10. The website's consensus reads: "Texas Chainsaw Massacre doesn't skimp on the gore, but Leatherface may have irrevocably lost his ability to terrify." Metacritic, which uses a weighted average, assigned the film a score of 34 out of 100, based on 28 critics, indicating "generally unfavorable" reviews.

Valerie Complex for Deadline Hollywood wrote: "The real horror here is the modernizing of the content by merging social media, social issues and Twitter buzz words in a careless fashion that makes it hard to latch onto anything substantial". For The A.V. Club, A.A. Dowd negatively compared the film to David Gordon Green's Halloween, and said: "Isn't it kind of arrogant to position your movie as the only proper follow-up to an iconic original and then make the same blunders as the films you're retconning?" Owen Gleiberman of Variety called the film "a blood-soaked but unscary footnote." David Sims of The Atlantic said that the film "feels unnecessary and anonymous, leaning on crass visual shocks while failing to match the unsparing brutality of its lodestar." Jocelyn Noveck of the Associated Press gave the film 1/4 stars, writing: "Did we really need another? And sadly, given the lack of imagination, creativity or even basic attention to logic in a perfunctory and downright silly script, the answer seems a resounding "Nope."" Lauren Milici of Total Film remarked that the movie failed to honor the original, writing: "It's a formulaic film about a group of kids who get chased by a killer. Take Leatherface out of the equation and you could easily mistake it for any other horror."

Writing for TheWrap, William Bibbiani said: "Garcia clearly knows that this is the film's ultraviolent slasher centerpiece, and he absolutely delivers on all that gory promise." Frank Scheck of The Hollywood Reporter wrote: "Texas Chainsaw Massacre doesn't exactly offer anything new, but gorehound fans who rejoice at watching people's innards fall out of their bodies will find much to appreciate." Brad Wheeler of The Globe and Mail wrote: "Texas Chainsaw Massacre is what it says it is. You have your Texas, your chainsaw, your massacre." Benjamin Lee of The Guardian gave the film three out of five stars, describing it as "a jolting little slasher that should repulse and satisfy those with a suitably depraved idea of what they are clicking into." Jonathan Dehaan of Nightmare on Film Street said: "Texas Chainsaw Massacre is as violent and as blood-soaked as any of the sequels that came before it, even if it is without a defined purpose."

== Future ==
An upcoming tenth film, Texas Chainsaw Legacy, is in development. A bidding war for future rights was underway, with many studios and creatives in mind. These included a film directed and co-written by Bryan Bertino and produced by Oz Perkins for Neon, a television series developed by JT Mollner and Glen Powell and produced by Roy Lee for A24, a film also produced by Lee for Netflix, and Taylor Sheridan producing for Paramount. Jordan Peele's Monkeypaw Productions had also been involved in the bidding war but left early on. In September 2025, A24 emerged as the front runner, with the Netflix film also happening; the former ultimately acquired film and television rights to the franchise in February 2026, though distribution for the film previously set at Netflix remains in question. On April 21, 2026, it was announced that Curry Barker is set to write and direct the planned untitled tenth film with A24.

== Themes and analysis ==
Following the film's release, many journalists and film critics commented on its themes of gun violence and gentrification, as well as minor commentary on social media and influencers. Lex Briscuso of Paste wrote that the film is "ultimately conservative in its messaging."

Brian Tallerico of RogerEbert.com interpreted the film as a cautionary tale against gentrification, as well as one plays with the concept of social media. Sonny Bunch of The Bulwark wrote that the film's protagonists, Gen Z social media influencers who move to a small Texas town, can be viewed as both "a plague of iPhone-carrying locusts" and sympathetic within the film's context. Cathy Gunning of Screen Rant also believed the film tackled the topic of gentrification, though with less subtlety than the original. Elisa Guimarães of Collider wrote that the film satirizes everyone "from influences to bankers", and attempts to tackle the topics of "school shootings, gun control, gentrification, historical racism, [and] cancel culture", though the author believes it failed at doing so well. Guimarães believed much of the film's intended messaging was too vague, saying that it is unclear as to whether the film is pro-gun rights or pro-gun control, and accused the film of being "racist" for its scene involving several characters arguing over the presence of a Confederate flag. Kimberly Myles of the Los Angeles Times noted that the film dealt with "social commentary on school shootings, gentrification and racism", while being unsubtle about it. Sean O'Neal of Texas Monthly believed the film mocked "opportunistic hipsters" who move from California to Texas, while defending the local Texan rednecks, who are proven right in their suspicions. O'Neal also wrote that the film features an amusing and "ludicrous" scene, in which a group of party-goers record Leatherface on their phones, with one threatening to cancel him, before he proceeds to brutally murder them. The scene was generally perceived as a tongue-in-cheek mockery of cancel culture.

The film's producer, Fede Álvarez, stated in an interview with Collider that the film deals with the topics of gun violence and morality. Álvarez states that the film is intentionally vague and lacks exact clarity in its themes, as it was the filmmaker's intention to explore moral and political division:

"There's this theme, there's two sides of it. These people are wrong, these people are right,' because that's not how the world works for us. The world is a f*cking mess and [there's] shades of gray and there can be all sorts of characters in both sides of the story, so that's the way we approached it. We wanted you to walk out of it and go, 'Wait, but I still don't have an answer! Who was right and wrong?' Because that is the way that life works. I know that some movies do give you an answer and they take a strong point of view. For us, in something like Texas Chainsaw Massacre, it's the most gruesome horror movie, you've gotta be chaotic and it cannot be preachy. It's not school time."

The film's director, David Blue Garcia, said in an interview with Polygon that while the film had social commentary, he did not wish for the film to make "a statement" on political issues, and described the film's gun politics as "very nuanced."

== Marketing ==
On June 6, 2024, a digital pinball table was released by Zen Studios for Pinball M, inspired by the 2022 Texas Chainsaw Massacre movie.

An attraction based on the film opened at Six Flags Fright Fest through early September to November 3, 2024.

Three action figures of Leatherface from the film were released by Hiya Toys in 2024.
