= Misfit (1965 film) =

American educational film

- Behind the scenes.
- Directed by: Bob O'Donnell
- Produced by: Al Kuhnle
- Starring: Steven Jones; Warren Day; Sandra Peabody
- Cinematography: Mario Delio
- Production company: Empire Studios
- Distributed by: Youth Films
- Release date: 1965
- Running time: 60 minutes
- Country: United States
- Language: English

Misfit (also known as The Misfit) is a lost 1965 American faith-based educational film directed by Bob O'Donnell. It stars Steven Jones, Warren Day, and Sandra Peabody. It follows a high school drop out (Jones), a drug addict (Peabody), and a "religious dropout" (Day) who rekindles his religion and helps the titular "misfit" find himself. Produced by Empire Studios, the film was distributed through churches, schools, penal institutions, and military bases before a worldwide release by Youth Films.

== Premise ==
A million of students drop out of high school each year. We believe part of the answer is in finding a purpose, a direction for the teenagers." — Bill Zeoli (president of Youth Films) on the film's premise

== Cast ==
The film features a cast of 24 people, only the following are sourced:

- Steven Jones
- Warren Day, a then up-and-coming 19-year-old Hollywood, Florida actor. He had a guest appearance on the television series Flipper (1965).
- Sandra Peabody (as Sandy Peabody) as a teen drug addict, in her feature film debut. She would later star in another Empire Studios film, The Horse Killer (1966).
- Wendy Roberts
- Susan Abbott
- Jay Laskay

== Production ==
The film was produced by Luke Moberly's Fort Lauderdale, Florida-based production company, Empire Studios. Bob O'Donnell was hired as the director and Mario Delio as the cinematographer. The cast consisted mostly of local Broward County, Palm Beach, and Miami-Dade-based teen actors. 20-year-old Steven Jones was cast in the titular "misfit" role, while Warren Day was cast as the religious teen who helps Jones's character find himself. Day was an up-and-coming 19-year-old Hollywood, Florida actor and South Broward High School graduate known at the time for his guest role on the television series Flipper (1965).

80 local teen actresses auditioned for the lead female role of a teen drug addict. Sandra Peabody ultimately got the part, although she wasn't the original choice. Peabody was cast after the lead actress fell sick to a sudden ailment before filming. This marked her acting debut. Wendy Roberts, Susan Abbott, and Jay Laskay were cast in additional supporting roles.

Filming took place in May 1965, with scenes shot in West Palm Beach, Fort Lauderdale, and parts of Miami.

== Release history ==
Produced by Empire Studios, the film was distributed through churches, schools, penal institutions, and military bases before a worldwide release by Youth Films. Since its 1965 release, the film has yet to be released on home media or streaming services.
