= Legacy of Satan =

- Theatrical release poster
- Directed by: Gerard Damiano
- Written by: Gerard Damiano
- Starring: John Francis; Lisa Christian; Paul Barry; Deborah Horlen; Sandra Peabody
- Edited by: Gerard Damiano
- Release date: April 1, 1974
- Running time: 68 minutes
- Country: United States
- Language: English

Legacy of Satan is a 1974 horror film written and directed by Gerard Damiano. It stars John Francis, Lisa Christian, Paul Barry, Deborah Horlen and Sandra Peabody, who respectively portray Dr. Muldavo, Maya, George, the High Priestess, and a cult member. Set in New York, the film revolves around Maya (Christian), a young woman who is chosen to be the queen of a satanic cult, and her descent into madness when her normal life is hindered by a series of evocative dreams. Originally written as a hardcore film, Damiano ultimately decided to rewrite it as a psychological horror film.

Damiano shot the film on a shoestring budget and featured a cast of relatively unknown actors. The film is notable for being the debut film of Christa Helm, an aspiring actress who was murdered three years after the release of this film. Filmed in 1972, the film subsequently had a limited theatrical release in 1973 and became a part of the grindhouse circuit as a double feature to both Tobe Hooper's landmark horror film The Texas Chain Saw Massacre (1974) and Andy Milligan's Blood (1973) from 1974 to 1976. It has been met to generally negative reviews with the score of the film being heavily criticized by critics.

== Plot ==
A high priestess of a satanic cult talks about a woman who is chosen to be the queen to the coven leader Dr. Muldavo. A person can join the cult only once every 1000 years, and member who knows the woman agrees to bring her into their lair. At a dinner party, a young woman named Maya brings drinks to her husband George and his friend Arthur. Later that night, Carlos breaks into their apartment and steals a photo of Maya whilst they are sleeping. At the coven, he returns to Dr. Muldavo and gives him the photograph – Maya is the woman who is destined to become his queen. Muldavo goes to Arthur, who is being fed blood by a woman and tells him to invite George and Maya to a costume party.

Later, the cult holds a rite of passage. The high priestess begins burning Maya's photograph between a woman's legs. This causes Maya, back in her apartment, to have an evocative dream. When George wakes her up from her sleep, Maya has a violent outburst. Following the ritual, Maya begins having disturbing hallucinations such as seeing a bleeding picture followed by an attack, and bite to her neck by a mysterious creature. At Arthur's invitation, they attend the cult's party with costumes and limo ride being provided for them. Carlos brings George drugged wine and gets Maya delirious. Upon meeting Dr. Muldavo, Maya finds herself intrigued and attracted to him. George is locked up in a cellar. Subsequently, Auriela, a cult member who is jealous of the affection for Maya, gives George a glowing sword that causes the cult members to hide as the light from the sword inflicts pain on them.

== Cast ==
- John Francis as Dr. Muldavo
- Lisa Christian as Maya
- Paul Barry as George
- Jarrar Ramze as Carlos
- Christa Helm as The Girl
- Sandra Peabody as a Cult Extra
- Ann Paul as Aurelia
- James Procter as Arthur
- Deborah Horlen as The High Priestess

== Production ==
Written under the working title Muldavo, the film was originally intended to be filmed as a hardcore film, however, Damiano ultimately decided to rewrite the film as psychological horror film. It was filmed in 1972 but did not have a theatrical release until 1974. Legacy of Satan was released alongside Tobe Hooper's landmark horror film The Texas Chain Saw Massacre as a double feature in the grindhouse circuit from 1974 to 1976. Damiano produced the film on a low budget and used a cast of relatively unknown actors, with a cameo appearance from Sandra Peabody, who was becoming a prominent actress in the horror genre following her appearance in Wes Craven's debut film The Last House on the Left in 1972, garnering comparisons to Marilyn Burns, the star of The Texas Chain Saw Massacre.

== Reception ==
In Claws & Saucers: Science Fiction, Horror, and Fantasy Film 1902-1982: A Complete Guide, David Elroy Goldweber gave the film a negative review, stating, "Talk about uninspired. Everyone acts like they think they are supposed to act in this kind of picture. They chant to their devil master, they wear odd, revealing outfits, they drink blood from silver cups. The long opening credits sequence is the highlight, featuring the best of several Black Masses. Annoying buzzing and chirping keyboards play almost continuously. Short as it is, the picture feels endless."
