= Mari Collingwood =

- The Last House on the Left character
- Sandra Peabody portraying Mari
- First appearance: The Last House on the Left (1972)
- Created by: Wes Craven
- Portrayed by: Sandra Peabody (1972 film); Sara Paxton (2009 film)

In-universe information
- Occupation: Competitive swimmer (2009 film)

Mari Collingwood is a fictional character in The Last House on the Left films. She first appears in The Last House on the Left (1972) as a hippie girl abducted on her seventeenth birthday by a fugitive family. Conceptualized by Wes Craven, she was portrayed by a twenty-three-year-old Sandra Peabody in one of her early film appearances. Director Dennis Iliadis brings the character back in the 2009 reimagining, this time portrayed by Sara Paxton.

Craven conceptualized Mari with the basis of her being the 1970s version of the virginal Karin (Birgitta Pettersson) from Ingmar Bergman's medieval Sweden set The Virgin Spring (1960)—symbolizing innocence during an era of apprehension caused by the Vietnam War. Iliadis' vision of Mari was to make her proactive and set forth to humanize her through her depiction as a competitive swimmer and the subplot of her late brother. Due to this characterization, critics have called Iliadis' version of the character as following aspects of the "final girl" archetype, contrasting with her original depiction.

== Appearances ==
The character made her cinematic debut in The Last House on the Left (1972) on August 30, 1972. In this film, Mari is an upper-class sheltered teenaged girl going to a rock concert in a city with her friend Phyllis to celebrate her seventeenth birthday. While looking for marijuana dealers, escaped convicts lure them into their hideout and abduct them. In the woods near Mari's home, she is humiliated and raped before being shot to death in a nearby lake and later found by her parents. She later appears in the nightmares of one of the film's villains.

In the 2009 film, Mari is a competitive swimmer who goes on vacation with her parents John and Emma to their lake house. Mari takes the family car and drives into town to hang out with her friend Paige. While Paige is finishing her shift as a cashier, they meet a teenager named Justin, who invites them both back to his motel room to smoke marijuana. While there, Justin's family members return: Krug, Justin's father; Francis, Justin's uncle; and Sadie, Krug's girlfriend. Due to the widespread media coverage of Krug's recent escape from police custody, the criminals decide to kidnap them and steal Mari's car to leave town. Mari convinces Krug to take a road that is in the direction of her parents' lake house; in an attempt to escape, Mari burns Sadie's face with a cigarette lighter and attempts to jump out of the vehicle, but is unable to when the car crashes. After being raped by Krug, Mari manages to escape the criminals and make it to the lake so she can swim to safety. However, Krug shoots her in the back and she is left for dead, but she is later revealed to have survived. Mari manages to reach her parents' porch and with them seeks revenge; Mari, John, Emma, and Justin then take a boat to the hospital.

== Development ==
Returning to New York after a cross-country road trip, Peabody was originally asked by the film makers to audition for the role of Phyllis after responding to a casting notice in the trade publication Backstage. After meeting the producer Sean S. Cunningham she was cast as Mari. Craven stated, "I liked Sandra Peabody a lot; I thought she was very pretty, and very plucky... because she was a very young actress, she wasn't nearly as confident and easy going as Lucy [Grantham] was, and she had become involved in something very, very rough. And she hung in there. When the character was raped, she was treated very roughly, and I know Sandra said to me afterwards, 'My God... I had the feeling they really hated me.'" Jacob Knight interpreted that Wes Craven created Mari with the intention of her being a metaphor of peace and innocence during an era of apprehension, "He wants us to see her as a sexual object, the peace sign necklace her parents gift to her before she heads into the city no match for the angry, depraved, aggressors who tear her and Phyllis’ clothes off. In this way, Craven has molded Mari to be something of an avatar for how he views the “Love Generation”; inexperienced balls of flesh who think their hippie posturing will save them from society's wolves."

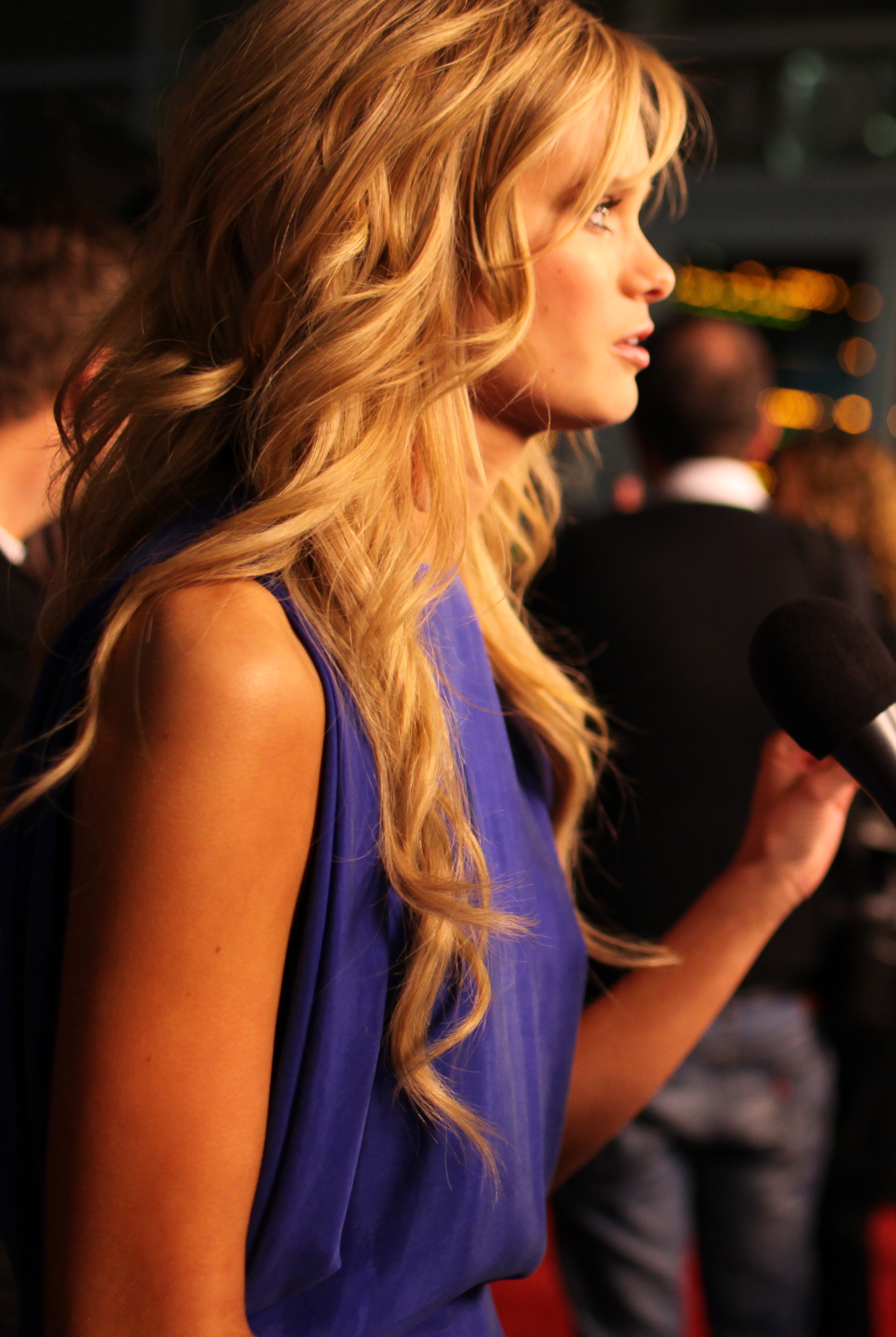
Sara Paxton attending the premiere of The Last House on the Left (2009)

Various cast and crew of the original film have stated that Sandra Peabody was genuinely unnerved during the entire making of the film and at one point walked off set. In an interview for David A. Szulkin's non-fiction book Wes Craven's Last House on the Left: The Making of a Cult Classic, Peabody confirmed that she had been upset while making the movie, and that fellow actor David Hess had scared her. In 2008, Hess admitted to Vanity Fair writer Jason Zinoman that he had sexually threatened Peabody on set, saying, "I told her, 'I'm really going to fuck you if you don't behave yourself. They'll just let the camera run. I'm going to devastate you.' I don't think she was too happy about that."

Sara Paxton revealed that she only auditioned for the 2009 remake of the film as an acting exercise and was not expecting to obtain the role. In an interview, Paxton stated, "In the audition, Dennis was like, 'So how’s your swimming ability?' And I was like, 'I played a mermaid. I’m an amazing swimmer. You have no idea. I’m great.' And they were like, 'Oh wow, she’s a great… Hey, she’s a good swimmer.' Then I actually got on set and I just remember submerging under water and hearing, 'Cut! Oh my God, she is drowning! She is drowning right now. Somebody get her some floaties, something!' I guess I wasn’t that good. I was more talk."

Despite the intense subject matter, Paxton described her experience on set as a positive one and when asked about what it was like to work with the producers Wes Craven and Jonathan Craven, she stated:

"He was more like the Wizard of Oz – the man behind the curtains. He was really involved in everything, but he was manning the controls backing in the states since we filmed the movie in Africa. His son, Jonathan Craven, was an executive producer on the movie and he was amazing to work with. It was a great set to be on. They really cared about us, especially me because I was the youngest out of the group."

Dennis Iliadis, the director of the 2009 film, wanted to add more characterization and depth to the character of Mari and revealed that the writers decided to make her a competitive swimmer which attributes to her character development and survival later on in the film. In an interview, Iliadis stated:

"Well, the idea was to find something where she channels all her energy. That was a big character trait, because her brother is dead. It's like she's carrying him on her back; she needs to perform for two people now. She has to compensate for him. So all her energy's in the water. The only area where she feels slightly free is when she's in the water, swimming like crazy, so it's interesting having that as a character trait, and then having that as a key element for her trying to escape."

== Reception ==
Film critic Ann Hornaday likened her to horror genre heroines Sally Hardesty (Marilyn Burns) of The Texas Chain Saw Massacre (1974) and Laurie Strode (Jamie Lee Curtis) of Halloween (1978). Writing that they "personified the qualities and character beats of the quintessential final girl at her most admirable and frustrating." Film critic John Kenneth Muir described Mari as a "well-developed character."

In a detailed analysis, Alexandra Heller-Nicholas notes that the 2009 version of the character, unlike the original incarnation, exhibits traits of the "final girl" trope. Heller-Nicholas attributes this to her disinterest in drugs and her proactive nature during her abduction, highlighting that she purposefully lures the villains to her house as means of getting her parents to save her. She notes that the Iliadis version of the film "celebrates Mari's determination to survive," and as such condemns the 1972's passive version—although she notes a drastic shift in the character in the second half of the film. Writing that "This depiction of her as a vacant monster continues throughout the rest of the film. Mari is not so much a rape survivor as she is the walking dead, whose only function is to provide her parents (specifically her father) with a motivation for violent and spectacular vengeance." Hess (who portrayed Krug Stillo in 1972 film) stated that the audience holds a connection to the character due to there being an emotional attachment to Peabody's portrayal.

== See also ==
- Nancy Thompson
- Sidney Prescott
- Sally Hardesty
- Laurie Strode

== Bibliography ==
- Szulkin, David A. (2000). Wes Craven's Last House on the Left: The Making of a Cult Classic. Surrey, England: FAB Press. ISBN 1-903254-01-9.
