= Sally Hardesty =

Fictional character from The Texas Chainsaw Massacre franchise

- The Texas Chainsaw Massacre character
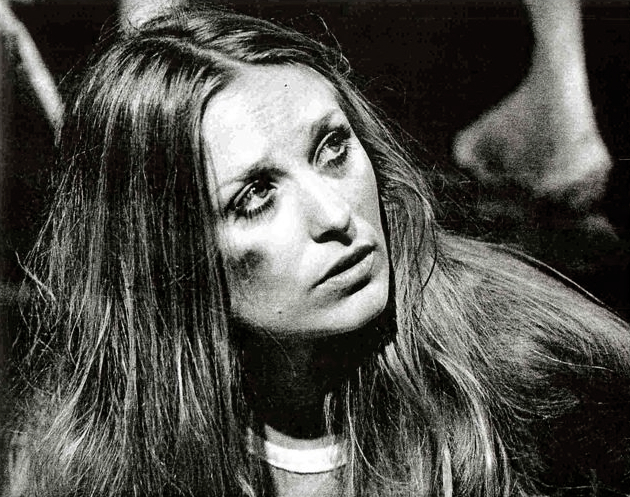
- Marilyn Burns as Sally Hardesty in The Texas Chain Saw Massacre (1974)
- First appearance: The Texas Chain Saw Massacre (1974)
- Last appearance: Texas Chainsaw Massacre (2022)
- Created by: Kim Henkel; Tobe Hooper
- Portrayed by: Marilyn Burns (1974); Elena Sanchez (2013); Olwen Fouéré (2022)

In-universe information
- Family: Ted Hardesty (father); Lefty Enright (uncle, deceased); Franklin Hardesty (brother, deceased); Unnamed Grandfather (deceased)
- Status: Deceased (original continuity)

Sally Hardesty is a fictional character in The Texas Chainsaw Massacre franchise. She made her first appearance in The Texas Chain Saw Massacre (1974) as a young woman investigating her grandfather’s grave after local grave robberies—crossing paths with Leatherface and his cannibalistic family in the process. Including the first film, Sally appears in three films of the franchise. Marilyn Burns portrays Sally in the first film, stunt performer Elena Sanchez briefly portrays the character in the opening of Texas Chainsaw 3D (2013), while Olwen Fouéré portrays the character in a supporting role in Texas Chainsaw Massacre (2022).

Filming for the original film was particularly challenging for Burns, who endured numerous injuries throughout the notoriously difficult shoot. While the character is noted for having little character development, Burns's visceral performance has been met with critical acclaim. The character has become a pop culture figure and is credited by film scholars as a catalyst for the final girl trope. Outside of film, the character has been included in merchandise.

== Appearances ==
The character made her cinematic debut in The Texas Chain Saw Massacre on October 11, 1974. Created by Kim Henkel and Tobe Hooper, in this film, Sally (Marilyn Burns) is a free-spirited young woman traveling across Texas with her brother Franklin and friends to investigate her grandfather's grave after a series of local grave robberies. After visiting the abandoned Hardesty homestead, their friends are murdered by the cannibalistic Leatherface and his sadistic family. While searching for them, Leatherface appears and kills Franklin and Sally is pursued and captured. Bound at the family's dinner table, she breaks free and escapes.

Burns briefly appears in a non-speaking cameo in The Return of the Texas Chainsaw Massacre (1995), credited as "Patient on Gurney". Writer-director Kim Henkel included the cameo to convey "an emotional connection between the Sally character and the Jenny character, a kind of perverse passing of the torch".

Sally returns in Texas Chainsaw Massacre (2022). Olwen Fouéré was recast as Sally following the passing of Burns in 2014. It is the first film since the original to feature Sally as a focal point, with her having a five-decade-long vendetta against Leatherface.

== Development ==
Marilyn Burns, a former University of Texas drama student, was working as a stand-in for Blythe Danner and Susan Sarandon in the drama film Lovin' Molly (1974). Burns met writer Kim Henkel and director Tobe Hooper when they snuck on the set, and she witnessed them getting kicked off. Burns knew of Hooper's previous work as a filmmaker, noting that as a young actress, she tried to make herself aware of as many filmmakers as possible. Shortly after this incident, Burns became a member of the newly formed Texas Film Commission and was aware that Hooper and Henkel were developing a film. Burns wanted to audition for them and ultimately got cast in the leading role of Sally.

Burns stated, "I believed in this movie from the beginning." Burns hoped the role would launch her career, and although she was the central character, she feared her scenes would get cut during editing. Due to her prior experience working on film sets, most of the cast assumed Burns was a screen veteran. Filming was difficult for Burns. Her costume was so drenched with fake blood that it was solid by the last day of shooting. Within two days after filming finished, she received a call to come back on the set and reshoot Sally's escape in the truck as something went wrong with the original footage. Burns was mentally and physically exhausted from the shoot. Burns stated the thing that upset her the most was nobody on the set ever praised her performance.

The original script for the 2003 remake was in flashback format, featuring an aged Sally recounting her experience with Leatherface to authorities; Burns had several conversations with the studio about reprising her role although this version of the film got scrapped. Olwen Fouéré was cast as Sally in David Blue Garcia's Texas Chainsaw Massacre (2022), a direct sequel to the original film, following the death of Burns in 2014. Before being cast, Fouéré was unfamiliar with the series and was unaware of the popularity of the Sally character. In preparation, she studied Burns' expressions and physicality, although she wanted to create her version of a character living fifty years after a traumatic event.

== Popular culture ==
Hardesty was a featured character, alongside Leatherface, in Universal Orlando's 2012 Texas Chainsaw Massacre: The Saw is the Law Halloween Horror Nights amusement park attraction—appearing during a reenactment of the dinner table sequence from the 1974 film. American singer Tinashe made an homage to the character in the music video to her 333 (2021) single "Naturally" in a sequence featuring the singer covered in blood and laughing maniacally in the back of a pickup truck. In October 2023, it was revealed at Toy Fair that Trick or Treat Studios would be releasing an action figure of Sally.

== Reception ==
In Making and Remaking Horror in the 1970s and 2000s: Why Don't They Do It Like They Used To?, David Roche contrasts Sally to Laurie Strode from the Halloween series stating: "All in all, Sally Hardesty and Laurie Strode have very little in common, apart from the fact that both characters survive the horror they have witnessed" and goes on to say that "Sally, the hippie, is very 'feminine' and not especially heroic: she undergoes intense suffering, attempts to sell her body, and seems to lose her mind. Sally is, in effect, the most resisting body. As such, the character of Sally simultaneously enables the Family to attempt to assert its masculinity in the face of the abject female and contributes to the discovery of the instability of sexist patriarchal values by bearing witness to the way the Family's mimicry of patriarchy reveals its constructiveness; these two functions coalesce in the shots of Sally's eyes. I would, thus, argue that the character of Sally by no means represents a feminist development, but her resilience does enable an anti-essentialist subtext to emerge to some extent". However, James Rose believes that Sally and Laurie have a lot of similarities, describing:

Possibly the most significant impact Hooper's film has had upon the horror genre is its sustained trauma of Sally Hardesty. The juxtaposition of her terrible plight but eventual survival seemingly reconfigured the genre and created, as Clover has termed it, the character of the Final Girl. Yet, for all her endurance, Sally is not the first Final Girl but more a survivor who stands alongside Halloween's Laurie Strode (Jamie Lee Curtis); for as much as both survive, each, in the end, requires male intervention to fully save them from the narrative's male antagonist: Sally is rescued by a passing driver, while Laurie is saved by Dr Loomis (Donald Pleasance [sic]). Despite this, both Sally and Laurie combine to make manifest the key attributes of the Final Girl as both struggled, endured and, in Laurie's case, attacked their aggressor until they could escape and be saved. In the slasher films that followed in the wake of Chain Saw and Halloween, the Final Girl steadily gains in strength until she herself vanquishes the male antagonist.

He goes on to state the difference between the two:

It is this that prevents Sally from being a true Final Girl, for she (unlike Laurie and all the others that followed) never turns upon her aggressors and attacks them. Instead, she simply endures, runs from them and, by chance seizes an opportunity to escape. However, this is not to disagree with Clover's positioning of Sally as a Final Girl, as she does indeed endure, and it is this that makes her so noteworthy.

Editor Stefano Lo Verme compared Burns' performance as Sally to the performances of Sandra Peabody as Mari Collingwood in The Last House on the Left (1972) and Jamie Lee Curtis as Laurie Strode in Halloween (1978).

== Works cited ==
- Hansen, Gunnar (2013). Chain Saw Confidential. Chronicle Books. ISBN 978-1-45-212950-1.
- Macor, Alison (February 22, 2010). Chainsaws, Slackers, and Spy Kids. University of Texas Press. p. 20. ISBN 978-0-29-277829-0.
