= Voices of Desire =

- Theatrical release poster
- Directed by: Chuck Vincent (as Mark Ubell)
- Starring: Sandra Peabody; Gus Thomas; Marlene Willoughby
- Release date: October 11, 1972
- Running time: 71 minutes
- Countries: United States; Japan
- Language: English
- Budget: $9,000

Voices of Desire is a 1972 horror film directed by Chuck Vincent under the stage name Mark Ubell. The film stars Sandra Peabody (credited as Liyda [sic] Cassell), Gus Thomas, and Marlene Willoughby. The plot concerns a young woman named Anna Reed (Peabody) who recounts her claims to a psychiatrist that she was involved with a cult whose members were either murdered or committed suicide after she begins hearing distorted voices.

== Plot ==
Detective Holland calls in Anna Reed to recount her claims that she was involved in a cult whose members were either murdered or committed suicide. Anna narrates a series of flashbacks.

She receives a call at a telephone booth in the city one day, and hears voices calling her name. This causes her to become possessed. Later, at home, she is suddenly overcome by a force, which causes her to give into pleasure.

The possession leads her to a mansion, where she is seduced by a group of ghoulish hosts. Anna attempts to escape, but is ultimately overcome.

At the end, the film returns to the present, where Anna is talking to the detective. Anna wanders back out into the city, where she hears the voices again. The film ends showing the door to the mansion being thrown open, with the ghoulish cult there waiting for her.

== Cast ==
- Sandra Peabody as Anna Reed
- Gus Thomas as Guy Thomas
- Marlene Willoughby as Female Ghoul

== Reception ==
The film has generally received positive reviews. Luna Guthrie said "this movie most definitely has style, to the point where you may even refer to it as 'arty' in a very guerrilla way. By today's vomit-inducing standards, Voices of Desire is most certainly not porn, and it probably takes more of a sentimental person like myself to enjoy it. It is far more appealing to see lovers enjoying and embracing each other's bodies than abusing and objectifying them. This is a fun, relatively sexy, delight from the long lost annals of psychedelia." In Cashiers du Cinemart 17, Mike White states:

"Vincent's first full-length feature is an odd horror/sex hybrid, sometimes mistaken as pornography as he used his Mark Ubell name for the director's credit. Last House on the Left's Sandra Peabody (billed here as Lydia Cassell) plays Anna, a young woman who is seeing a psychologist because she keeps hearing voices."
"Vincent's love for films is on display here - Anna's apartment includes posters for M and The Blue Angel, so I wouldn't be shocked at all if this was, in fact, Vincent's apartment as a shooting location. The film feel of the film seems less interested in depicting erotic sex than to create a sense of unease, and it's got a lot more Carnival of Souls than Deep Throat. The story of a woman slowly going insane in the guise of erotic thrills is one to which Vincent would return much later, in Deranged and Bad Blood."

== Release ==
Voices of Desire was released on DVD by Something Weird Video.
