= Massage Parlor Murders! =

1973 American horror film

Massage Parlor Murders
- Promotional artwork
- Directed by: Chester Fox; Alex Stevens
- Starring: Sandra Peabody; George Spencer; John Moser; Brother Theodore; George Dzundza
- Cinematography: Victor Petrashevic
- Release date: April 16, 1975 (Terre Haute, Indiana)
- Running time: 80 minutes
- Country: United States
- Language: English

Massage Parlor Murders! is a 1973 American horror film directed by Chester Fox and Alex Stevens. The film stars George Spencer, John Moser, Sandra Peabody, Brother Theodore and George Dzundza, who respectively portray Rizotti, Detective O'Mara, Gwen, Theodore, and Mr. Creepy. The film revolves around the detectives Rizotti (Spencer) and O'Mara (Moser) as they investigate the murders of massage parlor workers in the New York area. Marketed as being similar in tone to Alfred Hitchcock's psychological horror film Psycho (1960), the film was released into drive-in theaters and the grindhouse circuit in 1973. Subsequently, the film began to be advertised as a sexploitation film and was released under the title Massage Parlor Hookers! with the horror film elements being removed. The film did not have a home video release until 2013.

== Plot ==
Detective Rizotti and his partner Detective O'Mara begin investigating the mysterious murders that have recently started happening in the red-light district of New York's massage parlors. After Rosie, a girl that Detective Rizotti visited often at the massage parlor, is murdered, Detective O'Mara goes to talk to Rosie's roommate Gwen, whom he eventually becomes romantically involved with.

Gwen is asked if she has any insights on who the killer might be and she tells him about a man that Rosie called "Mr. Creepy", who made her uncomfortable. The detectives locate the mysterious man and see him exit his apartment; they follow and catch him, and demand that he leave town.

The murders continue to happen, however. Gwen, who works at the Lust Lounge massage parlor, reveals to O'Mara that she does not have sex with her clients and instead acts more like a shrink. Rizotti later attends church with his wife and he then believes the killer is a "religious nut", using the seven deadly sins as his motive.

Rizotti goes to pick up Detective O'Mara and they go to a book store and look up the seven deadly sins and start to piece everything together. They realize that the killer is mutilating the massage parlors workers because their job had a correlation with a deadly sin, the Mad Hatter for anger, the Everybody's Envy massage parlor for envy, and the Lust Lounge for lust, which is the parlor Gwen works for.

The cops rush to the Lust Lounge in a desperate attempt to save Gwen from the killer, only to find her dead. The movie ends with another massage parlor girl being attacked by the killer. She frantically fights back, throwing hot oil on him, which kills him when he catches on fire.

== Cast ==
- George Spencer as Rizotti
- John Moser as Detective O'Mara
- Sandra Peabody as Gwen
- Brother Theodore as Theodore
- George Dzundza as Mr. Creepy
- Anne Gaybis as Sunny
- Chris Jordan as Rosie

== Release ==
The film was released on the drive-in and grindhouse circuit. It opened in Terre Haute, Indiana, on April 16, 1975.

== Home video ==
In 2013, Vinegar Syndrome released the film on DVD and Blu-ray. This release featured the original and alternate theatrical trailer, rare outtakes, a special edition lab card and extensive historical liner notes.

== Reception ==
The film has been met with generally positive reviews. In a contemporary review, Michael Hauss of Theatre of Guts gave a positive review stating, "This film is odd. It is so unbalanced and bizarre that it jolts your sensibilities at times. It has scenes that lead nowhere, it has some good acting performances and some downright awful acting at times, badly framed and edited shots, murky camera work, but, the bottom line is it is a dirty, gritty, sleazy, funky, fun romp." Brian Orndof of Blu-ray.com gave the film a positive review, stating:

"Massage Parlor Murders isn't much of a movie, but it's a heck of a viewing experience, packing in enough violence, vague confrontations, and nudity to satisfy those in the mood for gratuitous, no-budget entertainment."
"The amazing thing about Massage Parlor Murders is that there's maybe 20 minutes' worth of actual narrative during the entire 80-minute run time. The rest of the work is devoted to the fine art of padding, where we watch O'Mara and Gwen take a tour of the town on their various date nights, strolling past street posters and glowing marquees, bumping into pedestrians clearly unaware they've stumbled into a movie shoot. There's plenty of driving and waiting, while most shots linger on a few seconds longer than they should to inch Massage Parlor Murders to feature-length status. Helping to fill out the fun are a few unique visions, including a visit to a private pool filled with swingers out to celebrate the sexual revolution while soaked in chlorine and wayward bodily fluids. The detour into wet flesh and balloon close-ups (the film is at least 25% random cutaways) is meant to tie into O'Mara and Gwen's passionate union, but the concept never quite sticks, instead coming across as easy access to even more nudity in a picture that's already loaded with sin. For action enthusiasts, there's a car chase wedged in here to pump up heart rates, watching O'Mara (clad only in a gym towel) chase a suspect through NYC streets, smashing through a vegetable stand to add some punctuation to an otherwise routine display of spinning and squealing automobiles."
"Performances are adequate for such a primitive endeavor, but for the curious, Massage Parlor Murders features a return to the screen for Peabody, who played the doomed Mari in Wes Craven's The Last House on the Left, while character actor George Dzundza pops up as suspect Rizotti works over prematurely, with the recognizable performer (who went on to appear in Basic Instinct and Dangerous Minds) also credited as an assistant director. Let's hope he's responsible for the few properly framed moments of the movie."

Last Road Reviews said, "For a low-budget exploitation film the acting is actually fairly decent at least from the main cast". The review also praised the film's score, noting that it helped the "scenes with no dialogue and only music".

== Legacy ==
The film was featured on Flavorwire's article "50 Films That Capture the Dark Side of New York City".
