= Sandra Peabody =

American talent agent, producer and former actress

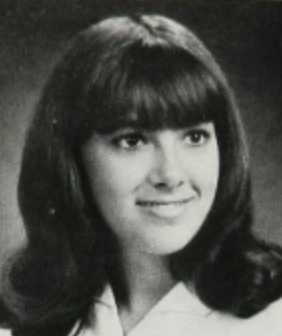
- Peabody in 1966
- Born: Sandra Lee Peabody; January 11, 1948 (age 78); Portland, Oregon, U.S.
- Education: Carnegie Mellon University
- Occupations: Talent agent; acting coach; producer; actress; fashion model
- Years active: 1965–present
- Spouse: Timothy Stubelek
- Children: 1

Sandra Peabody (born January 11, 1948) is an American producer, writer, acting coach, talent agent, and retired actress. Peabody is best known for her role as Mari Collingwood in Wes Craven's directorial debut horror film The Last House on the Left (1972), as well as her subsequent career as a producer of children's programming on cable television, which earned her accolades including an Emmy Award and a CableACE Award.

Peabody began her career as a teen actress in Fort Lauderdale, Florida. First appearing in the professional stage production Enter Laughing (1965) as Wanda during her senior year of high school, Peabody later forayed into acting in feature films, such as the South Florida shot films Misfit (1965) and The Horse Killer (1966). In 1966, Peabody began studying drama at Carnegie Mellon University and began training in the Meisner technique directly from acting teacher Sanford Meisner at the Neighborhood Playhouse School of the Theatre.

Peabody appeared on stage in The Odd Couple, Stop the World – I Want to Get Off (both 1969), the off-Broadway folk rock musical Tarot (1970), which opened at the Brooklyn Academy of Music, and most notably Minnie Oakley in the musical Annie Get Your Gun (1973), starring opposite of Barbara Eden. Peabody had roles in films such as the drama film Love-In '72 (1971), the horror films Voices of Desire (1972) and Massage Parlor Murders! (1973), and the cult sex comedy Teenage Hitchhikers (1974).

Peabody retired from acting by the mid-1970s and taught theatrical training for children at the American Academy of Dramatic Arts before moving to Portland, Oregon and launching a successful career in cable television as a children's television producer, beginning in 1982. Her producing and writing credits include the show Get Movin' (1982) and the award-winning series Popcorn (1984-1992).

== Early life ==
Sandra Lee Peabody was born on January 11, 1948, in Portland, Oregon.

As a teenager, Peabody lived in Fort Lauderdale, Florida where she attended Stranahan High School. In high school, Peabody succeeded in academics, was a varsity cheerleader, and developed an interest in acting—becoming involved in school plays. Outside of school, she began to be cast in local professional theatre productions.

== Acting career ==
=== 1960s: Feature films and stage work ===
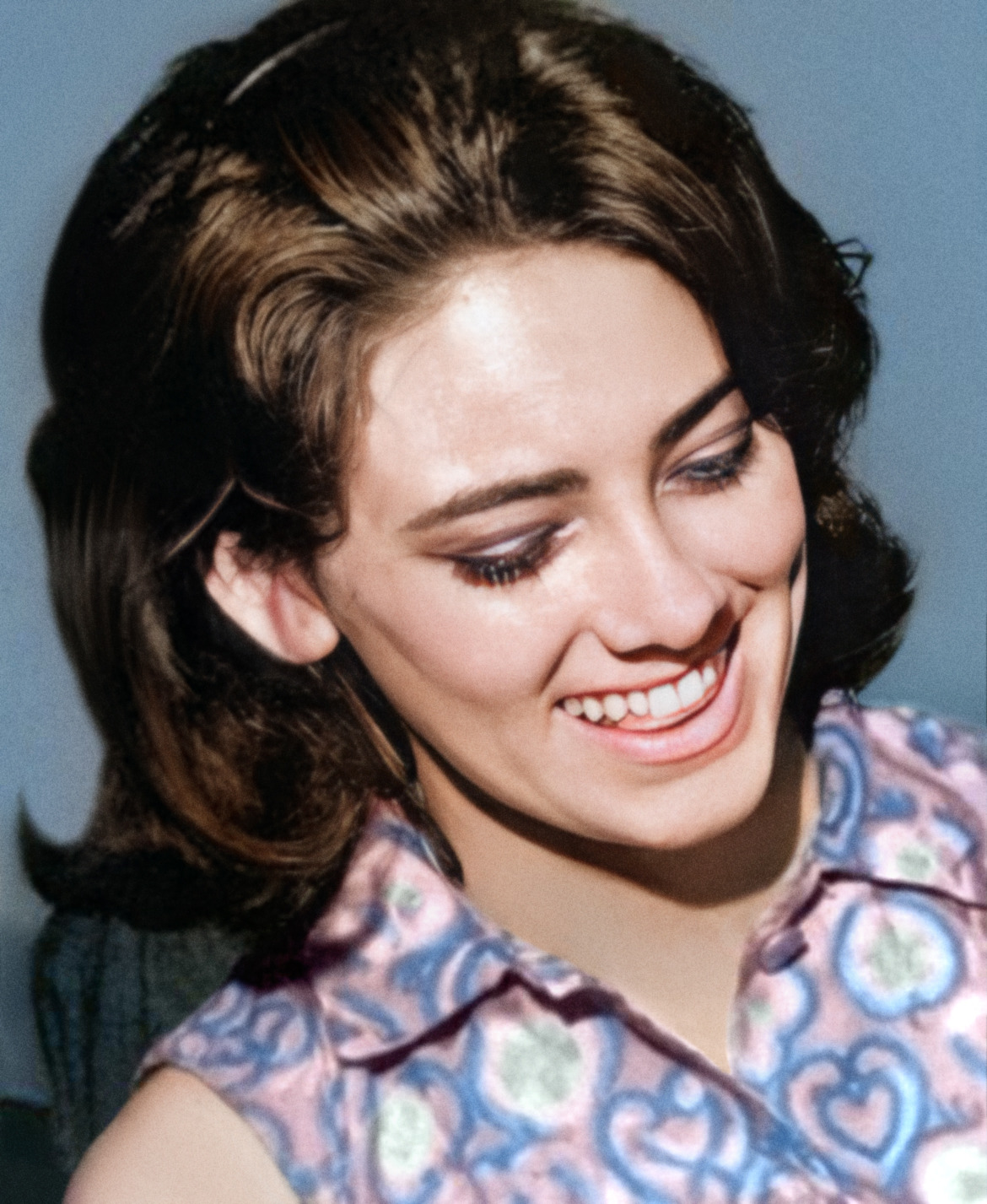
Peabody in 1965

In 1964, Peabody got cast in the one-act play, Riders to the Sea, which opened at Florida State University in July. Burgeoning as a teen actress, Peabody got cast in a leading role as a drug-addicted teenager in Bob O'Donnell's religious educational film Misfit (1965), which was her feature film debut. The film was produced by a New York-based production company, and although Peabody was not the original choice for the role, she got cast after the leading actress became sick before filming began.

During her senior year, Peabody was cast in another professional play called Enter Laughing (1966), as Wanda, the girlfriend of the main character. The play opened in January 1966 at the Hollywood Little Theater in Florida to favorable reviews, with her acting in the cemetery scene highlighted. Peabody subsequently portrayed Beauty in a play adaptation of Beauty and the Beast and Katie Brown in the play Calamity Jane (both in 1966). Peabody's next film role was in Luke Moberly's mystery film The Horse Killer (1966). In a retrospective interview, Peabody said she played the girlfriend. She described the film as having an unusual story and her scenes involving a lot of horseback riding.

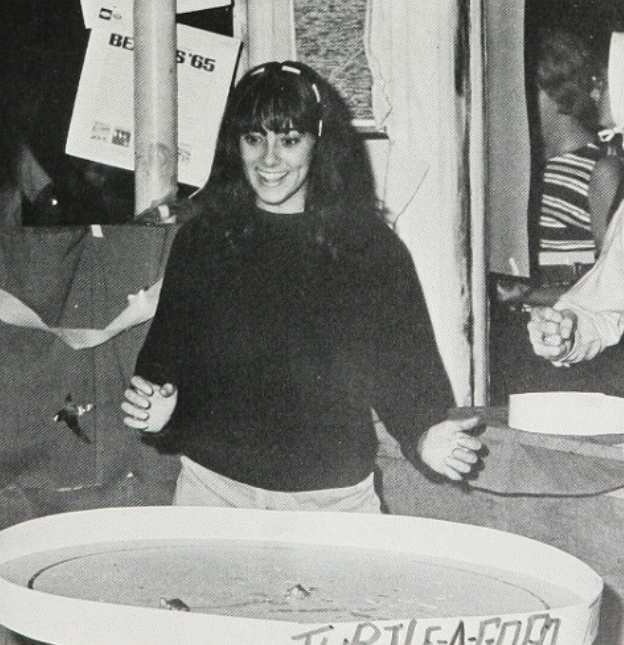
Peabody in 1966

After graduating high school in 1966, Peabody had a scholarship in dramatics to attend Florida State University. However, she decided to attend Carnegie Mellon University to study drama. In 1967, she was selected to do summer stock at the Priscilla Beach Theater in Plymouth, Massachusetts as an actress-in-training. The same year, Peabody was selected to study the Meisner technique with acting teacher Sanford Meisner at the Neighborhood Playhouse School of the Theatre. In 1969, she had a role as Gwendolyn Pigeon in Neil Simon's The Odd Couple. Critic Mariruth Campbell of The Journal News described her as being a "most competent" actress. Peabody was later a part of the stage plays Celebration, Little Mary Sunshine, and Stop the World – I Want to Get Off (all in 1969).

=== 1970–1972: Breakthrough with The Last House on the Left ===
In 1970, Peabody had a supporting role as The Sun in the Robert Kalfin and The Rubber Duck directed Off-Broadway production Tarot, which ran at the Brooklyn Academy of Music. An experimental folk rock-mime musical based on tarot cards, it opened to a lackluster reception: a review for The New York Times describes the show as "pompous, inefficient and amateurish", although the music received praise. One of the first feature film roles Peabody signed onto in New York was the low budget sexploitation satire film The Filthiest Show in Town (1970), a parody of dating game shows. Peabody appeared in the film's fictitious commercial segments as a character named Olga. Peabody later had roles in the drama film Love-In '72 (1970) and Chuck Vincent's Manhattan-set horror film Voices of Desire (1971).

Peabody's breakthrough role would occur when she got cast as the protagonist Mari Collingwood in Wes Craven's directorial debut The Last House on the Left (1972), a controversial rape and revenge horror film and a loose remake of Ingmar Bergman's The Virgin Spring (1960). Peabody responded to a casting notice for the film in the New York industry trade publication Backstage and set up an audition at producer Sean S. Cunningham's office. Craven and Cunningham originally wanted Peabody to read for the role of Phyllis (portrayed by Lucy Grantham); after they met her, they decided to cast her as Mari. Discussions had been held with prior actors cast about filming it as an X-rated film; however, by the time Peabody signed on, she was told the script was going to be rewritten as a traditional horror film and would not include pornography.

By the time of filming, the script was incomplete, which Peabody reflected: "I remember once we were riding a train from New York to Westport, and somebody from the movie said to me, 'Sandra, you look like a cow that’s just been slaughtered!' I said, 'Well, that’s because I don’t really know how the script is going to be changed.' The thought of a lot of these scenes upset me, and a lot of the time, I wasn’t quite sure what was going to be done until we actually did it." Costar Fred J. Lincoln claimed that Peabody was genuinely afraid, "... she left the production after one or two days, and we had to talk her into coming back!" Peabody stated that she struggled with the sexual assault scenes in the forest. Craven recalled working with a young Peabody: "I liked Sandra Peabody a lot; I thought she was very pretty, and very plucky ... because she was a very young actress, she wasn’t nearly as confident and easygoing as Lucy was, and she had become involved in something that was very, very rough. And she hung in there. When the character was raped, she was treated very roughly, and I know Sandra said to me afterwards, 'My God ... I had the feeling they really hated me.'"

Peabody had a turbulent work relationship with David Hess, whom she described as a method actor who was "trying to live his part." In a 2008 retrospective interview with writer Jason Zinoman for Vanity Fair, Hess asserted that he was very mean towards her throughout filming and that she did not have to act during the filming of her character’s rape scene: "I told her, 'I'm really going to fuck you if you don't behave yourself. They'll just let the camera run. I'm going to devastate you.' I don't think she was too happy about that." Upon release, the film was a commercial success, earning more than $2 million at the American box office. Peabody believes Craven and Cunningham succeeded with the film, given their limited resources. Besides acting in the film, she also performed her own stunts.

=== 1973–1977: Career expansion and retirement from acting ===
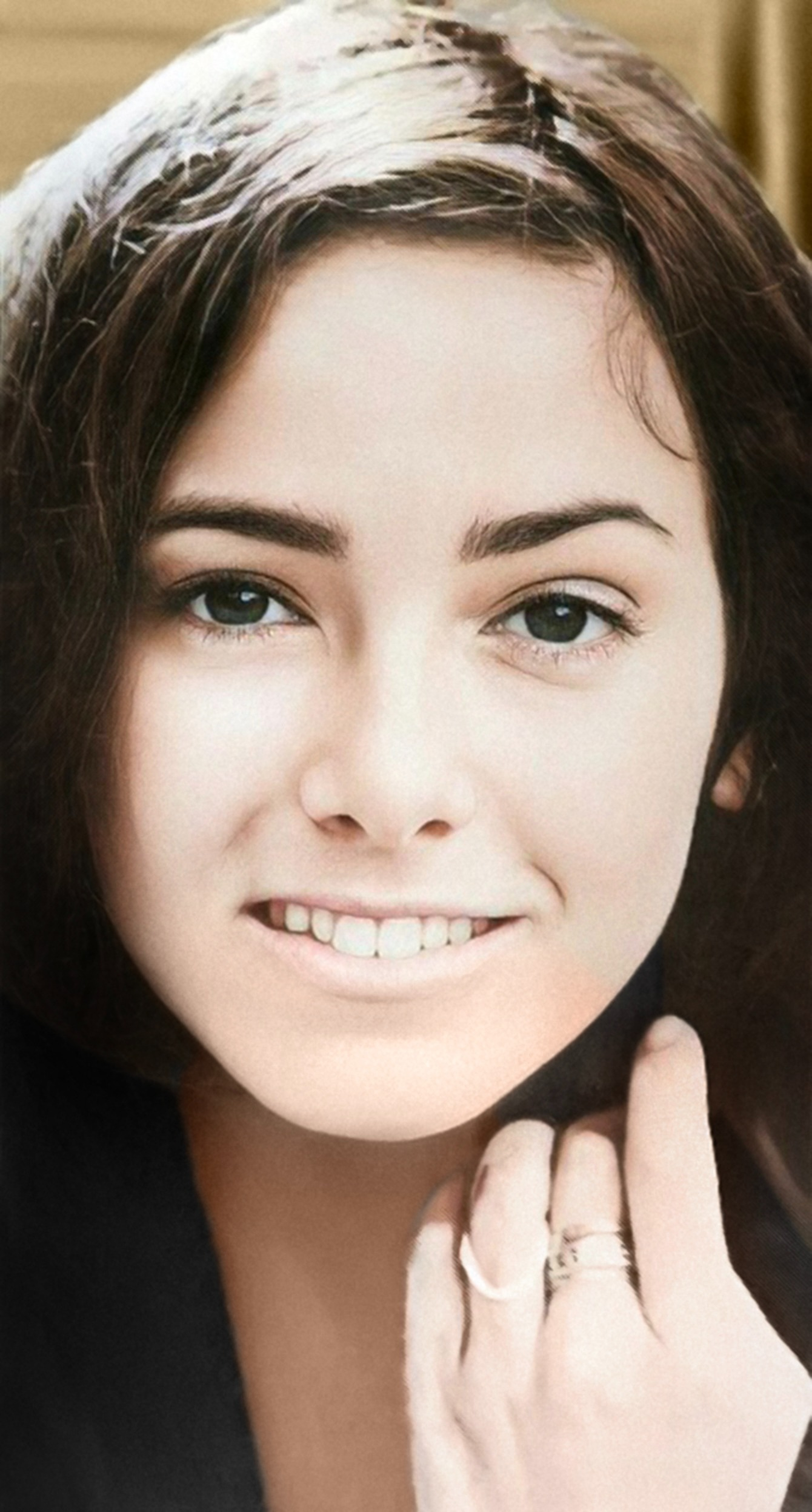
Peabody in 1973

In 1973, Peabody had a leading role as masseuse Gwen in the New York shot Massage Parlor Murders! (1973) and a non-speaking bit part as a cult member in Legacy of Satan (1973)—both exploitation horror films. Peabody had a sporadic television career in the early 1970s, appearing on the soap operas All My Children, As the World Turns, The Edge of Night, and One Life to Live in supporting roles, along with various commercial appearances for products such as breakfast cereal.

Peabody also worked as a model; however, she was not fond of this field of work. In an interview, she described models as being a "bitchy lot" and stating soap operas do not allow people to develop their skills as professionals, believing it to be entirely about pursuing jobs. During this time frame, while pursuing casting calls, Peabody struggled to get acting jobs for characters her age, so she signed with a children's agent. Peabody would later have another career-defining role in 1973 when she returned to acting on stage as Minnie Oakley in Jay Harnick's acclaimed musical comedy Annie Get Your Gun (1973-1974), acting alongside Barbara Eden as the titular Annie Oakley. Peabody's portrayal received praise: writer Jonathan Takiff of Philadelphia Daily News stated that she was believable as an actress.

In 1974, Peabody starred in the sex comedy Teenage Hitchhikers opposite Kathie Christopher. The story is about a duo of teenage runaways traveling West. She played Bird, one of the quick-witted girls. Her performance received positive reviews: one critic, Linda Gross, wrote for Los Angeles Times that her performance was "ingenious", while a review written for DVD Talk praises her comic timing capabilities. It has since become a cult film and is one of filmmaker Quentin Tarantino's favorite films. It was included in the QT Six Lineup at the Quentin Tarantino Film Festival in 2005—shown in 35 mm movie film. Peabody later worked as the script supervisor for the sex comedy Video Vixens (1975). Peabody's last acting credit is the stage production Tunnel of Love (1977). After retiring from acting, Peabody taught theater techniques to children at the American Academy of Dramatic Arts until 1982.

== Producer and acting coach career ==
In 1982, Peabody conceptualized the Cablesystems Pacific local late-night talk show Portland Tonight. She was heavily inspired by The Tonight Show (1962-1992) with Johnny Carson and wanted to make it Portland-oriented. Peabody wrote, directed, and produced the variety show Get Movin' (1982), which earned her a CableACE Award in 1983. Peabody conceptualized the series at a time when networks began to decrease funding for children's programming. Peabody wanted the series to prominently involve children's ideas, asking them to submit their interests in a survey conducted in the November 1982 issue of the Portland Children's Museum newspaper Boing!, in addition to holding auditions at the cable company's studio to showcase local talent. The series lasted for a 26-episode season.

Subsequently, Peabody produced the children's public broadcasting series Popcorn (1985–92) for the television station KATU, which debuted as a prime-time special in 1985 before being picked up as a weekly series in September 1986. For this series, Peabody signed a contract with KATU. The series received critical acclaim, with writer Judy McDermott of The Oregonian stating it is "an unabashed celebration of children". Peabody said in an interview that the inspiration for the series came from her believing, "There's still a lot of the kid left in me." As a producer, the series earned Peabody an Emmy Award, a NAB award, and two Iris Awards. In 1993, KATU canceled the series, and Peabody was laid off.

In 1988, Peabody developed A Time to Care (1988), a television documentary film that focuses on local nursing homes and the positive effects that community volunteerism has on the residents. She stated that it's "a neat idea for a series because what they're basically saying is that more than ever people are reaching out to help others." The broadcasting division Group W picked up the series for distribution and syndication. In 1994, Peabody served as the casting director for the children's musical home video Wee Sing: Under the Sea. Peabody wrote and produced the educational public television series Zone In (2001) revolving around "tough issues for kids".

Since the 2000s, Peabody has worked as an acting coach and talent agent at theater schools such as Northwest Children's Theater. Peabody has taught the Meisner technique she was trained with during her youth to a younger generation and has helped launch the acting careers of several child actors such as Bret Harrison and Alicia Lagano and has provided guidance to those studying under her with both entering and navigating the industry. In 2015, Peabody directed the first episode of LTC TV—a series detailing events occurring at Lakewood Center for the Arts in Lake Oswego, Oregon.

== Personal life ==
In the early 1970s, Peabody lived in Greenwich Village, New York City. In the summer of 1971, she embarked on a cross-country road trip from New York to the West Coast. In 1973, Peabody stated that she studied both free-form jazz dance and Transcendental Meditation.

While filming The Last House on the Left, Peabody developed a close relationship with cinematographer Victor Hurwitz. She described Hurwitz as being a "fatherly kind of guy" towards her and was saddened by his death after he was hit by a vehicle while riding his bicycle a few years after the release of the film. Reflecting on their bond, Peabody recalled that Hurwitz advised her, "Have something else in your life besides acting because it's a terrible business." After filming Teenage Hitchhikers, Peabody continued communication with director Jerome S. Kaufmann through letters. Peabody has lived in Portland, Oregon since the 1980s. Peabody is married to Timothy Stubelek. They have a son together.

== Filmography ==
=== Film ===
Year	Title	Role	Notes	References
1965	Misfit	(Note: While Peabody is confirmed to have appeared, her role is undisclosed.)	Credited as Sandy Peabody	
1966	The Horse Killer	(Note: While Peabody is confirmed to have appeared, her role is undisclosed.)	Credited as Sandy Peabody	
1970	Love-In '72	Linda	Uncredited	
1972	The Last House on the Left	Mari Collingwood	Credited as Sandra Cassell	
1972	Voices of Desire	Anna Reed	Credited as Liyda Cassell	
1973	Massage Parlor Murders!	Gwen	Working title was The Seven Deadly Sins	
1973	Legacy of Satan	Cult Extra	Cameo	
1973	The Filthiest Show in Town	Olga	Credited as Sandra Cassel	
1974	Teenage Hitchhikers	Bird		
1975	Video Vixens	(Note: Peabody does not act in this film)	Script continuity	
1988	A Time to Care	(Note: Peabody does not act in this film)	Producer, documentary film	
1994	Wee Sing: Under the Sea	(Note: Peabody does not act in this film)	Casting director, home video	

=== Stage ===
Year	Title	Role	References
1965	Enter Laughing	Wanda	
1966	Beauty and the Beast	Beauty	
1966	Calamity Jane	Katie Brown	
1969	Celebration		
1969	The Odd Couple	Gwendolyn Pigeon	
1969	Stop the World – I Want to Get Off	Little Chap's Daughter	
1969	Little Mary Sunshine	Young Lady of the Eastchester Finishing School	
1970	Tarot	The Sun	
1973–1974	Annie Get Your Gun	Minnie Oakley	
1977	Tunnel of Love		

=== Television ===
Year	Title	Role	Notes	References
(Note: Year date unknown.)	All My Children		Undisclosed number of episodes	
(Note: Year date unknown.)	As the World Turns		Undisclosed number of episodes	
(Note: Year date unknown.)	The Edge of Night		Undisclosed number of episodes	
(Note: Year date unknown.)	One Life to Live		Undisclosed number of episodes	
1982	Portland Tonight	(Note: Peabody does not act in this series)	Producer	
1982	Get Movin'	(Note: Peabody does not act in this series)	26-episodes; writer, director, producer	
1985–1992	Popcorn	(Note: Peabody does not act in this series)	Writer, director, producer	
2001	Zone In	(Note: Peabody does not act in this series)	Writer and producer	
2015	LTC TV	(Note: Peabody does not act in this series)	1 episode; director and editor	

== Awards ==
Year	Award	Category	Nominated work	Result	References
1983	CableACE Award	Excellence in Local Programming	Get Movin'	Won	
1987	NAB award	Service to Children Award	Popcorn	Won	
1989	Iris Award	Excellence in Children's Programming	Popcorn	Won	
1990	Iris Award	Excellence in Children's Programming	Popcorn	Won	
1992	Emmy Award	Outstanding Public Service Announcement or In-House Campaign Category	Popcorn	Won	

== Works cited ==
- Lentz, Harris M. (1994). Science Fiction, Horror & Fantasy Film and Television Credits. McFarland. ISBN 978-0-89-950927-3.
- Sumner, Don (2010). Horror Movie Freak. Krause Publications. ISBN 978-1-440-21564-3.
- Szulkin, David A. (2000). Wes Craven's Last House on the Left: The Making of a Cult Classic. Surrey, England: FAB Press. ISBN 1-903254-01-9.
- Weismann, Brad (September 5, 2023). Horror Unmasked: A History of Terror from Nosferatu to Nope. becker&mayer!. p. 153. ISBN 978-0-76-037679-9.
