= Marlene Willoughby =

American pornographic actress

- Born: Detroit, Michigan, U.S.
- Occupations: Adult film actress; model

Marlene Willoughby is an American former adult film actress and model who also made occasional appearances in mainstream film, television and theatre.

== Biography ==
Willoughby was born in Detroit, Michigan and sang in the local church choir growing up. In 1961 she moved to New York with her mother and older sister Jacqueline, who was pursuing a career as a singer. She is of Polish and Italian decent.

She chose the surname "Willoughby" for her professional work after someone called her "willowy". She followed her older sister, Jacqueline Carol, in pursuing a career in show business.

In 1969 she appeared for eight months in the experimental Off-Off-Broadway play Che! by Lennox Raphael, where she played both a nymphomaniacal nun and Fidel Castro Other theater roles followed including the Obie Award–winning Dracula Sabbat, where she played the chief female vampire, Fuck Mother, and Keepers of the Hippo Horn.

Willoughby also landed parts in mainstream fare such as No Place to Hide (1970), Up the Sandbox (1972), I, the Jury (1982) and Trading Places (1983), and softcore work such as Voices of Desire (1972) and While the Cat's Away... (1972). Following her retirement from porn, she also appeared in the mainstream film Married to the Mob (1988). She was noted for often delivering her acting performances in a Tongue-in-cheek manner.

Willoughby began making hardcore porn in 1975. Her notable appearances include The Opening of Misty Beethoven (1976), The Farmer's Daughters (1976), Outlaw Ladies (1981), and Foxtrot.

She appeared in many adult magazines, most notably the December 1980 issue of Penthouse, and also wrote columns for such magazines as High Society and Velvet. She also arranged film release parties and toured as a Burlesque dancer. During her career in porn Willoughby was known as an activist speaking out in favor of the porn industry.
