= Future-Kill =

- Theatrical release poster
- Directed by: Ronald W. Moore
- Written by: Ronald W. Moore; Edwin Neal; Gregg Unterberger; John H. Best
- Produced by: John H. Best
- Starring: Edwin Neal; Marilyn Burns
- Cinematography: Jon H. Lewis
- Edited by: Leon Seith; Charles Simmons
- Music by: Robert Renfrow
- Distributed by: International Film Marketing
- Release date: June 7, 1985
- Running time: 89 minutes
- Country: United States
- Language: English
- Budget: $400,000

Future-Kill (released in the UK as Night of the Alien) is a 1985 comedy science fiction-horror film about a group of fraternity boys who are hunted by mutants in a futuristic city. The film was directed by Ronald W. Moore, and stars Edwin Neal (who also co-wrote the film), Marilyn Burns and Gabriel Folse. The poster for the film was designed by H. R. Giger.

== Plot ==
A group of protesters who call themselves "mutants" have taken over the inner city streets of a large city. They dress weirdly to try to show the effects of toxic poisoning. One of the mutants, Splatter, has really been affected.

A group of fraternity boys decide to go into the mutant territory and kidnap one of the mutants as a prank. They are inadvertently framed for the murder of the mutant leader and are hunted through the abandoned buildings and dark streets by the crazed Splatter and his gang.

== Cast ==
- Edwin Neal as Splatter
- Marilyn Burns as Dorothy Grim
- Gabriel Folse as Paul
- Wade Reese as Steve
- Barton Faulks as Tom
- Rob Rowley as Jay
- Craig Kanne as Clint
- Jeffrey Scott as George
- Alice Villarreal as Julie
- Doug Davis as Eddie Pain
- Bruce Falke as Really Cool Frat

== Production ==
Ronald W. Moore initially wrote the film with partners John Best and Kathy Hagan under the title Splatter but changed it to Future-Kill in order to avoid confusion with Splatter University and because he wanted to avoid the misconception blood and gore were the main selling point.

Moore then took the project to Texas business man Don Barker who was sold on the film's low budget as well as the presence of Edwin Neal and Marilyn Burns from the hit The Texas Chain Saw Massacre. The initial filming was done in August 1983 in various parts of Austin, Texas, while the effects shots done in February 1984 totaling about six and half weeks of shooting.

The film was shot using a Panavision camera and lens on 35mm film, with an aspect ratio of 1.85:1.

== Reception ==
Critical reception for the film has been mixed to negative. Allmovie gave the film a mixed review stating, "Filled with all sorts of anti-nuclear mumbo jumbo bred straight out of the Cold War Reagan era, Future Kill is slightly interesting for its relative place in history, but better viewed as '80s trash cinema whose long life on home video spawned more memories of its box art than anything else." Felix Vasquez Jr. from Cinema Crazed gave the film a negative review calling the film, "immensely dated and standard science fiction punk flick from the era of leather jackets and Mohawks". TV Guide awarded the film 2 out of 4 stars stating that it "serve[d] no purpose but to sate juvenile blood lust and to take people's money".

== Home media ==
The film was released on DVD by Subversive Cinema on October 31, 2006, in widescreen formatting and included a "Making of" featurette, full length commentary by the director Ronald Moore and the producer/star Edwin Neal, cast and crew biographies and a reproduction of Giger's original artwork.
