= Birds Do It =

1966 film by Andrew Marton

- Original film poster
- Directed by: Andrew Marton
- Written by: Art Arthur, Arnie Kogen, Leonard Kaufman (Story)
- Produced by: Stanley Colbert, Ivan Tors
- Starring: Soupy Sales; Tab Hunter; Arthur O'Connell; Edward Andrews; Doris Dowling; Beverly Adams
- Production company: Ivan Tors Films
- Distributed by: Columbia Pictures
- Release date: August 1966
- Running time: 88 minutes
- Country: United States
- Language: English

Birds Do It is a 1966 American comedy film directed by Andrew Marton and starring Soupy Sales, Tab Hunter, Arthur O'Connell, Edward Andrews and Beverly Adams. It was made by Columbia Pictures and filmed at the Ivan Tors Studios in Miami.

== Plot ==
There are series of unsuccessful assassination attempts by an unknown organisation targeting Melvin Byrd. Byrd is a janitor in a NASA laboratory headed by Major General Smithburn with his security officer being an inept bungler, Lt. Porter. Porter is captured and impersonated by an enemy double from the same organization attempting to kill Byrd.

The head scientist Professor Waid has employed Byrd due to his excellent janitorial skills as Waid blames American space program failures on dust that caused disasters. Byrd parodies the Ajax "stronger than dirt" white knight commercial when cleaning the base.

Waid's secret project is developing an ionisation process initially to be tested on a chimpanzee that would make the subject capable of anti-gravity with a side effect that not only gives him the ability to fly, but makes him "the most attractive man" on Earth. When General Smithburn leads a Congressional delegation who are in Florida due to European junkets being cancelled, Byrd hides in the ionization machine, causing him to be ionized. In addition to losing the ability to stay on the ground for longer than brief periods, Byrd finds himself forced to fight off the attentions of a Congresswoman and Waid's daughter Claudine as well as the assassins.

== Cast ==
- Soupy Sales as Melvin Byrd
- Tab Hunter as Lt. Porter
- Arthur O'Connell as Prof. Wald
- Edward Andrews as Gen. Smithburn
- Doris Dowling as Congresswoman Clanger
- Beverly Adams as Claudine Wald
- Louis Quinn as Sgt. Shan
- Warren Day as Curtis

== Production ==
Producer Ivan Tors filmed Birds Do It at his Miami studios with cameos provided by Dean Martin (Columbia's Matt Helm), Flipper, director Andrew Marton as himself, and a Cary Grant impersonator played by Ray Anthony.

Sales was vocal in his dislike for the film, his only starring role. It was also the next-to-last film in Marton's long directing career.

In his memoirs Sales said the film "is now shown in six states as capital punishment." He claimed to have rejected the script at first "and I rejected it at first, because God knows you have to protect yourself in this business — people only blame who they see on screen, not the writers or directors." Then he added "once it was rewritten, Birds Do It wasn’t such a terrible picture."

The special effects of Byrd flying are in the style of the Hertz Rent-A-Car commercials of the time. One sequence featured Byrd being attacked by skydivers in a sequence reminiscent of the pre-credits sequence of Moonraker with Byrd's stunt double wearing a parachute under his sport coat.
