= The Filthiest Show in Town (film) =

Filthiest Show in Town
- Theatrical release poster
- Directed by: Richard Endelson; Robert A. Endelson
- Written by: Richard Endelson
- Starring: Sandra Peabody; Tina Russell; Harry Reems
- Release date: March 1, 1973
- Running time: 74 minutes
- Country: United States
- Language: English

The Filthiest Show in Town is a 1973 satirical exploitation comedy film directed by Richard Endelson and Robert A. Endelson. It stars Sandra Peabody, Tina Russell, and Harry Reems. The story follows the owners of the National Genital Television Network who go on trial over backlash of one of their highest rated shows: the adult dating show entitled The Maiden Game. The story follows several other vignettes in the form of disjointed commercial segments. Initially, the film was promoted by the extensive media coverage of adult film stars Russell and Reems, the latter having just starred in the mainstream adult film Deep Throat (1972). Subsequently, it was promoted by the notability of Peabody who had just starred in Wes Craven's critically acclaimed horror film The Last House on the Left (1972).

== Cast ==
- Sandra Peabody as Olga
- Tina Russell as Doris
- Harry Reems as Barney
- Marshall Anker as Bailiff
- Rudy Hornish as Bill Bangkok

== Reception ==
The film was met with generally negative reviews. In a 1974 review for The Province, film critic Michael Walsh stated, "A first film for a pair of would-be film entrepreneurs, New York's Endelson brothers, its only interesting feature is the fact that a number of American hardcore film veterans - performers like Tina Russel, Harry Reems and Dolly Sharp - appear in some mind-numbing, non-gymnastic roles. The filthiest show is The Maiden Game, afternoon entertainment from the National Genital Television network. A parody of TV's The Dating Game, it features nude "studs" and "maidens." Participants have names like Phyllis Phallus and come from places like Condom, Connecticut. The film actually does achieve the level of a poorly produced TV game show. In other words, it has absolutely nothing to recommend it."
