= Deranged (1987 film) =

- Australian video artwork
- Directed by: Chuck Vincent
- Written by: Craig Horrall
- Produced by: Chuck Vincent
- Starring: Veronica Hart; Jamie Gillis; Jerry Butler
- Cinematography: Chuck Vincent
- Edited by: James Davalos
- Music by: Bill Heller
- Production companies: Platinum Pictures, Inc.
- Release date: October 30, 1987
- Country: United States
- Language: English
- Budget: <$200,000.

Deranged is a 1987 American horror film directed by Chuck Vincent.

== Plot ==
Joyce has been suffering from schizophrenia ever since the death of her father. When Joyce is brutally attacked by a home invader, she kills the intruder by stabbing him with a pair of scissors. She later has a miscarriage as a result of the attack. As a result of her mental state, she does not call the police and instead stays isolated in her apartment, living on delivered food from and having visions of her therapist, her mother, and her father.

== Cast ==
- Veronica Hart as Joyce
- Jamie Gillis as Eugene
- Jerry Butler as Frank

== Production ==
Chuck Vincent had long developed the idea of doing a single set film with flashbacks and compared it structurally to a stage play. He also cited the Pornographic horror film Memories Within Miss Aggie by Gerard Damiano as an influence. Vincent shot the film in continuity over the course of five days following a three-day rehearsal. In order to avoid an X-rating, the MPAA required Vincent to cut out some violence and eliminate a scene in which an intimate couple in bed was in the same shot as a baby. Vincent acquiesced as he did not feel the cut content was especially important. Vincent was unaware there was previously a 1974 film with the same title, as the MPAA never told him. He was able to keep the title as the producers of the 1974 film never registered the title.

Veronica Hart was credited under her real name Jane Hamilton in the film.

== Release ==
Deranged had its premiere at the 1987 Cannes Film Festival on May 10, 1987. A release in the United States followed on October 30, 1987.

== Reception ==
Rob Winning, writing for Cinefantastique, praised the direction and ending, but called the acting "abysmal". Caryn James, in a review for The New York Times, gave the film a negative review, writing that "None of this is very suspenseful or convincing." Michael Weldon's The Psychotronic Video Guide described the film as "pretty unwatchable" and "one of those pretentious reality-vs-fantasy plots that allow the director to get away with all kinds of nonsense." The film has been compared to the 1980 rape and revenge film Demented.
