= Chuck Vincent (director) =

American pornographic film and B movie producer, screenwriter, editor and director

- Born: Charles Vincent Dingley; September 6, 1940; Michigan, U.S.
- Died: September 23, 1991 (aged 51); Key West, Florida, U.S.
- Occupation: Film director

Chuck Vincent (born Charles Vincent Dingley, September 6, 1940 – September 23, 1991) was an American pornographic film and B movie producer, screenwriter, editor and director.

== Career ==
Vincent was born on September 6, 1940, in Michigan. His father, Charles Dingley (Carmelo Dingli), was an immigrant from Rabat, Malta.

Vincent began his career in the 1960s in regional theater and Off-Broadway, doing work in a wide variety of behind-the-scenes jobs and positions for 12 years, including at theater companies such as the Negro Ensemble Company, where he was a set designer, and he also spent 5 years as a stage manager at the Tappan Zee Playhouse.

In 1970 he made his first short film, which he called The Appointment. He then moved on to doing feature-length softcore and hardcore pornography films. He was noted as one of the more sophisticated film makers in the industry. His most highly regarded work was his 1981 film Roommates, which received wide acclaim both in the porn industry and the mainstream press.

He also made Summer Camp (1979).

In the middle 1980s, Vincent moved away from hardcore to B movies. At one point he had a partnership with the Playboy Channel, where he produced content for their network. Preppies was the first film of the partnership. Vincent frequently cast Veronica Hart in major roles in his films. He also directed the 1987 fantasy film Warrior Queen, co-produced by Harry Alan Towers and Joe D'Amato, starring Sybil Danning and Donald Pleasence. In 1985, he had received a 10-picture agreement with Vestron Video, in which Vestron received key access to the titles, starting with the first project released under the 10-picture agreement, Sex Appeal.

Openly gay, Vincent died of AIDS complications on September 23, 1991. He was 51 years of age when he died, and he was living in Key West, Florida at the time of his death.

== Filmography ==
- Voices of Desire (1972)
- Blue Summer (1973)
- American Tickler (1977)
- Summer Camp (1979)
- Hot T-Shirts (1980)
- C.O.D. (1981)
- Roommates (1982)
- Preppies (1984)
- Hollywood Hot Tubs (1984)
- Sex Appeal (1986)
- Wimps (1986)
- If Looks Could Kill (1986)
- Warrior Queen (1987)
- Young Nurses in Love (1987)
- Slammer Girls (1987)
- Deranged (1987)
- Student Affairs (1987)
- Bad Blood (1988)
- Cleo/Leo (1989)
- Party Girls (1989)
- Bedroom Eyes II (1989)
- Enrapture (1989)
- Wildest Dreams (1990)

== Awards ==
- 1982 AFAA Award for Best Director for Roommates
- 1982 CFAA Award for Best Director for Roommates
- 1984 AVN Award for Best Screenplay - Film for Puss 'N Boots
- 1991 XRCO Hall of Fame Inductee
- 1993 Free Speech Coalition Lifetime Achievement Award - Director
