= South Broward High School =

Public high school in Hollywood, Florida, United States

Coordinates: 26.0298118°N 80.1422676°W

Location
- 1901 N Federal Hwy; Hollywood, Broward, Florida 33020; United States

Information
- Type: Public
- School board: School Board of Broward County
- School district: Broward County Public Schools
- Superintendent: Dr. Peter B. Licata
- Principal: Alexander Francois
- Teaching staff: 91.80 (FTE)
- Grades: 9–12
- Enrollment: 2,307 (2023-2024)
- Student to teacher ratio: 25.13
- Colors: Red and gold
- Mascot: Bulldog
- Accreditation: Cognia; Southern Association of Colleges and Schools
- Newspaper: The Bulldog Bark
- Yearbook: SBHS Browardier
- School hours: 7:00 a.m.–2:40 p.m.
- Website: southbroward.browardschools.com

South Broward High School (SBHS) is a marine science magnet school located in the Royal Poinciana neighborhood of Hollywood, Florida, United States. The school is a part of the Broward County Public Schools district.

South Broward High had a "High School Report Card" grade of a "B" for the 2021–2022 academic year.

== Overview ==
The site for the school was located approximately two miles north in the city of Dania Beach at the current site of Dania Beach Elementary School. It is the second oldest high school established in Broward County, after Fort Lauderdale High School. Dania High School, which had been a part of the Dania School founded in 1913 by the Dade County School Board, was renamed South Broward in 1938. Its name was appropriate considering that when Broward County was founded in 1915, it was effectively the only public school serving the southern half of the county. When a larger school was needed, the campus relocated to its present site at the corner of Federal Highway and Harding Street in 1949, and expanded northward not long after. After South Broward was integrated in 1966, it absorbed a significant number of the African American student body that had attended Attucks School (now the site of Attucks Middle School), which had served grades 7 through 12.

The school's athletic teams are known as the Bulldogs. The school offers a wide range of extracurricular and athletic activities.

It is one of the more ethnically and socioeconomically diverse high schools in Florida, providing an accurate demographic sample of the city of Hollywood as a whole.

== Demographics ==
As of the 2021–22 school year, the total student enrollment was 2,308. The ethnic makeup of the school was 62.3% White, 30.8% Black, 42.5% Hispanic, 2.1% Asian, 4.1% Multiracial, 0.5% Native American or Native Alaskan, and 0.1% Native Hawaiian or Pacific Islander.

== Notable alumni ==
- Marquise Brown - WR, Arizona Cardinals of the NFL
- Travis Burke - OT, Los Angeles Chargers of the National Football League
- Chris Bushing - former professional baseball player with the Cincinnati Reds
- Dominic Caristi - former SGA President, Professor Emeritus of Media, Ball State University; Fulbright Scholar.
- Travis Daniels - cornerback for the Cleveland Browns of the NFL
- Warren Day - former actor
- Janice Dickinson - first supermodel, TV celebrity
- Gary Farmer (Florida politician) - member of the Florida Senate since 2016
- Howard Finkelstein - chief public defender of Broward County
- Tucker Frederickson - former running back for the New York Giants of the NFL
- Bill Hawkins - former defensive lineman for the Los Angeles Rams of the NFL
- Josh James (baseball) - professional baseball player with the Houston Astros
- Tamara James - former WNBA player with the (Washington Mystics), Mayor of the City of Dania Beach
- Bobby Kent - murder victim; inspiration for the film Bully
- Danny McManus - former Florida State University professional American and Canadian football
- James "Big Jim" Nolan - Outlaws biker leader
- Rosie Ruiz - declared winner of the 84th Boston Marathon; later stripped of medal.
- Toccara Williams - former WNBA player with the San Antonio Silver Stars.
