= Iris Award (United States) =

American local TV programming award

The NATPE Iris Awards is an honor for local television programming presented annually in the United States by the National Association of Television Program Executives (NATPE). The awards were first introduced in 1968 and were initially titled the Program Excellence Awards. However, in 1977 the name was changed. The Iris Awards are the only national award meant to honor quality local television programming. From 1968 to 1997, the awards were presented at the annual NATPE Conference and Exhibition. After 1997, the awards were presented at a special ceremony in Los Angeles, California. NATPE’s Iris Awards were created to recognize executives, program producers, creators, talent, and importantly content that makes a significant impact on the industry and culture.

== See also ==
- List of American television awards
