= Film in Miami =

The film history has a long history in Miami and greater South Florida and continues to expands throughout Florida. Miami is one of the largest production and distribution centers in the world for the film, television, commercial advertising, still photo, music and new media industries. The industry's combined economic impact in the local economy is about two billion dollars annually, with $100 to $150 million coming from more than 1,000 location filming shoots each year. There are approximately 3,000 companies working in film and entertainment in Miami-Dade County, employing an estimated 15,000 workers.

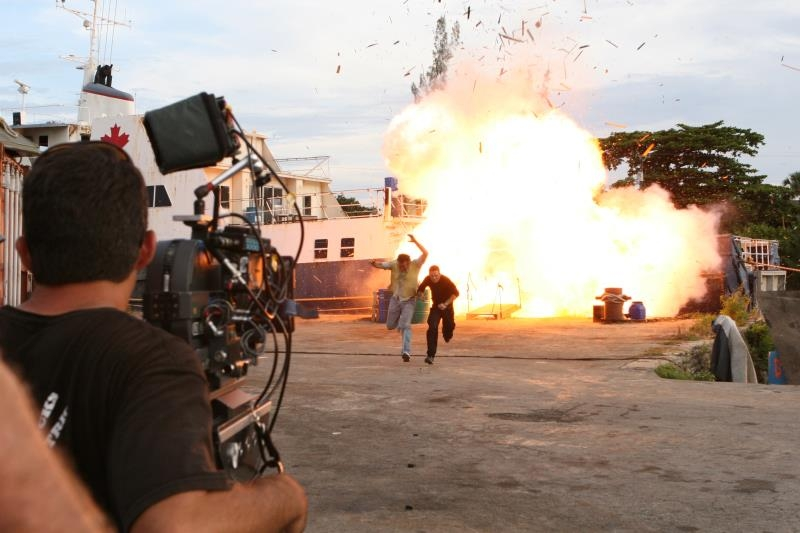
Burn Notice explosion On Set

== History ==
=== 1940s-1950s ===
Miami, Florida has had a booming film and entertainment industry since the 1940s and 1950s. Films such as Moon Over Miami, A Hole in the Head, Key Largo, and 30 Seconds Over Tokyo capitalized on the tropical locations that the city and surrounding area offers. Max Fleischer produced his Betty Boop, Popeye, and Superman cartoons as well as the features Gulliver's Travels and Mr. Bug Goes to Town from animation studios on the Miami River from 1938 to 1942. Fleischer invented the rotoscope, which allowed him to make animations from live action film scenes, and the Fleischer Studios capitalized on its animation process to rival Walt Disney as a top animation studio of the period.

=== 1960s ===
During the 1960s films and television series concentrated on Miami's "fun in the sun" vacation image. Miami was portrayed as a paradise where everyone has fun. Films made during the 1960s include Clambake, The Bellboy, and Where the Boys Are.

Miami based television shows include the Jackie Gleason Show, Flipper, and Gentle Ben. The Jackie Gleason Show brought attention to Miami because Gleason often spoke about Miami's great weather and beauty. Gleason, moved his show to Miami Beach so he could play golf year round.

To facilitate the filming of TV shows and movies, the film and entertainment industry built infrastructure in South Florida and built studios, film labs, and camera rental facilities in Miami. The show Flipper was filmed at Ivan Tors Studios, which subsequently became Greenwich Studios and is still in operation today. Ivan Tors, Continental Film Labs, and the Cinetech camera rental house became mainstays of the industry. The '60s helped establish Miami as a legitimate location for new media with proper facilities and a talented pool of workers.

=== 1970s-1980s ===
The 1970s and 1980s films reflected the decline of the Miami dream. Famous movies such as Scarface, Lenny, Deep Throat, Body Heat, Black Sunday, and Godfather II focused on corruption, sex and violence. During the 1980s, Miami had a negative image despite its naturally beautiful environment. The Mariel boatlift cast thousands of unemployed Cuban immigrants into the city, among them many criminals. The city suffered racial tension and the infamous Liberty City riots. The drug culture was rampant and "Cocaine Cowboy" violence spread.

Miami Vice, one of the most famous Miami based television shows, premiered in 1984. It was produced by Michael Mann based on creator Anthony Yerkovich's idea of "MTV cops." Miami Vice both amplified the area's negative image and helped redefine Miami as a city. Viewers saw the beautiful landscapes and buildings and fell in love with the look. The show was filmed in stereophonic sound with many popular songs from the 1980s which helped create an atmosphere that romanticized Miami. Viewers saw Miami as America's Casablanca – alluring, exotic and a little dangerous. Miami Vice is credited with creating a boom in tourism, its viewers wanting a firsthand experience of the city. Miami Beach was completely revitalized by the show into a world class destination and a vacation hot spot. In addition, the show's five-year run helped build an even larger base of first rate production technicians and facilities in Miami.

=== 1990s ===
Miami in the 1990s became one of the most popular still photography locations in the world, in part due to the notoriety it gained from the Miami Vice experience. Bruce Weber, Helmut Newton, Annie Leibovitz, and virtually every other world class photographer shot projects in the area during the 1990s. The Ford and Elite Agencies populated the beaches and nightclubs of the emerging South Beach district with beautiful models, and thousands of fashion and photo shoots began taking advantage of the tropical art deco backdrops and amazing light Miami had to offer.

Commercial advertising production also became more popular in Miami during the '90s, capitalizing on the weather advantages during winter months, and on the local production infrastructure with first class crews.

Movies shot in Miami during the decade included Ace Ventura: Pet Detective, True Lies, There's Something About Mary, The Birdcage, Out of Sight, Wild Things, Striptease, Donnie Brasco, Bad Boys and Drop Zone. The profusion of films produced in Miami during the decade represented a significant increase the number A-list directors and stars associated with them, all hoping to capture some of the city's glamorous appeal in their productions. Miami became a first tier destination for Hollywood filmmakers and television producers in the 1990s.

== Spanish Language Influence ==
Since the mid-1990s, South Florida has also become a hotbed for the Spanish-language television industry. Telemundo, Univision, Venevision and dozens of international cable networks began producing programs aimed at Latin America and the growing U.S. Hispanic population. The Spanish language music industry is also a prominent business in the Miami area. Sony, EMI, BMG, and other music labels are represented. As a huge international metropolis with close proximity to Latin America and a large Hispanic population, Miami is culturally attuned to the growth opportunities in Spanish-language media. The Hispanic population is now the largest minority group in the United States. Spanish language entertainment is one of the fastest growing media sectors. In 2005, Telenovela production alone spent nearly $30 million in Miami-Dade County. It appears that in the coming years, Miami will continue to be the headquarters for Latin music and Spanish-language television in the U.S.

== Miami-Dade County Office of Film and Entertainment ==
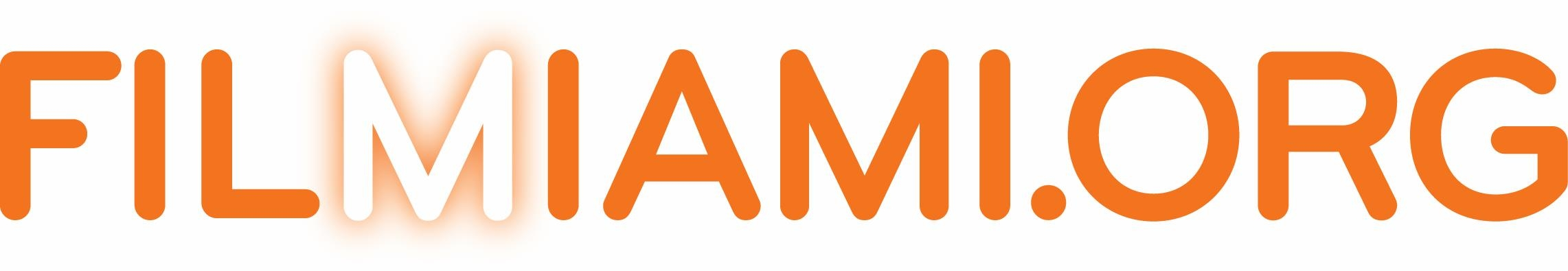
Filmiami Logo

The Miami-Dade County Office of Film and Entertainment (Filmiami) offers location and logistics assistance, government liaison, production information and referral sources to the film, television and photo production industry. It began in 1977.

== Films and television shows filmed in Miami ==
Some of the major feature films filmed in Miami include: The Birdcage, True Lies, Bad Boys, Bad Boys for Life, Miami Vice, 2 Fast 2 Furious, Lenny, Scarface, Ali (film), Red Eye, Marley and Me, Analyze This, Married to the Mob, Any Given Sunday, Wild Things, Striptease, Caddyshack, Drop Zone, Jaws 2, Goldfinger, Black Sunday, Day of the Dolphin, Deep Throat, The Godfather Part II, Just Cause, The Specialist, Out of Time, Police Academy 5: Assignment Miami Beach, Porky's Revenge, Body Heat, The Bellboy, Clambake, Absence of Malice, The Mean Season, Where The Boys Are, There's Something About Mary, Out of Sight, Pain and Gain and Donnie Brasco.

US television shows filmed in Miami include: Miami Vice, Burn Notice, MTV's Video Music Awards, South Beach, Miami Animal Cops, Dexter, Miami Ink, The Kardashians, Nip/Tuck, Gentle Ben, Flipper, Jackie Gleason Show, The Real World, Road Rules, and Latin Grammys.
