= Marilyn Burns =

American actress (1949–2014)

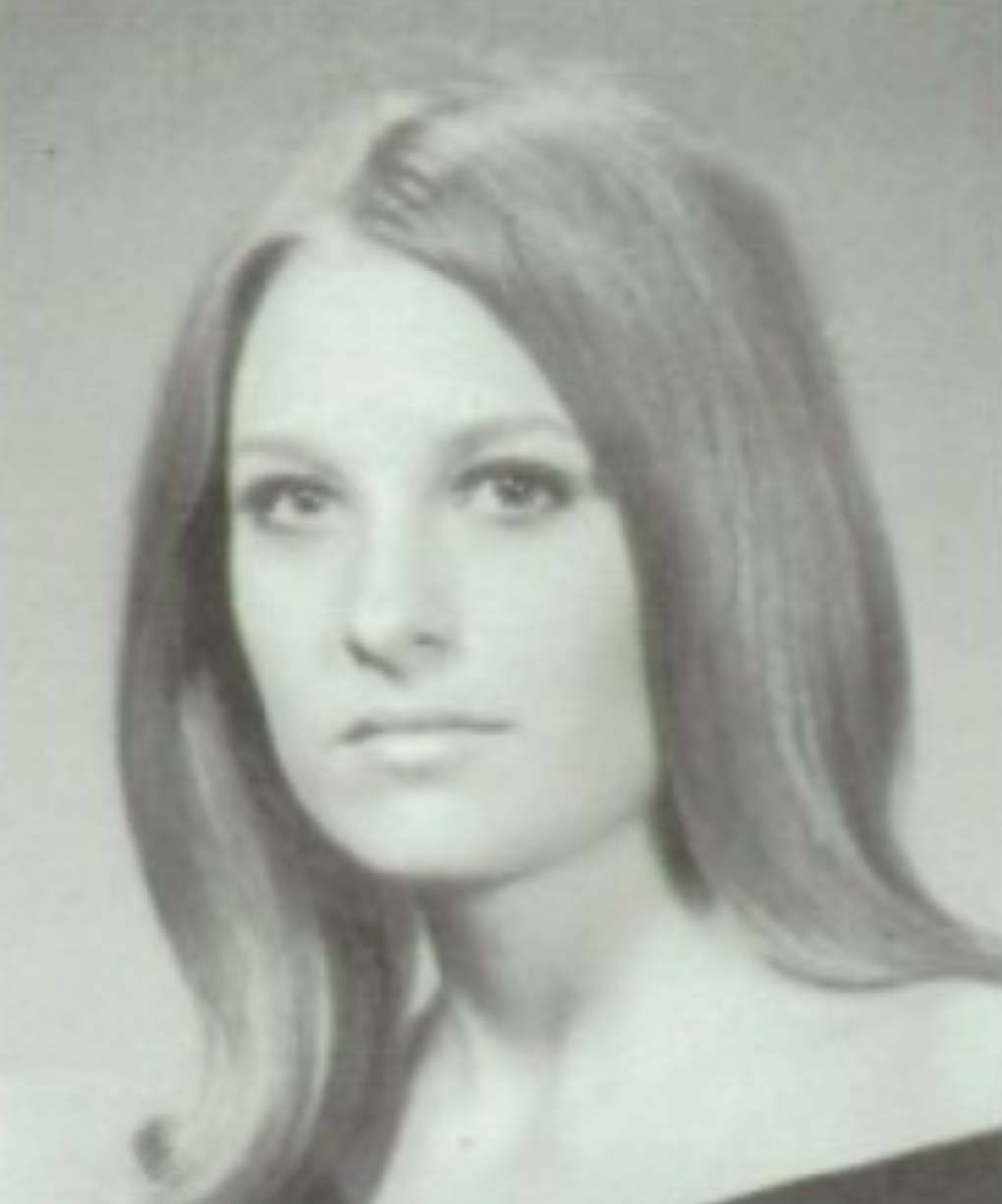
- Burns in 1967
- Born: Mary Lynn Ann Burns; May 7, 1949; Erie, Pennsylvania, U.S.
- Died: August 5, 2014 (aged 65); Houston, Texas, U.S.
- Education: University of Texas at Austin (BA)
- Occupation: Actress
- Years active: 1970–2014

Marilyn Burns (born Mary Lynn Ann Burns; May 7, 1949 – August 5, 2014) was an American actress. Burns is known for portraying survivor Sally Hardesty in Tobe Hooper's influential horror film The Texas Chain Saw Massacre (1974), which established her as an early final girl and scream queen. In 2025, the film was her first to be inducted into the National Film Registry by the Library of Congress.

While in college, Burns made her film debut in Robert Altman's comedy Brewster McCloud (1970). She played Linda Kasabian in the true crime television film Helter Skelter, and starred in Hooper's horror film Eaten Alive (both 1976) and the science fiction film Future-Kill (1985), the latter of which was written by her Texas Chain Saw Massacre co-star Edwin Neal. She then appeared in two more Texas Chainsaw films, making a cameo as Sally in The Return of the Texas Chainsaw Massacre (1995) and playing a different character in Texas Chainsaw 3D (2013).

In 2009, Burns was inducted into the Horror Hall of Fame at the Phoenix Film Festival. On August 5, 2014, she was found dead in her home. A few of her short films were released posthumously.

== Life and career ==
=== Early years and education ===
Mary Lynn Ann Burns was born on May 7, 1949 in Erie, Pennsylvania, and was raised in Houston, Texas, where she resided for most of her life. While in the seventh grade, she appeared in a musical production of A Midsummer Night's Dream. She attended the University of Texas at Austin, and graduated with a drama degree in 1971.

=== Acting career ===
In 1970, she made her first film appearance in Robert Altman's comedy film Brewster McCloud (1970). Burns was cast in the leading role of the drama film Lovin' Molly (1974)—having received the script and been costumed. However, for the established actors Anthony Perkins, Blythe Danner and Beau Bridges to appear, they wanted newcomer Susan Sarandon to be cast in the role instead. Burns got to remain a part of the production as a stand-in for Blythe and Sarandon. She also helped cast some of the extras in George Roy Hill's period drama The Great Waldo Pepper (1975).

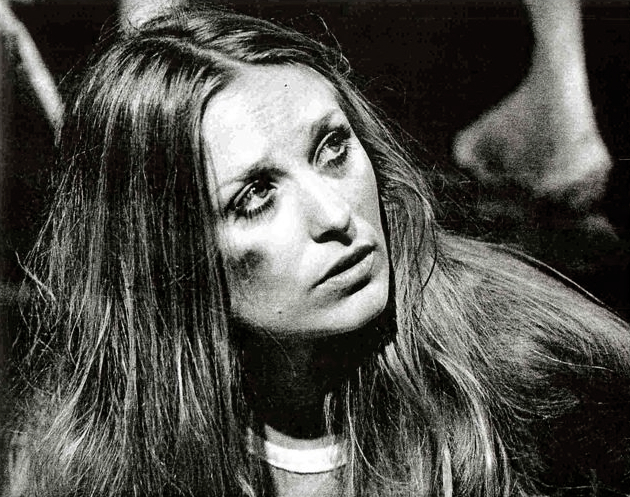
Burns filming The Texas Chain Saw Massacre (1974)

In 1974, Burns starred in Tobe Hooper's independent horror film The Texas Chain Saw Massacre. She plays the character of Sally Hardesty, a teenager who travels with her brother and some friends to the cemetery where her grandfather is buried to investigate reports of grave vandalism, and then encounters a family of cannibals including the chainsaw-wielding Leatherface.

Burns and Hooper had previously met during the production of Lovin' Molly the previous year. When a casting call was held, she auditioned and was given the lead role. The film was produced with a budget of $80,000–$140,000. Burns had performed several of her stunts herself, and she, along with other cast members, had sustained several injuries throughout production. In an article for Texas Monthly detailing the production of the film, John Bloom reported that Burns had "been poked, prodded, bound, dragged through rooms, jerked around, chased through cocklebur underbrush, jabbed with a stick, forced to skid on her knees in take after take, pounded on the head with a rubber hammer, coated with sticky stage blood, and endlessly pursued by Hansen with his chain saw and Neal with his constantly flicking switchblade."

The Texas Chain Saw Massacre was released to major critical and commercial success. The film grossed an excess of $30 million and became the 12th highest-grossing film of its year, and was the most successful independent feature until it was overtaken by Halloween in 1978. Donald B. Berrigan of The Cincinnati Enquirer praised the actress, saying: "Marilyn Burns, as Sally, deserves a special Academy Award for one of the most sustained and believable acting achievements in movie history." Screen Rant ranked Burns's performance first on their list of the "10 Greatest Female Performances in Horror Film History", writing that she "is so convincing in her work as the mentally broken Sally that the audience can’t help but be left shaken and deeply disturbed by the time the end credits roll." The acting of Burns has continued to earn praise from critics and audiences, and established her as a scream queen and a popular culture icon.

In 1976, Burns had a role in the television miniseries Helter Skelter about the real-life trial of Charles Manson and his "family". In the series, she played Linda Kasabian, a member of the Manson family who was granted immunity in exchange for her testimony against the defendants. Recalling her memories of working on Helter Skelter, Burns said: "It was a great experience, but nobody really wanted to touch it [due to the subject matter]. It was like, 'Who wants to be in that picture? Who's actually gonna do that picture?'" The miniseries was acclaimed and nominated for three Emmy Awards.

Following her roles in The Texas Chain Saw Massacre and Helter Skelter, Burns sporadically worked in acting. She played Faye in the horror film Eaten Alive (1977), where she reunited with director Tobe Hooper, and subsequently starred in the films Kiss Daddy Goodbye (1981) and Future-Kill (1985).

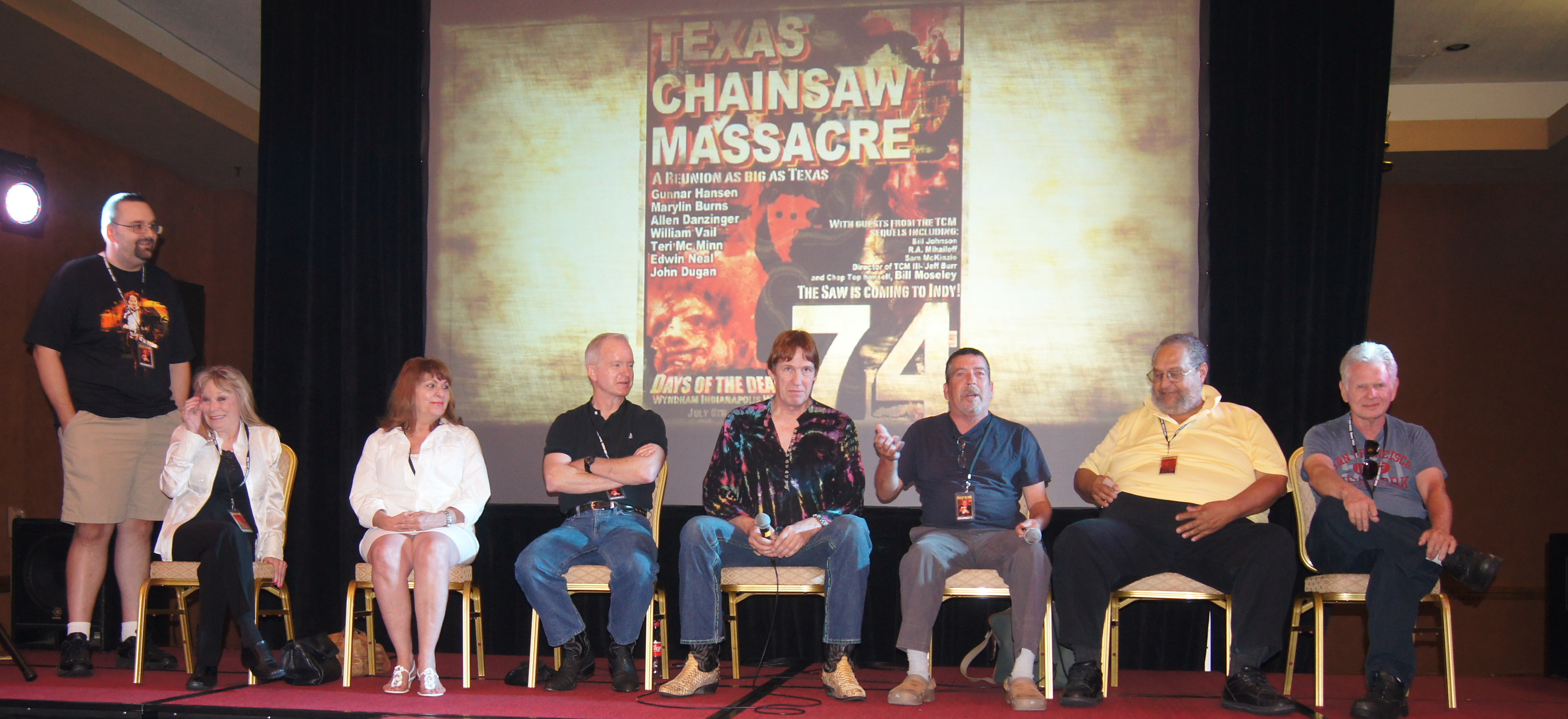
The cast of The Texas Chain Saw Massacre at a reunion event in 2012; Burns is second from the left.

Burns briefly reprises the role of Sally Hardesty in The Return of the Texas Chainsaw Massacre (1995), which was directed by Kim Henkel. Her cameo was made in order to establish "an emotional connection between the Sally character and the Jenny character, a kind of perverse passing of the torch". She was set to reprise the role of Sally Hardesty once more in the 2003 remake film of the same name, where she would play an aged-up Sally, however this idea was ultimately scrapped. At the 2009 Phoenix Film Festival, Burns was inducted into the Horror Hall of Fame.

In 2012, Burns made a special appearance in the Kim Henkel-written feature Butcher Boys, which is often deemed a "spiritual sequel" to The Texas Chain Saw Massacre. In 2011, Burns was cast in the slasher film Texas Chainsaw 3D as Verna Carson; it was released on January 4, 2013, and marks her last appearance in The Texas Chainsaw Massacre franchise. Her final film roles include Beulah Standifier in 2014's Sacrament, and Ms. Hill in the independent feature In a Madman's World, which was released posthumously in 2017.

=== Death ===
On August 5, 2014, at the age of 65, Burns was found dead by her brother Bill at her home in Houston. Her cause of death was not specified.

== Filmography ==
=== Film ===
| Year | Title | Role | Notes |
|---|---|---|---|
| 1970 | Brewster McCloud | Tour Guide | Uncredited |
| 1974 | The Texas Chain Saw Massacre | Sally | |
| 1976 | Eaten Alive | Faye | |
| 1981 | Kiss Daddy Goodbye | Nora Dennis | |
| 1984 | Terror in the Aisles | Sally Hardesty | Documentary; archive footage |
| 1985 | Future-Kill | Dorothy Grim | |
| 1995 | The Return of the Texas Chainsaw Massacre | Patient on Gurney | Credited as "Anonymous" |
| 2012 | Butcher Boys | Ruth | |
| 2013 | Texas Chainsaw 3D | Verna Carson | Also features archive footage as Sally Hardesty |
| 2014 | Sacrament | Beulah Standifer | |
| 2017 | In a Madman's World | Mrs. Hill | Posthumous release |

=== Television ===
| Year | Title | Role | Notes |
|---|---|---|---|
| 1976 | Helter Skelter | Linda Kasabian | Main role |
| 1998 | Michael Hayes | Sally | Episode: "Under Color of Law" |

== Accolades ==
| Year | Award | Category | Work | Result |
|---|---|---|---|---|
| 2009 | Phoenix Film Festival | International Horror & Sci-Fi Hall of Fame | Herself | Won |
