= Jamie Lloyd (Halloween) =

Fictional character

- Halloween character
- Danielle Harris as Jamie Lloyd in the fourth film
- First appearance: Halloween 4: The Return of Michael Myers (1988)
- Last appearance: Halloween: The Curse of Michael Myers (1995)
- Created by: Alan B. McElroy
- Portrayed by: Danielle Harris (4-5 [physical], and 6 [archive footage for The Curse of Michael Myers]); J. C. Brandy (The Curse of Michael Myers)

In-universe information
- Family: Laurie Strode (deceased mother); Unnamed Father (unknown)
- Children: Stephen Lloyd (son/cousin in Producer's Cut)
- Relatives: Judith Myers (deceased maternal aunt); Michael Myers (maternal uncle); Pamela Strode (deceased maternal grandmother); Richard Carruthers (foster father); Darlene Carruthers (foster mother); Rachel Carruthers (deceased foster sister); John Strode (deceased maternal great-uncle); Debra Strode (deceased maternal great-aunt); Tim Strode (deceased maternal first cousin once removed); Kara Strode (maternal first cousin once removed); Danny Strode (maternal second cousin)
- Status: Deceased

Jamie Lloyd is a fictional character and one of the main protagonists of the Halloween franchise. Introduced in Halloween 4: The Return of Michael Myers as the series' new protagonist after Jamie Lee Curtis declined to return as Laurie Strode, the character also appears in Halloween 5: The Revenge of Michael Myers and Halloween: The Curse of Michael Myers. Jamie was created by Alan B. McElroy and portrayed by child actress Danielle Harris in the fourth and fifth films of the series, and J.C. Brandy in the sixth film of the series; Harris additionally appears in uncredited archive footage for the latter film. Originally, the character was named Brittany "Britti" Lloyd, before her name was changed to Jamie, in an homage to Jamie Lee Curtis.

In the films, Jamie is the daughter of Laurie Strode, who died off-screen in a car crash in the time between Halloween II and 4. As such, she is also the niece of the series' main antagonist, Michael Myers, and becomes her uncle's new primary target after he learns about Laurie's death. Michael eventually succeeds in killing Jamie at age 15 in The Curse of Michael Myers, though not before she gives birth to a baby son, who becomes Michael's next target.

== Appearances ==
=== Films ===
Jamie is introduced in Halloween 4: The Return of Michael Myers (1988) as Laurie Strode's daughter and Michael Myers' niece. Her mother is described to have died in a car crash at some point before 1988; the identity of her father is not revealed. Following Laurie's death, Jamie was adopted by the Carruthers family and develops a close bond with her older foster sister, Rachel (Ellie Cornell). Jamie suffers from nightmares about Michael and is bullied at school for being related to "The Boogeyman". On October 30, 1988, Michael (George P. Wilbur) recovers from his ten-year coma while being transported in an ambulance, and escapes to hunt down his relatives. In Haddonfield, while on the trail for Jamie, Michael kills the Carruthers' dog, a worker at the power plant (which causes a blackout of the entire town), most of the police force, including a deputy, the police chief's daughter Kelly, Rachel's boyfriend Brady, and 4 men from a vigilante mob. Escaping from town, Jamie cowers in a pick-up truck as Rachel hits Michael head on, throwing him off the truck and knocking him out. Despite Rachel's orders, Jamie goes over to him and holds his hand. When the police arrive, they tell Jamie to drop to the ground and open fire on Michael, sending him to fall down a mine shaft, which then collapses on top of him. Later, back in her foster home, Jamie is apparently possessed by Michael's spirit and attacks her foster mother (Karen Alston). When screams are heard from upstairs, Dr. Samuel Loomis (Donald Pleasence) goes to investigate and finds Jamie wearing a clown costume and holding a pair of bloody scissors, similarly to Michael when he killed his older sister Judith. Sheriff Ben Meeker (Beau Starr) restrains Loomis from shooting her, and both men, Jamie's foster father (Jeff Olson), and Rachel watch in horror, realizing that Jamie is following in Michael's footsteps.

In Halloween 5: The Revenge of Michael Myers (1989), set a year later, a severely traumatized Jamie is housed in the Haddonfield Children's Clinic. She has now been rendered mute and suffers from nightmares and seizures, while being treated for attacking her foster mother (who is described to have survived) under Michael's influence. When a still-living Michael (Donald L. Shanks) awakens from a year-long coma, she exhibits signs of a telepathic link with her uncle, eventually regains the ability to speak, and has seizures whenever her uncle kills someone. Michael kills Rachel, four of her friends, two cops, and the Carruthers' new dog while in pursuit of Jamie. Towards the end, Loomis lures Michael into a trap at the old Myers house, using Jamie as bait. Michael finds Jamie, who tries to appeal to his humanity. At her request, he takes off his mask, but is sent into a fit of rage when Jamie touches his face. Ultimately, Loomis is able to shoot Michael with tranquilizer darts and beat him unconscious with a wooden beam. Michael is subsequently imprisoned at the local jail, awaiting transport to a maximum-security facility, where, Meeker says, he will remain "until the day he dies," to which Jamie responds, "He'll never die." After Jamie is escorted out to be taken home, the mysterious "Man in Black" attacks the police station and frees Michael. Jamie enters to see numerous police officers dead and Michael gone, causing her to sob in terror.

In Halloween: The Curse of Michael Myers (1995), a deleted scene included in the Producer's Cut shows the Man in Black kidnapping Jamie (presented as a combination of Harris via footage from the previous film and a similarly aged body double in a new back shot) immediately after breaking Michael (George P. Wilbur) out of jail, and keeping her captive for six years, during which time she is artificially inseminated and impregnated with Michael's son. On the night of October 30, 1995, Jamie gives birth and escapes with the help of a sympathetic nurse, but is pursued by Michael. She escapes to a nearby bus depot, where she pleads for help on Barry Simms's radio show (which is heard by Loomis and an adult Tommy Doyle (now played by Paul Rudd) and hides her baby, before being forced to flee when Michael finds her. She eventually crashes the truck she is driving at a barn, where Michael confronts and murders her. The Man in Black is later revealed to be Loomis' former medical colleague Dr. Terence Wynn (now played by Mitchell Ryan), who is the leader of a Druid-like cult. It is implied that the cult is responsible for Michael's actions, placing an ancient curse on him to kill his family to ward off sickness and death. It is also implied that Wynn has been trying and failing to breed the ultimate evil using Michael's DNA and female patients in in-vitro fertilization experiments; finally reaching a success with Jamie's baby. In another deleted scene included in the Producer's Cut, Jamie survives Michael's attack and is hospitalized. Loomis and Wynn visit her in the hospital, but she is later killed with a silenced pistol by the Man in Black (later revealed to be Wynn).

=== Literature ===
Jamie Lloyd's first literary appearance was in October 1988, in Nicholas Grabowsky's novelization of Halloween 4. The official Halloween: 30 Years of Terror comic book, taking place in the new continuity, has an adult Tommy Doyle illustrating comic books. Various elements from the fourth through sixth movies can be seen on his books, one of which is Jamie. The cancelled comic Halloween: The Mark of Thorn was to feature Jamie, as well as Tommy Doyle, Rachel Carruthers and the Man in Black.

=== Merchandise ===
In 2019, Trick Or Treat Studios released clown costumes based on Jamie's costume in Halloween 4. She is also featured in the first series of the Halloween 4: The Return of Michael Myers Wall Decor Collection.

== Concept and creation ==
=== Characterization ===
Patrick Bromley observed that incorporating children into horror franchise sequels "is usually the kiss of death" but that Jamie's inclusion in Halloween 4 revitalized the series. According to Bromley, "Jamie has been dealt a difficult hand by life: orphaned at a young age, Jamie feels like an outcast at school" while wanting to fit in and have normalcy, Bromley crediting the performance by Harris with evoking "the character's innate sadness without turning Jamie into a mope." Megan Summers of Ranker calls Jamie "the emotional core" of Halloween 4 and that "Jamie tries her best to defend herself as Michael closes in on her" despite her age and background. In his ranking of the final girls in the Halloween franchise, Jake Dee observed that Jamie “overcomes her past trauma and schoolyard bullying for being related to Michael Myers, only to have her homicidal uncle stalk her mercilessly and relentlessly”. Dee notes the character overcoming her uncle's mental hold on her and “her own sense of evil” and cites this as making her one of Michael's strongest opponents. Princess Weekes of The Mary Sue writes that Jamie works as an effective protagonist due to the performance of Harris and "the fact that she as a child was being thrust into these terrible situations." Weekes views Jamie as a foil to Michael who reminds the audience of "the fragility of childhood and how easy it is for a child to be warped into becoming something they are not" and asserts that Jamie could have become like Michael if she did not have a support group who helped her. David Crow of Den of Geek cites Jamie, as she is portrayed in Halloween 4 and Halloween 5, as an “especially rare type of final girl” due to being a child and complimented Harris as doing “pretty well for a child actress in this role, particularly in her second entry where her pantomime expressions (the terror of the fourth movie left her mute) allow her instant sympathy—a trait long lost in most horror movie heroines.”

A.A. Dowd of The A.V. Club writes that Jamie and Rachel split the heroine role previously held by Laurie Strode as the pair of sisters "are stalked by Myers, who in turn is hunted by both a scarred, limping Loomis and a mob of trigger-happy hillbillies." Little said that Jamie and Rachel had the "universal fear" of being "in a group of people and then suddenly, you are completely alone, isolated and scared." He recounted wanting to explore this feeling with the scene in Halloween 4 in which Jamie and Rachel are separated while trick-or-treating and this fear was "not just unique to Jamie because she’s a small child." "At the inception of the film, the innocence and vulnerability of Jamie contrasted with the stern and nonchalant demeanor of Rachel," Rodoflo Salas wrote. Salas explained that the relationship progresses after Rachel recognizes "her selfishness was steamrolling over Jamie" and tries to bring her joy during Halloween ahead of Michael encountering the pair: "Once Michael Myers arrived, Rachel took charge and fought back against Jamie's psychotic uncle on rooftops, schoolyards, and streets. She pulled out all the stops to save her sister." Chris Sasaguay wrote that Jamie demonstrated forced maturity when she commanded herself to stop crying before Rachel could see her and insisted that the sibling bond between Jamie and Rachel causes the latter to "is what makes the suspense scenes reach such a high level of anxiety."

Commentary is directed toward Jamie's role in the ending of Halloween 4. Reviewing the film upon its release, The New York Times opined that the ending promised "a sequel with a feminist twist." Spencer Whitworth writes that although it appears Michael has finally been vanquished, his wickedness "has survived, and it has passed to his innocent niece" and that "Jamie stands as an emotionless dead ringer of her uncle". Whitworth furthers that "Jamie's transformation and Loomis' despair is a darker final note" than any of the Halloween films that came before or since have ended on. Summers views Jamie's attack on her stepmother as a reenactment of her uncle's "original sin" and that it provokes "questions about familial cycles of cruelty and whether or not - even if his niece didn't perish - Michael achieved his goal by pushing Jamie over the edge." Devin Meenan of Comic Book Resources notes that Jamie's attack on her adoptive mother mirrors Michael's attack of Judith in the opening scene of the original Halloween due to both her clown costume resembling his and the point-of-view shot through her mask and that the conclusion showed "Michael is victorious even in death, for his evil has infected his family."

Dominique Othenin-Girard said he wanted Jamie to have the chance to redeem herself after stabbing her stepmother. Girard believed removing Jamie's speaking ability would give her "a heavy punishment and a difficulty she had to overcome" in her journey to evolving into a hero. He mentioned that Jamie's visions of Michael were the first part of Halloween 5 to be written and how this element of the traumatized Jamie would play into the main plot of the film. Girard explained, "I gave her the ability to sense the activity of Michael, I wished for her to see what Michael sees when he gets furious. That was the tool for the character to 'help' out the hunt for Michael Myers." Jason Barr notes Halloween 4, Halloween 5, Friday the 13th Part VII: The New Blood, and A Nightmare on Elm Street 5: The Dream Child as being slasher films of the late 1980s that "feature a Final Girl with telekinetic or psychic powers". Barr observes that Jamie "has a psychic bond with Michael Myers that slowly drives her insane" and notices a pattern of the female character in each instance being directly responsible for other characters being murdered, citing Jamie as refusing "to help the increasingly unbalanced Dr. Loomis in Halloween V, which directly results in several deaths, including several of Jamie’s friends." Barr explains that Jamie rejects "masculine gendered role as the Final Girl for much of the film" and that once Jamie makes the decision to assist Dr. Loomis, "she both accepts her Final Girl status while also agreeing to use her feminized powers of empathy."

Eric Browning writes that during Halloween 5, Tina becomes Jamie's "primary caregiver" in the absence of Rachel and "cares more about Jamie than physical intimacy with her boyfriend". Daily Grind House observes that Rachel's death receives backlash "because it paves the way for Tina to be our lead alongside Jamie, and Tina is often referred to as an annoying personality, which I disagree with because while she’s a bit much – very brash indeed, she’s also deeply sympathetic and protective to Jamie which I find to be heartening." Mark Ziobro opined that Jamie's connection with Tina and the performance of Harris are the best parts of Halloween 5, citing some of their scenes as adding "to the film in unique ways. They save the film from complete obscurity and garner a good amount of sympathy for their characters."

Jamie has drawn comparisons to Tommy Jarvis from the Friday the 13th franchise as both are child characters introduced in the fourth installment of their respective series who defeat the killer and are also "foreshadowed to become the killer themselves" before appearing in a trilogy of movies.

=== Development ===
Halloween II was supposed to be the last film in the Halloween franchise to revolve around Michael Myers. After the 1982 release of Halloween III: Season of the Witch, the lowest performing film in the series at the time, executive producer Moustapha Akkad wanted to make a sequel that brought back Michael Myers. On February 25, 1988, writer Alan B. McElroy, a Cleveland, Ohio native, was brought in to the write the script for Halloween 4. The writer's strike was to begin on March 7 that year. This forced McElroy to develop a concept, pitch the story, and send in the final draft in under eleven days. McElroy came up with the idea of Brittany "Britti" Lloyd, Laurie Strode's daughter, to be chased by her uncle, who has escaped from Ridgemont after being in a coma for ten years. The setting of the place was once again Haddonfield, Illinois. The character of Laurie Strode was revealed to have died, leaving Britti with the Carruthers family, which included Rachel, the family's seventeen-year-old daughter. Britti's name was later changed to Jamie, a homage to Laurie Strode actress Jamie Lee Curtis.

The ending of Halloween 4 features Jamie stabbing her foster mother as she seemingly inherits the evil of her uncle. Little and McElroy did not return for the sequel. Little later said the duo would have furthered developed the relationship between Jamie and Rachel: "What we would have done was to work on the relationship between the sisters – between Danielle and Ellie – as I do think that was the core of the movie then. We clearly would’ve gone in a very different way, but it really wasn’t up to me to decide at that point because I didn’t have time to participate." The first draft of the screenplay for Halloween 5 was written by Shem Bitterman. Bitterman's screenplay was written to have Jamie Lloyd becoming evil after stabbing her foster mother in Halloween 4. This idea was rejected by the studio and Akkad, who brought in Michael Jacobs to re-write the script. After reviewing the screenplay, director Othenin-Girard added Jamie's inability to speak to the draft, along with the supernatural plot device of her telepathic visions connected to Michael. Othenin-Girard planned for Jamie to be stabbed in the leg by Michael while she was in a laundry shoot so that her escape would seem "almost impossible" to audiences. He believed that a young girl being stabbed "in the extreme confinement of a very dark chute is sooo mean and sooo unfair. I took great care not to shoot it in a gory way, there was no blood splurging out of the leg, just the knife entering the flesh. Just a very short hit which was supposed to hurt and scandalize an audience." In the original closing scene of Halloween 5, after Jamie finds that Michael has escaped from the police station, she is approached by a black-cloaked figure, who is in fact Dr. Terrence Wynn, the head of Smith's Grove Sanitarium, where Michael had been remanded as a child.

Although the producers at the time had already sought to make a sixth Halloween film, a series of complicated legal battles ensued which delayed plans for a sequel; eventually Miramax Films (via its Dimension Films division) bought the rights to the Halloween series. Phil Rosenberg was the first writer hired for the film. His script, titled Halloween 666: The Origin, was hated by Akkad, who tossed the script across his room after he finished reading it. The script mentions Jamie as having disappeared and she has a brief appearance "in the form of a series of rapid shots during the Samhain/virtual reality segment: Surrounded by scattering rats, Jamie screams as she is trapped in a cage made of human bones." In June 1994, Farrands was hired to write a new screenplay, as the film had an impending shooting date scheduled for October in Salt Lake City, Utah. Farrands has said his initial intent for the film was to "bridge the later films (4–5) in the series to the earlier films (1–2) while at the same time taking the story into new territory so that the series could expand for future installments."

Akkad told Farrands that while he liked the script, he felt it was too long and needed to be cut in half with the first half serving as the basis for the sixth film. The script by Farrands featured a secret society "made up of a lot of the people within the town of Haddonfield" who wanted to take Jamie's life as a final sacrifice. The film concludes with Jamie about to be murdered by Michael and a mob when "all of a sudden out of this crowd appears a dark figure. It turns out to be Laurie, and she’s there to save her daughter." Citing her as "a big star", Akkad doubted that Jamie Lee Curtis would ever come back to the series and told Farrands to come up with another idea; Farrands believed that "Jamie Lee Curtis with Danielle Harris would have been such a cool way to bring the whole thing full circle. That would have been a nice way to connect all the dots." Farrands expanded the "Curse of Thorn" plot line, in which Jamie Lloyd is kidnapped by a covert cult who has cursed Michael Myers via the Runic symbol of Thorn, which compels him to kill and also affords him immortality. While the character of Jamie Lloyd dies early in the film, the initial versions of Farrands' script had her character surviving until the final act, at which point she was ultimately killed by Michael.

When screenwriter Kevin Williamson first outlined Halloween H20: 20 Years Later (1998), he created the storyline in which Laurie Strode has faked her own death and taken on a new identity as a specific way of retconning the character's death in Halloween 4. In Williamson's original treatment, there are scenes in which a Hillcrest student does a report on Michael Myers' killing spree, mentioning the death of Jamie, complete with flashbacks to 4-6 mentioned in the text. "Keri"/Laurie responds to hearing the student's report on the death of her daughter by going into a restroom and throwing up. In a controversial decision, director Steve Miner retconned the series with Halloween H20: 20 Years Later. This installment retained Laurie's faked death from Williamson's treatment, revealing that she did so in order to avoid detection by her relentless brother. Under a new identity, Laurie has fled to Summer Glen, California, along with her only son, John Tate (Josh Hartnett). However, to focus more on the Laurie Strode character, the events of parts 4, 5, and 6 are implicitly written out of the continuity, thus erasing the Jamie Lloyd character from the new canon.

After the release of Halloween: Resurrection, there were various ideas on how to proceed with a ninth installment. Josh Stolberg, who also unsuccessfully proposed a Hellraiser crossover with Bobby Florsheim, pitched Halloween: Bad Blood, which would have brought back Jamie Lloyd. The film would have been set between Halloween H20 and Halloween: Resurrection and depict Jamie as having survived multiple encounters with Michael in addition to having "honed her self defense capabilities." After a fight between Michael and Jamie, the two would be transported to a hospital where Jamie's blood would be taken and accidentally placed in the storage freezer with no name. This would set up seven random people receiving Jamie's blood via a transfusion and thereby becoming targets of Michael. Stolberg saw this plot point as a way to offer more variety to the series: "we leaned into the idea of the bloodline quite literally. It was our way of being able to expand out the franchise and make it so that we weren’t having to go after the same person every single time with each movie.” Development on a direct sequel suddenly halted when Moustapha Akkad was killed in the 2005 Amman hotel bombings while attending a wedding in Jordan, and his son Malek decided to take the series in a different direction.

Early on, the script for Halloween (2018) had Jamie appear alongside Laurie for the first time. However, subsequent rewrites changed her to 'Karen', removed any connection to the character of Jamie and actress Judy Greer was cast as Karen with a different backstory. Danielle Harris, who portrayed the character as a child, expressed disappointment that Laurie would be depicted as having a daughter that was not Jamie, while she hadn't minded Laurie having a son instead in H20. The film is a direct sequel to the original film and disregards Jamie Lloyd, Michael as Laurie's brother, and the Thorn storyline.

In 2021, Halloween Kills producer Ryan Freimann expressed his fondness for the character and desire to implement her in the current film trilogy: "I would love to find some way to bring back that character, the Jamie Lloyd character, in some way. It just didn't fit within the framework of the storyline."

=== Casting ===
Melissa Joan Hart had auditioned for the role, among various other girls. Up against her was Danielle Harris, who had previously had a reoccurring role on the daytime soap opera One Life to Live as Samantha Garretson; Harris was ultimately cast in the role after auditioning in New York. Jamie Lloyd was Danielle Harris' first feature film role, for which she appears at horror conventions and on Halloween series-related websites. Little recalled Harris coming to the session with her mother and that they "knew the minute she walked into the room" that they wanted her as Jamie, citing her intelligence. Little said that Harris "really just got it from the beginning" and was without tantrums, whining, or crying. Little did not remember the other auditions for the part of Jamie: "To me, in my memory, Jamie Lloyd was always Danielle."

Ellie Cornell described Harris as "very precocious, very grown-up, very centred, and her mother was there. Danielle was awesome, we got along extremely." Cornell said she and Harris got along famously and that they were in a "partnership – we had so many scenes together – and she made it easy." When asked about her fondness memories of working in the Halloween franchise, Cornell replied that "it was working with Dwight and Danielle" and described the support she and Harris felt: "It can be an isolating experience to be on location, living in a hotel. It sounds glamorous, it can be really lonely, truly. You’re away from your family, you’re away from the things that are familiar to you, and we just become this giant family in a really cool way."

Harris recalled filming Halloween 4 and Halloween 5 as a child with fondness: "I got to run around yelling and screaming in a Halloween costume, even thought it was really April. Basically all the stuff you really look forward to as a kid. You really don’t think about the fact that you’re working, because you’re young and having so much fun." Besides Harris, the other child actor to have a major role in Halloween 5 was Jeffrey Landman, who portrayed Billy. Landman watched Halloween 4 with Harris and her mother to become familiar with the series. Before filming started, Harris and Landman were brought to Salt Lake City to be trained by a speech pathologist who worked with the pair "on the sign language as well as discussing with us the pathology of stuttering, why people stutter, as well as under what circumstances the stutter would become more prominent." Don Shanks replaced Wilbur as Michael in Halloween 5. Shanks saw Harris as "a trooper" and remembered that "for eleven years old, she was like a little person. She was always there, and she always wanted to do her own stunts.”

Harris sought to reprise the role for the sixth installment, now titled Halloween: The Curse of Michael Myers, but the producers and Dimension Films reportedly refused to pay her the $5,000 she requested, and she was not fond of the script. The role was instead given to actress J. C. Brandy, who was a Halloween fan herself. Like Harris, the role was Brandy's first in a feature film. Brandy had conversations with Daniel Farrands about John Carpenter and The Fog and recalled "knowing I was stepping into a part that people were so attached to with another actor, and that’s not easy". Brandy went into hypothermia during the filming of her character's escape scene, as there was a snow storm that caused shooting to cease multiple times. Reshoots for the film took place in Los Angeles, California in the summer of 1995. Brandy described the cast as being "pretty bummed about the reshoots" and believed it was possible for someone to easily recognize which scenes were added later, citing their lack of lighting and depth. The reshoots altered Jamie's death from being killed with a silencer pistol in a hospital to her being impaled in a barn. Brandy preferred the original because "it was unnatural to have that line they gave me in the barn and it felt really forced, with blades going through my stomach", though she admitted to understanding the altered scene's appeal for its gore and special effects. Harris made her eventual return to the series as Annie Brackett in Rob Zombie's Halloween remake, as well as its subsequent sequel. Her representation contacted the filmmakers of the 2018 Halloween about reprising the role of Jamie in some way, but they were not interested.

== Reception ==
Not only are the movies that tell the tale of Jamie Lloyd incredibly underrated in general, her character has, in many ways, suffered the most of any character in the franchise.

— Jack Wilhelmi describing the character.

In 2013, Jamie was ranked 520th on Empire's The 666 Greatest Horror Movie Characters. Screen Rant listed Jamie as the eighth best Halloween character. /Film ranked Jamie as the 3rd best Halloween character. Medium.com lists Jamie as the 17th best out of 100 final girls. Jack Wilhelmi observed, "Like it or not, Jamie’s inclusion in the franchise brought a tremendous amount of depth and characterization to staples like Dr. Loomis and Michael Myers, giving them a foil to build off of and play against." Adrienne Tyler called Jamie "a very likable character" with just as much bravery as any other heroine in horror films and that the performance of Harris made Jamie the "perfect balance of innocence and bravery, as even though she was young, she fought for her life like any other adult character in the franchise." Dustin Pinney referred to Jamie as a "great character because we can relate to her" and "one of the brightest spots of the series" due to her determination and humanity.

Jamie was well received in Halloween 4, IGN opining that Harris "is very credible and relatable and took an idea that probably had some fans cringing -- a little girl as the hero of a Halloween sequel! -- and made it work." Dan Tabor of Cinapse called Jamie "the most tragic character of the franchise" and credited Harris with carrying Halloween 4 "rather effortlessly on her young capable shoulders with a surprisingly powerful take on the troubled young girl." The relationship between Jamie and Rachel also garnered praise. Harris received acclaim when she reprised the role a year later in Halloween 5. Adam Tyner lauded Harris as "once again exceptional in the lead role, contributing a soulful and intense performance that few actors of any age could hope to rival." WhatCulture wrote that Harris led Halloween 5 with a "sensational child actor performance". Both Eric Goldman and Louis Peitzman called Harris the best part of Halloween 5, with Peitzman adding that Harris had the "difficult task of playing mute for most of the film, but she delivers a grounded and believably terrified performance that's even stronger than her work in Halloween 4." Even in negative reviews of Halloween 5 as a whole, Harris's performance as Jamie still received praise, with Richard Harrington of the Los Angeles Times criticizing the film and asserting that Harris was "actually pretty good" in her role. Jamie's death in Halloween: The Curse of Michael Myers is considered memorable, ranking fifth in Screen Rant's Michael Myers’ 15 Most Creative Kills list and third in Collider's Michael Myers' Most Brutal Kills.

The decision to not have Jamie as the antagonist in subsequent installments has been received negatively, as Michael Tatlock opined that carrying on from the ending of Halloween 4 "would’ve brought the series into a new and more interesting path." Josh Heath observed that not having Jamie as the killer retroactively hurts Halloween 4 and "the dumb psychic link that replaced Jamie’s actual villainy in Halloween 5 is lame and serves to push the fifth installment into 'worst of the franchise' territory, just like Friday the 13th: Part V." Chad Collins called the psychic connection between Jamie and Michael "psychobabble and more complicated than it needs to be. Worse still—and I say this as a fan of both films—it further distances Michael from what makes him Michael." Jamie's role in The Curse of Michael Myers has also been criticized, with Tyler opining that the movie "did no justice to the character (and the whole 'artificial insemination' part of it was disgusting and disrespectful)".

== In popular culture ==
Harris reprised her role as Jamie in the 2012 horror film Among Friends, Harris's directorial debut. In a hallucination sequence, Jamie appears in her clown costume and calls out for Rachel.

== Sources ==
- Farrands, Daniel; Howarth, Alan (2014). Halloween: The Curse of Michael Myers, The Producer's Cut. Halloween: The Ultimate Collection (Blu-ray audio commentary). Scream Factory and Anchor Bay Entertainment.
- Little, Dwight H. (2013) [2006]. Halloween 4: The Return of Michael Myers (Audio commentary; Blu-ray). Anchor Bay Entertainment/Scream Factory.
