= Halloween: The Curse of Michael Myers (soundtrack) =

1995 soundtrack album

Halloween: The Curse of Michael Myers (Original Motion Picture Soundtrack)

Film score by Alan Howarth
- Released: August 24, 1995
- Studios: Ivy Sound; Montecito Post
- Genres: Electronic; film score
- Length: 56:41
- Label: Varèse Sarabande
- Producer: Alan Howarth

Alan Howarth chronology
Halloween 5: The Revenge of Michael Myers (1989)	Halloween: The Curse of Michael Myers (Original Motion Picture Soundtrack) (1995)	The Dentist (1996)

Professional ratings
Review scores
Source	Rating
AllMusic	2/5 stars

Halloween: The Curse of Michael Myers (Original Motion Picture Soundtrack) is a soundtrack by Alan Howarth for the film of the same name. It was released on August 24, 1995 through Varèse Sarabande.

== Development ==
The original music score for Halloween: The Curse of Michael Myers is composed and orchestrated by long-time Halloween contributor Alan Howarth, his work in the series dating back to his collaboration with John Carpenter on Halloween II. However, Howarth's score was redone by music editor Paul Rabjohns when the film went through reshoots.

A soundtrack album was released by Varèse Sarabande, and is an unusual combination of the music featured in the original cut of the film, as well as that of the final theatrical cut. According to Howarth, he helped re-score the revised cut of the film, incorporating the use of guitar and drums in addition to the original score, which had been more synthesizer and piano-based. Howarth called the final product a "fix job", with numerous elements of the film's production being in flux both during and after principal photography. In addition to Howarth's score being redone, the film's sound design was also significantly altered from Howarth's original "minimalist" design. Howarth's official score for the film was released on August 24, 1995.

The music of Alabama-based rock band Brother Cane was featured throughout the film. The music came from their 1995 release Seeds on Virgin Records. The album's hit single "And Fools Shine On" can be heard when Kara, Tim and Beth arrive at school in their car. The song is also heard during the closing credits. Three other Brother Cane songs (all from the Seeds album) are featured in the film: "Hung on a Rope", "20/20 Faith", and "Horses & Needles". "Disconnected" by the group I Found God is also featured in the film.

== Reception ==
The Time Out London film guide commented on Howarth's "jazzed-up version of John Carpenter's original electronic score: slicker than crude oil and just as unattractive."

== Track listing ==
All music is composed by Alan Howarth.

No.	Title	Length
1.	"Jamie's Escape"	4:04
2.	"Birth Ceremony"	2:50
3.	"You Can't Have the Baby"	3:37
4.	"Empty Stomach"	2:58
5.	"Watching Mom"	4:23
6.	"Kara Returns"	3:38
7.	"Thorn"	4:08
8.	"Carnival Festival"	4:07
9.	"It's Raining Red"	2:59
10.	"Look Upstairs"	6:25
11.	"It's His Game"	5:56
12.	"Maximum Security"	3:40
13.	"Operating Room"	7:56
Total length:		56:41

== Personnel ==
- Alan Howarth – composition, performance, production
- Paul Rabjohns – music editor
