= Janice Knickrehm =

American actress (1925–2013)

- Born: June 4, 1925; Andover, Massachusetts, U.S.
- Died: January 23, 2013 (aged 87); Salt Lake City, Utah, U.S.
- Occupation: Actress
- Years active: 1995–2010
- Notable work: Halloween: The Curse of Michael Myers (1995)
- Spouse: Gus (?–1990) (his death)
- Children: 7

Janice Knickrehm (June 4, 1925 – January 23, 2013) was an American actress who appeared in numerous Salt Lake City-based film productions, and is perhaps best known for her role as Ms. Blankenship in the film Halloween: The Curse of Michael Myers (1995).

== Career ==
Knickrehm, who appeared in numerous stage productions in Salt Lake City, made her feature film debut in the horror film Halloween: The Curse of Michael Myers (1995) portraying Minnie Blankenship, a boarding house owner and member of a cult harvesting the power of killer Michael Myers.

She later appeared in SLC Punk! (1998), Absence of the Good (1999), and Little Secrets (2001).

Knickrehm made an appearance at the 25th anniversary fan convention for Halloween held in Pasadena, California in 2003. She participated in a discussion panel that consisted of Kim Darby, Bradford English, and Marianne Hagan, among others, that allowed fans attending the event to ask questions of the cast and crew about the film and their experiences on the set.

== Personal life ==
Knickrehm was married to her husband, Gus for many years before his death on January 21, 1990. Together they had seven children; five sons - Gene, John, Honore, Matthew and Gus, and two daughters - Maggie and Elizabeth.

== Death ==
Knickrehm died on January 23, 2013. A memorial mass was held for Knickrehm at the Saint Vincent de Paul Catholic Church in Salt Lake City.

== Filmography ==
Year	Title	Role	Notes	Ref.
1995	Halloween: The Curse of Michael Myers	Minnie Blankenship		
1996	Invasion of Privacy	Landlady		
1997	Not in This Town	Grandma Lemble	Television film	
1997	Promised Land	Ethel Argyle		
1998	SLC Punk!	Liquor Store Woman		
1999	Absence of the Good	Agnes Thurmond	Television film	
2000	Cover Me	Joan Crowe		
2001	Little Secrets	Mrs. Neiderhoffer		
2002	Journey to Harmony	Granny		
2003	Everwood	Church Woman		
2005	Life Is Ruff	School Librarian		
2007	The Haunting of Marsten Manor	Dorothy Marsten		
2008	Wieners	Mrs. Harrison		
2010	Den Brother	Ingrid	Final film role	
