= Halloween (franchise) =

American slasher media franchise

- Official franchise logo
- Created by: John Carpenter; Debra Hill
- Original work: Halloween (1978)
- Owner: Trancas International Films (Note: Trancas International Films own the rights to the intellectual property and trademark through Compass International Pictures. Various studios hold distribution or partial rights to specific installments.)
- Years: 1978–present

Print publications
- Novels: List of novels
- Comics: List of comics

Films and television
- Films: List of films

Games
- Video games: Halloween (1983); Halloween: The Game (2026)

Halloween is an American slasher media franchise that consists of thirteen films, as well as novels, comic books, video games and other merchandise. All but one of the films focus on serial killer Michael Myers, who was committed to a sanitarium as a child for the murder of his sister, Judith Myers, in 1963. Fifteen years later, he escapes to stalk and kill the people of the fictional town of Haddonfield, Illinois. Michael's killings occur on the holiday of Halloween, on which all of the films primarily take place. Throughout the series various protagonists try to stop Myers including Laurie Strode (primarily portrayed by Jamie Lee Curtis) and psychiatrist Dr. Samuel Loomis (primarily portrayed by Donald Pleasence). The original Halloween, released in 1978, was written by John Carpenter and Debra Hill—the film's director and producer respectively. The film, itself inspired by Alfred Hitchcock's Psycho and Bob Clark's Black Christmas, is known to have inspired a long line of slasher films.

Twelve films have followed since the 1978 original was released. Michael Myers is the antagonist in all of the entries with the exception of Halloween III: Season of the Witch, a story with no connection to any other film in the series. Starting with Halloween II, most of the various sequels appeared between 1981 and 2002, including a tenth anniversary film in 1988 and a 20th anniversary sequel in 1998. In 2007, writer-director Rob Zombie created a remake of the 1978 film (and a sequel released two years later). The franchise would go dormant for nine years until a sequel to the original film, which ignores all previous sequels, was released in 2018. The sequel to the 2018 film, Halloween Kills, was released in 2021 with the most recent entry, Halloween Ends, released on October 14, 2022.

The franchise contains multiple timelines, continuities, remakes and reboots, which can make it confusing for new viewers. Forbes' Scott Mendelson called it the "Choose Your Own Adventure" of horror movie franchises. The films have collectively grossed over $884 million at the box office worldwide. The film series is ranked first at the United States box office—in adjusted 2018 dollars—when compared to other American horror film franchises. The original film received critical acclaim, while the 2018 film received mostly positive reviews. The other films have received either mixed or negative reviews from critics.

== Films ==
Film	U.S. release date	Director	Screenwriter(s)	Producer(s)
Halloween	October 25, 1978	John Carpenter	John Carpenter and Debra Hill	Debra Hill
Halloween II	October 30, 1981	Rick Rosenthal	John Carpenter and Debra Hill	Debra Hill and John Carpenter
Halloween III: Season of the Witch	October 22, 1982	Tommy Lee Wallace	Tommy Lee Wallace	Debra Hill and John Carpenter
Halloween 4: The Return of Michael Myers	October 21, 1988	Dwight H. Little	Danny Lipsius, Larry Rattner & Benjamin Ruffner and Alan B. McElroy	Paul Freeman
Halloween 5: The Revenge of Michael Myers	October 13, 1989	Dominique Othenin-Girard	Michael Jacobs & Dominique Othenin-Girard and Shem Bitterman	Ramsey Thomas
Halloween: The Curse of Michael Myers	September 29, 1995	Joe Chappelle	Daniel Farrands	Paul Freeman
Halloween H20: 20 Years Later	August 5, 1998	Steve Miner	Robert Zappia and Matt Greenberg	Paul Freeman
Halloween: Resurrection	July 12, 2002	Rick Rosenthal	Larry Brand and Sean Hood	Paul Freeman
Halloween	August 31, 2007	Rob Zombie	Rob Zombie	Malek Akkad, Andy Gould and Rob Zombie
Halloween II	August 28, 2009	Rob Zombie	Rob Zombie	Malek Akkad, Andy Gould and Rob Zombie
Halloween	October 19, 2018	David Gordon Green	Jeff Fradley, Danny McBride & David Gordon Green	Malek Akkad, Jason Blum & Bill Block
Halloween Kills	October 15, 2021	David Gordon Green	Scott Teems, Danny McBride & David Gordon Green	Malek Akkad, Jason Blum & Bill Block
Halloween Ends	October 14, 2022	David Gordon Green	Paul Brad Logan, Chris Bernier, Danny McBride & David Gordon Green	Malek Akkad, Jason Blum & Bill Block

=== Overview ===
Halloween story chronology
Original continuity
- Halloween (1978)
- Halloween II (1981)
- Halloween 4: The Return of Michael Myers (1988)
- Halloween 5: The Revenge of Michael Myers (1989)
- Halloween: The Curse of Michael Myers (1995)
Anthology continuity
- Halloween III: Season of the Witch (1982)
Dimension Films continuity
- Halloween (1978)
- Halloween II (1981)
- Halloween H20: 20 Years Later (1998)
- Halloween: Resurrection (2002)
Remake continuity
- Halloween (2007)
- Halloween II (2009)
Blumhouse continuity
- Halloween (1978)
- Halloween (2018)
- Halloween Kills (2021)
- Halloween Ends (2022)

An infographic illustrating the continuity between the Halloween films

Described by Scott Mendelson of Forbes as the "Choose Your Own Adventure" of horror movie franchises, the franchise is notable for its multiple timelines, continuities, remakes and reboots, which can make it confusing for new viewers, often leading to articles explaining the previous films before each new release.

The original Halloween (1978), co-written by John Carpenter and Debra Hill and directed by Carpenter, tells the story of Michael Myers as he stalks and kills teenage babysitters on Halloween night. The film begins with six-year-old Michael (Will Sandin) killing his older sister Judith (Sandy Johnson) on Halloween night 1963 in the fictional town of Haddonfield, Illinois. He is subsequently hospitalized at Warren County's Smith's Grove Sanitarium. Fifteen years later, Michael (Nick Castle) escapes from Smith's Grove and returns to his hometown while being pursued by his psychiatrist, Dr. Sam Loomis (Donald Pleasence). Michael stalks high school student Laurie Strode (Jamie Lee Curtis) and her friends as they babysit. Murdering Laurie's friends, Michael finally attacks Laurie herself, but she manages to fend him off long enough for Loomis to save her. Loomis shoots Michael off a balcony, but when Loomis goes to check Michael's body, he has vanished.

Halloween II (1981) picks up from where Halloween left off. Michael (Dick Warlock) goes to Haddonfield Memorial Hospital after learning via a radio news broadcast that Laurie has been taken there, killing everyone who comes between them. The story reveals that Laurie is actually Michael's other sister, who was given up for adoption as an infant. After Michael chases Laurie throughout the hospital, he corners Loomis and Laurie in an operating room, where Loomis causes an explosion as Laurie escapes. Michael, engulfed in flames, stumbles out of the room before finally losing consciousness and falling to the ground, seemingly dead.

Halloween III: Season of the Witch was an attempt to redirect the Halloween film series into being an anthology film series. This installment follows the story of Dr. Dan Challis (Tom Atkins) as he tries to solve the mysterious murder of a patient in his hospital. Joined by the patient's daughter Ellie (Stacey Nelkin), he travels to the small town of Santa Mira, California. The pair discover that Silver Shamrock Novelties, a company run by Conal Cochran (Dan O'Herlihy), is attempting to use the mystic powers of the Stonehenge rocks to resurrect the ancient witchcraft of the Celtic festival, Samhain. Cochran is using his Silver Shamrock Halloween masks to achieve his goal, which will kill all the children wearing his masks as they watch a special Silver Shamrock commercial airing Halloween night. After destroying Cochran and his henchmen, Challis desperately tries to convince the television station managers not to air the commercial. The film ends with Challis screaming for a final station to stop the commercial.

Halloween 4: The Return of Michael Myers, as the title suggests, features the return of Michael Myers (George P. Wilbur) to the film series. This film reveals that Michael has been in a comatose state for ten years following the explosion in Halloween II. While being transferred back to Smith's Grove, Michael awakens upon hearing that Laurie Strode died in a car accident and left behind a daughter, Jamie Lloyd (Danielle Harris). Michael escapes and makes his way to Haddonfield in search of his niece, while Dr. Loomis pursues him once again. Eventually, the police track Michael down and shoot him several times before he falls down a mine shaft. Loomis also discovers that Michael's niece has inherited his evil.

Halloween 5: The Revenge of Michael Myers picks up from where the previous film ends and has Michael (Don Shanks) surviving the gunshots and the fall down the mine; he stumbles upon a hermit who bandages him up. One year later, Michael awakens and kills the hermit and showing signs of a psychic connection to Jamie, Michael tracks her to a local child mental health clinic. Using Jamie as bait, Loomis manages to capture Michael. The film ends with Michael being taken into police custody, only to be broken out of jail by a mysterious stranger, all dressed in black (whose black boots were shown throughout the entire film).

Halloween: The Curse of Michael Myers picks up the story six years after the events of Halloween 5. The mysterious stranger who broke Michael out of jail also kidnapped Jamie Lloyd (J. C. Brandy). Jamie, having been held captive by the Man In Black, gives birth to a baby boy with whom she escapes, while Michael (George P. Wilbur) pursues them. Michael kills Jamie and continues searching for her baby, who she managed to hide before Michael found & killed her. The infant is found and brought to safety by Tommy Doyle (Paul Rudd), the young boy who was babysat by Laurie Strode in the first film. It is revealed that Michael is driven by the Curse of Thorn, which forces a person to kill their entire family in order to save all of civilization. The Man In Black is revealed to be Dr. Loomis's colleague, Dr. Terrence Wynn (Mitchell Ryan), who is part of a cult called the Cult of Thorn, who, if necessary, watch over the person who has the Curse of Thorn so that said person may complete their task. With the help of Kara Strode (Marianne Hagan), Laurie's adoptive cousin, Tommy keeps the infant safe from Michael, who slaughters Wynn and other members of the Cult of Thorn. Michael is finally subdued by Tommy, who injects him with large quantities of tranquilizers inside the Smith's Grove Sanitarium before he and Kara escape with Jamie's son. Loomis stays behind, presumably to ensure that Michael dies. The film then ends with it being shown that Michael has once again escaped, this time leaving behind his mask, and with Loomis being heard screaming, presumably due to discovering that Michael has once again escaped.

Halloween H20: 20 Years Later opens twenty years after the events of the first two films and establishes that Michael Myers (Chris Durand) has been believed to be dead by the general public since the explosion at Haddonfield Memorial Hospital in 1978. There is fan debate as to whether the film ignores the 4th-6th films. It is revealed that Laurie Strode (Curtis) faked her own death so that she could go into hiding from her brother. Now working as the headmistress of a private school under the name "Keri Tate", Laurie continues to live in fear of Michael's return. Her son John (Josh Hartnett) attends the same school. Laurie's fears become reality when Michael shows up at the school and begins killing John's friends. Laurie manages to get John and his girlfriend (Michelle Williams) to safety, but decides to face Michael. After a back and forth fight, Laurie decapitates Michael with a fire axe.

Halloween: Resurrection picks up three years after H20 and reveals that Michael escaped after swapping clothes with a paramedic, crushing the man's larynx so that he could not talk, and that that was whom Laurie killed. Laurie was committed to a mental institution following her having a mental breakdown due to learning that she had killed the wrong person. Michael (Brad Loree) shows up at the mental institution and kills Laurie, then travels back to his family home in Haddonfield, but finds a group of college students filming an Internet reality show. Michael murders the cast and crew until he is electrocuted by the only surviving student, Sara Moyer (Bianca Kajlich), and the show's creator, Freddie Harris (Busta Rhymes). Michael's body and the bodies of his victims are then taken to the morgue. As the medical examiner begins to inspect Michael's body, he suddenly awakens.

Halloween (2007), a remake of the original film, focuses on the events that led Michael Myers (Daeg Faerch) to kill his family. It also identifies Laurie as Michael's sister early on. On Halloween, Michael murders a school bully, his older sister Judith and her boyfriend, and his mother's abusive boyfriend. Committed to Smith's Grove Sanitarium, Michael closes himself off from everyone and stops speaking. Michael's mother Deborah (Sheri Moon Zombie) commits suicide out of guilt. Fifteen years later, Michael (Tyler Mane) escapes and heads to Haddonfield to find his sister, with his psychiatrist Dr. Sam Loomis (Malcolm McDowell) in pursuit. Michael finds his sister living with the Strode family and going by the name Laurie (Scout Taylor-Compton). After killing nearly all of her friends and family, Michael then kidnaps Laurie and attempts to explain to her that he is her brother through the use of a picture he has kept of himself and her as an infant. Unable to understand, Laurie fights back and eventually uses Loomis's gun to shoot Michael in the head. Laurie screams in horror as the credits roll.

Halloween II (2009), a sequel to the remake, picks up right where the previous film leaves off before jumping ahead one year. Here, Michael is presumed dead but resurfaces after a vision of his deceased mother informs him that he must track Laurie down so that they can "come home" together. In the film, Michael and Laurie have a mental link, with the two sharing visions of their mother. It is also revealed that Laurie's original name is Angel Myers. During the film's climax, Laurie kills Michael by stabbing him repeatedly in the chest and face with his own knife. The final scene suggests that she has taken on her brother's psychosis as she dons his mask and is committed to an asylum, hallucinating her mother walking with a white horse. In the Director's Cut, Michael and Laurie are both gunned down by the police.

Halloween (2018) is a sequel to the original film, ignoring the sibling relationship and other continuities established in previous installments. In this "Universal/Blumhouse" timeline, Michael (James Jude Courtney) was arrested in 1978 and has spent forty years back in Smith's Grove Sanitarium. During a prison transfer on the night before Halloween, Michael is able to escape the bus after it crashes and returns to Haddonfield for another rampage. After Michael kills his deranged psychologist, who had taken him to Laurie's home, he engages in a showdown with Laurie, her daughter Karen, and her granddaughter Allyson. The trio ultimately trap him in her house, which they set ablaze.

Halloween Kills (2021) takes place immediately after its predecessor, with firefighters arriving at the blazing building, unwittingly freeing Michael to continue his killing spree. Laurie is taken to the hospital with life-threatening injuries. Karen stays behind with Laurie while Allyson joins a mob who hunts down Michael. Michael slaughters the entire mob except for Allyson. The film ends with Michael stabbing Karen to death.

Halloween Ends (2022) picks up four years after Kills and sees Laurie reeling from the events of Michael's rampage by moving into a new home with Allyson and writing a memoir. The film focuses on Corey Cunningham, an ex-babysitter who has been scarred by accidentally killing the boy he was watching and rendering him a social reject. Laurie protects Corey from a group of bullies and introduces him to Allyson, who immediately develop feelings for each other. Corey encounters a now-weakened Michael in the sewers, ending with the two locking eyes and Michael letting him go. This sends Corey on a murdering spree, with Laurie tracking him and trying to convince Allyson to end their relationship. On Halloween, after making plans to skip town with Allyson, Corey steals Michael's mask in a brawl and goes on a mission to murder everyone that disrespected him. After a fight, Allyson abandons Laurie in a fit of rage, and Corey sneaks into their home with the intent of killing Laurie. She defends herself by shooting him, but Corey stabs himself in the neck to frame Laurie for his death. Michael returns for his mask, kills Corey by snapping his neck, and fights Laurie in a final confrontation in the kitchen. Allyson returns to assist her grandmother, and Laurie gets the upper hand before cutting Michael's throat and slicing his wrist, and he goes unconscious due to extreme blood loss. The townspeople come together to watch Michael's body be thrown into an industrial shredder, ending his reign of terror for good.

=== Development ===
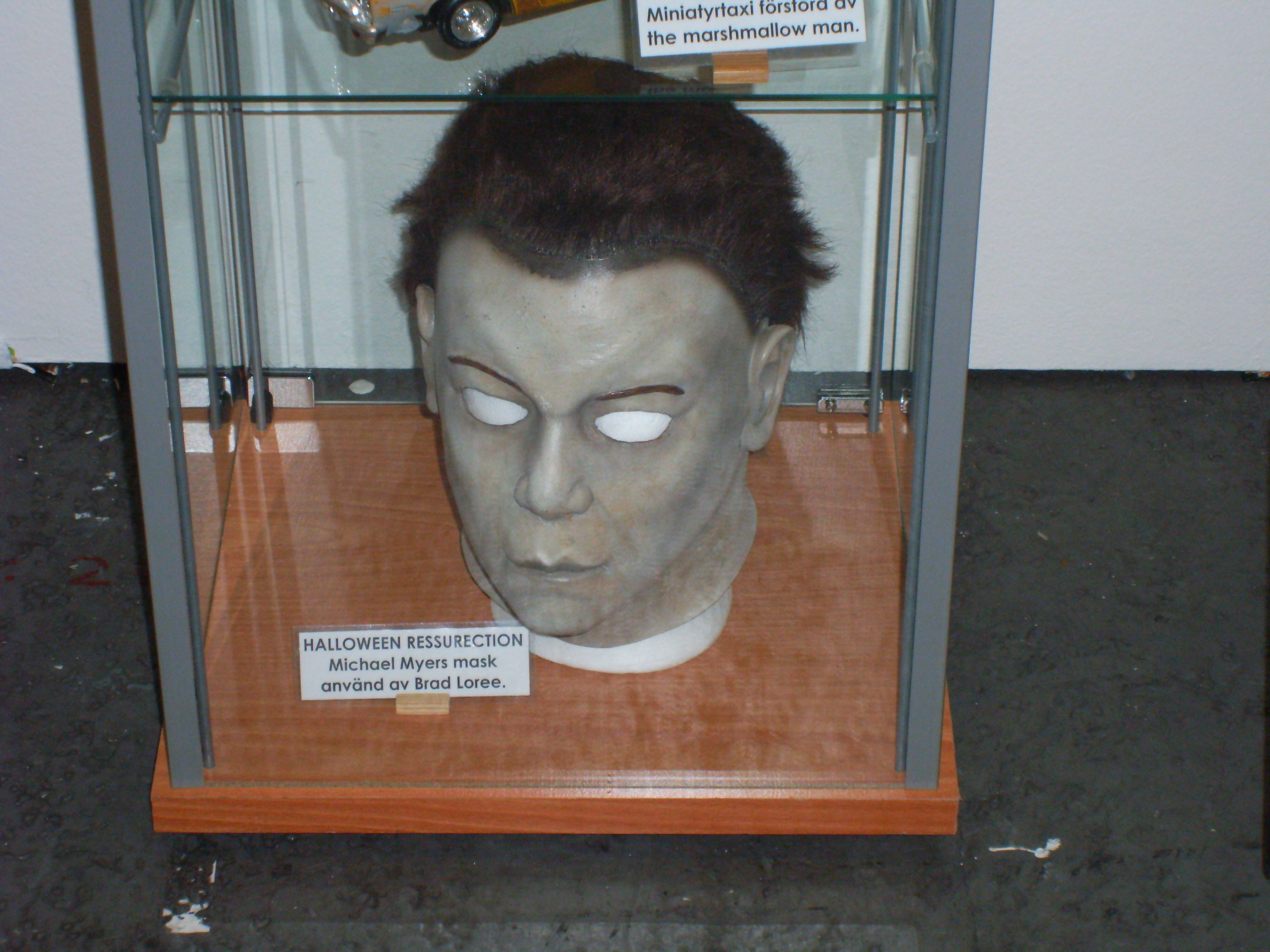
Michael Myers mask from Halloween: Resurrection

After viewing John Carpenter's film Assault on Precinct 13 (1976) at the Milan Film Festival, independent film producer Irwin Yablans and financier Moustapha Akkad sought out Carpenter to direct for them a film about a psychotic killer stalking babysitters. Carpenter and Debra Hill began drafting a story. There is an urban myth that the film at one point was supposed to be called The Babysitter Murders but Yablans has since debunked this stating that it was always intended to be called (and take place on) Halloween.

Moustapha Akkad fronted the $300,000 for the film's budget, even though he was worried about the tight schedule, low budget, and Carpenter's limited experience as a filmmaker. He finally decided to finance the film after Carpenter relayed the entire film to Akkad, "in a suspenseful way, almost frame for frame", and opted not to take any fees for directing the film. The low budget forced wardrobe and props to be crafted from items on hand or that could be purchased inexpensively, this included the trademark mask worn by Michael Myers throughout the film. Production designer, art director, location scout and co-editor Tommy Lee Wallace created Michael's mask from a William Shatner Halloween mask, purchased for $1.98. The limited budget also dictated the filming location and time schedule. Halloween was filmed in 21 days in the spring of 1978 primarily in South Pasadena, California. An abandoned house owned by a church stood in as the Myers house. Two homes on Orange Grove Avenue in Hollywood were used for the film's climax.

We investigated a number of 3-D processes ... but they were far too expensive for this particular project. Also, most of the projects we do involve a lot of night shooting – evil lurks at night. It's hard to do that in 3-D.

— Debra Hill (writer/producer) on putting Halloween into 3-D.

Following the success of Halloween, Yablans and Akkad began working on Halloween II. There was initial discussion about filming Halloween II in 3-D, but the idea never came to fruition. After Halloween II was released, Carpenter and Hill were approached about creating a third Halloween film, but they were reluctant to pledge commitment. The pair agreed to participate in the new project only if it was not a sequel to Halloween II, which meant no Michael Myers. Most of the filming for Halloween III: Season of the Witch took place on location in the small coastal town of Loleta in Humboldt County, California. Familiar Foods, a milk bottling plant in Loleta, served as the Silver Shamrock Novelties factory, but all special effects involving fire, smoke, and explosions were filmed at Post Studios.

After Halloween III was released, Michael Myers was brought back with 1988's Halloween 4: The Return of Michael Myers, where he has stayed for the remainder of the series. Four more sequels would follow, between 1989 and 2002, before the series would take a break for five years. On June 4, 2006, Dimension Films announced that Rob Zombie, director of House of 1000 Corpses and The Devil's Rejects, would be creating the next Halloween film. Bob Weinstein approached Rob Zombie about making the film, and Zombie, who was a fan of the original Halloween and friend of John Carpenter, jumped at the chance to make a Halloween film for Dimension Films. Before Dimension went public with the news, Zombie felt obligated to inform John Carpenter, out of respect, of the plans to remake his film. Carpenter's request was for Zombie to "make it his own [film]". Zombie's film would combine the elements of prequel and remake with the original concept, with considerable original content in the new film. Zombie also wanted to reinvent the character, as he felt Michael, along with Freddy Krueger, Jason Voorhees, and Pinhead, had become too familiar to audiences, and as a result, less scary. Zombie delved deeper into Michael Myers's mythology. Michael's mask was even given its own story to provide an explanation as to why he wears it, instead of having the character simply steal a random mask from a hardware store, as in the original film. Zombie wanted to bring Michael closer to what a psychopath really is, and wanted the mask to be a way for Michael to hide.

In 2008, a sequel to the 2007 remake was announced, with French filmmakers Julien Maury and Alexandre Bustillo in negotiations to direct. Instead, Zombie was resigned to write and direct the sequel, with the film taking place after the end of his remake. In an interview, Zombie expressed how the exhaustion of creating the first Halloween made him not want to come back for a sequel, but after a year of cooling down he was more open to the idea. The writer/director explains that with the sequel, he was no longer bound by a sense of needing to retain any "John Carpenter-ness", as he could now do "whatever [he] wants to do". Instead of focusing on Michael, Zombie chose to look more at the psychological consequences on Laurie after the events of the remake. As Zombie explains, after Michael murdered her friends and family, Laurie became a "wreck", who continually sinks lower as the film moves forward. Rob Zombie declined to return to film the second sequel to the 2007 remake. The second sequel, Halloween 3D, was cancelled in 2012.

A new effort to make a Halloween film, Halloween Returns, was attempted in 2015, unrelated to the Rob Zombie films. This ultimately failed, and was cancelled when Dimension Films lost the filming rights to Halloween. On May 23, 2016, it was reported that Miramax and Blumhouse Productions were developing a new film, which they would co-finance. On February 9, 2017, John Carpenter announced that a new Halloween film was going to be written by David Gordon Green and Danny McBride and will be directed by Green. The film is a sequel to the original Halloween, and will ignore all of the previous sequels. Jamie Lee Curtis confirmed that she would reprise her role as Laurie Strode, and Judy Greer entered negotiations to play Laurie's daughter Karen Strode. Andi Matichak signed on to play Karen Strode's daughter and Laurie's granddaughter. The film was distributed by Universal Pictures, their first involvement in the franchise since distributing 1982's Halloween III: Season of the Witch. John Carpenter returned to score the film, saying, "I'll be consulting with the director to see what he feels. I could create a new score, we could update the old score and amplify it, or we could combine those two things. I'll have to see the movie to see what it requires." Nick Castle reprised his role as Michael Myers. Filming began on January 13, 2018, concluding on February 19, 2018. The film was released on October 19, 2018.

In June 2019, two sequels were announced to the 2018 film, with Green returning to write the script and direct and Curtis, Greer, and Matichak reprising their roles. The titles and release dates of two sequels were announced as Halloween Kills, set to be released on October 16, 2020, and Halloween Ends, set to be released on October 15, 2021. Teems was confirmed as a co-writer for Halloween Kills, while Paul Brad Logan and Chris Bernier were announced to co-write Halloween Ends. However, due to the concerns of the COVID-19 pandemic, both films were delayed, with Halloween Kills released on October 15, 2021, and Halloween Ends released on October 14, 2022.

=== Music ===
Halloween theme
John Carpenter's theme for the original Halloween, which was reproduced for the sequels

John Carpenter composed the music to the first three films. For Halloween, Carpenter chose to use a piano melody played in a 5/4 time rhythm instead of a symphonic soundtrack. Critic James Berardinelli calls the score "relatively simple and unsophisticated", but admits that "Halloween's music is one of its strongest assets." Carpenter stated in an interview, "I can play just about any keyboard, but I can't read or write a note." In the end credits, Carpenter bills himself as the "Bowling Green Orchestra" for performing the film's score, but he did receive assistance from composer Dan Wyman, a music professor at San Jose State University.

The score for Halloween II is a variation of John Carpenter's compositions from the first film, particularly the main theme's familiar piano melody played. The score was performed on a synthesizer organ rather than the piano used for Halloween. One reviewer for the BBC described the revised score as having "a more Gothic feel". The reviewer asserted that it "doesn't sound quite as good as the original piece", but "it still remains a classic piece of music".

Music remained an important element in establishing the atmosphere of Halloween III. Just as in Halloween and Halloween II, there was no symphonic score. Much of the music was composed to solicit "false startles" from the audience. The soundtrack was composed by John Carpenter and Alan Howarth, who had also worked on the score for Halloween II. The score of Halloween III differed greatly from the familiar main theme of the original and its first sequel. Carpenter replaced the familiar piano melody with a slower, electronic theme played on a synthesizer with beeping tonalities. Howarth explains how he and Carpenter composed the music for the third film:

The music style of John Carpenter and myself has further evolved in this film soundtrack by working exclusively with synthesizers to produce our music. This has led to a certain procedural routine. The film is first transferred to a time coded video tape and synchronized to a 24 track master audio recorder; then while watching the film we compose the music to these visual images. The entire process goes quite rapidly and has 'instant gratification', allowing us to evaluate the score in synch to the picture. This is quite an invaluable asset.

Following Carpenter's departure from the series, Howarth would stay on board as the sole composer for the next two sequels, and also acted as the lead composer on Halloween: The Curse of Michael Myers, with Paul Rabjohns providing additional music when the initial edit of the film was substantially re-filmed. While Halloween H20 credits John Ottman as its sole composer, in reality most of the soundtrack was provided by Scream composer Marco Beltrami, using a mixture of music from that film and a few original cues written by Beltrami, after the producers disliked Ottman's score. Danny Lux provided the soundtrack for Halloween: Resurrection, while Tyler Bates composed the soundtracks for both the 2007 Halloween reboot and its 2009 sequel.

=== Documentary ===
Halloween: 25 Years of Terror is a DVD released on July 25, 2006, featuring a documentary on the Halloween films, narrated by P. J. Soles and featuring interviews from many of the cast members as well as filmmakers of the Halloween films and a lot of footage from the series as well. It has panel discussions with members from the casts and crews of most of the Halloween films, plus other celebrities and filmmakers such as Rob Zombie and Clive Barker as well as film critics. All of the panel discussions took place at a 25th anniversary convention in Pasadena, California (one of the filming locations of the original Halloween) in October 2003. It also has extended versions of interviews featured in the documentary and much more. In 2010, The Biography Channel produced a television special titled Halloween: The Inside Story, which premiered on October 28, 2010.

=== Future ===
Halloween Ends was meant to conclude the new timeline set forward by the 2018 film, but Jason Blum expressed interest in making further films in October 2021: "I would love to extend it. If Malek [Akkad] would like us, I'd love to extend it, but we're very busy making sure the third movie is spectacular because that's our immediate job and if it goes beyond that, I'd be thrilled. But there are currently no plans for us to be involved after this third movie." John Carpenter explained that possible future installments were dependent on the commercial success of Halloween Ends, although he acknowledged that Green was adamant in Halloween Ends being their story's ending.

In an interview with The New York Times, Jamie Lee Curtis commented that the four films, commencing with the 1978 Halloween and concluding with Halloween Ends, were self-contained, although there was still the possibility of a new narrative being adapted into future films. Green stated that he was confident on parting with Jamie Lee Curtis' Laurie Strode with the film, though he acknowledged the possibility of eventually some filmmakers creating a "new Laurie" with some plot twist to continue the franchise's mythology. Curtis had previously confirmed in an essay for People that Halloween Ends marked her last appearance in the franchise; Jude Courtney likewise affirmed to Screen Rant that, alongside Curtis, he feels "done" with the franchise due to both his age and career trajectory, having felt Halloween and Halloween Kills as playoffs and Halloween Ends as a Super Bowl win so he decided to retire as the character triumphantly.

Jason Blum later stated that, while it would not necessarily be the final film in the franchise, it will be the last Halloween film under Blumhouse Productions, with the intellectual property rights reverting to producer Malek Akkad following the release of Halloween Ends. By October 2023, Miramax had beat out Blumhouse and A24 in acquiring the Halloween television rights, with the intention to develop a Halloween television series.

In March 2024, Marc Helwig revealed that the series would serve as a creative reset completely and spinning out of the original film, as opposed to continuing the storyline from the most recent films.

== Recurring cast and characters ==
List indicators

This section includes characters who will appear or have appeared in three or more films in the series.

- An empty grey cell indicates the character was not in the film, or that the character's official presence has not yet been confirmed.
- ^{A} indicates an appearance through archival footage or audio.
- ^{C} indicates a cameo role.
- ^{P} indicates an appearance in onscreen photographs.
- ^{V} indicates a voice-only role.
- ^{Y} indicates a younger version of the character.
- ^{U} indicates an unmasked role.

Character	Halloween	Halloween II	Halloween III: Season of the Witch	Halloween 4: The Return of Michael Myers	Halloween 5: The Revenge of Michael Myers	Halloween: The Curse of Michael Myers	Halloween H20: 20 Years Later	Halloween: Resurrection	Halloween	Halloween II	Halloween	Halloween Kills	Halloween Ends
Character	1978	1981	1982	1988	1989	1995	1998	2002	2007	2009	2018	2021	2022
Michael Myers The Shape	Nick Castle Tony Moran^{U} Will Sandin^{Y}	Dick Warlock Nick Castle^{A} Tony Moran^{A} Adam Gunn^{Y}	Nick Castle^{A}	George P. Wilbur Erik Preston^{Y}	Don Shanks	George P. Wilbur	Chris Durand	Brad Loree	Tyler Mane Daeg Faerch^{Y}	Tyler Mane Chase Wright Vanek^{Y}	James Jude Courtney Nick Castle	James Jude Courtney Nick Castle Airon Armstrong^{Y} Christian Michael Pates^{Y}	James Jude Courtney Nick Castle^{V}
Laurie Strode	Jamie Lee Curtis	Jamie Lee Curtis Nichole Drucker^{Y}	Jamie Lee Curtis^{A}	Jamie Lee Curtis^{P}	Mentioned	Mentioned	Jamie Lee Curtis	Jamie Lee Curtis	Scout Taylor-Compton Sydnie and Myla Pitzer^{Y} Lela Altman^{Y}	Scout Taylor-Compton	Jamie Lee Curtis	Jamie Lee Curtis	Jamie Lee Curtis
Dr. Samuel "Sam" Loomis	Donald Pleasence	Donald Pleasence		Donald Pleasence	Donald Pleasence	Donald Pleasence	Tom Kane^{V} Donald Pleasence^{P}		Malcolm McDowell	Malcolm McDowell	Colin Mahan^{V}	Colin Mahan^{V} Tom Jones Jr.	
Sheriff Leigh Brackett	Charles Cyphers	Charles Cyphers		Mentioned					Brad Dourif	Brad Dourif		Charles Cyphers	
Marion Chambers	Nancy Stephens	Nancy Stephens					Nancy Stephens					Nancy Stephens	
Annie Brackett	Nancy Kyes	Nancy Kyes							Danielle Harris	Danielle Harris	Mentioned	Nancy Kyes^{A}^{P}	
Thomas "Tommy" Doyle	Brian Andrews	Brian Andrews^{A}		Danny Ray		Paul Rudd			Skyler Gisondo			Anthony Michael Hall	
Lindsey Wallace	Kyle Richards	Kyle Richards^{A}		Leslie L. Rohland					Jenny Gregg Stewart			Kyle Richards	Kyle Richards
Dr. Terence Wynn	Robert Phalen				Don Shanks	Mitchell Ryan							
Judith Myers	Sandy Johnson	Mentioned				Mentioned	Mentioned	Mentioned	Hanna R. Hall	Hanna R. Hall^{P}	Sandy Johnson^{A}	Mentioned	
Lynda Van Der Klok	P. J. Soles	Mentioned					Mentioned	Mentioned	Kristina Klebe	Kristina Klebe^{P}	Mentioned	P. J. Soles^{P}	
Bob Simms	John Michael Graham	Mentioned						Mentioned	Nick Mennell	Nick Mennell^{P}	Mentioned	Bob Odenkirk^{P}	
Lonnie Elam	Brent Le Page										Mentioned	Robert Longstreet Tristian Eggerling^{Y}	
Jamie Lloyd				Danielle Harris	Danielle Harris	J. C. Brandy Danielle Harris^{Y}^{A}							
Rachel Carruthers				Ellie Cornell	Ellie Cornell	Mentioned							
Sheriff Ben Meeker				Beau Starr	Beau Starr	Mentioned							
Deborah Myers									Sheri Moon Zombie	Sheri Moon Zombie			
Lou Martini Big Lou									Daniel Roebuck	Daniel Roebuck			
Karen Nelson (née Strode)											Judy Greer Sophia Miller^{Y}	Judy Greer	Judy Greer^{A}^{P}
Allyson Nelson											Andi Matichak	Andi Matichak	Andi Matichak
Deputy Frank Hawkins											Will Patton	Will Patton Thomas Mann^{Y}	Will Patton
Sheriff Barker											Omar Dorsey	Omar Dorsey	Omar Dorsey
Cameron Elam											Dylan Arnold	Dylan Arnold	Dylan Arnold^{A}
Vanessa Wilson											Carmela McNeal	Carmela McNeal	Carmela McNeal^{A}
Sondra Dickerson											Diva Tyler	Diva Tyler	Diva Tyler
Julian Morrisey											Jibrail Nantambu	Jibrail Nantambu	Jibrail Nantambu

== Reception ==
=== Box office ===
The Halloween series, when compared to the other top-grossing American horror series—A Nightmare on Elm Street, Child's Play, Friday the 13th, Saw, Scream, and The Texas Chainsaw Massacre—and adjusting for 2023 inflation is the highest-grossing horror series in the United States at approximately $1.09 billion. Next in line is Friday the 13th at $908.4 million, followed by the Nightmare on Elm Street series with $793.5 million. The Scream film series is in fourth place with $779.5 million, followed by the Saw series with $688.3 million, The Texas Chainsaw Massacre with $459.7 million, and the Child's Play film series rounding out the list with $305.2 million.

Film	U.S. release date	Budget	Box office revenue			Ref.
Film	U.S. release date	Budget	United States	Other territories	Worldwide	Ref.
Halloween (1978)	October 25, 1978	$325,000	$47,160,000	$23,000,000	$70,160,000	
Halloween II (1981)	October 30, 1981	$2.5 million	$25,533,818		$25,533,818	
Halloween III: Season of the Witch	October 22, 1982	$2.5 million	$14,400,000		$14,400,000	
Halloween 4: The Return of Michael Myers	October 21, 1988	$5 million	$17,768,757		$17,768,757	
Halloween 5: The Revenge of Michael Myers	October 13, 1989	$5 million	$11,642,254		$11,642,254	
Halloween: The Curse of Michael Myers	September 29, 1995	$5 million	$15,116,634		$15,116,634	
Halloween H20: 20 Years Later	August 5, 1998	$17 million	$55,041,738	$20,000,000	$75,041,738	
Halloween: Resurrection	July 12, 2002	$13 million	$30,354,442	$7,310,413	$37,664,855	
Halloween (2007)	August 31, 2007	$15 million	$58,272,029	$22,188,919	$80,460,948	
Halloween II (2009)	August 28, 2009	$15 million	$33,392,973	$6,028,494	$39,421,467	
Halloween (2018)	October 19, 2018	$10 million	$159,342,015	$100,597,820	$259,939,835	
Halloween Kills	October 15, 2021	$20 million	$92,002,155	$41,421,809	$133,423,964	
Halloween Ends	October 14, 2022	$33 million	$64,079,860	$41,320,936	$105,400,796	
Total		$143.3 million^{(A)}	$624,106,635	$261,859,362	$885,966,037	
List indicators: A light grey cell indicates the information is not available for the film.; (A) indicates an estimated figure based on available numbers.

=== Critical response ===
Film	Rotten Tomatoes	Metacritic	CinemaScore
Halloween (1978)	97% (93 reviews)	91 (21 reviews)	
Halloween II (1981)	27% (107 reviews)	40 (11 reviews)	
Halloween III: Season of the Witch	50% (48 reviews)	50 (11 reviews)	D
Halloween 4: The Return of Michael Myers	42% (35 reviews)	34 (10 reviews)	
Halloween 5: The Revenge of Michael Myers	10% (30 reviews)	28 (10 reviews)	
Halloween: The Curse of Michael Myers	8% (39 reviews)	10 (13 reviews)	
Halloween H20: Twenty Years Later	54% (69 reviews)	52 (20 reviews)	B-
Halloween: Resurrection	10% (71 reviews)	19 (17 reviews)	B+
Halloween (2007)	28% (122 reviews)	47 (18 reviews)	B-
Halloween II (2009)	25% (85 reviews)	35 (17 reviews)	
Halloween (2018)	79% (385 reviews)	67 (51 reviews)	B+
Halloween Kills	38% (276 reviews)	42 (45 reviews)	B-
Halloween Ends	40% (266 reviews)	47 (46 reviews)	C+

== Other media ==
=== Literature ===
==== Novels ====
When the original Halloween was released in 1978, a novelization of the film followed just a year later. Written by Curtis Richards, the book follows the events of the film, but expands on the festival of Samhain and Michael's time at Smith's Grove Sanitarium. In 2024, Printed in Blood published a new edition of the novelization featuring more than 100 illustrations by artist Orlando Arocena.

Halloween II, Halloween III: Season of the Witch, and Halloween 4 each received novelizations as well. Jack Martin would write Halloween II, which was released alongside its film counterpart. Martin included an additional victim of Michael's in this novel. Jack Martin also wrote Halloween III: Season of the Witch. Halloween IV, released in October 1988 and written by Nicholas Grabowsky, also followed the events of the film in which it was adapted from. A novelization of the 2018 film by John Passarella was released on October 23, 2018.

Over a four-month period, Berkley Books published three young adult novels written by Kelly O'Rourke. The novels are original stories created by O'Rourke, with no continuity with the films. The first, released on October 1, 1997, titled The Scream Factory, follows a group of friends who set up a haunted house attraction in the basement of Haddonfield City Hall, only to be stalked and killed by Michael Myers while they are there. The Old Myers Place is the second novel, released on December 1, 1997, and focuses on Mary White, who moves into the Myers house with her family. Michael returns home and begins stalking and attacking Mary and her friends. O'Rourke's final novel, The Mad House, was released on February 1, 1998. The Mad House features a young girl, Christine Ray, who joins a documentary film crew that travels to haunted locations, and they are headed to Smith's Grove Sanitarium, where they are confronted by Michael.

==== Comic books ====
The first Halloween comic was published by Brian Pulido's Chaos! Comics. Simply titled Halloween, it was intended to be a one-issue special, but eventually two sequels spawned: Halloween II: The Blackest Eyes and Halloween III: The Devil's Eyes. All of the stories were written by Phil Nutman, with Daniel Farrands—writer for Halloween: The Curse of Michael Myers—assisting on the first issue, and David Brewer and Justiniano worked on the illustrations. Tommy Doyle is the main protagonist in each of the issues, focusing on his attempts to kill Michael Myers. The first issue includes back story on Michael's childhood, while the third picks up after the events of the film Halloween H20. These comics were based on Daniel Farrand's concept for Halloween: Resurrection. He had been approached by the producers to pitch a follow-up to Halloween H20. His idea was to have Tommy Doyle incarcerated at Smith's Grove for Michael Myers' crimes, only to escape and reunite with Lindsay Wallace. Together, they study the journals of Dr. Loomis and find out more about Michael's childhood. The movie would have explored Michael's time at Smith's Grove and his relationship with Dr. Loomis, before returning to Tommy and Lindsay, who are attacked by the adult Michael Myers. Upon defeating him and removing his mask, they discover Laurie Strode, who has taken over her brother's mantle. Farrand's logic was that, since Jamie Lee Curtis was contracted to cameo in Halloween: Resurrection, they should make that cameo as significant and surprising as possible. Although the studio did not follow up on his pitch, Farrands was able to tell his story in comic book form.

One Good Scare written by Stefan Hutchinson, and illustrated by Peter Fielding, was released in 2003. The main character in this comic is Lindsey Wallace, the young girl who first saw Michael Myers alongside Tommy Doyle in the original 1978 film. Hutchinson wanted to bring the character back to his roots, and away from the "lumbering Jason-clone" the film sequels had made him. One Good Scare came about because Hutchinson wanted to produce a comic book to celebrate the series' twenty-fifth anniversary, to be sold as a collectible at a Halloween convention in South Pasadena. Due to the positive reception to One Good Scare, Hutchinson hoped to use the comic as a "demo" for getting a distribution deal, but was unable to do so, due to rights issues.

While waiting to acquire the rights to publish more Halloween comics, Stefan Hutchinson worked on the documentary Halloween: 25 Years of Terror with Malek Akkad. Together, they developed ideas for possible Halloween stories that would be "connected into a larger tale, so the idea was that it would use the serial aspect of comic books to create different storylines than would be possible in the films." On July 25, 2006, as an insert inside the DVD release of Halloween: 25 Years of Terror, Hutchinson released Halloween: Autopsis. Written by Hutchinson, and artwork by Marcus Smith and Nick Dismas, the story is about a photographer assigned to take pictures of Michael Myers. As the photographer, Carter, follows Dr. Loomis he begins to take on Loomis's obsession himself, until finally meeting Michael Myers in person, which results in his death.

A lot of readers found in the comic books what they had been missing from the films in the later sequels. Our books are very faithful to the source material, and by that we mean the original film itself. In our stories, Michael Myers is very much again "The Shape" — the undefined bogeyman of 1978, rather than the family killer of the 80s and 90s.

— Stefan Hutchinson on the fan support of his Halloween comic book series.

Rob Zombie's reboot of the film series ensured that any Halloween comics would not be contradicted by upcoming films, allowing Hutchinson creative freedom. Malek Akkad was approached by Devil's Due Publishing with the possibility of producing a line of Halloween comics, and he and Hutchinson worked to make them a reality. Hutchinson was convinced by the strong support of One Good Scare that the comic books would have an audience. In 2008, Stefan Hutchinson released the first issue of his new comic book, Halloween: Nightdance. This is a four-issue miniseries, and it does not contain any characters—other than Michael—from the films. The four issues are titled, "A Shape in the Void", "The Silent Clown", "A Rainbow in One Color", and "When the Stars Came Crashing Down". The first issue, "A Shape in the Void", takes place on October 31, 2000, so that it falls between Halloween H20 and Halloween: Resurrection. Issue one follows Michael as he stalks Lisa, an eighteen-year-old girl with insecurities and "a chronic fear of darkness". Hutchinson explains that Nightdance was an attempt to escape the dense continuity of the film series and recreate the tone of the 1978 film. Michael becomes inexplicably fixated on Lisa, just as he did with Laurie in the original Halloween, before the sequels established that a sibling bond was actually his motivation for stalking her. The aim was to once again establish Michael Myers as a "credible and dangerous force".

August 2008 saw the release of Devil's Due's Halloween: 30 Years of Terror to celebrate the thirtieth anniversary of Halloween. This comic book one-shot is a collection of short stories inspired by John Carpenter's original. "Trick or Treat" features the MacKenzies, unseen characters from the first film who Tommy and Lindsey run to for help. "P.O.V." shows a murder from the point of view of both Michael and his victim, "Visiting Hours" sees Laurie Strode reflecting on how her life could have been had her brother never found her in 1978, while "Tommy and the Boogeyman" reveals that Tommy Doyle grew up to write comic books featuring Michael Myers. In the final story, "Repetition Compulsion", Dr. Loomis tries to predict where Michael will strike next on Halloween 1989. Writer Hutchinson explains that H30 came about because, unlike previous decades, there was no Halloween film coming out in 2008 to acknowledge the occasion.

Devil's Due released the three-issue miniseries Halloween: The First Death of Laurie Strode in late 2008. Written by Hutchinson with artwork from Jeff Zornow, the story bridges the gap between Halloween II and Halloween H20 by focusing on Laurie Strode in the aftermath of the 1978 murders. Hutchinson explains that Laurie is "trying to get better and trying to repair, but where do you even start after going through such horror? How do you even try to resume normality when you don't know what that is anymore?" Although Michael appears in the series, it is not clear whether he is real or if the traumatised Laurie is seeing things. Hutchinson is not a fan of the revelation that Laurie and Michael are siblings and took steps to address that problem in the story. He wanted to avoid the "bloodline plot of the middle sequels", which he felt demystified the character of the Shape, and approach the story so that "it becomes almost incidental that she's his sister". Hutchinson believed that Laurie Strode's evolution into Keri Tate was fertile ground for a storyline; he says, "it's not the faking of the death that's interesting at all, but it's the fall that leads to that happening. The faked death is just simple mechanics and can be covered in a sentence, but the state of mind and events leading to that are full of rich character and dramatic potential."

==== Online stories ====
All of Stefan Hutchinson's Halloween comic books take place in the Halloween H20 timeline, which retconned Halloween 4–6 from continuity. Hutchinson comments that, while the retcon was unpopular with "a lot of fans" for ignoring previous movies, he preferred the "simplicity of this storyline, over the needlessly convoluted mythology that the last three films had created". However, he admits that one of the downsides of the H20 timeline is that fans do not know exactly what happened to Dr. Sam Loomis after Halloween II. To remedy this, Hutchinson pitched Halloween: Sam as a way of paying tribute to the character. Written by Hutchinson and featuring illustrations from Autopsis' Marcus Smith, Sam is a prose short story available exclusively for download at the website HalloweenComics.com. It explores the life of Dr. Loomis, including his backstory and relationship with Elizabeth Worthington, a journalist he met during World War II. In 1995, Michael Myers visits the ailing Dr. Loomis in a hospital and murders Elizabeth in front of him. Loomis attempts to stop him, but dies of a coronary failure.

=== Video games ===
In 1983, Wizard Video, who had also released a video game version of The Texas Chain Saw Massacre, released a Halloween game for the Atari 2600. In the game, the player is a babysitter who has to protect her children from Michael Myers, who has managed to get inside the house. Although the game is called Halloween, and features the film's theatrical poster as its cover art as well as the movie's main music theme, the game itself never refers to any characters, including the killer, by their names in the film.

In January 2014, as part of the Call of Duty: Ghosts Onslaught DLC, Myers became a one-time event playable character on the multiplayer map Fog. On October 25, 2016, Michael Myers and Laurie Strode became playable characters and Haddonfield became a map in the online horror game Dead by Daylight, As of January 2026, they are no longer available for purchase ingame nor can Haddonfield be played on anymore. On October 25, 2023, Michael Myers was added as an outfit in the online shooter Fortnite.

In August 2024, two new video games from Boss Team Games were revealed to be in development including Halloween and RetroRealms: Halloween.

In September 2024, Michael Myers appeared in The Haunting halloween event in Call of Duty: Modern Warfare III.

RetroRealms: Halloween was released on October 18, 2024 for the Nintendo Switch, PlayStation 4, PlayStation 5, Windows, Xbox One, and Xbox Series X/S.

Halloween: The Game, developed by IllFonic and co-published by IllFonic Publishing and Gun Interactive, was announced in August 2025. The game is based on the 1978 film and includes single-player and multiplayer modes, including an asymmetrical multiplayer mode in which one player controls Michael Myers while four players control Haddonfield civilians. The game was released September 8, 2026, for PlayStation 5, Windows, and Xbox Series X and Series S.

=== Merchandise ===
Halloween has also seen profitability through various merchandise like toys, dolls, statues, model kits, bobbleheads, snow globes, movie posters, masks, T-shirts, hats, and more. Michael Myers has made appearances in the form of dolls and toys from McFarlane Toys, Mezco Toyz, Sideshow Collectibles and National Entertainment Collectibles Association (NECA). Even Dr. Loomis has been immortalized in plastic alongside Michael Myers in a two-figure set produced by NECA.

The Michael Myers mask has been reproduced over the years by Don Post, the mask company responsible for the creation of the masks from several of the Halloween films (the Silver Shamrock novelty factory seen in Halloween III was actually shot on location in one of Don Post's factories). While Don Post reproductions of the Michael Myers mask are still commonly found in costume stores every Halloween, the license to produce Michael Myers masks has since been given to Cinema Secrets, the company commissioned with the creation of the Michael Myers mask for Halloween: Resurrection. As of 2012, Universal Pictures has granted license to Trick or Treat Studios to produce two versions of the Michael Myers mask from Halloween II, one "clean" version and one with the famous "blood tears".

Many versions of the original Halloween as well as several of its sequels have been released on DVD and Blu-ray by Anchor Bay Entertainment, Universal Pictures and Dimension Films. In December 2007, there were reports that the Producer's Cut of Halloween: The Curse of Michael Myers might get a DVD release in the future.

Following the first Blu-ray release of the original Halloween, all other films in the series were subsequently released to Blu-ray, as well. Home video distributors Anchor Bay Entertainment and Scream Factory released Halloween: The Complete Collection to Blu-ray on September 23, 2014. This box set brings together all ten Halloween films released to date. Two versions of The Complete Collection were released: a standard 10-disc set featuring the first eight original films of the series and Rob Zombie's 2007 and 2009 remakes, and a "Limited Edition" 15-disc set, containing the ten films on ten discs, and five extra discs featuring the television versions of Halloween and Halloween II, the never-before released Halloween 6: The Producer's Cut, a bonus disc to Rob Zombie's Halloween, and a bonus disc containing all-new special features from all ten films. The box set won the 2015 Saturn Award for Best DVD/BD Collection Release.

=== Fan film ===
On October 22, 2026, filmmaker Jason Eisener released a short film titled Project Shamrock: The Secret Origins of Michael Myers Exposed. The short film attempts to tie the first two Halloween films, the unrelated third movie, and the Thorn Trilogy into one cohesive explanation. The short depicts a janitor, played by David Brunt, revealing to two men that Shamrock Industries has been experimenting on children for years. The clown mask that Michael wore is shown to have been a Shamrock product and influenced him to kill his family. It quickly becomes apparent that the men interviewing him are from the Thorn cult and promptly kill him using one of the masks.

== See also ==
- List of films set around Halloween
