= Absence of the Good =

1999 film

- Written by: James Reid
- Screenplay by: David Golden
- Directed by: John Flynn
- Starring: Stephen Baldwin; Tyne Daly
- Music by: Richard Marvin
- Country of origin: United States
- Original language: English

Production
- Producers: David Bixler; Jeff Ivers; Kevin M. Kallberg; Brad Krevoy
- Cinematography: Ric Waite
- Editor: Barry Zetlin
- Running time: 95 minutes

Original release
- Network: syndication
- Release: October 15, 1999

Absence of the Good is a 1999 American made-for-television thriller film starring Stephen Baldwin and directed by John Flynn.

== Cast ==
- Stephen Baldwin as Caleb Barnes
- Tyne Daly as Dr. Marcia Lyons
- Elizabeth Barondes as Bailey
- Brian Lee Bouck as Joe Marshall
- Jenniffer Buckalew as Sheila Gaskin
- Roger Callard as Evans
- Dalin Christiansen as Mr. Gummer
- Neblis Francois as Young Uniform
- Andrew Fugate as Michael Barnes
- Allen Garfield as Lieutenant Paul Taylor
- Frank Gerrish as Roger
- Shawn Huff as Mary Barnes
- Rob Joseph as SWAT Officer
- Robert Joseph as SWAT Officer
- Robert Knepper as Glenn Dwyer
- Janice Knickrehm as Agnes Thurmond
- Cecile Krevoy as Receptionist
- Britt Leary as Lynette Gummer
- Tamie Logan as Tracy
- James Maitland as Detective Garcia
- Cathleen Mason as Mrs. Gummer
- Giselle Miller as Andy Wendt
- Silas Weir Mitchell as Jack Gaskin
- Joey Miyashima as Childress
- Steve O'Neill as Detective Sloan
- Rosalie Richards as Mrs. Kogen
- Robby Robinson as Clerk
- Dennis Saylor as Reverend Steve
- George Sullivan as Sheriff Burnett
- Hillary J. Walker as Office Assistant
- Alex Warren as Julie / Sarah Quinn
- Michelle Wright as Detective
- Jimmy Miklavcic as Sheriff's Deputy (uncredited)
