= George P. Wilbur =

American actor (1941–2023)

George Wilbur
- Born: George Peter Wilbur; March 6, 1941; Kent, Connecticut, U.S.
- Died: February 1, 2023 (aged 81)
- Occupations: Stunt performer; Stunt coordinator; Actor
- Years active: 1966–2023

George Peter Wilbur (March 6, 1941 – February 1, 2023) was an American stuntman and actor, best known for playing Michael Myers in both Halloween 4: The Return of Michael Myers and Halloween: The Curse of Michael Myers.

== Early life ==
Wilbur was born in Connecticut and served in the U.S. Navy. He worked as a wrangler on a ranch in Tucson, Arizona, where he worked as an extra in the 1966 film El Dorado and was recruited as a stand-in performer for John Wayne. Wilbur later moved to California, where he worked as an extra and stunt double.

== Career ==
Wilbur's career as a stuntman lasted for 40 years and involved over 100 television and film projects. He notably doubled for Peter Graves on Mission: Impossible, Joe Don Baker in Framed (1975), Jack Palance in Cops & Robbersons (1994), Craig T. Nelson on The District, and James Garner in The Notebook (2004). He was the stunt coordinator of Murphy's Romance (1985), Poltergeist II: The Other Side (1986), and Me and the Kid (1993), among others.

Wilbur's played Michael Myers in Halloween 4: The Return of Michael Myers and Halloween: The Curse of Michael Myers. Wilbur was credited as a stunt performer in Halloween 5: The Revenge of Michael Myers, another Halloween sequel, although not in the role of Michael Myers as actor and stuntman Don Shanks played the role.

Wilbur was a member of the Hollywood Stuntmen's Hall of Fame.

== Death ==
George P. Wilbur died on February 1, 2023, at the age of 81.

== In popular culture ==
Wilbur was notably referenced in Season 10, Episode 13 of the animated television series Family Guy ("Tom Tucker: The Man and His Dream"), fictionalized as the stage name of character Tom Tucker earlier in his career. In the same episode, archive footage of Halloween 4 featuring Wilbur as the titular character is played, with Seth MacFarlane voicing over the scene as Tucker.

== Filmography ==
=== Acting roles ===
==== Film ====
Year	Title	Role	Notes
1971	Escape from the Planet of the Apes	Boxer	Uncredited
1972	Hammer	Brady	
1976	Death Journey	Thug	
1978	Movie Movie	Tony Norton	
1978	Every Which Way but Loose	Church	
1979	Parts: The Clonus Horror	Walker Man	
1980	Coast to Coast	Billy Ray	
1981	Pennies from Heaven	Motorcycle Police Officer	
1983	Max Dugan Returns	Man in Car	
1984	Firestarter	DSI Orderly	
1986	Raw Deal	Killer #1	
1987	The Running Man	Lieutenant Saunders	
1988	Split Decisions	Referee at Patty Flood	
1988	Remote Control	Dockman	
1988	Halloween 4: The Return of Michael Myers	Michael Myers	
1989	Ghostbusters II	Bailiff	
1989	Halloween 5: The Revenge of Michael Myers	Michael Myers	Archive footage
1990	Loose Cannons	Grimmer's Man	
1990	Come See the Paradise	Theatre Man #1	
1991	Eve of Destruction	Trooper	
1991	Defenseless	Sherman Bodeck	
1994	Cobb	Casino Security Man	
1995	Halloween: The Curse of Michael Myers	Michael Myers	
2014	American Muscle	Prison Clerk	

==== Television ====
Year	Title	Role	Notes
1970–73	Mission: Impossible	Various roles	4 episodes
1973	Search	Mull	Episode: "Ends of the Earth"
1975	Dead Man on the Run	Benet	Television film
1977	Switch	Mullins	Episode: "Two on the Run"
1978	The Six Million Dollar Man	2nd Man	Episode: "Dead Ringer"
1978	Pearl	Marine Sergeant	3 episodes
1979	Silent Victory: The Kitty O'Neil Story	Bank Clerk	Television film
1979	Goldie and the Boxer	Wilson	Television film
1981	Hardcase	Wolfgang	Television film
1983	The Fighter	Fighter	Television film
1983, 1985	Simon & Simon	Kaydon's Hood, Thug	2 episodes
1984	The Master	Thug	2 episodes
1984	Mickey Spillane's Mike Hammer	Thug	2 episodes
1985	Hardcastle and McCormick	Thug #2	Episode: "Angie's Choice"
1986	Magnum, P.I.	Henchman #1	Episode: "Straight and Narrow"
1989	Dynasty	Security Guard	Episode: "Virginia Reels"
1991	Fatal Exposure	Fisherman	Television film
1991	Cast a Deadly Spell	Owl Wagon Cook	Television film
1992	Days of Our Lives	Ike	Episode #1.6926
1993	Renegade	Gunman #1	Episode: "Headcase"
2012	Family Guy	Michael Myers	Episode: "Tom Tucker: The Man and His Dream"; Archive footage from Halloween 4: The Return of Michael Myers

==== Video games ====
Year	Title	Role
1993	Ground Zero: Texas	Border Patrolman
2021	Ground Zero Texas: Nuclear Edition	Border Patrolman
