= Halloween: The Curse of Michael Myers =

1995 film by Joe Chappelle

- Theatrical release poster
- Directed by: Joe Chappelle
- Written by: Daniel Farrands
- Based on: Characters by John Carpenter and Debra Hill
- Produced by: Paul Freeman
- Starring: Donald Pleasence; Paul Rudd; Marianne Hagan; Mitch Ryan
- Cinematography: Billy Dickson
- Edited by: Randolph K. Bricker
- Music by: Alan Howarth
- Production companies: Nightfall Productions; Trancas International; Halloween VI Productions
- Distributed by: Dimension Films
- Release date: September 29, 1995
- Running time: 88 minutes
- Country: United States
- Language: English
- Budget: $5 million
- Box office: $15.1 million (U.S.)

Halloween: The Curse of Michael Myers (Note: The Producer's Cut uses the on-screen title Halloween 6: The Curse of Michael Myers, and originally titled Halloween 666: The Origin of Michael Myers.) is a 1995 American slasher film directed by Joe Chappelle, written by Daniel Farrands, and starring Donald Pleasence, Paul Rudd, Marianne Hagan, and Mitch Ryan. The sequel to Halloween 5: The Revenge of Michael Myers and the sixth installment in the Halloween film series, the plot depicts Michael Myers hunting down the infant son of his niece, Jamie Lloyd. It expands significantly upon the supernatural horror elements that were sparsely introduced in the previous film, mainly the subplot of a cult that controls Myers and drives him to murder his bloodline using the ancient Celtic rune of Thorn. It marks the final appearance of Pleasence as Dr. Sam Loomis before his death, as well as the feature film debut of Rudd, who portrays an adult Tommy Doyle from the original Halloween (1978). This also marks the last major role of George P. Wilbur before his death in 2023.

Halloween: The Curse of Michael Myers had a protracted development that spanned several years, comprising numerous revisions, drafts, and contributions from different screenwriters, including Daniel Farrands and Scott Rosenberg. Farrands ultimately completed the final version of the screenplay shortly before filming began in Salt Lake City in the fall of 1994. The film also had a troubled post-production: its original cut performed poorly with test audiences, leading to the film undergoing a series of reshoots and edits. The finished film was distributed by Dimension Films, who would go on to distribute the rest of the series until 2009's Halloween II. Pleasence died on February 2, 1995, seven months before the film was released. The film was dedicated to his memory.

Halloween: The Curse of Michael Myers was released on September 29, 1995, grossing $15.1 million at the domestic box office on a budget of $5 million. It was lambasted by critics, with criticism focused on its weak story, ending, Rudd's performance, and the origin story given to Michael Myers, though Pleasence's performance and the look of Michael Myers were better received. After the film's home media release, the original workprint of the film, which featured 45 minutes of alternative footage and a different ending, was discovered by fans of the series. This version, dubbed the Producer's Cut, developed a cult following, with bootleg DVD copies sold on eBay and online petitions targeting for an official release of it. In September 2014, the Producer's Cut received its first official home media release by Scream Factory as part of a Blu-ray box set of the Halloween series.

Halloween: The Curse of Michael Myers was followed by Halloween H20: 20 Years Later in 1998, which does not contain any references to the Jamie Lloyd storyline of the prior three films (although they were featured in the original script and comic book tie-ins published by Chaos! Comics), instead serving as a direct sequel to Halloween II (1981).

== Plot ==
Six years after escaping Haddonfield's police station, (Note: As depicted in Halloween 5: The Revenge of Michael Myers (1989)) Michael Myers and his niece Jamie Lloyd have been abducted by the Man in Black and his Druid-like cult at an unknown facility with medical staff. By Halloween Eve, a now fifteen-year-old Jamie has been impregnated and gives birth. With a help of a nurse, who soon becomes Michael's first victim, she escapes with her baby in a stolen pickup truck with Michael in pursuit.

Meanwhile, a now retired Dr. Loomis is visited by his friend Dr. Terence Wynn, the chief administrator of Smith's Grove Sanitarium, where Michael had been incarcerated as a boy. As Wynn asks Loomis to return to Smith's Grove, they overhear Jamie's plea for help on a local radio station. Michael catches up with Jamie and kills her, only to find that she has hidden her child elsewhere.

In Haddonfield, the old Myers house is now owned by relatives of Laurie Strode's adoptive family: John and Debra Strode, their adult children Kara and Tim, and Kara's six-year-old son Danny, who is tormented by visions of the Man in Black telling him to kill. At the Blankenship boarding house across the street lives Tommy Doyle, the boy Laurie babysat in 1978, (Note: As depicted in Halloween (1978)) now a recluse obsessed with Michael's motives. Also hearing Jamie's cry for help, Tommy tracks the call down to a bus station and finds the baby, whom he names Steven. Tommy crosses paths with Loomis, who visits Debra to warn her. After Loomis leaves, Michael kills Debra with an axe.

Tommy locates Kara and Danny and takes them to safety at the boarding house. He tells Kara that he believes Michael is under the influence of Thorn, an ancient Druid curse that drives a person to kill their family on Halloween, and that Steven will be his final sacrifice. Tommy then leaves to meet Loomis at the local harvest festival. Michael electrocutes John in his home before going to the harvest festival and killing shock jock Barry Simms, after which he follows Kara's brother Tim and his girlfriend Beth back to the house.

Meanwhile, Mrs. Blankenship recounts the history of Halloween to Danny and tells Kara she was babysitting Michael the night he killed his sister in which he heard a voice telling him to do so. Mrs. Blankenship also states how Danny hears the same voice, implying that Danny is to follow down the same path. The Man in Black beckons Danny to the Myers house. Kara rescues Danny, discovering the corpses of Tim, Beth, and Debra upstairs, and is pursued by Michael. Upon returning to the boarding house, they discover the Man in Black to be Dr. Wynn. Cult members burst in and, with the help of Mrs. Blankenship, abduct Kara, Danny, and Steven and take them to Smith's Grove. Kara is locked in a maximum-security ward while the boys are kept in an operating room.

Tommy and Loomis go to the sanitarium where Loomis confronts Wynn, who insinuates that the Smith's Grove staff have been studying pure evil to learn how to control it; Steven is implied to be the successful result of this conspiracy. Wynn wants Loomis to join him, as he was the first to recognize the power of Michael's evil. Loomis refuses and is knocked out by a doctor. Meanwhile, Tommy frees Kara as Michael pursues them through the sanitarium. They watch as Wynn and his team prepare for a surgical procedure before Michael suddenly appears and turns against the cult, killing them all.

Tommy and Kara rescue the kids as Michael chases them into a laboratory containing fetuses from Wynn's failed experiments to clone Michael's DNA. Tommy injects Michael with corrosive liquid and beats him unconscious with a lead pipe. Tommy, Kara, and the children leave Smith's Grove while Loomis stays behind, stating he has "a little business to attend to here". Inside, Michael's mask lies alone on the lab floor as Loomis screams in the background, leaving their fates unknown.

== Cast ==
- Donald Pleasence as Dr. Sam Loomis
- Paul Rudd as Tommy Doyle
- Marianne Hagan as Kara Strode
- Mitch Ryan as Dr. Terence Wynn
- Devin Gardner as Danny Strode
- Mariah O'Brien as Beth
- Keith Bogart as Tim Strode
- Kim Darby as Debra Strode
- Bradford English as John Strode
- Leo Geter as Barry Simms
- Susan Swift as Nurse Mary
- George P. Wilbur as Michael Myers
- Janice Knickrehm as Mrs. Blankenship
- Alan Echeverria as Dr. Bonham
- Hildur Ruriks as Dawn
- Sheri Hicks as Paramedic
- Tom Proctor as Motorist
- Bryan Morris as Attendant
- Lee Ju Chew as Nurse
- Raquelle Anderson as Ballerina
- Kristine Summers as College Coed
- Elyse Donalson as Lunatic
- A. Michael Lerner as Additional Shape
- Jimmy Chunga as Drunk College Student
- Brad Hardin as The Shape - Second Unit additional photography
- Fred Lerner as Smith's Grove Doctor
- James Woodson as Deputy
- J. C. Brandy as Jamie Lloyd
  - Danielle Harris as young Jamie Lloyd (archive footage, The Producer's Cut only)

== Production ==
=== Development and screenplay ===
==== Early drafts ====
The Runic symbol of Thorn, which is a major theme in the film.

After an unfavorable critical and commercial response to Halloween 5: The Revenge of Michael Myers which came out only a year after Halloween 4: The Return of Michael Myers, producer Moustapha Akkad put the Halloween series on hold to re-evaluate its potential. Akkad felt Halloween 5 had strayed too far from Halloween 4 and the box office response was much lower than expected. As early as 1990, both Danielle Harris and Don Shanks were expected to return as Jamie Lloyd and The Shape, with the possibility of Donald Pleasence and Wendy Kaplan reprising their roles as well. That same year, screenwriter and long-time Halloween fan Daniel Farrands set out to write the sixth entry in the Halloween series. Farrands gave his horror film scripts to the producer of Halloween 5, Ramsey Thomas; impressed by his writing, Thomas set a meeting for Farrands with executive producer Moustapha Akkad.

Farrands, who knew the films, as well as Dennis Etchison's novelizations intimately, constructed a bible of the entire franchise and presented it to the studio. The film lingered in development as a planned October 1990 release was missed, but Akkad persisted and began courting Michele Soavi in 1992. Soavi would reject the offer and not long after the producers entered a series of complicated legal battles which delayed plans for a sequel; eventually Miramax Films (via its Dimension Films division) bought the rights to the Halloween series. Concurrently with the legal battle, series co-creator John Carpenter had teamed up with New Line Cinema to outbid Miramax. Carpenter's proposal saw the film take place on a space station.

Following Miramax's acquisition of the series, the studio hoped to start production by October 1993, but again, this did not materialize. Bob Weinstein subsequently hired Gary Fleder to direct, with Phil Rosenberg becoming the first writer hired for the project. Rosenberg's screenplay, titled Halloween 666: The Origin, follows a Chicago news reporter who arrives in Haddonfield to cover the town's first Halloween celebration in five years, during which a series of killings begins. Akkad expressly disliked the screenplay, but Miramax responded to it favorably and opted to continue moving forward until Fleder eventually dropped out, citing "creative differences".

Miramax then approached Quentin Tarantino, who had recently completed Pulp Fiction (1994) for the studio. Though a screenplay was never completed, Tarantino pitched a story idea involving Michael Myers and the Man in Black fleeing Haddonfield together and going on a road trip down Route 66 while murdering people, events which bear resemblance to those depicted in his screenplay for Natural Born Killers, which he was pitching to Miramax Films at the same time. Tarantino ultimately declined the offer, but suggested Evil Dead II co-writer Scott Spiegel as a potential director. Spiegel was unenthusiastic about Phil Rosenberg's screenplay and ultimately departed the project.

By April 1994, Phil Rosenberg's brother, Scott was tasked with revising the script, but failed to satisfy Akkad. With Scott Rosenberg's draft rejected, the studio pursued upcoming writers Irving Belateche and Lawrence Guterman to completely overhaul Halloween 666. With an October 1994 release window instilled by Weinstein, Matthew Patrick of Hider in the House was selected as director. Upon his hiring, Patrick immediately flew to Salt Lake City for location scouting and brought in his frequent cinematographer Billy Dickson. However, neither Patrick or Akkad were appeased by the script, with the former even referring to it as "unfinished". Patrick was granted his own revision of the script, but tensions rose between Akkad and Weinstein. With production gearing up to begin in two weeks without a finalized cast, Patrick ultimately quit the project in May 1994.

==== Farrands' re-drafting ====
In June 1994, Daniel Farrands was hired to write a new screenplay, as the film had an impending shooting date scheduled for that October in Salt Lake City. At this time, Fred Walton was attached to direct. Walton soon became reluctant to take on a "movie about a guy with a knife killing people". Instead, the filmmaker envisioned a plot akin to Friday the 13th: A New Beginning, with Jamie Lloyd living in a halfway house and committing suicide in the film's opening scene. The Weinsteins swiftly moved onto Joe Chappelle after being impressed with his debut film, Thieves Quartet. Farrands expanded on the presence of the "Man in Black" in Halloween 5 as well as the appearance of the Thorn symbol, both of which appear without explanation at the end of Halloween 5. When beginning the script, Farrands contacted the writers of Halloween 4 and 5 for additional information, but they were unable to provide clear answers, leaving him to "pick up the pieces".

Farrands himself envisioned the Michael Myers character as a "sexual deviant", theorizing that, as a child, Michael became fixated on the murder of his sister Judith, and for his own twisted reasons felt the need to repeat that action over and over again, finding a sister-like figure in Laurie who excited him sexually. He also theorized that by making Laurie the literal sister of Michael, the sequels took away from the simplicity and relatability of the original Halloween. Nevertheless, when writing Halloween: The Curse of Michael Myers, Farrands was tasked with creating a mythology for Myers which defined his motives and why he could not be killed. He says, "He can't just be a man anymore, he's gone beyond that. He's mythical. He's supernatural. So, I took it from that standpoint that there's something else driving him. A force that goes beyond that five senses that has infected this boy's soul and now is driving him." As the script developed and more people became involved, Farrands admits that the film went too far in explaining Myers and that he himself was not completely satisfied with the finished product.

Farrands expanded the "Curse of Thorn" plot line, in which Jamie Lloyd is kidnapped by a covert cult who has cursed Michael Myers via the Runic symbol of Thorn, which compels him to kill and also affords him immortality. Farrands had in part based the idea on dialogue present in Halloween II (1981) about the night of Samhain, during which the "veil between the living and the dead is thinnest", the one time of the year during which Myers became "active, and seeks out his bloodline". References to Druidism as well as Myers's grandfather "hearing voices" had also appeared in the 1978 novelization of Halloween by Curtis Richards. While the character of Jamie Lloyd dies early in the film, the initial versions of Farrands' script had her character surviving until the final act, at which point she was ultimately killed by Michael. Other elements of Farrands' working script that ultimately had to be trimmed down included an extension of the Curse of Thorn subplot, which had the entire town of Haddonfield in collusion with the cult, an idea Akkad wanted to use for the series' seventh installment. However, this idea was scrapped in favor of the Halloween H20 script in 1997.

According to Farrands, there were around ten different drafts of his script between June and the October 1994 film shoot, and much of the finale that appears in the theatrical version (including the events at the hospital, as well as the references to the cult using Myers's power as a means of scientific investigation), was not written by him, and had been written and shot in post-production under the supervision of Dimension Films.

==== Allusions and references ====
Farrands, a long-time fan of the series, sought to incorporate various references and allusions to the previous Halloween films, particularly the original, to play with the "Halloween mythology". These range from situational allusions, such as Tommy Doyle living across the street from the Strode house (a play on the events in the original Halloween, which take place between the Wallace and Doyle residences, which are across the street from one another) to minor references, such as the naming of an address from Halloween II (1981), and the character of Mrs. Blankenship, a name referred to in passing in Halloween III: Season of the Witch (1982). Other references outside the narrative diegeses of the series include the names of characters, such as John and Debra Strode (referencing John Carpenter and Debra Hill), as well as the naming of Danny Strode, a character Farrands has said was modeled after Danny Torrance in The Shining (1980).

Farrands also referenced Carpenter's The Fog (1980) with the line referring to a "stomach pounder" (a protein milkshake Tim drinks early in the film), and Beth's murder scene was modeled after a scene from Walton's When a Stranger Calls (1979) (Farrands wrote the scene upon hearing that Walton had been attached to direct the project, though Walton would eventually drop out of the production). Additionally, extended scenes of Kara walking on the college campus and en route to her home were intended to allude to scenes featuring Laurie Strode in the first film, while Danny dropping his pumpkin while walking home alludes to a scene in the first film in which a group of bullies force Tommy to drop his pumpkin outside the elementary school.

=== Casting ===
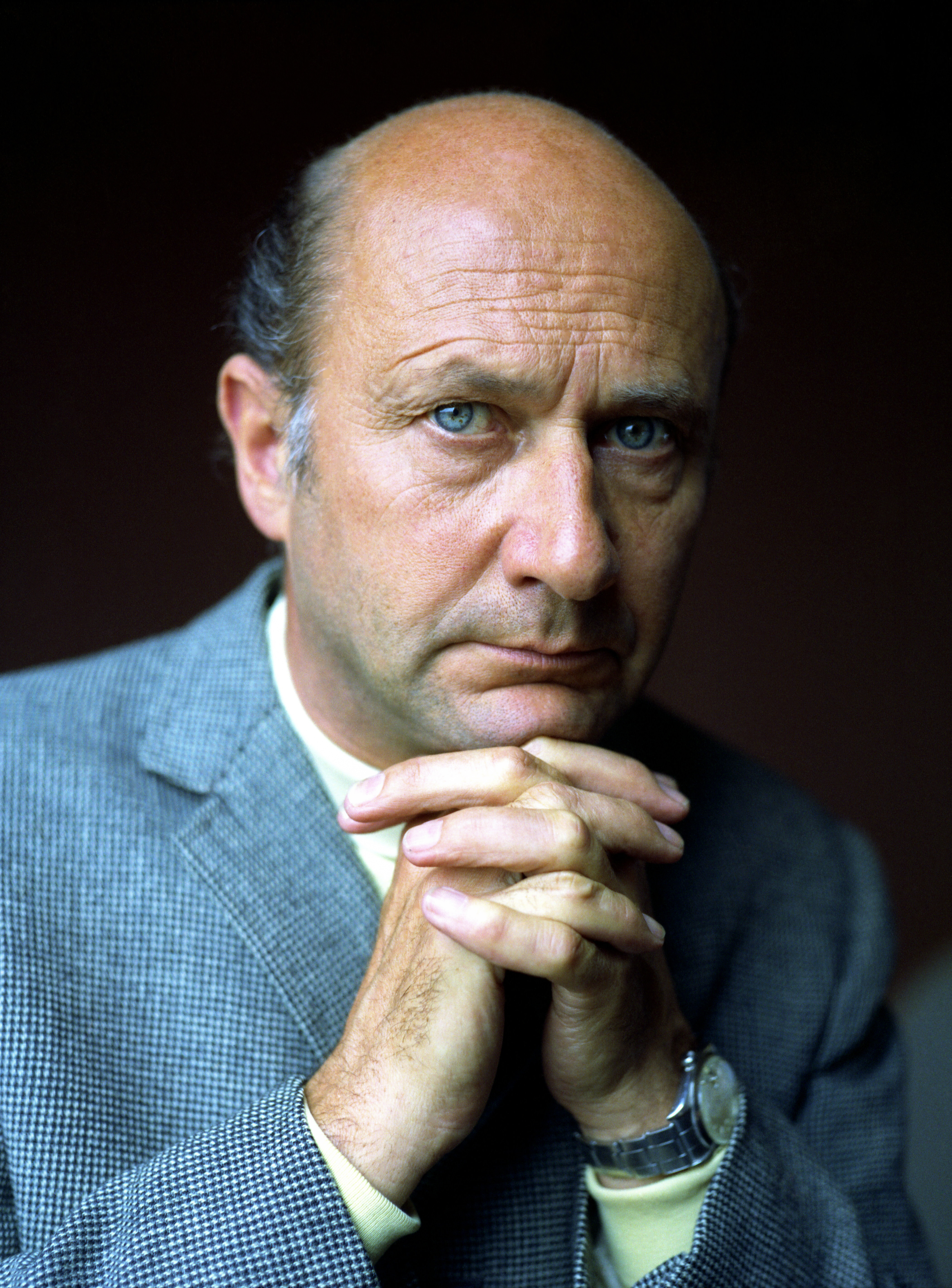
Donald Pleasence reprised his role as Dr. Loomis, in what would be one of his final film appearances.

Pleasence returned to play Samuel Loomis, in what would be one of his final film performances; according to Farrands, Pleasence was fond of the script. Danielle Harris, who was seventeen at the time, contacted producer Paul Freeman about reprising her role as Jamie Lloyd, and went so far as completing paperwork to become legally emancipated in order to shoot the film. She was officially cast in the role, but Dimension Films could not come to an agreement over her salary; Harris alleges that Dimension offered her a scaled $1,000 to shoot the part over the course of a week, which was less than the amount of money she had paid for her emancipation. Farrands and Freeman both had wanted Harris for the part, but at that point "had their hands tied".

According to Harris, the head of the casting department refused to negotiate her salary, stating that she was a "scale character who dies in the first twenty minutes". This ultimately led to her dropping out of the project. "People automatically assume I wanted some crazy amount of money, or something," Harris commented in 2014, "[but] it's not like I [was] demanding of anything, really ... When you've been asked to do something and then they insult you by saying, "You're a piece of shit, you die in the first act—I don't give a fuck that you were in two other Halloween movies, who cares?"... I was in shock." Actress J. C. Brandy was cast as Harris's replacement.

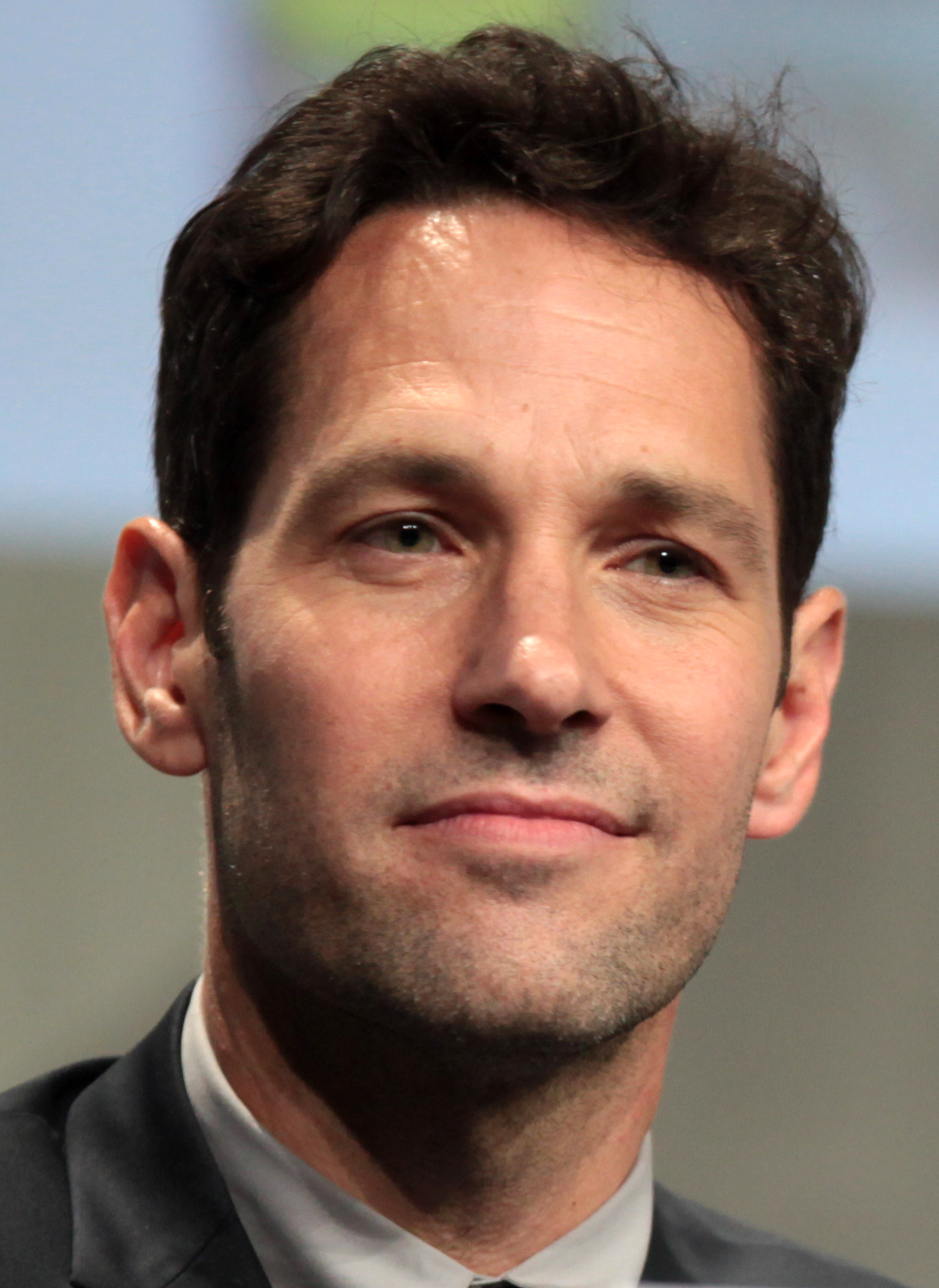
The adult Tommy Doyle was portrayed by Paul Rudd, marking one of his first major film appearances.

The producers initially wanted Brian Andrews to reprise his role as Tommy. However, with Andrews not having an agent, they were unable to contact him. Paul Stephen Rudd was cast in the part of Tommy, which marked his first starring role before he appeared in Clueless (1995). The leading female role, Kara, was given to Marianne Hagan; however, Hagan has since stated that Miramax executives Bob and Harvey Weinstein did not favor her for the part, and made aesthetic criticisms about her being "too thin" and her chin being "too pointy". Farrands, however, had wanted Hagan for the part because he felt she possessed an "every-girl" quality of having "lived a little, and had a hard time", and likened her screen presence to that of Jamie Lee Curtis. According to Hagan, she and Rudd both signed letters of intent upon their casting, agreeing to appear in a pending sequel to the film for the Weinsteins: "We thought, 'Why are they making us do this? We don't know where we are going to be two or three years from now. And who says we're even going to want to do it?'"

The filmmakers also approached Howard Stern to make a cameo appearance as the radio DJ Barry Sims, but he declined in order to appear in Private Parts. Instead, Leo Geter was cast in the role of Simms.

For the role of Dr. Terence Wynn, Mitch Ryan was cast, based on his performance in Lethal Weapon (1987); Farrands originally urged the producers to cast Christopher Lee, having had the veteran horror actor in mind when writing the character. This is a reference on Carpenter's initial choice for the role of Dr. Loomis during the making of Halloween from 1978 where Lee was offered that role, but declined due to low pay, only to regret it in later years. Denise Richards also auditioned for the part of Beth, but the studio passed on her, giving the role to Mariah O'Brien. Stunt performer George P. Wilbur, who portrayed Michael Myers in the fourth installment, reprised his role as Myers. However, once reshoots took place, Wilbur was replaced by A. Michael Lerner as director Joe Chappelle found Wilbur to be "too bulky".

=== Filming ===
Filming began on October 31, 1994 in Salt Lake City, Utah. Within the first week of shooting, however, the city experienced an early winter snowstorm, which complicated the production. As a result, several scenes which were supposed to take place on exterior locations had to be transferred to interiors. The original hospital scenes were shot at the abandoned Old Primary Children's Hospital in The Avenues section of Salt Lake City.

Special effects artist John Carl Buechler created the mask for the film, which was based heavily on the mask featured in the poster for Halloween 4: The Return of Michael Myers. Buechler hand-crafted the mask over actor George P. Wilbur's face.

Producer Paul Freeman and director Chappelle reportedly rewrote the ending on-set, even from shot-to-shot as production deadlines loomed. Freeman also sent the crew home when crucial scenes needed to be shot; deleted scripted scenes indiscriminately; rewrote dialogue and action sequences; and assumed the responsibility of directing second-unit shots and the supervision of post-production of the original cut. These complications resulted in Dimension Films' parent company (and the film's co-production company) Miramax, taking over the film's production, and ordering many of the reworked sequences to be reshot.

Associated producer Malek Akkad explained the film's lack of a cohesive "vision" being the result of director Chappelle "answering" to the visions of the distributor, Dimension Films; Moustapha Akkad's production company, Nightfall Productions; and writer Daniel Farrands. Tensions between what Dimension, Nightfall, and Farrands envisioned for the film resulted in a finished product that had needed "more forethought", according to Akkad.

=== Post-production ===
In early 1995, after filming and editing was completed, Halloween: The Curse of Michael Myers was given a test screening in New York City which, as described by actress Marianne Hagan, "consisted primarily of fourteen-year-old boys". During the Q&A afterward, one of the audience members expressed great displeasure at the ending of the film, which entailed a Celtic ritual and the passing on of the "Curse of Thorn" to Loomis. Fangoria published an unfavorable review of the film by an intern who attended the test screening, which landed the magazine in "some hot water" with the Weinsteins.

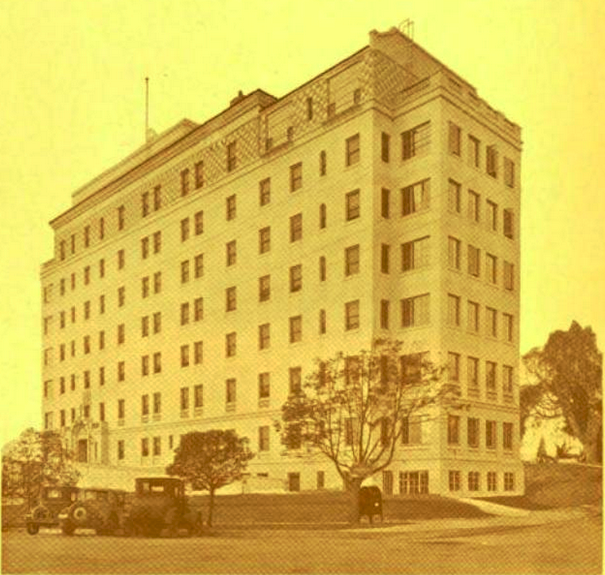
Re-shoots occurred in the historic Queen of Angels Hospital in Los Angeles

As a result of the audience's disapproval toward the film's finale, the film was rushed back into production, this time without Pleasence, who died on February 2, 1995. Pleasence had been in ill health during the initial shoot. Reshoots took place in Los Angeles in the summer of 1995. At this time, the Akkads were sidelined as Dimension Films took over the film. With only three months out from the film's release date, Farrands and Chappelle concurrently rewrote the script. Chappelle's revisions recharacterized Kara as a "machine gun-toting heroine", similar to "Linda Hamilton in Terminator 2: Judgment Day". Farrands dropped the recharacterization of Kara as well as "thunderous voices of God" added into a newly scripted climax. Meanwhile, a subplot involving a group of doctors seeking to harness "scientifically-engineered evil" was added into the rewrites and survived into the finished film. Farrands' pages would be dropped in favor for Rand Ravich, who previously rewrote Hellraiser: Bloodline for the studio and Chappelle just one month prior. The ending of the theatrical cut stems from Ravich's rewrites, which added an extended chase sequence, the higher body count, and Tommy's fight with Myers. However, Ravich's rewritten ending, which saw Tommy hoisting The Shape in the air with chains, was never fully adapted from the script. During the last night of filming, the crew were far behind schedule and decided to save on overtime payments, the yet-to-be-shot pages were scrapped entirely and instead the final shot of Michael's mask on the ground was done at the last minute.

Lerner replaced Wilbur in the role of Michael Myers, as the studio executives wanted him to appear less bulky. This resulted in continuity errors as the last third of the film features a slimmer Myers. Some of the additional footage incorporated into the finale of the film was shot at Queen of Angels Hospital in Los Angeles.

In addition to the re-shoots prompted by the poor test screening, the film also underwent significant editing in post-production, resulting in brisker pacing and a "flashier" cinematic style that favored "blood and guts", but, according to Farrands, ultimately resulted in a "more confusing" movie. According to writer Farrands, the stylized flash cuts prominent in the final theatrical cut of Halloween: The Curse of Michael Myers were not originally intended, and he likened the style of the final product to an "MTV video rather than a Halloween film". Composer Alan Howarth similarly called the final product a "fix job", with numerous elements of the production being in flux both during and after principal photography. In addition to Howarth's score being redone, the film's sound design was also significantly altered from Howarth's original "minimalist" design.

=== Music ===
Alan Howarth composed the original musical score for Halloween: The Curse of Michael Myers, which was released on CD by Varèse Sarabande on October 24, 1995.

== Release ==
The troubled production history of Halloween: The Curse of Michael Myers resulted in two cuts of the film, which prompted a legal battle between the film's production company, Nightfall, who wanted to release the original cut, and its distributor, Dimension Films, who had incorporated reshoots and additional material. Ultimately, Dimension Films won the dispute, and their cut of the film was officiated for theatrical release.

An early teaser trailer for the film employed the title Halloween 666: The Origin of Michael Myers, which according to Daniel Farrands, came before an official title had been decided, and that the trailer title was a combination of an earlier script titled The Origin of Michael Myers by another writer, and Farrands' original script titled Halloween 666. At one point, executive producer Moustapha Akkad asked Farrands for a title, who suggested The Curse of Michael Myers as a joke referencing the film's turbulent production. Although Farrands's comment was in jest, Akkad took the name to heart and decided upon it. Farrands also added that this coincidentally made the subtitles similar to those in The Pink Panther films, which also used Return, Revenge, and Curse subtitles as Halloween's fourth, fifth and sixth films, respectively.

Dimension Films released Halloween: The Curse of Michael Myers in the United States on September 29, 1995. It was released the same day in Canada, distributed by Alliance Atlantis. (Note: Newspaper sources indicate the film was released in Canada on the same day it premiered in the United States—September 29, 1995—distributed by Alliance Atlantis.)

=== Alternate versions ===
"[It is] Gothic and creepy, but you kind of lose the intensity of where we've been ... I think we could've gone in and given it more intensity and more of a scare [factor]."

— Writer Farrands on the film's finale in the original cut, which was ultimately re-written and re-shot.

The original workprint cut of the film that screened for test audiences became known colloquially as The Producer's Cut, and features approximately 45 minutes of alternate footage and numerous other differences, ranging from scores and musical cues to substantial shifts in plot, particularly in the film's conclusion. In a retrospective interview, Farrands described the finale in this cut of the film as "creepy" and "Gothic", but conceded that it lacked intensity. According to Wayne Byrne, author of You Can't Kill the Boogeyman: The Ongoing Halloween Saga—13 Movies and Counting (2025), neither the theatrical cut nor The Producer's Cut reflect screenwriter Farrands's original vision of the film.

In the finale of The Producer's Cut, Kara awakens at Smith's Grove Sanitarium on a concrete slab, surrounded by the cult's members, including Mrs. Blankenship, Wynn's secretary Dawn, and other Haddonfield residents. Wynn conducts a ceremony in which Michael will kill Steven as a final sacrifice of innocent blood, after which the curse will pass on to Danny with Kara as his first sacrifice. Kara stalls by appealing to Michael with the revelation that Steven is his biological child. Tommy takes Wynn hostage and forces the cult to free Kara and the children. Pursued by Michael, they run through the sanitarium to a locked gate. Tommy uses the power of the ancient runes to stop Michael in his tracks as Loomis helps them escape. After telling the others he has unfinished business, Loomis finds what appears to be Michael lying on the floor. He removes the mask to reveal Wynn, with whom Michael switched clothes and then escaped. As he dies, Wynn passes on the Thorn symbol, which appears on Loomis' wrist. Realizing that he is the new cult leader, Loomis screams in despair (this is heard as ambient noise in the final frame of the theatrical cut). Michael is shown escaping into the night in Wynn's Man in Black outfit.

Another substantial difference in The Producer's Cut is the death of Jamie Lloyd: she does not die at the beginning of the film, but survives being stabbed by Michael in the barn. She remains in a coma and is taken to the hospital, where Loomis and Wynn visit her. Midway through the film, a "Gothic" montage occurs, which reveals in fragmented detail the conception of Jamie's child among the cult. After the sequence, an unseen person, later revealed to be Wynn, shoots the unconscious Jamie in the head with a silenced pistol. Additionally, John's death scene in The Producer's Cut is shorter; in the theatrical cut, an additional shot (completed during the reshoots) was incorporated of his head graphically exploding from an electrical power surge. Other various transitional shots throughout The Producer's Cut version were extracted or truncated in the theatrical cut.

The Producer's Cut remained officially unreleased for nearly twenty years, though bootlegged copies surfaced among collectors, with unofficial VHS and DVD copies being sold on eBay. Meanwhile, online petitions from fans targeted an official release of it.

The Producer's Cut had its first public theatrical exhibition on October 27, 2013, at the New Beverly Cinema in Los Angeles. Screenwriter Farrands was present for the showing. Anchor Bay Media and Scream Factory gave The Producer's Cut its first official release on Blu-ray in September 2014 as part of their Halloween: The Complete Collection box set.

=== Home media ===
Halloween: The Curse of Michael Myers first released for home media on VHS and LaserDisc on September 10, 1996, from Miramax Home Entertainment. A DVD followed on October 10, 2000. In January 2010, the film was released for the first time on Blu-ray in Canada from Alliance Films alongside Halloween H20: 20 Years Later and Halloween: Resurrection. The film was released on Blu-ray and again on DVD in the United States on May 10, 2011, by Echo Bridge Home Entertainment.

Anchor Bay Entertainment and Scream Factory once again released the film on Blu-ray on September 23, 2014, as a part of their 15-disc box set containing every film in the franchise, up to Rob Zombie's Halloween II (2009). This release features both the theatrical cut of the film and The Producer's Cut (marking the first official release of the latter), and contained extensive bonus features. On September 15, 2015, Lionsgate released a standalone Blu-ray edition of The Producer's Cut. On October 4, 2022, Scream Factory reissued both the theatrical and Producer's Cut editions on 4K UHD Blu-ray in a box set also featuring Halloween H20: 20 Years Later and Halloween: Resurrection.

== Reception ==
=== Box office ===
Halloween: The Curse of Michael Myers earned $7,308,529 during its opening weekend, coming in second to serial killer thriller Seven. It was the first film in the series to be on par with Halloween II's opening weekend gross, as both Halloween 4 and 5 had earned under $7 million. It earned $2.5 million during its second weekend, with its ranking falling to number eight at the U.S. box office.

The film was a modest financial success, going on to gross a total of $15,116,634 at the U.S. box office, with an estimated $5 million budget. With approximately 3,475,088 tickets sold during its initial theatrical run, the film is the second-lowest grossing entry in the franchise, ahead of only Halloween 5.

=== Critical response ===
On the review aggregator website Rotten Tomatoes, 8% of 38 critics' reviews are positive, with an average rating of 3.7/10. The website's consensus reads: "Halloween: The Curse of Michael Myers trades the simple, brutal effectiveness of the original for convoluted mysticism, with disastrously dull results." On Metacritic, the film holds a 10/100 based on 13 reviews, signifying as "overwhelming dislike". It is the lowest rated Halloween film on both sites.

Daniel Kimmel of Variety called the film "tired" and "run-of-the-mill", while Mick LaSalle of the San Francisco Chronicle said the film lacked suspense and said that "not even the presence of the late, gloriously histrionic Donald Pleasence can liven things up", deeming it "bland", "deadening", and "by far the worst in the series". Jim Bray of the Ottawa Citizen found the film "fairly predictable" and noted that the cast's "acting skills seem barely above the level of Myers (George P. Wilbur), who never talks. But then they're not given much of a chance to act. They're too busy running from Myers, who commits one gory murder after another."

Stephen Holden of The New York Times called the film's script "impossibly convoluted", and wrote that "shock effects are applied with such hamfisted regularity that they quickly backfire". Josh Hartl of The Seattle Times criticized the film's conventionality, writing: "instead of sending up the current glut of serial-killer movies, the filmmakers trot out the old slasher tactics." Jack Mathews of the Los Angeles Times similarly criticized the film's lack of originality, comparing it negatively to its predecessors and describing it as a "body count" film. Tom Maurstad of The News-Press gave the film a half-star rating out of four, criticizing it for its lack of plot and emphasis on gore: "The movie, as directed by fresh-from-film-school Joe Chappelle, tosses out a few odd snippets of storyline... but there is no follow through, no real attempt at story."

Richard Harrington of The Washington Post also criticized the script, writing: "While director Joe Chapelle and writer Daniel Farrands took advantage of a clearance sale at the Horror Cliche Emporium, they forgot to stop in at Plots R Us." The Time Out London film guide deemed the film "A series of competently engineered shock moments jollied along by a jazzed-up version of John Carpenter's original electronic score: slicker than crude oil and just as unattractive." The Salt Lake Tribune's Sean Means made a similar assessment of the screenplay, observing that "the mayhem is presented routinely, with little imagination or even logic. Even the promised explanation for Michael's evil is muddled. The mix of runic stones, Satan-worship, DNA testing and old-fashioned boogyman stories never gels."

=== Accolades ===
Institution	Year	Category	Recipient	Result	Ref.
Fangoria Chainsaw Awards	1996	Worst Film	Halloween: The Curse of Michael Myers	Won	
Saturn Awards	2015	Best DVD or Blu-ray Collection	Halloween: The Curse of Michael Myers	Won (Note: As part of the Halloween: The Complete Collection Blu-ray box set by Shout! Factory.)	
Stinkers Bad Movie Awards	1996	Worst Sequel	Paul Freeman	Nominated	
Stinkers Bad Movie Awards	1996	The Sequel Nobody Was Clamoring For	Paul Freeman	Nominated	

=== Modern assessment ===
"Halloween VI: The Curse of Michael Myers bears all the marks of a film made by a true, perhaps obsessive, fan of the series, someone who has collated every detail of the earlier films, and sincerely, courageously attempted to reconcile them."

— John Kenneth Muir on the film's legacy in 2011

Halloween: The Curse of Michael Myers is widely regarded by fans as one of the most divisive films in the franchise. Byrne attributes the "schismatic" response to it over the years as a result of "[the fact] that there has never truly been a definitive version of the film to exist." John Kenneth Muir writes in his book Horror Films of the 1990s (2011) that Halloween: The Curse of Michael Myers is "a well-intentioned sequel so determined to answer questions, fill in details, and enrich the mythology that at times it forgets to present a cogent narrative of characters the audience can care about." In their comprehensive book The Films of the Nineties (2001), however, writers Robert and Gwendolyn Nowlan positively describe the film as an "atmospheric and suspenseful thriller".

In a 2022 ranking of every film in the Halloween franchise by IndieWire, Halloween: The Curse of Michael Myers was ranked number five, with writer Jamie Righetti praising the film: "The Curse of Thorn. The return of Tommy Doyle. Even more members of the Strode family. A final goodbye to the unforgettable Donald Pleasance [sic] and his irascible Dr. Loomis. Halloween: The Curse of Michael Myers really does have it all, and it's one of the most underrated sequels in the franchise."

Some fans and film critics have argued that the Producer's Cut is the superior version of the film. Writing in a Bloody Disgusting retrospective, Alex DiVincenzo noted that the Producer's Cut benefits from its more significant featuring of the Dr. Loomis character, and that it is ultimately a better film. Jessica Beebe of Screen Rant made a similar assessment, noting that the cult of Thorn subplot is more clearly presented in the Producer's Cut, and that its finale better contextualizes the cult. Muir, however, alternately described The Producer's Cut version of the film "still decidedly mediocre" despite "some interesting moments".

== Related works ==
Screenwriter Farrands originally pitched a followup to Halloween: The Curse of Michael Myers that had Tommy Doyle returning, and concluded with a revelation in which Laurie Strode had impersonated Michael Myers and committed a series of murders herself. This sequel went undeveloped. Instead, the film was followed by Halloween H20: 20 Years Later (1998), which retroactively abandoned the Jamie Lloyd storyline initiated in Halloween 4: The Return of Michael Myers (1988), instead serving as a direct sequel to Halloween II (1981) and follows Laurie Strode, who is pursued by Myers twenty years after the events depicted in the first two films. Jamie Lee Curtis reprised her role of Laurie Strode in the film.

A comic book tie-in trilogy released by Chaos! Comics in 2001, however, did incorporate the Jamie Lloyd storyline as well as depict events from Halloween: The Curse of Michael Myers, with Farrands contributing to the writing.

== See also ==
- List of films set around Halloween

== Sources ==
- Armstrong, Keith Byron (2003). Slasher Films: An International Filmography, 1960 Through 2001. Jefferson, North Carolina: McFarland & Company. ISBN 978-0-786-41462-8.
- Byrne, Wayne (2025). You Can't Kill the Boogeyman: The Ongoing Halloween Saga—13 Movies and Counting. New York City, New York: Bloomsbury Publishing. ISBN 978-1-493-07979-7.
- Chaney, Jen (2015). As If!: The Oral History of Clueless as told by Amy Heckerling and the Cast and Crew. New York City, New York: Simon & Schuster. ISBN 978-1-476-79909-4.
- Etling, Laurence (2014). Radio in the Movies: A History and Filmography, 1926-2010. Jefferson, North Carolina: McFarland & Company. ISBN 978-0-786-48616-8.
- Farrands, Daniel; Howarth, Alan (2014). Halloween: The Curse of Michael Myers, The Producer's Cut. Halloween: The Ultimate Collection (Blu-ray audio commentary). Scream Factory and Anchor Bay Entertainment.
- Knöppler, Christian (2017). The Monster Always Returns: American Horror Films and Their Remakes. Bielefeld, Germany: Transcript Verlag. ISBN 978-3-839-43735-3.
- McNeill, Dustin; Mullins, Travis (2019). Taking Shape: Developing Halloween From Script to Scream. Greensboro, North Carolina: Harker Press. ISBN 978-0-578-58681-6.
- McNeill, Dustin; Mullins, Travis (2020). Taking Shape II: The Lost Halloween Sequels. Greensboro, North Carolina: Harker Press. ISBN 978-0-578-74526-8.
- Muir, John Kenneth (2011). Horror Films of the 1990s. Jefferson, North Carolina: McFarland & Company. ISBN 978-0-786-48480-5.
- Nowlan, Robert A.; Nowlan, Gwendolyn L. (2001). The Films of the Nineties. Jefferson, North Carolina: McFarland & Company. ISBN 978-0-786-40974-7.
- Norman, Jason (2014). Welcome to Our Nightmares: Behind the Scene with Today's Horror Actors. Jefferson, North Carolina: McFarland & Company. ISBN 978-0-786-47986-3.
- Rogers, Nicholas (2003). Halloween: From Pagan Ritual to Party Night. Oxford, England: Oxford University Press. ISBN 978-0-195-16896-9.
- Spiegel, Josh (2023). Timelines of Terror: The Fractured Continuities of Horror Film Sequels. Jefferson, North Carolina: McFarland & Company. ISBN 978-1-476-64923-8.
