= Irving Belateche =

American screenwriter

- Occupations: Author, professor
- Writing career
- Notable works: The Demolished Man, The Veil, Testament, Expecting, Halloween: The Curse of Michael Myers

Irving Yacine Belateche is an American screenwriter, author, and professor at the University of Southern California's School of Cinematic Arts.

== Early life and education ==
Belateche earned a B.A. in English literature from Columbia University. He later obtained an M.A. in Film production with a focus on screenwriting from the USC School of Cinematic Arts.

== Career ==
=== Screenwriting ===
Belateche has written and sold 22 feature film scripts to major Hollywood studios, including Paramount Pictures, Sony Pictures, and Warner Bros. His screenwriting credits include Combustion, Testament, Expecting, and The Veil. He also adapted Alfred Bester's Hugo Award-winning novel The Demolished Man for development at Paramount Pictures.

Throughout his career, Belateche has collaborated with producers and directors such as Lawrence Bender (Pulp Fiction), Joel Silver (The Matrix), Jason Blum (Paranormal Activity), and Robert Zemeckis (Back to the Future).

=== Authorship ===
Belateche has written several novels, including Einstein’s Secret and The Origin of Dracula. His works often blend elements of historical fiction, science fiction, and thriller genres.

=== Teaching and Educational Contributions ===
Belateche is a professor at the USC School of Cinematic Arts, where he teaches screenwriting and film production. He also established the screenwriting program at ShanghaiTech University in China.

Additionally, he has conducted seminars for gaming companies such as Tencent and Blizzard Entertainment. He has provided educational workshops for filmmakers in China, Malaysia, Pakistan, Saudi Arabia, and North Africa.

== Cultural Exchange and Memberships ==
Belateche serves as a Film Expert for the U.S. Department of State’s American Film Showcase, a cultural exchange program that operates in over 40 countries. He is also a member of the Writers Guild of America West.

== Bibliography ==
=== Novels ===
- Einstein’s Secret
- The Origin of Dracula

=== Screenplays (Selected) ===
- Combustion
- Testament
- Expecting
- The Veil
- The Demolished Man (adaptation)
