= Moustapha Akkad =

Syrian-American director (1930–2005)

Moustapha Al Akkad
- مصطفى العقاد
- Born: July 1, 1930; Aleppo, French Mandate for Syria and the Lebanon (modern-day Syria)
- Died: November 11, 2005 (aged 75); Amman, Jordan
- Cause of death: Killed in bombing
- Education: University of California at Los Angeles, University of Southern California
- Occupations: Film producer, director
- Years active: 1960s–2005
- Known for: Producing the series of Halloween films
- Spouses: Patricia Al Akkad (divorced): Sooha Ascha Al Akkad
- Children: 4 (including Malek Akkad)
- Relatives: Tareq Salahi

Moustapha al Akkad (Arabic: مصطفى العقاد, romanized: Muṣṭafā al-ʿAqqād; July 1, 1930 – November 11, 2005) was a Syrian-American film producer and director, best known for producing the original series of Halloween films and directing The Message and Lion of the Desert. He was killed along with his daughter Rima Al Akkad Monla in the 2005 Amman bombings. He is also the cousin of television personality star Tareq Salahi.

== Early life ==
Al Akkad was born on July 1, 1930, in Aleppo in the French Mandate for Syria and the Lebanon. He received his high school degree from the Aleppo American College. His father, then a customs officer, gave him $200 and a copy of the Quran before he left for the United States to study film direction and production at the University of California, Los Angeles (UCLA). Akkad spent a further three years studying for a Master's degree at the University of Southern California (USC), where he met the director Sam Peckinpah. Peckinpah became Akkad's mentor in Hollywood and hired him as a consultant for a film about the Algerian War that never made it to the big screen, but he continued to encourage him until he found a job as a producer at CBS.

== Career ==
In 1976, he produced and directed Mohammad, Messenger of God (released as The Message in 1977 in the United States), starring Anthony Quinn and Irene Papas. Akkad faced resistance from Hollywood due to its subject matter, which forced him to make the film in Morocco.

While creating Muhammad, Messenger of God, he consulted Islamic clerics, he wanted and tried to be respectful towards Islam and its views on portraying Muhammad. The film would not show Muhammad in any shape or form and would stick to aniconic rules, focusing instead on his companions. He got approval from Al-Azhar University in Egypt but was rejected by the Muslim World League in Mecca, Saudi Arabia. The governments of Kuwait, Libya and Morocco promised to support the film financially, and when it was rejected by the Muslim World League, Kuwait kept its financial support but stopped other kinds of supports. King Hassan II of Morocco gave his full support for the production of the film. The production took one year, Akkad filmed for six months in Morocco, but had to stop when the Saudi government exerted great pressure on the government of Morocco to stop the production. Akkad went to Libya's Muammar Gaddafi for support in order to complete the project, Gaddafi allowed him to move the filming to Libya for the remaining six months until the film was finalized. The film would later be retitled The Message to avoid further controversy.

Akkad saw the film as a way to bridge the gap between the Western and Islamic worlds, stating in a 1976 interview:

I did the film because it is a personal thing for me ... Being a Muslim myself who lived in the West I felt that it was my obligation my duty to tell the truth about Islam. It is a religion that has a 700 million following, yet it's so little known about which surprised me. I thought I should tell the story that will bring this [history] to the west.

In 1978, he helped make low-budget film history when he produced Halloween with director John Carpenter. Akkad became best known for his key involvement in the first eight Halloween films, as an executive producer (the only producer to participate in all of these films). The series was highly profitable and hugely influential to subsequent horror films.

In 1980 he directed Lion of the Desert, in which Quinn and Irene Papas were joined by Oliver Reed, Rod Steiger, and John Gielgud. It was about the real-life Bedouin leader Omar Mukhtar (Quinn), who fought Benito Mussolini's Italian troops in the deserts of Libya. The movie is now critically acclaimed, after initially receiving negative publicity in the West for being partially funded by Libya's Muammar Gaddafi, who invested $35 million in the movie. This negative publicity may have been the cause of its relatively poor performance at the box office. Clint Morris describes the movie as: "A grand epic adventure that'll stand as a highpoint in the producing career of Moustapha Akkad." In 1985, his production company Trancas International Films had inked an agreement with Galaxy International releasing in order to release films for a seven-picture agreement worldwide.

In the United Kingdom, Akkad once tried to buy Pinewood Studios from The Rank Organisation and also had a studio at Twickenham. At the time of his death, he was in the process of producing an $80 million movie featuring Sean Connery about Saladin and the Crusades, for which he already had the script, that would be filmed in Jordan. Speaking of the film, he said:

Saladin exactly portrays Islam. Right now, Islam is portrayed as a terrorist religion. Because a few terrorists are Muslims, the whole religion has that image. If there ever was a religious war full of terror, it was the Crusades. But you can't blame Christianity because a few adventurers did this. That's my message.

== Death ==
Akkad and his 34-year-old daughter, Rima Akkad Monla, were killed in the 2005 Amman bombings. They were both in the lobby at the Grand Hyatt Amman on November 9 when a bomb exploded; his daughter died instantly, and Akkad died of his injuries two days later in a hospital. He is buried in the Al-Jadidah Cemetery in Aleppo, Syria.

Akkad was survived by his former wife, Patricia Al Akkad and their sons, Taric and Malek, who helped produce most of the Halloween movies, as well as his widow, Suha Ascha Akkad, and their son Zade.

== Legacy ==
He was honoured by his native city of Aleppo, and the Aleppo City Council has renamed a school and a street after Moustapha Akkad. In 2008, a street in downtown Beirut was renamed after Moustapha Akkad. The 2007 remake of Halloween was dedicated to Moustapha Akkad. The 2018 film Halloween, a direct sequel to the 1978 original film, also features a dedication to Akkad in the end credits.

== Filmography ==
Year	Title	Director	Producer	Presenter	Notes
1976	The Message	Yes	Yes	No	a.k.a. Mohammed, Messenger of God
1978	Halloween	No	Executive	Yes	
1980	Lion of the Desert	Yes	Yes	No	
1981	Halloween II	No	Executive	Yes	
1982	Halloween III: Season of the Witch	No	Executive	Yes	
1985	Appointment with Fear	No	Executive	No	
1986	Free Ride	No	Executive	No	
1988	Halloween 4: The Return of Michael Myers	No	Executive	Yes	
1989	Halloween 5: The Revenge of Michael Myers	No	Executive	Yes	
1995	Halloween: The Curse of Michael Myers	No	Executive	Yes	
1998	Halloween H20: 20 Years Later	No	Executive	Yes	
2002	Halloween: Resurrection	No	Executive	Yes	
