= J. C. Brandy =

British actor and musician

- Born: 15 November 1975 (age 50); London, England
- Occupations: Actress, songwriter
- Years active: 1989–present

Justine Chelsea "J. C." Brandy (born 15 November 1975) is a British-born American actress.

== Early life ==
Brandy is an actress, songwriter, director, and acting coach. She was born in London but grew up in New York City, where she attended Fiorello H. LaGuardia High School of Music & Art and Performing Arts as a drama major. She later went on to study at The London Academy of Dramatic Arts. She received additional instruction from Larry Moss, Anthony Abeson, The Neighborhood Playhouse, Patsy Rodenburg (Shakespeare), The Upright Citizens Brigade, Joanna Gleason (Musical Theatre), and Jean Louis Rodriguez (Alexander Technique).

== Career ==
Brandy is a critically acclaimed actress. She booked her first job at the age of 14 as a series regular on the CBS series Wolf. She has been cast in over a dozen films, studio and independent, a multitude of television shows, and many roles in regional theatre. Her credits include Star Trek: The Next Generation, CSI: Crime Scene Investigation, Strong Medicine, Silk Stalkings, Days of Our Lives, Boomtown, McBride: The Chameleon Murder, Halloween: The Curse of Michael Myers (as Jamie Lloyd), What Lies Beneath, and Strong Medicine. She was awarded Best Actress at the Festival International de Biarritz for her performance in the independent film God’s Helper. Brandy is also a songwriter and guitarist for the all-female band Lo-Ball and has penned songs on the soundtracks of Legally Blonde and What Lies Beneath. She is a trained theater actress, and starred in Lewis Black's One Slight Hitch at the Falcon Theater in 1994. Other notable stage performances include Marlene in Top Girls and Velma in Hairspray. Brandy is also an acting teacher, coach and director.

== Filmography ==
- Wolf (1989–1990, TV Series) – Angeline Bacarri
- Coconut Downs (1991, TV Movie) – Cindy
- Runaway Father (1991, TV Movie) – Andrea
- Star Trek: The Next Generation (1993, TV Series) – Ensign Marta Batanides
- I'm the Elephant, U Are the Mouse (1994) – Alice
- Menendez: A Killing in Beverly Hills (1994, TV Movie) – Jackie Hayes
- Murder, She Wrote (1995, TV Series) – Louise Henderson
- Halloween: The Curse of Michael Myers (1995) – Jamie Lloyd
- Kindred: The Embraced (1996, TV Series) – Riannon
- Hollywood Safari (1997) – Samantha
- Dogstar (1997) – Gabrielle
- Devil in the Flesh (1998) – Janie Magray
- Silk Stalkings (1992–1998, TV Series) – Nicole 'Nikki' Spencer / Kelly Henderson / Nicole Gaines
- Lucinda's Spell (1998) – Betsy
- What Lies Beneath (2000) – Band Member (uncredited)
- Bar Hopping (2000, TV Movie) – Aerosmith
- God's Helper (2001, Short) – Reanne
- Strong Medicine (2001, TV Series) – Molly Harris
- Prometheus Bound (2002) – Kathleen
- Boomtown (2003, TV Series) – Chandler
- Asleep at the Wheel on the Road to Nowhere (2004, Short) – Ai
- CSI: Crime Scene Investigation (2004, TV Series) – Nicole 'Raven' Richards
- McBride: The Chameleon Murder (2005, TV Movie) – Chelsea Robertson
- Days of Our Lives (2005, TV Series) – Marguerite
- Comedy Hell (2006) – Tina
- Love's Unfolding Dream (2007, TV Movie) – Caroline
- Prank (2008) – Female cop
- Zimm (2009, TV Series) – Dr. Rubye Lee
- Femme Fatales (2011, TV Series) – Maxine
- The Victim (2011) – Missing Girl
- 333 (2012)
