= Don Shanks (stuntman) =

American stuntman

- Born: Donald L. Shanks; February 26, 1950 (age 76); Piasa, Illinois, U.S.
- Occupations: Actor; stunt performer
- Years active: 1974–present

Donald L. Shanks (born February 26, 1950) is an American actor and stuntman, known for his role as Michael Myers in Halloween 5: The Revenge of Michael Myers, and Nakoma, the Native American friend of the title character in the 1977 television series The Life and Times of Grizzly Adams.

== Biography ==
Shanks was born in Piasa, Illinois on February 26, 1950 and grew up on a farm.

Shanks portrayed Michael Myers in Halloween 5: The Revenge of Michael Myers. In 2006, he appeared as Ben Willis, the infamous serial killer in the film I'll Always Know What You Did Last Summer. Shanks appeared in the film The Last Sin Eater as a Native American chief. It was released in the U.S. on February 9, 2007.

== Filmography ==
=== Actor ===
- Smothered (2016) - Self
- Little Bear and the Master (2008)
- The Last Sin Eater (2007) - Indian Chief
- I'll Always Know What You Did Last Summer (2006) (V) - Ben Willis / The Fisherman
- Urban Legends: Bloody Mary (2005) (V) - Coach Jacoby
- No Dogs Allowed (2002) - Junior
- Touched by an Angel (2001) (TV series) - Guard #1
- Water with Food Coloring (2001) - Thug
- Twice Today (2001) - Joe Oliver
- Primary Suspect (2000) - (Chief) Lance
- The Crow: Salvation (2000) - Guard #1
- Ride with the Devil (1999/I) - George
- Made Men (1999) - Caleb
- The Tempest (1998) (TV) - Overseer
- Legion of Fire: Killer Ants! (1998) (TV) - Greywolf
- Truth or Consequences, N.M. (1997) - Vago Wiseguy #3
- Walking Thunder (1997) - Blood Coat
- Last Resort (1996) - Walking Far
- Unforgivable (1996) (TV) - George
- 3 Ninjas Knuckle Up (1995) (as Donald L. Shanks) - Charlie
- Dumb and Dumber (1994) - Third Waiter
- The Legend of Wolf Mountain (1993) - Simcoe
- The ButterCream Gang in Secret of Treasure Mountain (1993) (V) - Indian holding an axe
- Wind Dancer (1993) - Halfmoon
- The Secret Of Lost Creek (1992) (TV series) - Charlie Little Elk
- The Indian Runner (1991) - Young Indian Runner
- Tripwire (1990) - Indian Fighter
- Halloween 5: The Revenge of Michael Myers (1989) (as Donald L. Shanks) - Michael Myers / Man in Black
- Spirit of the Eagle (1989) - Running Wolf
- Stranger on My Land (1988) (TV) - Construction Worker #1
- Louis L'Amour's Down the Long Hills (1986) (TV) - Ashawakie
- Silent Night, Deadly Night (1984) (as Donald L. Shanks) - Santa Climbing in Window
- Sweet Sixteen (1983) - Jason Longshadow
- Revenge of the Ninja (1983) - Chief
- Legend of the Wild (1981) -
- The Ghost Dance (1980) (as Donald L. Shanks) - Excavation Worker
- The Incredible Hulk (1979) (TV series) - Little Jim
- The Chisholms (1979) (mini TV series) - Enapay
- How the West Was Won (1979) (TV series) - Red Kettle
- The Life and Times of Grizzly Adams (1977–1978) (TV series) - Nakoma
- The Last of the Mohicans (1977) (TV) - Uncas
- Guardian of the Wilderness (1976) - Teneiya
- The Adventures of Frontier Fremont (1976) -
- The Life and Times of Grizzly Adams (1974) - Nakoma
