= List of Halloween (franchise) characters =

This is a list of characters that appear in the Halloween horror film franchise.

== Cast and characters ==
- Note: Halloween III: Season of the Witch is not connected in continuity to any of the other films.

=== Continuity A (The Original Timeline: 1978–81) ===
| Character | Continuity A | |
| Character | Halloween | Halloween II |
|---|---|---|
| Character | 1978 | 1981 |
| Michael Myers The Shape | Nick Castle Tony Moran (unmasked) Will Sandin^{Y} | Dick Warlock Adam Gunn^{Y} |
| Dr. Samuel "Sam" Loomis | Donald Pleasence | Donald Pleasence |
| Laurie Strode | Jamie Lee Curtis | Jamie Lee Curtis Nichole Drucker^{Y} |
| Sheriff Leigh Brackett | Charles Cyphers | Charles Cyphers |
| Marion Chambers | Nancy Stephens | Nancy Stephens |
| Annie Brackett | Nancy Kyes | Nancy Kyes^{U} |
| Lynda Van Der Klok | P. J. Soles | Mentioned |
| Tommy Doyle | Brian Andrews | Brian Andrews^{A} |
| Lindsay Wallace | Kyle Richards | Kyle Richards^{A} |
| Lonnie Elam | Brent Le Page | |
| Bob Simms | John Michael Graham | Mentioned |
| Judith Myers | Sandy Johnson | Mentioned |
| Dr. Terence Wynn | Robert Phalen | |
| Morgan Strode | Peter Griffith | Mentioned |
| Ben Tramer | Mentioned | Jack Verbois |
| Jimmy | | Lance Guest |
| Nurse Karen Bailey | | Pamela Susan Shoop |
| Deputy Gary Hunt | | Hunter von Leer |
| Nurse Jill Franco | | Tawny Moyer |
| Nurse Janet Marshall | | Ana Alicia |
| Nurse Virginia Alves | | Gloria Gifford |
| Budd Scarlotti | | Leo Rossi |
| Dr. Frederick Mixter | | Ford Rainey |

=== Continuity B (The Thorn Timeline: 1978–1995) ===
| Character | Continuity B | | | | |
| Character | Halloween | Halloween II | Halloween 4: The Return of Michael Myers | Halloween 5: The Revenge of Michael Myers | Halloween: The Curse of Michael Myers |
|---|---|---|---|---|---|
| Character | 1978 | 1981 | 1988 | 1989 | 1995 |
| Michael Myers The Shape | Nick Castle Tony Moran (unmasked) Will Sandin^{Y} | Dick Warlock Adam Gunn^{Y} | George P. Wilbur Tom Morga (ambulance/gas station scenes) Erik Preston^{Y} | Don Shanks | George P. Wilbur A. Michael Lerner (Theatrical Cut sanitarium scenes) |
| Dr. Samuel "Sam" Loomis | Donald Pleasence | Donald Pleasence | Donald Pleasence | Donald Pleasence | Donald Pleasence |
| Laurie Strode | Jamie Lee Curtis | Jamie Lee Curtis Nichole Drucker^{Y} | Jamie Lee Curtis^{P} | Mentioned | Mentioned |
| Sheriff Leigh Brackett | Charles Cyphers | Charles Cyphers | Mentioned | | |
| Marion Chambers | Nancy Stephens | Nancy Stephens | | | |
| Annie Brackett | Nancy Kyes | Nancy Kyes | | | |
| Lynda Van Der Klok | P. J. Soles | Mentioned | | | |
| Tommy Doyle | Brian Andrews | Brian Andrews^{Y} | Danny Ray | | Paul Rudd |
| Lindsey Wallace | Kyle Richards | Kyle Richards^{Y} | Leslie L. Rohland | | |
| Lonnie Elam | Brent Le Page | | | | |
| Bob Simms | John Michael Graham | Mentioned | | | |
| Judith Myers | Sandy Johnson | Mentioned | | | Mentioned |
| Dr. Terence Wynn | Robert Phalen | | | Don Shanks | Mitchell Ryan |
| Morgan Strode | Peter Griffith | Mentioned | | | |
| Ben Tramer | Mentioned | Jack Verbois | | | |
| Jimmy | | Lance Guest | | | |
| Nurse Karen Bailey | | Pamela Susan Shoop | | | |
| Deputy Gary Hunt | | Hunter von Leer | | | |
| Nurse Jill Franco | | Tawny Moyer | | | |
| Nurse Janet Marshall | | Ana Alicia | | | |
| Nurse Virginia Alves | | Gloria Gifford | | | |
| Budd Scarlotti | | Leo Rossi | | | |
| Dr. Frederick Mixter | | Ford Rainey | | | |
| Jamie Lloyd | | | Danielle Harris | Danielle Harris | J.C. Brandy Danielle Harris^{Y}^{A} |
| Rachel Carruthers | | | Ellie Cornell | Ellie Cornell | Mentioned |
| Sheriff Ben Meeker | | | Beau Starr | Beau Starr | Mentioned |
| Darlene Carruthers | | | Karen Alston | Karen Alston | |
| Richard Carruthers | | | Jeff Olson | Mentioned | |
| Dr. Hoffman | | | Michael Pataki | | |
| Kelly Meeker | | | Kathleen Kinmont | | |
| Brady | | | Sasha Jenson | | |
| Earl Ford | | | Gene Ross | | |
| Rev. Jackson P. Sayer | | | Carmen Filpi | | |
| Tina Williams | | | | Wendy Kaplan | |
| Samantha "Sammy" Thomas | | | | Tamara Glynn | |
| Billy Hill | | | | Jeffrey Landman | |
| Mike | | | | Jonathan Chapin | |
| Spitz | | | | Matthew Walker | |
| Nurse Patsey | | | | Betty Carvalho | |
| Dr. Max Hart | | | | Max Robinson | |
| Deputy Charlie Bloch | | | | Troy Evans | |
| Deputy Nick Ross | | | | Frank Como | |
| Deputy Tom Farrah | | | | David Ursin | |
| Kara Strode | | | | | Marianne Hagan |
| Danny Strode | | | | | Devin Gardner |
| Beth | | | | | Mariah O'Brien |
| Tim Strode | | | | | Keith Bogart |
| Debra Strode | | | | | Kim Darby |
| John Strode | | | | | Bradford English |
| Barry Simms | | | | | Leo Geter |
| Nurse Mary | | | | | Susan Swift |
| Dr. Bonham | | | | | Alan Echeverria |
| Mrs. Blankenship | | | | | Janice Knickrehm |

=== Continuity C (The Dimension Films Timeline: 1978–81; 1998–2002) ===
| Character | Continuity C | | | |
| Character | Halloween | Halloween II | Halloween H20: 20 Years Later | Halloween: Resurrection |
|---|---|---|---|---|
| Character | 1978 | 1981 | 1998 | 2002 |
| Michael Myers The Shape | Nick Castle Tony Moran (unmasked) Will Sandin^{Y} | Dick Warlock Adam Gunn^{Y} | Chris Durand | Brad Loree |
| Laurie Strode Keri Tate | Jamie Lee Curtis | Jamie Lee Curtis Nichole Drucker^{Y} | Jamie Lee Curtis | Jamie Lee Curtis |
| Dr. Samuel "Sam" Loomis | Donald Pleasence | Donald Pleasence | Donald Pleasence^{P} Tom Kane^{V} | |
| Marion Chambers | Nancy Stephens | Nancy Stephens | Nancy Stephens | Mentioned |
| Annie Brackett | Nancy Kyes | Nancy Kyes | | Mentioned |
| Tommy Doyle | Brian Andrews | Brian Andrews^{A} | Mentioned | |
| Lynda Van Der Klok | P. J. Soles | Mentioned | Mentioned | Mentioned |
| Judith Myers | Sandy Johnson | Mentioned | Mentioned | Mentioned |
| Bob Simms | John Michael Graham | Mentioned | | Mentioned |
| John Tate | | | Josh Hartnett | Josh Hartnett^{P} |
| Molly Cartwell | | | Michelle Williams | |
| Will Brennan | | | Adam Arkin | Adam Arkin^{A} |
| Sarah Wainthrope | | | Jodi Lyn O'Keefe | Mentioned |
| Charlie Deveraux | | | Adam Hann-Byrd | Mentioned |
| Norma Watson | | | Janet Leigh | |
| Ronald "Ronny" Jones | | | LL Cool J | |
| Jimmy Howell | | | Joseph Gordon-Levitt | |
| Matt Sampson | | | Matt Winston | |
| Detective Fitzsimmons | | | Beau Billingslea | |
| Tony Alegre | | | Branden Williams | |
| Freddie Harris | | | | Busta Rhymes |
| Sara Moyer | | | | Bianca Kajlich |
| Bill Woodlake | | | | Thomas Ian Nicholas |
| Jennifer "Jen" Danzig | | | | Katee Sackhoff |
| Donna Chang | | | | Daisy McCrackin |
| Rudy Grimes | | | | Sean Patrick Thomas |
| Myles "Deckard" Barton | | | | Ryan Merriman |
| Jim Morgan | | | | Luke Kirby |
| Nora Winston | | | | Tyra Banks |

=== Continuity D (The Remake Timeline: 2007–2009) ===
| Character | Rob Zombie film continuity | |
| Character | Halloween | Halloween II |
|---|---|---|
| Character | 2007 | 2009 |
| Michael Myers The Shape | Tyler Mane Daeg Faerch^{Y} | Tyler Mane Chase Wright Vanek^{Y} |
| Dr. Samuel "Sam" Loomis | Malcolm McDowell | Malcolm McDowell |
| Laurie Strode Angel Myers | Scout Taylor-Compton Sydnie and Myla Pitzer^{I} Lela Altman^{I} | Scout Taylor-Compton |
| Annie Brackett | Danielle Harris | Danielle Harris |
| Sheriff Leigh Brackett | Brad Dourif | Brad Dourif |
| Deborah Myers | Sheri Moon Zombie | Sheri Moon Zombie |
| Lynda van der Klok | Kristina Klebe | Kristina Klebe^{P} |
| Nurse Wynn | Sybil Danning | |
| Judith Myers | Hanna R. Hall | Hanna R. Hall^{P} |
| Tommy Doyle | Skyler Gisondo | |
| Lindsey Wallace | Jenny Gregg Stewart | |
| Bob Simms | Nick Mennell | |
| Ronnie White | William Forsythe | William Forsythe^{P} |
| Steve Haley | Adam Weisman | Adam Weisman^{P} |
| Ismael Cruz | Danny Trejo | |
| Cynthia Strode | Dee Wallace | Dee Wallace^{P} |
| Mason Strode | Pat Skipper | Pat Skipper^{P} |
| Wesley Rhoade | Daryl Sabara | Daryl Sabara^{P} |
| Big Joe Grizzly | Ken Foree | Ken Foree^{P} |
| Lou Martini Big Lou | Daniel Roebuck | Daniel Roebuck |
| Mya Rockwell | | Brea Grant |
| Harley David | | Angela Trimbur |
| Deputy Webb | | Bill Fagerbakke |
| Barbara Collier | | Margot Kidder |
| Deputy Fred King | | Mark Christopher Lawrence |

=== Continuity E (The Universal/Blumhouse Timeline: 1978; 2018–2022) ===
| Character | Universal/Blumhouse continuity | | | |
| Character | Halloween | Halloween | Halloween Kills | Halloween Ends |
|---|---|---|---|---|
| Character | 1978 | 2018 | 2021 | 2022 |
| Michael Myers The Shape | Nick Castle Tony Moran (unmasked) Will Sandin^{Y} | James Jude Courtney Nick Castle | James Jude Courtney Nick Castle Airon Armstrong (1978 flashback) Christian Michael Pates^{Y} | James Jude Courtney Nick Castle |
| Laurie Strode | Jamie Lee Curtis | Jamie Lee Curtis | Jamie Lee Curtis | Jamie Lee Curtis |
| Dr. Samuel "Sam" Loomis | Donald Pleasence | Colin Mahan^{V} | Colin Mahan^{V} Tom Jones, Jr. | |
| Sheriff Leigh Brackett | Charles Cyphers | | Charles Cyphers | |
| Marion Chambers | Nancy Stephens | | Nancy Stephens | |
| Thomas "Tommy" Doyle | Brian Andrews | | Anthony Michael Hall | |
| Ronald "Lonnie" Elam | Brent Le Page | Mentioned | Robert Longstreet Tristian Eggerling^{Y} | |
| Lindsey Wallace | Kyle Richards | | Kyle Richards | Kyle Richards |
| Annie Brackett | Nancy Kyes | Mentioned | Nancy Kyes^{A} | |
| Lynda Van Der Klok | P.J. Soles | Mentioned | P.J. Soles^{P} | |
| Bob Simms | John Michael Graham | Mentioned | Bob Odenkirk^{P} | |
| Judith Myers | Sandy Johnson | Sandy Johnson^{A} | Mentioned | |
| Allyson Nelson | | Andi Matichak | Andi Matichak | Andi Matichak |
| Deputy Frank Hawkins | | Will Patton | Will Patton Thomas Mann^{Y} | Will Patton |
| Karen Nelson (née Strode) | | Judy Greer Sophia Miller^{Y} | Judy Greer | Judy Greer^{A} |
| Dr. Ranbir Sartain | | Haluk Bilginer | Haluk Bilginer^{A} | |
| Dana Haines | | Rhian Rees | | |
| Aaron Korey | | Jefferson Hall | | |
| Ray Nelson | | Toby Huss | Mentioned | Mentioned |
| Sheriff Barker | | Omar Dorsey | Omar Dorsey | Omar Dorsey |
| Cameron Elam | | Dylan Arnold | Dylan Arnold | Dylan Arnold^{A} |
| Julian Morrisey | | Jibrail Nantambu | Jibrail Nantambu | Jibrail Nantambu |
| Vicky | | Virginia Gardner | Mentioned | |
| Dave | | Miles Robbins | | |
| Oscar | | Drew Scheid | Drew Scheid | Drew Scheid^{A} |
| Vanessa Wilson | | Carmela McNeal | Carmela McNeal | Carmela McNeal^{A} |
| Marcus Wilson | | Michael Smallwood | Michael Smallwood | Michael Smallwood^{A} |
| Lance Tovoli | | David Lowe | David Lowe | |
| Sondra Dickerson | | Diva Tyler | Diva Tyler | Diva Tyler |
| Deputy Graham | | | Brian F. Durkin | |
| Roger | | | Lenny Clarke | |
| Christy | | | Salem Collins | |
| Big John | | | Scott MacArthur | Scott MacArthur^{A} |
| Little John | | | Michael McDonald | |
| Deputy Sullivan | | | Ryan Lewis | |
| Corey Cunningham | | | | Rohan Campbell |
| Joan Cunningham | | | | Joanne Baron |
| Ronald Prevo | | | | Rick Moose |
| Terry Tramer | | | | Michael Barbieri |
| Robert Tramer | | | | Tony DeMil |
| Officer Doug Mulaney | | | | Jesse C. Boyd |
| Deb | | | | Michele Dawson |
| Dr. Mathis | | Mentioned | Mentioned | Michael O'Leary |

== A ==
=== Aaron Korey ===
- Portrayed by Jefferson Hall
- Appears in: Halloween (2018)
- Status: Deceased
- Died in: Halloween (2018)

Aaron Korey is a British true crime podcaster and partner of Dana Haines. Aaron and Dana have created numerous critically acclaimed podcasts, including one that shed new light on a 20-year-old murder case. Aaron, having followed Michael's case for many years, goes to Smith's Grove with Dana to interview Michael. Despite showing Michael his mask, Michael refuses to speak. Aaron and Dana then go to interview Laurie, only managing to get the interview by bribing Laurie. The podcasters stop at a gas station, where Dana goes to the bathroom. Aaron discovers a dead mechanic and attempts to rescue Dana from Michael, attacking Michael with a crowbar, but Michael bashes Aaron against a wall repeatedly and then Dana's stall, breaking the door. He dies just as Michael kills Dana.

=== Alan Gateway ===
- Portrayed by Michael Rudd
- Appears in: Halloween 4: The Return of Michael Myers
- Status: Deceased
- Died in: Halloween 4: The Return of Michael Myers

Alan "Big Al" Gateway lost his son, who was killed by Michael Myers, on October 31, 1978. When he hears on a news station that Michael Myers has returned, he attempts to kill him for revenge. He, his brother Orrin, his friend Earl and other local men band together and try to locate Michael so that they can kill him. However, he is attacked and murdered by Michael, who stabs him in the central area of his stomach when he fights against him on the back of a pick up truck.

=== Alice Martin ===
- Portrayed by Anne Bruner
- Appears in: Halloween II (1981)
- Status: Deceased
- Died in: Halloween II (1981)

Alice Martin is a teenager from Haddonfield, Illinois who is at home alone on Halloween night of 1978 and hears her neighbor, Mrs. Elrod, scream. She goes outside and calls out in the direction of her neighbors' house asking if they were alright but gets no response, and returns to her house. She resumes talking on the telephone with her friend and tells her that her parents left to go visit a relative and is happy to have the house to herself. Then her friend informs her of what is happening in Haddonfield. Alice turns on the radio while still on the phone with her friend, and grows concerned when she hears that the killer is still on the loose. Then she hears a strange noise which makes her jump and drop the phone. She then notices the front door is open and walks into the living room asking if anyone is there. Once she is halfway across the living room, Michael Myers suddenly appears and stabs her, killing her.

=== Allyson Nelson ===
- Portrayed by Andi Matichak
- Appears in: Halloween (2018), Halloween Kills, Halloween Ends
- Status: Alive

Allyson Nelson is the daughter of Ray and Karen Nelson. She is the granddaughter of Karen's mother and Ray's mother-in-law, Laurie Strode. She spends some time resenting her grandmother after her mother is killed by Michael, but is manipulated by her new boyfriend Corey until she learns that Corey was essentially Michael's apprentice.

=== Angus Taylor ===
- Portrayed by Arthur Malet
- Appears in: Halloween (1978)
- Status: Alive

Angus Taylor is the groundskeeper in the cemetery where Judith Myers is buried and leads Dr. Loomis to her grave, only to find the headstone stolen. In the novel, he briefly talks about Judith and mentions how he was shocked at the news of her murder and how a young boy like Michael Myers could commit such a horrible crime.

=== Annie Brackett ===
- Portrayed by Nancy Loomis (original timeline) and Danielle Harris (reboot timeline)
- Appears in: Halloween (1978), Halloween II (1981), Halloween: Resurrection (mentioned only), Halloween (2007), Halloween II (2009), Halloween (2018) (mentioned only), Halloween Kills (archival footage), Halloween Ends (photograph)
- Status: Deceased
- Died in: Halloween (1978) (original timeline) and Halloween II (2009) (reboot timeline)

Annie Brackett first appears is in the original Halloween film. She is one of Laurie Strode's best friends, and the daughter of Haddonfield's sheriff, Leigh Brackett. She is portrayed as having a very rebellious and sardonic personality. On Halloween night, she is babysitting Lindsey Wallace near Laurie, and the two friends gossip over the telephone throughout the evening. After leaving Lindsey with Laurie in order to go and meet her boyfriend Paul, Annie is murdered by Michael Myers, who strangles her in her car and slits her throat. Michael then sets up her corpse for Laurie to find, leaving her in the Wallaces' bed with Judith Myers' tombstone placed behind her body. Annie makes a cameo appearance in Halloween II as her father, Sheriff Brackett, closes her eyes as her corpse is being taken out of the house in a stretcher.

The character's more recent onscreen appearances occur in Rob Zombie's Halloween reboot and its sequel. As with the original, in the reboot, Annie is Laurie's sassy friend from high school and Lindsey's babysitter. However, her encounters with Michael Myers are different: walking home from school, she sees and cursingly threatens him from across the street, remarking that her 'daddy is the sheriff'. A few hours later, that Halloween night, she goes to leave Lindsey and her babysitting duties to Laurie in order to have a secret date with Paul, an older schoolmate (who did not make an onscreen appearance in the original film but is present in the remake), that soon arrives in his car and takes Annie back to Lindsey's house. There, Annie is kissing Paul while stopping his attempts to pull her sweater off, until she agrees and leaves herself topless. Preparing to have sex with Paul, Annie fails to see Michael nearing them until he attacks. While Paul is instantly killed, the frightened Annie makes a run for the front door, almost escaping, but is caught. Michael pulls her back inside, however, she manages to slip away and get a kitchen knife, attempting to face the towering killer. Her resistance quickly ends with Annie captured alive, exposed to Michael's crueler attacks; she is left lying on the floor brutally tortured and bleeding when Laurie brings Lindsey home, although her father finds her still alive some time later due to Laurie having called 9-1-1.

In the following sequel, Annie, although slightly disfigured with the scars from her near-fatal attack, is shown to be much more stable than Laurie, who is living with Annie and her father. On a Halloween night when she is at home alone, Michael breaks into the Brackett house, seizes the fleeing Annie then stabs her repeatedly off-screen. When she arrives home, Laurie finds Annie on the bathroom floor, naked and severely wounded by Michael. Annie then tries to persuade Laurie to leave the house, without success, until she dies.

== B ==
=== Barry Simms ===
- Portrayed by Leo Geter
- Appears in: Halloween: The Curse of Michael Myers
- Status: Deceased
- Died in: Halloween: The Curse of Michael Myers

Barry Simms, is the host of the radio show Back Talk. Barry was often rude to his callers, even ignoring Jamie Lloyd's call for help. Barry was killed by Michael, who stabbed Barry in the chest and hung his corpse from a tree. Simms was originally intended to be portrayed by and modeled after Howard Stern, who declined in order to appear in his own film Private Parts.

=== Sheriff Ben Meeker ===
- Portrayed by Beau Starr
- Appears in: Halloween 4: The Return of Michael Myers, Halloween 5: The Revenge of Michael Myers
- Status: Deceased
- Died in: Halloween 5: The Revenge of Michael Myers

Ben Meeker, is the father of Kelly Meeker, who becomes a victim at the hands of Michael Myers. Sheriff Ben Meeker is an integral part of Halloween 4, as he attempts to help Dr. Loomis find and destroy Michael. In the next installment, Ben Meeker returns but has less screen time than in the previous film, and once again attempts to help destroy Michael in order to protect Jamie Lloyd. Towards the end of the film, Michael is locked in a cell, however, a shoot out begins, which allows him to escape and kills Ben in the process.

=== Ben Tramer ===
- Portrayed by Jack Verbois
- Appears in: Halloween (1978) (mentioned only), Halloween II (1981), Halloween (2007) (mentioned only), Halloween Kills (mentioned only)
- Status: Deceased (original and H2O timeline)
  Alive (remake and 2018 timeline)
- Died in: Halloween II (1981)

Bennett Samuel "Ben" Tramer attends Haddonfield High School with Laurie Strode, Annie Brackett, Lynda Van der Klok, Paul Freedman and Bob Simms. It is revealed by Laurie in the original Halloween film that she has a crush on Ben when she tells Annie that she would like to go to the dance with him. Later in the film, Annie tells Laurie that she called Ben and told him, and that he was interested. However, Laurie is embarrassed by this and asks Annie to call him back and tell him that she was only kidding. But Annie tells Laurie that she would only consider doing so if she babysits Lindsey while she goes to pick up her boyfriend, to which Laurie agrees.

In the sequel, someone in a very similar but varied mask (the variation being that the hair attached to Ben's mask is blond and not brunette as Michael's mask is) as Michael Myers runs into the street without looking and gets hit by a squad car which pins him to another vehicle that bursts into flames, leading to his death. At the morgue, a dentist is unable to match the burnt victim's teeth to Michael's due to the body's state and a lack of resources. Later on, Ben's two friends Craig and Randy run up to Deputy Gary Hunt, who is standing in front of the old Myers house with Dr. Loomis, to report the Halloween mask-wearing Ben Tramer as being drunk after leaving a Halloween party and missing in action. This leads Dr. Loomis to believe the teenager was indeed the victim, and to suggest that the dentist should confirm this.

In Rob Zombie's 2007 remake of Halloween, Ben is said to have a crush on Laurie which is told to her by Annie.

In Halloween Kills, Ben is mentioned once again to be Laurie's high school crush by Deputy Frank Hawkins and in the sequel, it is revealed that he survived the events of Halloween night 1978 (due to the events of Halloween II never occurring in this timeline) and has a son named Robert and a grandson named Terry who is attending Haddonfield High School much like he did in his youth.

=== Bob Simms ===
- Portrayed by John Michael Graham (original timeline) and Nick Mennell (reboot timeline)
- Appears in: Halloween (1978), Halloween II (1981) (mentioned only), Halloween: Resurrection (mentioned only), Halloween (2007), Halloween (2018), Halloween Kills
- Status: Deceased
- Died in: Halloween (1978) (original timeline) and Halloween (2007) (reboot timeline)

Robert David "Bob" Simms is the boyfriend of Lynda Van Der Klok. After having sex with Lynda in the Wallace house, she asks him to go get her a beer and he does so. When he is in the kitchen, he hears a strange sound and thinks it is either Lynda, Annie, or Paul playing a joke on him. However, when he opens a closet door, Michael Myers jumps out and pins Bob to another door by stabbing him in the stomach. His scenes in the reboot are similar to the original's, although they happen in the old Myers house. In the uncut version of the 2007 film, Bob is stabbed to death by Michael as he attempts to get beer from his car.

=== Boyfriend of Judith Myers ===
- Portrayed by David Kyle
- Appears in: Halloween (1978)
- Status: Alive

The boyfriend of Judith Myers (portrayed by David Kyle). His name is never revealed and he only appears in the opening scene at Judith's house on Halloween (October 31, 1963). During this time, he makes out with Judith in the entry way and in her family's living room after she says "My parents won't be home until ten". At some point he gets the feeling that they're not alone. However, both are unaware that six-year-old Michael Myers is watching them through a window. He asks Judith if they are alone and she replies "Umm... Michael's around here some place". While Judith briefly looks around the living room for Michael, her boyfriend picks up Michael's clown mask and starts goofing around which distracts Judith from her babysitting duty. Eventually he and Judith go upstairs to have sex. After they have sex, he tells Judith that it is getting late and that he has to go. At the last minute Judith asks him to call her the next day and he promises to do so. While all of this takes place, unbeknownst to him, Michael is hiding from behind a wall and peeking around the corner waiting to see when the boyfriend will leave. Once he does, Michael walks up the stairs and murders Judith. The boyfriend is never seen or mentioned again in the film. In the novelization of the original film, his name is Danny. It is also revealed that he 'came within an ace of being accused' of Judith's murder but there was no evidence, resulting in Michael rightfully being charged.

=== Brady ===
- Portrayed by Sasha Jenson
- Appears in: Halloween 4: The Return of Michael Myers
- Status: Deceased
- Died in: Halloween 4: The Return of Michael Myers

Brady is the boyfriend of Rachel Carruthers. When he was told by Rachel that their date was off because she had to babysit Jamie Lloyd, he decided to spend the evening with Kelly Meeker. During a scene when Rachel takes Jamie trick or treating, they stop at the Meeker family home and Rachel finds out that Brady is cheating on her with Kelly. Later in the film, Rachel tells Brady that Jamie is the niece of Michael Myers. Brady eventually becomes one of Michael Myers' murder victims when Michael lifts him up and crushes his skull with bare hands while he tries to protect Rachel and Jamie.

=== Bucky ===
- Portrayed by Harlow Marks
- Appears in: Halloween 4: The Return of Michael Myers
- Status: Deceased
- Died in: Halloween 4: The Return of Michael Myers

Bucky was a worker who encountered Michael Myers as he wandered around an electrical power plant. Bucky told Michael that he was not permitted on the grounds. Seeing that Michael would not leave, the technician told him to stay where he was and not move while he walked towards the building. However, Michael did not listen and picked Bucky up and threw him into one of the electrical towers. The murder caused a blackout in Haddonfield, Illinois.

=== Budd Scarlotti ===
- Portrayed by Leo Rossi
- Appears in: Halloween II (1981)
- Status: Deceased
- Died in: Halloween II (1981)

Budd Scarlotti works in Haddonfield Memorial Hospital as an ambulance driver. He is murdered when he gets out of the therapeutic hot tub he and nurse Karen are using to fool around in to check on the temperature at her request but is strangled to death by Michael Myers.

== C ==
=== Cameron Elam ===
- Portrayed by Dylan Arnold
- Appears in: Halloween (2018), Halloween Kills
- Status: Deceased
- Died in: Halloween Kills

Cameron Elam is the son of Lonnie Elam. Best friends with Oscar, and dates Allyson Nelson, the granddaughter of Laurie Strode. She finds him cheating on her at a school-sponsored Halloween party, and trashing her phone when it rings again as she is confronting him. After leaving the dance, he finds the wounded Frank Hawkins, and saves his life. He makes up with Allyson shortly afterwards, and they, along with Cameron's father, Lonnie, join Tommy Doyle in hunting Michael Myers. After going into the Myers house, where the three of them tracked Michael to, Lonnie and Cameron are killed by Michael.

=== Charlie Bowles ===
- Appears in: Halloween (1978) (mentioned only)
- Status: Alive

Charlie Bowles is an unseen character in the franchise. He was mentioned by the groundskeeper who worked at the cemetery where Judith Myers was buried. After the groundskeeper expressed how shocked he was fifteen years ago when Michael Myers murdered Judith, he began telling Dr. Samuel Loomis an equally shocking story about Charlie Bowles, who had been a resident of the nearby town Russellville. The groundskeeper said that Charlie had excused himself from dinner and went out to the garage. He then returned with a hacksaw and kissed his wife and two children goodbye. However, the groundskeeper's story ends abruptly when Dr. Loomis interrupts him and reminds him that he needs to find Judith Myers' gravesite.

=== Conal Cochran ===
- Portrayed by Dan O'Herlihy
- Appears in: Halloween III: Season of the Witch
- Status: Deceased
- Died in: Halloween III: Season of the Witch

Conal Cochran is the owner of Silver Shamrock Novelties and devises a plan to kill children using his popular Halloween masks. At the end of the film, he is vaporized by the Stonehenge rune he was using to create his masks.

Professor Nicholas Rogers describes Conal Cochran as "the ultimate Halloween sadist, the malevolent predator on the lives of innocent children, transforming their masks into deadly weapons of destruction".

=== Corey Cunningham ===
- Portrayed by Rohan Campbell
- Appears in: Halloween Ends
- Status: Deceased
- Died in: Halloween Ends

Corey Cunningham was originally an aspiring engineer, but his life changed forever when he accidentally killed young Jeremy Allen a year after Michael Myers rampaged through the town. The incident's aftermath saw Corey being subjected to hostile behavior from the citizens of Haddonfield, until saved by Laurie from bullies where he befriends Allyson, forming a strong bond. Consequently, he embarked on a dark and sinister path that ended up escalating when he encountered Michael Myers; this encounter would fully unleash the evil and hate inside of Corey, who ends up taking up Michael's murderous mantle in the process on Halloween. He ends up taking revenge against his tormentors and later stabs himself with his knife after a failed assassination of Laurie in her home. His surviving moments was wrestling a knife away from Michael who snaps his neck, killing him.

=== Cynthia Strode ===
- Portrayed by Dee Wallace
- Appears in: Halloween (2007), Halloween II (2009)
- Status: Deceased
- Died in: Halloween (2007)

Cynthia Strode is the adoptive mother of Laurie Strode in the remake. Mrs. Strode appears to be a loving mother and is sincerely disappointed with Laurie's crude humor from earlier in the day (before Halloween). She and her husband Mason Strode are longtime inhabitants of Haddonfield and know much about the town's affairs. Both Cynthia and Mason become two of Michael Myers' murder victims early on that evening. After Michael outright kills Mason, he pursues Cynthia further into the residence and locates a picture of Laurie in the family study. Cynthia figures that the man attacking her is really after her adopted daughter, and she exclaims, "No, not my baby!" Cynthia Strode dies soon after Michael breaks her neck.

== D ==
=== Dr. Daniel "Dan" Challis ===
- Portrayed by Tom Atkins
- Appears in: Halloween III: Season of the Witch
- Status: Unknown

Dr. Daniel "Dan" Challis is a hardworking doctor struggling with the relationships between him and his ex-wife, as well as his children. On October 23, a man named Harry Grimbridge is brought into the hospital where Dan works, trembling with fear and clutching a jack-o'-lantern mask. Harry is killed that night by an unidentified man who then goes to his car and immolates himself. The next day, Dan is confronted in a bar by Harry's daughter, Ellie. He tells her about the strange events of the night before and shows her the mask her father was holding when he was admitted to the hospital.

Along with Ellie, Dan traces the mask back to Silver Shamrock Novelties, a company based in the town of Santa Mira. While in Santa Mira, Ellie mysteriously disappears and Dan is captured by Conal Cochran's android henchmen. Dan discovers Cochran's plan to kill millions of children on Halloween night using his masks. He finds out that the Silver Shamrock trademarks on every mask contain a computer chip and a small fragment of Stonehenge. On Halloween night, a television commercial will air activating the computer chip causing the mask wearer's heads to dissolve and erupt with insects and snakes. Cochran shows this to Dan in a demonstration, in which he kills a family.

Dan eventually escapes captivity in Cochran's factory and rescues someone he believes to be Ellie. He destroys Cochran and the factory by dumping the Silver Shamrock trademarks throughout the building and airing the commercial which will activate the computer chips inside. However, when he is returning home, he is attacked by the android which he thought was Ellie. After an intense fight, he kills the android with a tire iron and runs to a nearby gas station where he tries to convince the station managers not to air the Silver Shamrock commercial. He persuades them to take it off channels one and two, but not channel three. At the end of the film, he is seen yelling, "Turn it off! Stop it! Stop it!", although it is seemingly too late for him to prevent the computer chips being activated. His ultimate fate is left unknown.

=== Danny Strode ===
- Portrayed by Devin Gardner
- Appears in: Halloween: The Curse of Michael Myers
- Status: Alive

Danny Strode is the six-year-old son of Kara Strode, and lives in the Myers house with his mother, uncle, and grandparents. Danny's grandfather John is abusive towards him and his mother, referring to Danny as a "bastard". Danny sleeps in Michael Myers' old bedroom and is being taunted by the "Man in Black", who is the leader of a druid cult, saying "Kill for him". As a result, he draws violent pictures including the Mark of Thorn, symbolizing an ancient druid curse that was inflicted on Michael by this cult. On Halloween, he is befriended by Tommy Doyle, who lives across the street from him. Tommy warns Kara of the danger she and her family are in if they remain in the Myers house, and is proven right when Michael massacres the other Strodes. Danny was to be the next child inflicted with the curse of Thorn, but is seated away in the meantime while the man in black Dr. Terence Wynn and a team of surgeons perform a medical procedure in the operating room. This is interrupted when Michael bursts into the operating room at the last minute slaughtering Dr. Wynn's staff and possibly Wynn as well. Danny later helps his mother and Tommy protect Jamie Lloyd's newborn son Stephen from Michael and Dr. Wynn and his staff at Smith's Grove Sanitarium. The four survive the night, and leave Smith's Grove at the end of the film. Danny Strode is also the adoptive first cousin once removed of Laurie Strode, the maternal second cousin of Jamie Lloyd, and the second cousin twice removed or third cousin of Laurie Strode's grandson and Jamie Lloyd's son, Steven Lloyd.

=== Darlene Carruthers ===
- Portrayed by Karen Alston
- Appears in: Halloween 4: The Return of Michael Myers, Halloween 5: The Revenge of Michael Myers
- Status: Alive

Darlene Carruthers is the foster mother of Jamie Lloyd and biological mother of Rachel Carruthers. At the end of the film, she is stabbed with scissors by Jamie Lloyd in an eerily similar manner to the night when Michael Myers murdered his sister Judith. It is revealed in a flashback in the following film that she survives the attack.

=== Dawn Thompson ===
- Portrayed by Hildur Ruriks
- Appears in: Halloween: The Curse of Michael Myers
- Status: Alive

Dawn Thompson is the secretary of Dr. Terence Wynn and a member of the Cult of Thorn. Her role in the theatrical cut is minor, however she appears at the Thorn ceremony in the Producer's Cut of the film.

=== Deborah Myers ===
- Portrayed by Sheri Moon Zombie
- Appears in: Halloween (2007), Halloween II (2009)
- Status: Deceased
- Died in: Halloween (2007)

Deborah Myers, is the mother of Judith and Michael Myers, as well as the biological mother of Laurie Strode (née Angel Myers). Deborah does not know that her son is mentally unstable, nor that he kills animals as a habit. While working at a strip club, Michael kills her abusive boyfriend, Ronnie, Judith, and Judith's boyfriend, Steve. After this, Michael is put into custody and Deborah later witnesses him attacking and killing a nurse. When she returns home, Deborah becomes severely depressed due to Michael's behavior and commits suicide by shooting herself while watching old home movies of Michael, resulting in Laurie's adoption by the Strodes. Her role in Halloween II is slightly larger than her previous one. In the film, she appears as an apparition with a white horse, and is only seen through Laurie and Michael's visions.

=== Deirdre ===
- Appears in the novel: Halloween (1979) by Curtis Richards

Deirdre was a 15-year-old Druid princess who lived in northern Ireland during the time of the ancient Celtic race. She was the third and youngest daughter of the Druid Chief Gwynwyll and an unnamed queen. She was said to have been very beautiful as she had sand colored hair, sea green eyes, white cream skin and lips as red as wild rose. She was also said to have been taller than her older sisters. It was also revealed that she was the love of a disfigured boy her age named Enda, who once tried to profess his love to her while she was collecting water from a small stream near their village; Startled by Enda's approach, she almost fell into the stream. Enda attempted to save her, lunging forward to grab her, but she misread his attempt and cowered down in fear before screaming that he was trying to rape her, before finally fleeing back to the village. Later, the Chieftain announced his daughter was betrothed to a young warrior named Cullain. On the night of Samhain, Deirdre and her husband to be were dancing around the bonfire at the joy of their betrothal. Enda watched them with a blade in his hand, as what Deirdre said to him earlier broke his heart so much that his madness became an affliction and he now vowed to murder them. As they danced right next to him, he slit Cullain's Jugular while Deirdre had her head turned, then stabbed her in the chest and breasts, killing her. Immediately after their deaths, Enda was chased down and torn apart limb from limb by a crowd of the enraged villagers. The next day, Enda's eternal soul was cursed by the Chieftain's shaman as punishment for his evil actions.

- In the film Halloween II (1981), Michael Myers breaks into Haddonfield Elementary School. While in a classroom, Michael writes Samhain in blood on the chalkboard. Later on, the police and Dr. Loomis enter the school and examine what Michael wrote. Dr. Loomis does his best to explain to the police what Samhain means.

== E ==
=== Earl Ford ===
- Portrayed by Gene Ross
- Appears in Halloween 4: The Return of Michael Myers
- Status: Deceased
- Died in: Halloween 4: The Return of Michael Myers

Earl Ford works as a bartender in Haddonfield, Illinois and becomes angry when he hears on a news station that Michael Myers has returned and that all businesses should close for the night. Earl and other local men band together and try to locate Michael so that they can kill him. However, they never find Michael, but they do find Jamie and Rachel and attempt to get them out of Haddonfield. Meeting up with the Illinois State Police en route to Haddonfield, who direct them to a highway patrol substation up the road where they will be safe, they think it is over, but Michael ambushes Earl and the other lynch mob members with him. Michael murders Earl by ripping out his throat, leaving Rachel to try and save herself and Jamie by driving Earl's truck after throwing his corpse from the driver's seat.

=== Edith Myers ===
- Appears in Halloween (1978), Halloween II (1981) (mentioned only), Halloween: Resurrection
- Status: Deceased

Edith Myers is the name of Michael Myers and Judith Myers' mother according to the Halloween novelization from 1979 by Curtis Richards (a pseudonym used by author Richard Curtis). In the novelization it does not say that she is the biological mother of Laurie Strode since this was not revealed until the film's sequel premiered in 1981. It also mentions that sometime after Judith's death, she and her husband moved away to Indiana due to the media frenzy and rude stares they received from other townspeople. It goes on to mention that they continue to make payments on the house which has not been sold after the death of their eldest daughter.

Michael's mother could be seen briefly in the original Halloween after Judith's murder. She is seen with her husband after they find Michael holding the knife outside the family home. The mother stares at Michael, apparently in shock. After this scene in the original, the parents are never seen again. It is not until the release of Halloween II (1981) that the absence of Mr. and Mrs. Myers is explained. In the sequel, nurse Marion Chambers tells Dr. Loomis that two years after Judith's death (1963), Mr. and Mrs. Myers died (1965) and Laurie Strode was eventually adopted by the Strodes. Mrs. Myers is also the grandmother of Jamie Lloyd and John Tate, the latter only in H20 and Resurrection. She is also the great-grandmother of Stephen.

In the sequel, Halloween II, Michael broke into the elementary school and drew a picture of his parents together with his sister, Judith. He left the drawing behind after he used a butcher knife to stab his drawing of Judith. It was discovered by the police and brought to the attention of his psychiatrist, Samuel Loomis, who briefly examined it. This occurred before Dr. Loomis learned that Laurie Strode was Michael and Judith's younger sister.

The comic "The First Death of Laurie Strode" also uses this name – Edith appears pregnant in a flashback scene in which a young Michael fantasises about killing his unborn sibling.

=== Ellie Grimbridge ===
- Portrayed by Stacey Nelkin
- Appears in Halloween III: Season of the Witch
- Status: Deceased
- Died in: Halloween III: Season of the Witch

Ellie is the love interest of Dan Challis who assisted him in visiting Santa Mira, the homeplace of Silver Shamrock in search of her missing father. In the climax, she is killed and replaced by a robotic version who attempted to kill Challis until destroyed.

=== Enda ===
- Appears in the novel: Halloween (1979) by Curtis Richards

Enda is a cursed ghost that is behind Michael Myers affliction. Originally, he was a 15-year-old boy who lived in northern Ireland, thousands of years ago, during the time of the ancient Druids. He was apparently somewhat disfigured, as he had one skinnier arm and a twitching mouth due to the midwives botching his birth. He was also passionately in love with Princess Deirdre (Chief Gwynwyll's daughter). His father, brother, other kinsman, and uncle all cruelly mocked him for this, but when the Chieftain announced that his daughter became available for marriage, Enda took this opportunity to profess his love for Deirdre (believing he had a chance with her because his intentions were pure). However, a few days before Samhain, Enda attempted to tell her while she was collecting water from the small stream near their village. When he approached her, he startled her and she almost fell in the stream, Enda lunged forward amid trying to save her, but she cowered and screamed believing he was trying to rape her before running back to the village. This broke his heart so much that his love for her was replaced by hatred. On the night of Samhain, Deirdre was betrothed to a young warrior named Cullain and this fact only intensified the primal feeling of now afflicting Enda. During the mass celebration, in silence, he picked up a foot-long blade used for slaughtering livestock and waited by a bonfire for his opportunity to strike. Enda killed Cullain first by swiftly walking up behind him with the blade and stabbing him through the jugular several times, then subsequently killed Deirdre by brutally hacking and stabbing her torso. Enraged, the villagers who witnessed the horrible act almost immediately began to chase Enda and convened upon him, where the mob tore his body apart limb from limb, leaving only his heart and skull. On the next day, the 2nd day of Samhain, Chief Gwynwyll buried his daughter and her lover, then had a shaman take Enda's remains to the top of a mountain to perform a curse on his eternal soul before burying the remains in the “Field of Fiends”. The shaman placed a curse on Enda's soul, in which he was forced to wander the land until the end of time, becoming a ghost-like entity and inhabiting the bodies of different individuals throughout history, doomed to forever repeat the same brutal actions from that night upon scores of innocent souls for eternity. Over time, his ghost would wreak havoc throughout the ages, responsible for massacres abroad. Finally, on Halloween night of 1963, in Haddonfield Illinois, 6 year-old Michael Myers became afflicted with Enda's vengeful spirit, then murdered his sister and her lover. 15 years later, in 1978, he would escape incarceration and brutally slay 5 people, donning a white mask and a foot-long kitchen knife.

- In the film Halloween II (1981), Michael Myers breaks into Haddonfield Elementary School. While in a classroom, Michael writes Samhain in blood on the chalkboard. Later on, the police and Dr. Loomis enter the school and examine what Michael wrote. Dr. Loomis does his best to explain to the police what Samhain means.
- The explanation for Michael's drive to kill and immortality from the novel apparently became inspiration for a similar cause in Halloween: The Curse of Michael Myers but without mentioning Enda, instead incorporating the curse of Thorn and the inclusion of an evil cult that brought the curse to him.

== F ==
=== Deputy Frank Hawkins ===
- Portrayed by Will Patton, Thomas Mann (young)
- Appears in: Halloween (2018), Halloween Kills, Halloween Ends
- Status: Alive

Frank Hawkins is a Sheriff's Deputy who teams up with Laurie in an effort to kill Michael once and for all. It is revealed that he arrested Michael following his killing spree in 1978, and prevented Samuel Loomis from killing Michael and instead had him brought into custody. He comes to view this as a mistake and is willing to finish Michael off by any means necessary. After impacting Michael with his car, he pulls out a gun, ready to shoot Michael, but he is attacked by Michael's psychologist, Dr. Ranbir Sartain. He survives, and is placed in the same hospital room as Laurie Strode, who is recovering from her encounter with Michael.

=== Dr. Frederick Mixter ===
- Portrayed by Ford Rainey
- Appears in: Halloween II (1981)
- Status: Deceased
- Died in: Halloween II (1981)

Dr. Frederick Mixter is the doctor who examines Laurie Strode when she arrives at Haddonfield Memorial Hospital. He is later found dead in his office with a needle sticking out of his eye by nurse Janet.

== G ==
=== Bernard Garrett ===
- Portrayed by Cliff Emmich
- Appears in: Halloween II (1981)
- Status: Deceased
- Died in: Halloween II (1981)

Mr. Garrett is the security guard that works at Haddonfield Memorial Hospital. As he checks the hospital's storage room for possible breaking and entering, he is killed by Michael Myers with a hammer claw to his skull.

=== Deputy Gary Hunt ===
- Portrayed by Hunter von Leer
- Appears in: Halloween II (1981)
- Status: Alive

Deputy Gary Hunt works with Dr. Loomis after Sheriff Leigh Brackett goes off duty upon hearing the news of his daughter's death. It is revealed that he grew up in Haddonfield when he and Dr. Loomis are in front of the old Myers house. During that scene, Dr. Loomis mentions the murder of Judith Myers and Deputy Gary Hunt says "I remember. I was sixteen years old".

== H ==
=== Harry Grimbridge ===
- Portrayed by Al Berry
- Appears in: Halloween III: Season of the Witch
- Status: Deceased
- Died in: Halloween III: Season of the Witch

Harold Grimbridge is a mask owner turned victim of Conal Cochran's androids. His daughter Ellie seeks answers after his death leading to Silver Shamrock.

=== Dr. Hoffman ===
- Portrayed by Michael Pataki
- Appears in: Halloween 4: The Return of Michael Myers
- Status: Alive

Dr. Hoffman works at the asylum where Michael had been a patient after the events that took place on Halloween 1978. He oversees Michael's transfer back to Smith's Grove Sanitarium and the following day has a heated discussion with Dr. Loomis. Later on, Dr. Hoffman is with Dr. Loomis at the crash site where Michael escaped from the ambulance. During that scene, Dr. Loomis tells Dr. Hoffman, "If you don't find him in four hours, I'm sure I will".

== J ==
=== Jamie Lloyd ===
- Portrayed by Danielle Harris (4 & 5) and J. C. Brandy (The Curse of Michael Myers)
- Appears in: Halloween 4: The Return of Michael Myers, Halloween 5: The Revenge of Michael Myers, Halloween: The Curse of Michael Myers
- Status: Deceased
- Died in: Halloween: The Curse of Michael Myers

Jamie Lloyd is Laurie Strode's daughter, as well as the niece of Michael Myers and Judith Myers, of which she is aware. Her father is unknown since her surname was never explained or elaborated in films where it came from when she appeared. She is put in the care of a foster family, the Carruthers, and later adopted after Laurie apparently dies in a car crash. In Halloween 5, she has a psychic link with her Uncle Michael, cannot speak in the beginning but eventually regains the ability to speak, and has seizures whenever her uncle kills someone. In Halloween: The Curse of Michael Myers, she gives birth to a son possibly fathered by her Uncle Michael and named Stephen. She is ultimately murdered by Michael, and her son Stephen is protected by Tommy Doyle.

Jamie Lloyd and her son, Stephen, are never mentioned in Halloween H20: 20 Years Later since this film is set in alternate continuity, following from the first two films.

Jamie Lloyd is the granddaughter of Mr. and Mrs. Myers.

=== Janet Marshall ===
- Portrayed by Ana Alicia
- Appears in: Halloween II (1981)
- Status: Deceased
- Died in: Halloween II (1981)

Janet Marshall works as a nurse in Haddonfield Memorial Hospital. She dies when Michael Myers unknowingly creeps up from behind her and inserts a syringe into her right temple killing her.

=== Jill ===
- Portrayed by Tawny Moyer
- Appears in: Halloween II (1981)
- Status: Deceased
- Died in: Halloween II (1981)

Jill Franco is a nurse who works at Haddonfield Memorial Hospital. She dies when Michael Myers stabs her in the back with a scalpel.

=== Jimmy ===
- Portrayed by Lance Guest
- Appears in: Halloween II (1981)
- Status: Unknown

Jimmy is a young EMT at Haddonfield Memorial Hospital who becomes attracted to Laurie Strode when she is brought in after being first attacked by Michael Myers. As Michael tracks Laurie to the hospital and begins murdering the staff, Laurie disappears from her room. Jimmy and Nurse Jill search the empty building for Laurie and their missing colleagues, with Jimmy eventually finding Mrs. Alves' dead body; he accidentally slips on her blood, hitting his head and leaving himself unconscious. He reunites with Laurie towards the end of the film, but falls unconscious once again, due to his earlier head injury. It is unknown whether he lives or dies; however, the version of the film shown on television includes a deleted scene in which he survives.

=== John Tate ===
- Portrayed by Josh Hartnett
- Appears in: Halloween H20: 20 Years Later, Halloween: Resurrection
- Status: Alive

John Tate is the son of Laurie Strode. His father is unknown. He is the nephew of Michael Myers and Judith Myers. He attends Hillcrest Academy, a boarding school where his mother is the headmistress. He is the only one who knows his mother's true identity after she faked her own death and assumed the name Keri Tate in order to escape her brother, Michael Myers. However, he is also tired of her over-protectiveness and paranoia, and starts to rebel against her authority. He pretends to attend a school trip to Yosemite, but in fact remains at Hillcrest and throws a Halloween party with his friends and his girlfriend, Molly. Michael shows up and murders John's friends before attacking his nephew. John suffers a stab wound to the thigh, but he and Molly escape the school with Laurie's help. In Halloween: Resurrection, John appears briefly in a photograph kept by Laurie, who is put in a mental institution, but his mother is later killed by her brother.

Originally, the screenplay written by Kevin Williamson contained family connection between John Tate and Jamie Lloyd where they are depicted as a brother and sister and overall as Laurie's children. However, with change in new writers and director, the screenplay was modified where movies from 4-6 were ignored, thereby deleting Jamie Lloyd from the story.

His grandparents are Mr. and Mrs. Myers.

=== John Strode ===
- Portrayed by Bradford English
- Appears in: Halloween: The Curse of Michael Myers
- Status: Deceased
- Died in: Halloween: The Curse of Michael Myers

John Strode is the alcoholic and abusive husband of Debra Strode, father of Tim and Kara, grandfather of Danny, and Morgan Strode's brother. He is killed when Michael impales him on a fuse box. After a minute of excruciating electrocution, his head explodes. John is also the adoptive uncle of Laurie Strode and the maternal great-uncle of Jamie Lloyd.

=== Judith Myers ===
- Portrayed by Sandy Johnson (original timeline) and Hanna R. Hall (reboot timeline)
- Appears in: Halloween (1978), Halloween II (1981) (mentioned only), Halloween: The Curse of Michael Myers (mentioned only), Halloween H20: 20 Years Later (mentioned only), Halloween: Resurrection (mentioned only), Halloween (2007), Halloween II (2009), Halloween (2018), Halloween Kills (mentioned only)
- Status: Deceased
- Died in: Halloween (1978) (original timeline) and Halloween (2007) (reboot timeline)

Judith Margaret Myers, also known simply as Judy (November 10, 1947 – October 31, 1963; according to the headstone in John Carpenter's film), is the older sister of Michael Myers, as well as the biological sister of Laurie Strode. She was a victim of sororicide at the age of fifteen (10 days shy of sixteen). In Halloween H20: 20 Years Later, Keri Tate/Laurie Strode reveals to her boyfriend that her sister Judith was seventeen years old when she died. This was incorrect and most likely written in the script so that it would correlate with Laurie's age when Michael tried to murder her in 1978 and Laurie's son John's age in the present setting of 1998. Her murderer was her brother Michael, aged six.

Judith is only featured briefly in the opening scene. However, in the opening scene, she does imply that she is responsible for babysitting Michael and is notable for being Michael's first murder victim. The opening scene begins with her brother Michael standing outside of the Myers residence and watching her through a window making out with her boyfriend in the family living room. While in the living room, Judith's boyfriend asks if they are alone; Judith replies "Ummm... Michael's around some place". She then turns her head and quickly scans the room. While doing that, her boyfriend picks up Michael's clown mask that was lying around and leans into Judith's face when she turns to face him. This makes Judith laugh and distracts her, causing her to forget all about Michael. Her boyfriend then suggests that they go upstairs to have sex and Judith agrees. Michael watches Judith and her boyfriend trot up the stairs. He then moves to the front of the house and looks up at Judith's bedroom window only to see her light go off. At that time, he walks through the back door and into the kitchen, opens a drawer, and pulls out a large butcher knife. Michael then waits for the boyfriend to leave. Once the boyfriend leaves, he goes upstairs and enters Judith's bedroom where she is seen sitting in front of her vanity, brushing her hair and singing to herself. Michael stands directly behind Judith who notices Michael in her vanity mirror; she turns around and says "Michael!" in an annoyed voice. Michael stabs her repeatedly in the abdomen. She falls off her chair and onto the floor, and dies. Michael leaves her bedroom and walks out the front door. When he is outside, the parents arrive home to find Michael holding a knife and he is sent to Smith's Grove Sanitarium for the crime.

Fifteen years later (1978), after escaping from the sanitarium, the adult Michael steals Judith's gravestone and places it behind Annie Brackett's corpse. Also, many of the children from Haddonfield believe that the old Myers house is haunted because Judith died there. Although Judith does not appear in any of the Halloween sequels, her death is repeatedly mentioned by other characters in other installments of the Halloween film series, and her final moments before her murder were reenacted by her niece Jamie Lloyd in Halloween 5: The Revenge of Michael Myers in order to lure Michael back to his abandoned childhood home.

She has a larger role in Rob Zombie's Halloween. She is still the older sister of Michael and Laurie whose name is Angel Myers. She verbally abuses Michael in several scenes and interacts with her boyfriend, Steve Haley, until Michael murders them both on Halloween. However, Michael's idolization of Judith was transferred to his mother, Deborah, in the remake. Also, Judith's boyfriend mistakenly calls Ronnie White her father. Judith replies by saying he is not her father and that her biological father is in Heaven. Unlike in the original film, Judith was not Michael's first murder victim. She died as a result of being stabbed multiple times with a butcher knife and her murder was much bloodier than it was in the original. It involved a chase scene in which a wounded Judith exits her bedroom and walks down the hallway while Michael follows her and further slashes her until she collapses, dying.

== K ==
=== Kara Strode ===
- Portrayed by Marianne Hagan
- Appears in: Halloween: The Curse of Michael Myers
- Status: Alive

Kara Strode is a cousin of Laurie Strode and a first cousin once removed of Jamie Lloyd. She lives in the Myers house with her parents John and Debra Strode, her brother Tim, and her son Danny. Kara meets Tommy Doyle, who warns her about Michael Myers, before finding her family murdered. She is then kidnapped by the supposed Thorn cult who possibly planned to use her for their genetic experiments involving in-vitro fertilization, but is soon rescued by Tommy.

Originally, Kara's fate varied in various script drafts. In the first draft, Kara is murdered by her son Danny in the Haddonfield Bus Depot, while the near final draft had the film ending with Tommy and Kara driving away. The film as released ends with Kara and Tommy driving off with the children, Danny and Stephen.

=== Karen Bailey ===
- Portrayed by Pamela Susan Shoop
- Appears in: Halloween II (1981)
- Status: Deceased
- Died in: Halloween II (1981)

Karen Bailey is employed as a nurse at Haddonfield Memorial Hospital. She dies after spending time with Budd in the therapeutic hot tub when Michael holds her head under the scalding water.

=== Karen Nelson ===
- Portrayed by Judy Greer
- Appears in: Halloween (2018), Halloween Kills, Halloween Ends (archival footage, photograph, mentioned)
- Status: Deceased
- Died in: Halloween Kills

Karen Nelson is the daughter of Laurie Strode and the wife of Ray Nelson. She is also the mother of Allyson Nelson, who is Laurie's granddaughter. At the end of the movie, she, Laurie, and Allyson together all seemingly kill Michael by setting the house on fire. In Halloween Kills, she finds out that he survived, and she goes to the Myers house at the end of the film and is suddenly attacked and killed by Michael with a knife.

=== Keith ===
- Portrayed by Adam Hollander
- Appears in: Halloween (1978)
- Status: Alive

Keith is a follower of Lonnie Elam and bullies Tommy Doyle.

=== Kelly Meeker ===
- Portrayed by Kathleen Kinmont
- Appears in: Halloween 4: The Return of Michael Myers
- Status: Deceased
- Died in: Halloween 4: The Return of Michael Myers

Kelly Meeker was the daughter of Sheriff Ben Meeker and was murdered by Michael Myers when he thrust a shotgun into her abdomen, pinning her against a door.

== L ==
=== Laurie Strode ===
- Portrayed by Jamie Lee Curtis (excluding reboot timeline) and Scout Taylor-Compton (reboot timeline)
- Appears in: Halloween (1978), Halloween II (1981), Halloween III: Season of the Witch, Halloween 4: The Return of Michael Myers, Halloween 5: The Revenge of Michael Myers (mentioned only), Halloween: The Curse of Michael Myers (mentioned only), Halloween H20: 20 Years Later, Halloween: Resurrection, Halloween (2007), Halloween II (2009), Halloween (2018), Halloween Kills, Halloween Ends
- Status: Alive (excluding original timeline) / Deceased (original timeline)
- Died in: Halloween: Resurrection

Laurie Strode is a high school student in the original film that Michael stalks after she drops off a key at his former house, so her father can sell it. This character returns in Halloween II, Halloween: H20, Halloween Resurrection, 2018's Halloween and its sequel Halloween Kills. Michael succeeds in murdering Laurie in Halloween Resurrection. Halloween II and its later installments would portray Laurie as Michael Myers' and Judith Myers' younger sister. In Halloween II, Laurie says she does know that she was adopted and has a few dreams that offer vague insights into her real identity. The first dream she has is of when she was a little girl, with her adoptive mother saying with a tone of annoyance "I'm not your real mother! Stop asking me questions!" The second dream shows her walking into a large room where a pre-teen Michael is seen sitting in a chair and turning to look at her. When she does find out that she is being stalked by Michael Myers, she asks "Why me?!" It is revealed in Halloween: H20 that she had learned of her relation to the Myers family sometime after the sequel, as she tells her boyfriend that she is the younger sister of Michael Myers and Judith Myers, which led her to change her name to Keri Tate so that her brother could not find her. She is the mother of Jamie Lloyd and John Tate, the latter one only in H20 and Resurrection. She is the grandmother of Stephen Lloyd from Halloween: The Curse of Michael Myers.

2018's Halloween reboot disregards her as the sister of Michael Myers and establishes her as the mother turned survivalist of Karen Strode and grandmother of Allyson Nelson.

Laurie Strode in Rob Zombie's version of Halloween is revealed to be the younger sister of Michael Myers, which she discovers in the following film, Halloween II. Her name before being adopted by the Strodes was Angel Myers and she was nicknamed "Boo" by a young Michael.

According to the information provided by Marion Chambers in the sequel Halloween II (1981) with regards to Laurie Strode's true identity, she was two years old in 1963 at the time of Judith's death and Michael's institutionalization in Smith's Grove – Warren County Sanitarium. Laurie Strode most likely would have been born some time in the year 1961.

=== Sheriff Leigh Brackett ===
- Portrayed by Charles Cyphers (original timeline) and Brad Dourif (reboot timeline)
- Appears in: Halloween (1978), Halloween II (1981), Halloween 4: The Return of Michael Myers (mentioned only), Halloween (2007), Halloween II (2009), Halloween Kills
- Status: Alive (reboot timeline) / Deceased (original timeline)
- Died in: Halloween Kills

Sheriff Leigh Brackett is the Haddonfield sheriff who is contacted by Dr. Loomis about his former patient Michael Myers, who has escaped from Smith's Grove and returned home. The two begin their search at Michael's house, where Loomis tries to warn the skeptical sheriff of the danger Myers poses, explaining that Michael is pure evil and capable of further violence, despite years of catatonia. Sheriff Brackett patrols the streets while Loomis waits and watches the house, expecting Michael to return there. Loomis' prediction comes true, as Brackett's daughter Annie becomes one of Michael's victims. Sheriff Brackett also appears in the sequel, Halloween II, once again played by Cyphers. In the film, while with Loomis, Brackett receives news of the death of his daughter, Annie. Blaming Loomis for her death, Sheriff Brackett goes home to tell his wife about it, leaving Deputy Gary Hunt in charge to help Loomis. Brackett is referenced in Halloween 4, in which an officer tells Loomis that Brackett retired in 1981 and moved to St. Petersburg, Florida, his position being taken over by Sheriff Ben Meeker. Brackett returns in Halloween Kills, reuniting with Tommy Doyle while expressing worry about attempts to form a mob to try to hunt down Michael. Ultimately, after the mob seemingly kills Michael, he arises to take down the mob piece by piece, with Brackett having his throat slit open by Myers.

Brackett did not appear in another Halloween film until Rob Zombie's remake, in which he is played by Brad Dourif. In this version of the story, Sheriff Lee Brackett is directly responsible for the adoption of Michael Myers' baby sister by the Strode family, having taken the child away following her mother's suicide. His daughter Annie survives Michael's killing spree, and he discovers her half-naked and tortured following Michael's attack. In the sequel to the remake, Halloween II, Sheriff Brackett has brought Laurie to live with him and Annie after the events of the previous film. Halfway through the film, Brackett tries to locate Laurie and tell her that she is Michael's sister before she finds out from Dr. Loomis' book, but he is too late. After receiving a 911 call from his home, he finds his daughter's body following Michael's rampage. As in the original film's sequel, Brackett angrily blames Loomis for Annie's death and Laurie's jeopardy. Brackett later uses a rifle to shoot Michael after Dr. Loomis lures Michael into view, which leads to Michael's death at the hands of Laurie.

=== Lindsey Wallace ===
- Portrayed by Kyle Richards (original timeline), Leslie L. Rohland (Thorn timeline) and Jenny Gregg Stewart (reboot timeline)
- Appears in: Halloween (1978), Halloween II (1981), Halloween 4: The Return of Michael Myers, Halloween (2007), Halloween Kills, Halloween Ends
- Status: Alive

Lindsey Wallace first appears in 1978's Halloween as she is babysat by Annie Brackett, where she sits and watches The Thing from Another World. After Annie leaves the Wallace house to go and pick up her boyfriend, Paul, she leaves Lindsey in the care of Laurie Strode, who is babysitting Tommy Doyle at his house. Before leaving to pick up her boyfriend, Annie is killed by Michael. Lindsey is then seen asleep with Tommy while Laurie goes to check on Annie, Paul, Lynda and Bob. Lindsey and Tommy later open the door for Laurie as she is chased back into the house by Michael. After locking themselves in the bathroom and Laurie being attacked twice, Laurie tells them to go to the Mackenzies' house. She appears in Halloween II in a recap of the first film's final moments and in Halloween 4: The Return of Michael Myers where she is now a teenager who is friends with Rachel Carruthers and looks after her younger foster sister Jamie Lloyd. She also appears in Rob Zombie's remake in a role much like the one she has in the original. Richards reprised the role for Halloween Kills (2021), which follows directly from the previous film, 40 years after the events of the original film as part of its own continuity. She is depicted attending the 40th anniversary of Michael's arrest and imprisonment along other survivors such as Tommy and Marion Chambers. When alerted to the escape of Myers, Marion, Lindsey, and a bar patron are tasked to task to warn others in Haddonfield to stay inside, but they are soon ambushed by Myers, who kills all of them except Lindsey, who escapes with injury.

=== Lonnie Elam ===
- Portrayed by Brent Le Page (1978), Robert Longstreet (Kills; adult) and Tristian Eggerling (Kills; child)
- Appears in: Halloween (1978), Halloween (2018) (mentioned only), Halloween Kills
- Status: Deceased
- Died in: Halloween Kills

Lonnie Elam is a bully who picks on Tommy Doyle and teases him about the bogeyman, telling him that the bogeyman is coming for him and going to get him. Lonnie also scares Tommy by telling him that "awful stuff happened in the old Myers house". Lonnie is later dared by his friend Richie to go into the Myers house, only to be scared off by Samuel Loomis, who says “Hey, Lonnie. Get yo ass away from there”. In Halloween, Lonnie's son Cameron appears, who dates Allyson, the granddaughter of Laurie Strode. Allyson's father Ray mentions Lonnie became a delinquent, having assaulted an officer and took drugs in the woods alongside Ray.

Lonnie appears as an adult in Halloween Kills. Ever since his encounter with Michael on Halloween night in 1978 (after being bullied himself by older kids), he turned to drugs and alcohol in his teens and young adult years and was a delinquent to forget his encounter with Michael. As an adult, he is now good friends with Tommy Doyle, and is seen celebrating with Tommy, Lindsey Wallace and Marion Chambers on the 40th anniversary of the original murders at a local bar. He joins Tommy's mob with his son Cameron, Laurie's granddaughter Allyson, Lindsey and many locals to find and stop Michael. Lonnie discovers the trail of murders lead to Michael's home, sending he, Cameron and Allyson to the house where Lonnie is killed.

=== Lou Martini ===
- Portrayed by Daniel Roebuck
- Appears in: Halloween (2007), Halloween II (2009)
- Status: Deceased
- Died in: Halloween II (2009)

Lou Martini is the owner of the Rabbit in Red club which Deborah Myers worked. Killed in H2 by Michael.

=== Lynda Van Der Klok ===
- Portrayed by P. J. Soles (original timeline) and Kristina Klebe (reboot timeline)
- Appears in: Halloween (1978), Halloween II (1981) (mentioned only), Halloween H20: 20 Years Later (mentioned only), Halloween: Resurrection (mentioned only), Halloween (2007), Halloween II (2009), Halloween (2018) (mentioned only), Halloween Kills, Halloween Ends
- Status: Deceased
- Died in: Halloween (1978) (original timeline) and Halloween (2007) (reboot timeline)

Lynda Van Der Klok appears as one of Laurie Strode's best friends. In the original film, Lynda is a good-natured but slightly vapid and hedonistic "valley girl" type. Along with her boyfriend Bob, she goes to the Wallace house on Halloween night to meet up with Annie and Paul as the pair had planned earlier under the pretense of smoking marijuana and having sex. However, she is not aware that Annie has been killed by Michael Myers. She and Bob then proceed to make out on the couch, unaware that Michael is watching them. Going upstairs, Lynda and Bob have sex, before Lynda sends him downstairs to get some beer. However, Michael ambushes Bob, impaling him with a knife. He then disguises himself as Bob in a ghost costume, using a sheet and Bob's glasses. An oblivious Lynda teases him, only to become irritated and calls Laurie on the phone to see if she knows where Annie or Paul are. Michael walks to Lynda while she is still on the phone, and just as Laurie answers, Michael grabs the phone cord and wraps it around Lynda's neck, strangling her. Laurie can hear Lynda squealing for help, but thinks that Annie is making a prank call. Lynda falls to the floor and dies, and her body is later discovered by Laurie, along with the bodies of Annie and Bob.

Lynda makes a cameo appearance in Halloween Kills and Halloween Ends as a photograph of her is shown along with Bob.

In the remake, Lynda, an ex-cheerleader, is a wild, foul-mouthed girl. She is best friends with Laurie and Annie. She has an outgoing, confident personality while also appearing very egotistical and opportunistic. On Halloween night, she and her boyfriend Bob sneak into the vacant Myers house for a wild night of sex, unaware that Michael is on the balcony watching them. After they have sex, Bob goes outside to his van to get more beer. He comes back inside dressed up as a ghost to surprise Lynda, but is ambushed by Michael, pushed up against the wall and stabbed. Lynda, who has not heard the attack because of the loud music she is playing, picks up her cell phone and decides to call Laurie. After Lynda finishes speaking to Laurie, Michael enters the room disguised in Bob's ghost costume and Lynda asks for her beer, but he ignores her. Lynda keeps asking him and he eventually holds his hand out to her. She is annoyed and gets up fully nude, grabbing the beer from him and berating him with profanities, adding that he (the supposed Bob) is bad in bed. Michael then takes off the ghost costume and begins to walk towards Lynda, who has her back to him and does not see him coming. He quickly grabs hold of her neck, choking her until she is dead. He then carries her away. Later that night, Laurie discovers Lynda's naked corpse set up in front of Deborah Myers' headstone and a jack-o'-lantern. She tries to help her and wake her up, before realizing she is dead.

In Rob Zombie's Halloween II, Lynda is the subject of a lewd conversation between a pair of EMTs who are transporting Michael's body in an ambulance, and a photograph of her is shown later when her father Kyle blamed Dr. Loomis for her death. He pulled a gun on Loomis with the intent of killing him. Security guards quickly apprehended and disarmed Kyle, pulling the man out of the store. It was later learned that the gun was not loaded.

== M ==
=== Marion Chambers ===
- Portrayed by Nancy Stephens
- Appears in: Halloween (1978), Halloween II (1981), Halloween H20: 20 Years Later, Halloween: Resurrection (mentioned only), Halloween Kills
- Status: Deceased
- Died in: Halloween H20: 20 Years Later (original timeline) and Halloween Kills (2018 timeline)

Marion Chambers makes her first appearance in Halloween as she drives Dr. Samuel Loomis to Smith's Grove. As they approach the main gate at the sanitarium, Dr. Loomis steps out of the car in an attempt to see why the gate is left unmanned. It is during that time that Michael Myers attacks and tries to kill Marion, but is unsuccessful as she runs out into the rain. She also appears in Halloween II, where she escorts Dr. Loomis to a Marshal's car and tells him that Laurie Strode is the younger sister of Michael and Judith Myers. They turn around and head to the hospital. As Dr. Loomis finds Laurie and shoots Michael, he tells Marion to get the police while he and the Marshal try to help Laurie. After Michael kills the Marshal and there is an explosion, Marion escorts Laurie to an ambulance. Her final appearance in the series for two decades was in Halloween H20: 20 Years Later (an alternate sequel to first two films), where it is revealed she took care of Dr. Loomis until he died. She dies in the opening of the film after having her throat slit by Michael.

Stephens returned to the role in 2021 within the second alternate timeline in the series, appearing in the sequel that ignores all films except the 1978 and 2018 versions of Halloween. She is depicted attending the 40th anniversary of Michael's arrest and imprisonment along other survivors such as Tommy Doyle and Lindsey Wallace. When alerted to the escape of Myers, Marion, Lindsey, and another bar patron are tasked to warn others in Haddonfield to stay inside, but they are soon ambushed by Myers, who kills all of them except Lindsey, who escapes with injury.

=== Mason Strode ===
- Portrayed by Pat Skipper
- Appears in: Halloween (2007)
- Status: Deceased
- Died in: Halloween (2007)

Mason Strode is the adoptive father of Laurie Strode in the remake. He is murdered by Michael Myers.

=== Michael Myers ===
- Portrayed by Nick Castle (1978, 2018; sound effects, Kills, Ends; sound effects), Tony Moran (1978; unmasked), Will Sandin (1978; child), Dick Warlock (1981), Adam Gunn (1981; young), Tom Morga (4), George P. Wilbur (4 & The Curse), Don Shanks (5), Chris Durand (H20), Brad Loree (Resurrection), Tyler Mane (2007 & 2009), Daeg Faerch (2007; young), Chase Wright Vanek (2009; young), James Jude Courtney (2018, Kills, Ends), Airon Armstrong (Kills; young), Christian Michael Pates (Kills; young)
- Appears in: Halloween (1978), Halloween II (1981), Halloween III: Season of the Witch, Halloween 4: The Return of Michael Myers, Halloween 5: The Revenge of Michael Myers, Halloween: The Curse of Michael Myers, Halloween H20: 20 Years Later, Halloween: Resurrection, Halloween (2007), Halloween II (2009), Halloween (2018), Halloween Kills, Halloween Ends
- Status: Deceased (Original, Rob Zombie, & Universal/Blumhouse timelines) / Alive (Thorn and Miramax Timelines)
- Died in: Halloween II (1981 and 2009 versions) and Halloween Ends (Universal/Blumhouse timeline)

Michael Audrey Myers (Shown in paperwork during H4 as Michael M. Myers) (born October 19, 1957) is a serial killer and the primary antagonist of the Halloween franchise. He first appears as a young boy who murders his sister, Judith Myers, and then, fifteen years later, returns home to Haddonfield to murder more teenagers. In John Carpenter's Halloween, it appears that Michael comes from a middle-class family living in the suburbs of the fictional town of Haddonfield, Illinois. There is no background to explain why Michael, at the age of 6 years, killed his older sister, Judith Myers and stopped talking (October 31, 1963). As a result of his heinous crime, Michael is institutionalized in the fictional Smith's Grove – Warren County Sanitarium. It is implied that Michael is mentally ill and suffering from schizophrenia when Dr. Loomis tells Nurse Marion Chambers that he wants Michael to be on thorazine when he is seen by the judge for a court trial. The sequel of 1981 alludes to the possibility that Michael has something more going on with him than mental illness when he writes the Celtic word Samhain in blood on the elementary school chalk board. In the 1979 novel by Curtis Richards, Michael's need to kill is caused by spirit possession and relates to the festival of Samhain. This is conveyed through a dream that Michael has, which happens to be very similar to a murder that took place during a Samhain festival in ancient Ireland (it is mentioned in the novel's prologue). Also, in the novel a young Michael hopes that by killing Judith, the voice inside his head will go away.

In the remake by Rob Zombie, Michael's urge to kill is caused in part by his dysfunctional home life. His mother, Deborah Myers, works as a stripper and is in a relationship with Ronnie White, who is a drunk and verbally abusive. Judith Myers has a larger role in the film and is an outspoken and promiscuous teenager. However, it is revealed from the beginning that Laurie Strode is his sister and that Michael is very fond of her. Michael's first murder victim is a school bully, Judith being his fourth and last before being institutionalized.

Known relatives of his based on 1978's Halloween, Halloween II (1981), Halloween 4: The Return of Michael Myers, Halloween: The Curse of Michael Myers and H20, include Mr. and Mrs. Myers, Judith Myers (his first victim), Laurie Strode, Jamie Lloyd, Stephen Lloyd, and John Tate, the latter only in H20 and Resurrection.

According to the information provided in Halloween (1978), Michael Myers, based on the date of Judith's murder (October 31, 1963) and his age at the time in which it occurred (6 years old), he would have been born sometime in the year 1957.

Following Rob Zombie's Halloween reboot, relatives include Judith Myers, Laurie Strode, and Deborah Myers.

In Halloween 4: The Return of Michael Myers, it is revealed when Dr. Hoffman is typing a report on him, that his middle name is Audrey. The same middle name is given in one of the additional scenes created for the network-TV airing of the original film, as one of the doctors at the Smith's Grove sanitarium reads to Loomis a judge's ruling that Michael be remanded to their custody.

In the original Halloween from 1978, Michael is 6 years old when he commits his first murder and has light brown hair and brown eyes. In Rob Zombie's remake, Michael is 10 years old when he commits his first murder and has blonde hair and blue eyes.

=== Mike Gonland ===
- Portrayed by Jonathan Chapin
- Appears in: Halloween 5: The Revenge of Michael Myers
- Status: Deceased
- Died in: Halloween 5: The Revenge of Michael Myers

Mike Gonland is the obnoxious boyfriend of Tina Williams and likes to act as a tough guy. He is killed by Michael Myers, when Michael impaled him with a sharp rake to the head.

Mike is the only character to share a name with the franchise's killer.

=== Mrs. Blankenship ===
- Portrayed by Janice Knickrehm
- Appears in: Halloween: The Curse of Michael Myers
- Status: Alive

On Halloween night, 1963, Laurie and Michael were left under the care of their neighbor, Mrs. Blankenship, as their parents Peter and Edith went out. However, their older sister, Judith, was left home alone with her boyfriend. While at Mrs. Blankenship's house, Michael was inflicted with the Curse of Thorn, a violent curse, that forced the bearer to kill their family members. Thirty-two years later, Mrs. Blankenship, a victim of the Curse of Thorn herself, exclaimed "The voice came to him, the night he killed his sister!"

Some say this information contradicts what Judith had told her boyfriend in the original film. In that film, the boyfriend is in the Myers residence and asks if they are alone. Judith states "Ummm...Michael's around some place." This suggests that Judith might have been babysitting Michael. However, since Michael's first point-of-view appearance had him walking toward the Myers house from directly across the street, it could also be inferred that Michael had just come from the home of Minnie Blankenship where he had been inflicted with the curse that drove him to murder Judith. Also, there was no mention of Laurie, because her being their sibling was not revealed until the sequel.

The character's name is a reference to an unseen character in Halloween III: Season of the Witch where the character Ellie remarks that her father has an appointment with a Minnie Blankenship.

=== Molly Cartwell ===
- Portrayed by Michelle Williams
- Appears in: Halloween H20: 20 Years Later
- Status: Alive

Molly Cartwell is the girlfriend of John Tate. She goes to Hillcrest Academy, the same school as John. Classmates Charlie Deveraux, Sarah Wainthrope, John and Molly are having a party in the basement of the school, when Michael Myers attacks the group of students. Laurie Strode manages to rescue Molly and John from Michael.

=== Morgan Strode ===
- Portrayed by Peter Griffith
- Appears in: Halloween (1978), Halloween II (1981) (mentioned only)
- Status: Alive

Morgan Strode is the adoptive father of Laurie Strode. He is a real estate salesman trying to sell the old Myers house. His name is not mentioned in the film but only in the credits as "Father", with the novelization of that film referring to him as Chester Strode. He is finally mentioned as Morgan Strode by head nurse Mrs. Alves in a deleted scene from Halloween II. Morgan is also the maternal grandfather of Jamie Lloyd, the great-grandfather of Steven Lloyd, the brother of John Strode, the brother-in-law of Debra Strode, the uncle of Tim and Kara, and the great-uncle of Danny Strode.

== N ==
=== Noel Kluggs ===
- Portrayed by Lew Temple
- Appears in: Halloween (2007)
- Status: Deceased
- Died in: Halloween (2007)

Noel Kluggs is a new guard at Smith's Grove. Kluggs is trained under Ismael Cruz, and is clearly annoyed with Ismael's friendship with Michael, at one point threatening to mess up Michael's room while Ismael was gone. In the unrated version, Kluggs has a slightly larger role, being involved in Michael's escape. Kluggs and his cousin Kendall rape a female patient in Michael's room. Kluggs and Kendall mock Michael, and upon putting on Michael's masks Michael lashes out at them. Michael kills Kendall, before following Kluggs out of the room and bashing his head in on the walls.

=== Nora Winston ===
- Portrayed by Tyra Banks
- Appears in: Halloween: Resurrection
- Status: Deceased
- Died in: Halloween: Resurrection

Nora Winston was the assistant to Freddie Harris. She interviewed the six cast members for Dangertainment and monitored the cameras in the garage to make sure nothing goes wrong. The cast members thought they were just exploring the home of Michael Myers but Freddie and Nora had other plans. Freddie dressed up as Michael and was planning on going to scare the kids. On his way inside, he is followed by the real Michael and believes him to be crewman Charlie. He scolds "Charlie" for wearing the same outfit as him and tells him to go to the garage with Nora. Michael obeys and goes back out to Nora, where he strangles and stabs her. Her body is later discovered hanging in the ceiling by Sara.

=== Norma Watson ===
- Portrayed by Janet Leigh
- Appears in: Halloween H20: 20 Years Later
- Status: Alive

Norma Watson was the secretary of Keri Tate at Hillcrest Academy. She was very good at her job and took care of any problem that happened at the school. On October 31, 1998, as the students were leaving for their trip, she bumped into Miss Tate which scared her. She told her that everyone was entitled to one good scare. She had noticed that Keri was feeling upset about something and had seen her like that numerous times before. She hated to see her friend like this and told her to try and concentrate on today and not the past and also told her to take care of herself. Keri thanked her for the advice and as they parted ways, Norma wished her a happy Halloween and left.

== O ==
=== Orrin Gateway ===
- Portrayed by Eric Hart
- Appears in: Halloween 4: The Return of Michael Myers
- Status: Deceased
- Died in: Halloween 4: The Return of Michael Myers

Orrin was Alan's brother, and never got over the loss of his nephew. After Michael Myers return was announced, Orrin, Alan, and their friends began hunting for Michael. Orrin believed he saw Michael, and the group shot the man dead only to discover it was Ted Hollister. Michael kills Orrin by stabbing him with a hunting knife.

=== Oscar Berlucchi ===
- Portrayed by Drew Scheid
- Appears in: Halloween (2018), Halloween Kills
- Status: Deceased
- Died in: Halloween (2018)

Oscar Berlucchi is Cameron Elam's best friend, though Cameron often bullies Oscar, and has a crush on Allyson. At the Halloween party Oscar encounters Allyson, who has discovered Cameron cheating on her. Oscar tries to walk her home through a short cut. Oscar misreads the situation and tries to kiss Allyson, upsetting her greatly. Oscar tries to apologize before encountering Michael. Mistaking Michael for the homeowner, Oscar apologizes for being on his property and bemoans his failure with Allyson. Oscar tries to leave, but is attacked by Michael. Oscar tries to escape, but his cape is caught in a fence and Michael stabs him, before impaling Oscar on the fence spike through his chin.

== P ==
=== Paul Freedman ===
- Portrayed by John Carpenter (1978; voice) and Max Van Ville (2007)
- Appears in: Halloween (1978), Halloween (2007)
- Status: Alive (original timeline) / Deceased (reboot timeline)
- Died in: Halloween (2007)

Paul Freedman is Annie Brackett's boyfriend. In the original film, he does not appear. Paul calls Annie while she is babysitting Lindsey Wallace. He tells Annie that he is grounded but his parents are not home, and insists that she come and pick him up so that they can have sex. However, Annie never picks up Paul because she gets murdered by Michael Myers. Paul is one of the few characters not to be murdered by Michael Myers in the original film.

In the remake, however, Paul has a larger role and makes an appearance, yet he is not spared this time around.

=== Peter Myers ===
- Portrayed by George O'Hanlon Jr.
- Appears in: Halloween (1978), Halloween II (1981) (mentioned only)
- Status: Deceased

Mr. Peter Myers is the father of Michael Myers, Judith Myers and Laurie Strode. His name is not mentioned in the film but it is listed in the credits. He is featured at the end of the opening scene standing outside the family home and says "Michael?!" as he pulls off the clown mask. Once he sees that it is Michael, he stares at him in apparent shock. After that scene this character is never shown again. In the sequel from 1981, it is revealed that Mr. and Mrs. Myers died two years after Judith's murder and Michael being institutionalized, leading to Laurie's adoption by the Strodes.

In the sequel, Halloween II, Michael broke into the elementary school and found a child's picture depicting a happy family. He used a butcher knife to stab the drawing of the "sister." It was discovered by the police and brought to the attention of his psychiatrist, Samuel Loomis, who briefly examined it.

Mr. Peter Myers is also the grandfather of Jamie Lloyd and John Tate, the latter one only in H20 and Resurrection. He is the great-grandfather of Stephen Lloyd.

=== Pamela Strode ===
- Portrayed by Pamela McMyler
- Appears in: Halloween II (1981)
- Status: Alive

Pamela Strode is the adoptive mother of Laurie Strode, the wife of Morgan Strode, the sister-in-law of John and Debra Strode, the aunt of Tim and Kara, and the great-aunt of Danny Strode. She is also the maternal grandmother of Jamie Lloyd and the great-grandmother of Steven Lloyd.

== R ==
=== Rachel Carruthers ===
- Portrayed by Ellie Cornell
- Appears in: Halloween 4: The Return of Michael Myers, Halloween 5: The Revenge of Michael Myers
- Status: Deceased
- Died in: Halloween 5: The Revenge of Michael Myers

Rachel Carruthers is the only child of Richard and Darlene Carruthers. It is revealed by Rachel that Laurie Strode – Jamie Lloyd's mother – babysat her when she was younger. As Rachel was around eight years old in 1978, it is possible she was a classmate of Tommy Doyle and Lindsey Wallace.

In November 1987, Jamie's mother, Laurie Strode, and father, are apparently killed in a car accident. As a result, Laurie's friends Richard and Darlene become Jamie's foster parents. Rachel is older than Jamie by nine years and becomes a surrogate sister to her.

At 4:00 AM on Monday October 31, 1988, Rachel sees Jamie is wide awake in the living room, the fourth night the girl has had difficulty sleeping. Rachel insists that Jamie return to bed. Jamie questions if Rachel loves her, and Rachel answers that she does. However, Jamie still wonders if her adoptive sister loves her as a real sibling; Rachel admits that she and Jamie are not real sisters, but that she does not love her any less because of that.

At first, she sees Jamie as a problem to her plans to be with her boyfriend Brady on Halloween. Throughout the film, Rachel takes Jamie out to pick an outfit to go trick-or-treating and flirts with Brady. She eventually protects Jamie from her uncle and assists in seemingly killing him.

The character of Rachel appears briefly in Halloween 5: The Revenge of Michael Myers before being murdered and having her role as Jamie's protector taken over by her friend Tina. Near the beginning of the film, Michael stalks Rachel around her house after she gets out of the shower, eventually killing her by stabbing her in the chest with a pair of scissors. Towards the end of the film, Rachel's body is seen in the attic of the old Myers house that Michael chases Jamie into. Ellie Cornell was keen on returning as Rachel in Halloween 5, although she became disappointed to learn that her character would be killed off early in the film. Originally, Michael was to shove the pair of scissors down her throat, but Cornell felt that this would be too gruesome, and requested that the writers change it; as a result, she is instead stabbed in the chest.

=== Dr. Ranbir Sartain ===
- Portrayed by Haluk Bilginer
- Appears in: Halloween (2018), Halloween Kills
- Status: Deceased
- Died in: Halloween (2018)

Dr. Ranbir Sartain is Michael's psychiatrist, who was previously a student of Dr. Samuel Loomis. Unlike Loomis, Sartain is obsessed with finding out Michael's motives, and is determined to make him speak. Sartain arranged for his escape to provoke a reaction out of Michael by putting him against Laurie to allow Michael to reinforce his perceived role as an 'apex predator'. Sartain persuades Sheriff Barker to allow him to help the hunt for Michael, and rides with Deputy Sheriff Frank Hawkins. While riding with Hawkins, they discover Allison and Hawkins runs over Michael. Sartain kills Hawkins so he will not kill Michael with a blade hidden in his pen, and reveals he seeks to understand how Michael feels when he kills, briefly donning Michael's mask before driving him to Laurie's house with the goal of seeing what happens when the two come face-to-face again, and taking Allyson hostage and deciding to reunite Michael and Laurie. Sartain reveals that he arranged for Michael's escape to reinforce his perceived role as an 'apex predator' who needs to finish what he started and kill Laurie to reassert himself. Allyson distracts Sartain by claiming that Michael spoke to her earlier. Michael soon regains consciousness and kills Sartain, while Allyson flees into the woods.

=== Ray Nelson ===
- Portrayed by Toby Huss
- Appears in: Halloween (2018), Halloween Kills (mentioned only), Halloween Ends (mentioned only)
- Status: Deceased
- Died in: Halloween (2018)

Ray Nelson is the husband of Karen Nelson, father of Allyson Nelson and the son-in law of Laurie Strode. He was strangled to death and had his neck broken by Michael Myers outside of Laurie's home.

=== Richard Carruthers ===
- Portrayed by Jeff Olson
- Appears in: Halloween 4: The Return of Michael Myers, Halloween 5: The Revenge of Michael Myers (mentioned only)
- Status: Alive

Richard Carruthers is the foster father of Jamie Lloyd and biological father of Rachel Carruthers.

=== Richie ===
- Portrayed by Mickey Yablans
- Appears in: Halloween (1978), Halloween Kills (mentioned only)
- Status: Alive

Richie is friends with Lonnie Elam and also bullies Tommy Doyle. Richie briefly encounters Michael Myers, who grabs him and lets him go.

=== Robert Tramer ===
- Portrayed by Tony DeMil
- Appears in: Halloween Ends
- Status: Alive

Robert Tramer is the abusive father of Terry Tramer and the son of Ben Tramer. Robert attended Haddonfield High School much like his father before him and his son after him and was the star linebacker for the Haddonfield High Football team. He is visibly upset when his son decides to choose Marching Band of all the ECA's and starts to physically and verbally abuse him over it. On October 2022, Robert's car tyres are slashed which makes him blame Terry and bring him to Ronald Prevo's junkyard where he shows him the car whilst also abusing his son verbally at the same time to show how angry he is with his car damaged.

=== Ronnie White ===
- Portrayed by William Forsythe
- Appears in: Halloween (2007), Halloween II (2009)
- Status: Deceased
- Died in: Halloween (2007)

Ronnie White is the abusive boyfriend of Deborah Myers and is particularly abusive towards her son, Michael Myers. Ronnie is depicted as being a lazy, abusive drunk who spends most of his time arguing with the family. He is killed at the beginning of the film by a young Michael, who ties him up without waking him and slits his throat using a large kitchen knife.

== S ==
=== Samantha Thomas ===
- Portrayed by Tamara Glynn
- Appears in: Halloween 5: The Revenge of Michael Myers
- Status: Deceased
- Died in: Halloween 5: The Revenge of Michael Myers

Samantha Thomas was best friends with Rachel Carruthers and Tina Williams. She was murdered on Halloween 1989 by Michael Myers after going to a Halloween party at a local farm, when he sliced her across the chest with a scythe.

=== Dr. Samuel Loomis ===
- Portrayed by Donald Pleasence (1978 – The Curse), Tom Kane (H20; voice) Malcolm McDowell (2007 & 2009), Colin Mahan (2018; voice, Kills; voice), Tom Jones Jr. (Kills; body double)
- Appears in: Halloween (1978), Halloween II (1981), Halloween 4: The Return of Michael Myers, Halloween 5: The Return of Michael Myers, Halloween: The Curse of Michael Myers, Halloween H20: 20 Years Later, Halloween (2007), Halloween II (2009), Halloween (2018), Halloween Kills
- Status: Alive (Thorn timeline) / Deceased (Original and Rob Zombie timelines)
- Died in: Halloween II (1981 & 2009)

Dr. Samuel Loomis is a psychiatrist, and his patient is Michael Myers. He goes to Haddonfield, Illinois after Michael escapes from Smith's Grove Sanitarium. Once in Haddonfield, he goes to the local cemetery and discovers that Judith Myers' tombstone is missing, thus confirming his suspicion that Michael returned home. He later informs Sheriff Leigh Brackett about the danger that Michael poses for the residents of Haddonfield. Throughout the film, he searches for Michael and successfully finds him at the Doyle residence. There, Dr. Loomis shoots Michael, who is strangling Laurie Strode, which causes Michael to fall out a second floor window and onto the front lawn. When Loomis peers out of the window, he discovers that Michael is gone. This character returns in the original Halloween II (1981, in which he died), and in the Thorn Timeline (Halloween 4: The Return of Michael Myers, Halloween 5: The Revenge of Michael Myers, and Halloween: The Curse of Michael Myers—in the latter film, Loomis is implied to have died in the theatrical version while he lives in the longer “Producer’s Cut”). In Rob Zombie's Halloween from 2007, a new incarnation of the character would be introduced. This character appeared again in the 2009 version of Halloween II.

=== Sara Moyer ===
- Portrayed by Bianca Kajlich
- Appears in: Halloween: Resurrection
- Status: Alive

Sara Moyer is a main protagonist in Resurrection. Sara and her friends sign up for a game show in which they must stay in the Myers House for a whole night. As the game show progresses, Michael returns home and kills many of Sara's friends. However, fortunately for Sara, her pen pal Myles Barton has contact with her inside the house through her PDA, guiding her through the house to safety. As the film progresses, Sara attempts to fight back using a chainsaw, but is unsuccessful, accidentally starting a fire inside the house. As she tries to escape, her leg is caught under a table with heavy wires on top of it, but she is eventually saved by Freddie Harris. They escape from the house, leaving Michael inside. By the end of the film, Sara and Freddie are still alive, being two of the few in the series to survive an attack by Michael and the sole survivors in Halloween: Resurrection.

=== Spitz ===
- Portrayed by Matthew Walker
- Appears in: Halloween 5: The Revenge of Michael Myers
- Status: Deceased
- Died in: Halloween 5: The Revenge of Michael Myers

Spitz is the friendly boyfriend of Samantha Thomas. On Halloween 1989, he attends a party at a local farm with his girlfriend and their friend Tina. He is later murdered by Michael Myers, who impales him with a pitchfork while he is having sex with his girlfriend inside a barn.

=== Stephen Lloyd ===
- Portrayed by Emily Haterson
- Appears in: Halloween: The Curse of Michael Myers
- Status: Alive

The son (and also cousin in Producer's Cut) of Jamie Lloyd. He is shown as a baby in Halloween: The Curse of Michael Myers and is protected by Tommy Doyle after his mother (also cousin in Producer's Cut) is murdered. He is the result of an experiment by Dr. Terence Wynn who has been using Michael and female patients of the institution to genetically create evil in its purest form.

His maternal relatives include Laurie Strode (grandmother/aunt in Producer's Cut), Michael Myers (great-uncle/father in Producer's Cut), Judith Myers (great-aunt/aunt in Producer's Cut), as well as both Mr. and Mrs. Myers (great-grandparents).

In the Producer's Cut of Halloween: The Curse of Michael Myers it is shown that Wynn had impregnated Jamie with Michael's DNA, and that Stephen is both Michael's biological son and great-nephew.

=== Steve Haley ===
- Portrayed by Adam Weisman
- Appears in Halloween (2007), Halloween II (2009)
- Status: Deceased
- Died in: Halloween (2007)

Steve Haley was the boyfriend of Judith Myers in the 2007 reboot. He was murdered by Michael Myers after he had sex with Judith. His death was caused by a severe beating to the head with a baseball bat. He is notable for wearing the white mask which is later worn by Michael when he murders Judith and when he returns to Haddonfield, Illinois years later.

== T ==
=== Teddy ===
- Portrayed by Wendy Wessberg
- Appears in: Halloween III: Season of the Witch
- Status: Deceased
- Died in: Halloween III: Season of the Witch

Teddy was the coroner who worked in the same hospital as Dr. Daniel Challis, and has history with him. On October 23, a man named Harry Grimbridge is murdered after being brought in to the hospital clutching a Halloween mask and his killer blows himself up in a car. Four days later on the 27th, Dr. Challis decides to set out with Harry's daughter Ellie to investigate the murder. Before he leaves, Challis talks to Teddy about the killer who was dressed like a businessman and was able to rip apart Harry's skull with inhuman strength despite not appearing to be on drugs as the police think otherwise. Then Challis asks Teddy to look into the killer's autopsy for clues and let him know if she finds anything unusual.

As Dan and Ellie stay at a motel in the town of Santa Mira on October 29, Dr. Challis calls Teddy and she tells him the autopsy results will be delayed as it appears they have been examining charred car parts by mistake due to mixed-up envelopes, and the collected ashes analyzed were metal and plastic shavings. The following morning, Dan checks in with Teddy again. She tells him the autopsy has gotten strange because no human remains were found and nothing in the ashes indicates there was ever a body in the car when it exploded, believing someone must have tampered with the evidence. Dan asks her to stop with the autopsy and instead look into Conal Cochran, the owner of the Halloween novelty and mask making company Silver Shamrock, where the jack-o'-lantern mask Harry Grimbridge was holding came from. On Halloween night, Teddy tries to call Dan back at the motel but the number is disconnected. Then she calls a colleague and asks him to come in the next morning to confirm her findings. Unbeknownst to Teddy, a man in a suit sneaks into her office and removes an electric drill from a drawer. As she looks at one of the parts of the killer's charred car, Teddy makes the startling realization that some of the parts she has been looking at were not from the car but the killer. As soon as Teddy tries to call the sheriff, she is stopped and attacked by a businessman similar to the one who killed Harry. The man forces Teddy onto the floor and pins her down as she struggles. Then the businessman turns on the drill and forces it into Teddy's ear, killing her.

According to Tommy Lee Wallace on the film's Blu-ray audio commentary, Teddy was added to the film during re-shoots. Originally, there would have been scenes of Dr. Challis repeatedly talking to an unknown and unseen character on the phone about the coroner's report on Harry Grimbridge's killer. Wallace decided to flesh out the story some more and actually show the character Dan is talking to with the addition of Teddy. This also made it necessary to add an early scene showing Dan and Teddy talking to each other and establishing past history between them through their dialogue.

According to production materials in AMPAS library files, Teddy's full name is "Teddy Bryant".

=== Ted Hollister ===
- Appears in: Halloween 4: The Return of Michael Myers (mentioned only)
- Status: Deceased
- Died in: Halloween 4: The Return of Michael Myers

Ted Hollister is an unseen character and was one of Haddonfield's residents. Ted ignored the warning to stay indoors and was shot dead by Alan Gateway and his friends who mistook him for Michael Myers.

=== Dr. Terence Wynn ===
- Portrayed by Robert Phalen (1978), Don Shanks (5), Mitch Ryan (The Curse), and Sybil Danning (2007)
- Appears in: Halloween (1978), Halloween 5: The Revenge of Michael Myers, Halloween: The Curse of Michael Myers, Halloween (2007)
- Status: Deceased (both versions of the sixth film and 2007 reboot timeline)
- Died in: Halloween: The Curse of Michael Myers (both versions) and Halloween (2007)

Despite being the administrator of Smith's Grove – Warren County Sanitarium, Dr. Wynn only makes a short appearance in the first Halloween film. In it, he is seen walking with Dr. Loomis towards his car. During the scene, Dr. Loomis expresses his anger that Michael Myers was able to escape from the facility the previous night. Dr. Wynn says that Michael could not have gotten far because he could not drive. Dr. Loomis says ironically "He was doing very well last night! Maybe, someone around here gave him lessons." This exchange gains additional meaning after the revelation in the sixth film that Dr. Wynn had been watching over Michael since his incarceration, and it is probably he who taught Michael how to drive.

Although it was unknown at the time, Dr. Wynn made his next appearance in Halloween 5: The Revenge of Michael Myers. The film features a mysterious "Man in Black" arriving in Haddonfield, who has a tattoo identical to one which Michael has. In the climax of the film, the Man in Black, in his role as Michael's guardian, kills everyone at the Haddonfield police station with a machine gun and afterwards rescues Michael from the police station and eventually abducts Jamie who was also there. This film did not reveal the Man in Black's identity to the audience, and at the time the film went into production, the writers themselves had not decided who the Man in Black actually was.

In the sixth film, it is revealed that the Man in Black is Dr. Wynn, and that he is the head of a cult which supposedly cursed Michael into killing his whole family, therefore explaining the reason for his constant pursuit of his sister and later his niece. In the end, Wynn turns out to have been secretly using Michael's DNA to create the curse of Thorn in its purest form that he believed manifested in his genes. After failing in DNA and in-vitro fertilization experiments, tested on the female patients of Smith's Grove Sanitarium (and leading to stillborn fetuses), the experiment became a success when tested on now 15-year-old Jamie Lloyd, who gives birth to a live baby. In the Theatrical Cut, Michael kills him in an operating room along with 9 other doctors from Smiths Grove, though Wynn's death is not seen onscreen.

In the Producer's Cut of the sixth film however, Dr. Wynn and his staff follow their cult aspect more closely and planned on making Jamie's baby Michael's final sacrifice during a ritual. Tommy Doyle however interrupts the ritual and soon paralyzes Michael with rune stones, releasing him of his curse. Later, Dr. Loomis approaches the person he thinks is Michael Myers relieved that it was now all over but to Loomis' surprise, Michael has switched clothes with Wynn and left him lying there while he makes his escape into the night. Loomis takes the mask off Wynn, and a dying Wynn grabs Loomis' arm, telling him, "It's your game now, Dr. Loomis." Loomis then looks at his wrist and sees that the Thorn tattoo is now on his arm, symbolizing his new role as the leader of the Thorn Cult, and that the Thorn Curse has now passed on to him. Dr. Wynn is not featured in the subsequent films, which ignore the previous three films, thereby eliminating the Thorn Timeline.

In the first reboot of the franchise, Wynn also appears briefly, but is a female nurse, not a male doctor. In the film, she is asked to watch a young Michael Myers while Dr. Loomis walks Mrs. Myers to her car. Nurse Wynn teases Michael and is killed when he pulls a fork from his food tray and stabs her in the neck.

=== Terrence Gummell ===
- Portrayed by John Zenda
- Appears in: Halloween II (1981)
- Status: Deceased
- Died in: Halloween II (1981)

Terrence Gummell was a federal marshal sent to return Samuel Loomis to Smith's Grove Sanitarium after word of the murders became public. Loomis nearly shot him and told him to turn his car around and to head to Haddonfield Memorial Hospital upon finding out that Laurie Strode was Michael's sister. Later, he was leaning over Michael's body, whom Loomis had shot, when Michael jumped up and slit the lawman's throat with a scalpel.

=== Terry Tramer ===
- Portrayed by Michael Barbieri
- Appears in: Halloween Ends
- Status: Deceased
- Died in: Halloween Ends

Terry Tramer is the son of Robert Tramer and the grandson of Ben Tramer who attends Haddonfield High School in 2022 with his friends Billy and Stacy and girlfriend Margo and is a member of the marching band alongside them. Terry and his friends plan to get beer and force Corey Cunningham to assist them with it. When he refuses, Terry insults him over the fact that he was suspected of killing Jeremy Allen on Halloween Night 3 years ago and compares him to Michael Myers which causes Corey to start a rivalry with him and slash his father's car's tyres when Terry is not looking. One night, Terry, Billy, Margo and Stacy confront Corey over the tyres at a bridge where they then start bullying and taunting him until the latter insults Terry over the fact that his father abuses him, causing him to throw Corey down the bridge in a fit of rage and then leave with his friends as to not get implicated in a possible murder.

On Halloween Night, Terry and his friends find out that Corey is alive and go to Corey's stepfather Ronald Prevo's junkyard in the hopes of killing him. It is here where the now psychotic Corey murders all of Terry's friends and where Terry accidentally shoots Ronald to death, causing Corey to then murder him in a fit of rage.

=== Tim Strode ===
- Portrayed by Keith Bogart
- Appears in: Halloween: The Curse of Michael Myers
- Status: Deceased
- Died in: Halloween: The Curse of Michael Myers

Tim Strode is Kara's brother, Danny's uncle, and John and Debra's son. Tim and his girlfriend Beth planned a Halloween festival. While taking a shower, Michael slits Tim's throat.

=== Tina Williams ===
- Portrayed by Wendy Kaplan
- Appears in: Halloween 5: The Revenge of Michael Myers
- Status: Deceased
- Died in: Halloween 5: The Revenge of Michael Myers

Tina Williams is the best friend of Rachel Carruthers and Samantha Thomas in Halloween 5. Her boyfriend is Mike Gonland. When Jamie Lloyd tells her about the vision she had of Michael Myers, Tina dismisses it and goes to a Halloween party at a farm with Samantha and her boyfriend Spitz. While at the party she is bothered about Mike not arriving and unaware that he has been murdered by Michael. She then goes to the barn, while Jamie and her young friend Billy Hill arrive at the farm, worried about Tina. After finding Samantha and Spitz murdered in the barn and seeing Michael, Tina runs outside to seek help, only to find the police officers sent to protect her already dead. Michael begins to chase Jamie, Billy and Tina in the car he stole from Mike, until they go into the woods and he crashes. However, he emerges from the wreckage and continues to pursue them. During the chase, Michael fatally stabs Tina who sacrificed herself in order for Jamie and Billy to run away, also verbally telling them to run even as she was dying.

=== Tommy Doyle ===
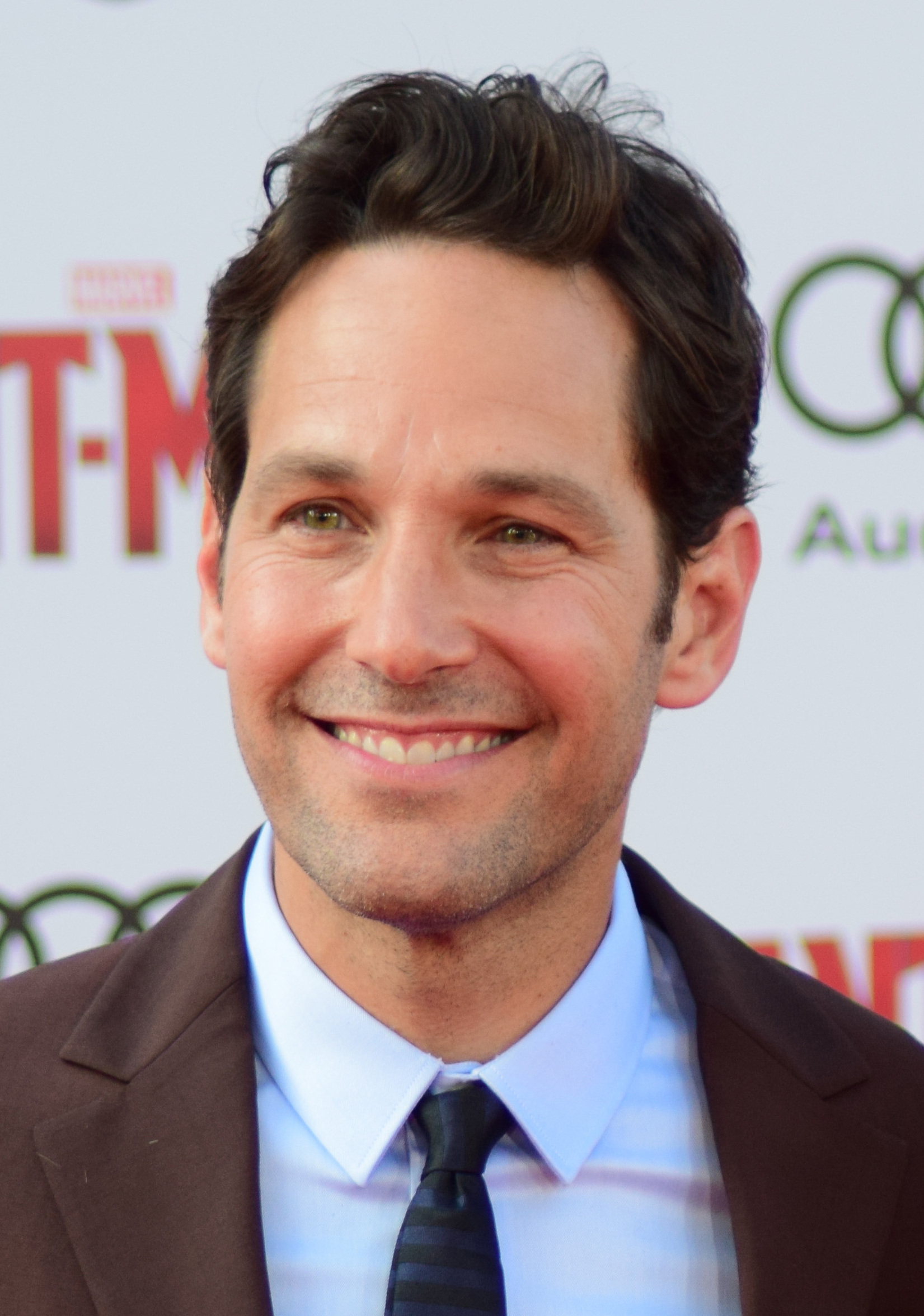
The adult Tommy Doyle was portrayed by Paul Rudd in Halloween: The Curse of Michael Myers

- Portrayed by Brian Andrews (1978), Danny Ray (The Return), Paul Rudd (The Curse), Skyler Gisondo (2007), and Anthony Michael Hall (Kills)
- Appears in: Halloween (1978), Halloween II (1981), Halloween: The Curse of Michael Myers, Halloween H20: 20 Years Later (mentioned only), Halloween (2007), Halloween Kills
- Status: Alive (excluding 2018 timeline) / Deceased (2018 timeline)
- Died in: Halloween Kills

Tommy Doyle in the original Halloween is an eight-year-old boy being babysat by Laurie Strode alongside Lindsey Wallace. Tommy is afraid of the bogeyman and constantly asks questions about him to Laurie, who claims he does not exist. When he sees Michael Myers across the street at the Wallace house, Tommy believes it is the bogeyman, but Laurie dismisses his suspicions. When Laurie eventually goes over to the Wallace house to see what her friends Annie and Lynda are doing, she is attacked by Michael. She runs back to the Doyle house, screaming at Tommy to wake up and unlock the door, and he does so. Laurie eventually sends him and Lindsey to find help, and their screams alert Dr. Loomis to Michael's location. Halloween II briefly features Tommy in footage from the first film.

In Halloween 4: The Return of Michael Myers, a teenage Tommy is seen hanging out at Vincent's Drug Store with his new friends Brady and Wade. In Halloween: The Curse of Michael Myers, a 25-year-old Tommy is a reclusive individual who, following the events of Halloween 4 and 5, becomes obsessed with Michael. Tommy theorizes that Michael's obsession with killing his family members stems from the Curse of Thorn, and vows to protect Jamie Lloyd's baby, the latest in the Myers bloodline. His search leads him to the Smith's Grove Sanitarium, where he and Dr. Loomis uncover the supposed "Cult of Thorn". Tommy battles Michael, beating him with a pipe, and escapes with baby Stephen along with Kara and Danny Strode.

Tommy (last name spelled "Doyal" per the credits) appears in the 2007 reboot, where the character has a similar role to the one he has in the original.

Farrands compares Tommy's arc in that film to Laurie Strode's in Halloween H20: that of a traumatized victim who must stop running and face their worst fear. He claims that this was supposed to be more obvious, with flashbacks to the original film, but the development of the film resulted in many of those scenes being lost. Farrands says that he brought Tommy back as a way of bridging the gap between the sequels and the first film. His intent was for Tommy to be the successor to Dr. Loomis, to act as a "voice of sanity...a kind of modern Van Helsing, the fearless Michael hunter!", a role he believed was missing from H20 and Resurrection.

Tommy returns in Halloween Kills. Now in his late 40s, he is celebrating the anniversary of the events of the first movie with Lindsey, Marion and Lonnie when word gets out that Michael has escaped. Traumatized by what happened to him as a kid, his goal is to protect Laurie and start a mob, hunt and kill Michael for all the pain he’s caused Haddonfield. After several attempts to subdue him throughout the night, Tommy and his mob finally corner Michael and seemingly kill him. Moments later, Michael is revived, killing everyone in the mob including Tommy.

== U ==
=== Unger ===
- Portrayed by Walt Logan Field
- Appears in: Halloween 4: The Return of Michael Myers
- Status: Deceased
- Died in Halloween 4: The Return of Michael Myers

Unger was one of Big Al's friends. He joined the others in hunting Michael Myers, and was killed when Michael threw him off a moving truck.

== V ==
=== Virginia Alves ===
- Portrayed by Gloria Gifford
- Appears in: Halloween II (1981)
- Status: Deceased
- Died in: Halloween II (1981)

Mrs. Virginia Alves is the head nurse at Haddonfield Memorial Hospital. She dies when Michael Myers hooks her up to an I.V, thus slowly draining her blood.

=== Vicky ===
- Portrayed by Virginia Gardner
- Appears in: Halloween (2018)
- Status: Deceased
- Died in: Halloween (2018)

Vicky is the best friend of Allyson, the granddaughter of Laurie Strode. She is shown walking with her boyfriend, Dave and Allyson at first. She calls Allyson to see if she wants to come over to the house she is babysitting at and smoke weed after Julian goes to bed. Before Allyson can come over, Vicky is attacked by Michael Myers. Michael, who was hiding in Julian's closet, ambushes Vicky. As Vicky tries to escape with Julian, her socks instantly slip out, causing Michael to grab her. When Julian pokes upstairs, Vicky urges for him to run, ensuring Julian’s safety, before Michael stabs her twice in the back, killing her. In the following film, Julian recounts Vicky sacrificing herself to protect him.

== W ==
=== Will Brennan ===
- Portrayed by Adam Arkin
- Appears in: Halloween H20: 20 Years Later, Halloween: Resurrection
- Status: Deceased
- Died in: Halloween H20: 20 Years Later

Will Brennan is Hillcrest Academy High School's guidance counselor and the boyfriend of headmistress Keri Tate – also known as Laurie Strode. Laurie reveals her true identity to Will, however, when Michael comes to Hillcrest in search of his sister, Will is murdered in front of Laurie while attempting to protect her.
