= Brian Andrews (actor) =

American actor

- Occupation: Actor
- Years active: 1978-present

Brian Andrews is an American actor who has appeared in movies and on television. He is best known for his role as Tommy Doyle in the John Carpenter horror movie Halloween. He has also appeared in the films The Great Santini, Three O'Clock High and The Long Days of Summer.

His first television role was in the soap opera Days of Our Lives in 1970, as Michael William Horton.

Andrews has appeared on TV movies and made guest appearances on TV shows like Kung Fu, Baretta, Quincy, The Bronx Zoo.

Andrews lives in Phoenix, Arizona.
