= Robert Phalen =

American actor (1937–1995)

Robert Anthony Phalen (May 10, 1937 – December 6, 1995) was an American actor who starred in films and on television.

== Life and career ==
He was born on May 10, 1937 in San Francisco, California, where he attended George Washington High School, was active in the school's drama club, and served as student body president.

His early stage work includes his membership of San Francisco's Actor's Workshop, where he played a variety of roles in the early 1960s, including Mick in Harold Pinter's The Caretaker. He was in the 1978 hit horror movie Halloween as Dr. Terence Wynn. He also appeared in two other John Carpenter movies, Someone's Watching Me! (1978) and Starman (1984). His other film credits include Three Days of the Condor (1975), Just You and Me, Kid (1979), Zoot Suit (1981), The Gladiator (1986) and Impulse (1990).

Phalen made guest appearances on many television shows, including M*A*S*H, Baretta, Centennial, Hill Street Blues, The Facts of Life, and Babylon 5 (as the father of main character Susan Ivanova).

He died from complications of AIDS in Los Angeles, California on December 6, 1995, at the age of 58.

== Filmography ==
Year	Title	Role	Notes
1975	Three Days of the Condor	Newberry	
1977	The Trial of Lee Harvey Oswald		TV film
1978	Halloween	Dr. Terence Wynn	
1978	Someone's Watching Me!	Wayne	
1979	Just You and Me, Kid	Foster Father	
1981	Zoot Suit	District Attorney	
1983	The Dukes of Hazzard	Mr. Lipton	
1984	Starman	Major Bell	
1986	The Gladiator	Dr. Maxwell	
1990	Impulse	Coroner	
