= Rachel Carruthers =

Fictional character from Halloween film series

- Halloween character
- Ellie Cornell as Rachel Carruthers in Halloween 4: The Return of Michael Myers.
- First appearance: Halloween 4: The Return of Michael Myers (1988)
- Last appearance: Halloween 5: The Revenge of Michael Myers (1989)
- Created by: Alan B. McElroy
- Portrayed by: Ellie Cornell

In-universe information
- Full name: Rachel Carruthers
- Occupation: Babysitter
- Family: Richard Carruthers (father); Darlene Carruthers (mother); Jamie Lloyd (foster sister)
- Status: Deceased
- Date of birth: 1971
- Date of death: October 31st, 1989

Rachel Carruthers is a fictional character in the Halloween series of slasher films, and is the final girl of the film Halloween 4: The Return of Michael Myers (1988). Rachel is the foster sister of Jamie Lloyd, who is the niece of serial killer Michael Myers. In Halloween 5: The Revenge of Michael Myers (1989), she becomes Myers' 35th victim. Rachel was portrayed by actress Ellie Cornell.

== Appearances ==
=== Halloween 4: The Return of Michael Myers ===
Rachel Carruthers is the only child of Richard and Darlene Carruthers. In November 1987, Jamie's biological parents Laurie Strode and Jimmy Lloyd were (apparently) killed in an automobile accident. According to Rachel, Laurie babysat her when she was younger. Laurie's friends Richard and Darlene then became Jamie's foster parents. Rachel is older than Jamie by nine years and became a surrogate sister to her.

On October 31, 1988, Rachel sees that Jamie is again wide awake in the living room, being the fourth night in a row she has had difficulty sleeping. Rachel insists that Jamie return to bed. Jamie questions if Rachel loves her. Rachel answers that she does indeed love her. But Jamie wonders if her adoptive sister loves her as a real sibling. Rachel admits that she and Jamie are not real sisters, but that she does not love her any less because of that.

At first, she sees Jamie as a problem to her plans with her boyfriend Brady. Throughout the film, Rachel takes Jamie out to pick an outfit to go trick-or-treating in (which happens to be a clown costume that looks very much like the one her uncle wore), flirts with Brady, and eventually protects Jamie from her uncle and assists in killing him.

=== Halloween 5: The Revenge of Michael Myers ===
The character of Rachel only makes a quick appearance in Halloween 5: The Revenge of Michael Myers before being killed off and having her role as Jamie's protector taken over by her friend Tina. At the beginning of the film, Michael stalks Rachel around her house after she gets out of the shower and eventually kills her by stabbing her in the chest with a pair of scissors. Near the end of the film, Rachel's body makes one final appearance in the attic that Michael chases Jamie into.

== Characterization ==
Patrick Bromley calls Rachel "a fully realized teenage girl" torn between family obligations and wanting to go out with friends, crediting Cornell with "imbuing Rachel with resourcefulness and intelligence without making her tough as nails."

A.A. Dowd of The A.V. Club writes that Jamie and Rachel split the heroine role previously held by Laurie Strode as the pair of sisters "are stalked by Myers, who in turn is hunted by both a scarred, limping Loomis and a mob of trigger-happy hillbillies." Little said that Jamie and Rachel had the "universal fear" of being "in a group of people and then suddenly, you are completely alone, isolated and scared." He recounted wanting to explore this feeling with the scene in Halloween 4 in which Jamie and Rachel are separated while trick-or-treating and this fear was "not just unique to Jamie because she’s a small child." "At the inception of the film, the innocence and vulnerability of Jamie contrasted with the stern and nonchalant demeanor of Rachel," Rodoflo Salas wrote. Salas explained that the relationship progresses after Rachel recognizes "her selfishness was steamrolling over Jamie" and tries to bring her joy during Halloween ahead of Michael encountering the pair: "Once Michael Myers arrived, Rachel took charge and fought back against Jamie's psychotic uncle on rooftops, schoolyards, and streets. She pulled out all the stops to save her sister." Chris Sasaguay wrote that Jamie demonstrated forced maturity when she commanded herself to stop crying before Rachel could see her and insisted that the sibling bond between Jamie and Rachel "makes the suspense scenes reach such a high level of anxiety."

== Development ==
“The interesting thing with Ellie Cornell was that we were down to the last two or three girls who we thought could play that part, and there was some disagreement between myself and Moustapha and [Galaxy International Releasing] and Ellie. We had different points of view about which way we should go.”

“Ellie was very real and I felt that she came from Haddonfield and I felt like she represented a kind of wholesome quality that was gonna get our empathy and our sympathy as the movie went along and a lot of 80's sort of scream movies would have very very glamorous leads and I never felt that it was quite real to the town that they were from, and when we projected the film in the theater then Moustapha sort of understood my point of view.”

— Dwight H. Little on the casting of Ellie Cornell (2014)

Ellie Cornell auditioned for the role of Alice Johnson in A Nightmare on Elm Street 4: The Dream Master and Rachel Carruthers in Los Angeles at around the same time. Moustapha Akkad was unsure about the casting of Ellie Cornell; it was director Dwight H. Little who pushed for her to be chosen among the final candidates. Little and McElroy did not return for the sequel. Little later said the duo would have furthered developed the relationship between Jamie and Rachel: "What we would have done was to work on the relationship between the sisters – between Danielle and Ellie – as I do think that was the core of the movie then. We clearly would’ve gone in a very different way, but it really wasn’t up to me to decide at that point because I didn’t have time to participate."

Akkad later expressed regret about killing Rachel off early in Halloween 5, admitting that if he knew how popular her character would become, he might have chosen differently. Akkad also stated that "I think one of the things maybe we felt sorry is we killed Ellie in the first few minutes of the film - I think we should have kept Ellie going on and on because she was very popular".

Cornell did not initially plan on returning as Rachel in Halloween 5 but agreed to with the understanding that her character would be killed off early in the film. She requested that the writers change her form of death. Originally, Michael was to stab Rachel in the throat with scissors. But Cornell felt that ending her character in this way would have been too gruesome. In the finished film, she is instead stabbed in her left breast just below her shoulder.

== Reception ==
Rachel is often cited as one the most popular recurring protagonist of the series behind Laurie Strode. Medium.com lists Rachel as the 27th best out of 100 final girls. Rachel's early demise in Halloween 5: The Revenge of Michael Myers brought negative backlash from fans of the series, who had hoped to see Rachel survive longer. The character's replacement in the story with the character of Tina further frustrated fans, as audiences found Tina to be grating and irritating, often citing her as one of the most annoying characters in horror films. On the documentary Halloween: 25 Years of Terror, film critic John Fallon states that "Tina, the character of Tina, in all my experience with horror films, the character of Tina has been the only one where I wanted to choke her, choke her a lot."

Rachel's development throughout Halloween 4 was seen as a strong point for acclaim throughout the movie, with audiences reacting positively to Rachel maturing into a protective sister for Jamie. Ellie Cornell's acting in the film was also seen as a high point, especially considering the performance was Cornell's acting debut. Professional critic John Kenneth Muir states that "Ellie Cornell is particularly strong as Rachel, a delightful girl-next-door with just the right measures of sassness and sweetness" and that she is Laurie Strodes equal in resourcefulness and resilience. Muir also expresses annoyance and disappointment that the sequel did nothing to honor Rachel's memory after she had been killed off, arguing that "Halloween V never recovers its footing after the death of Rachel Carruthers, a character audiences care deeply about. And it's worse that others (including Jamie) don't seem traumatized by it. The remainder of the film includes a mysterious stranger and comedic cops, and doesn't really honor Rachel in any significant way, or even treat her character with respect.". Rodolfo Salas on Screen Rant adds in that "Before Rachel's body went cold, this sequel added some shame to her shallow grave. Rachel is replaced by Tina Williams, a naive, boyfriend-obsessed youngster." Modern film critic Chris Stuckmann was mixed on the character in his retrospective review of the film stating "What's unfortunate about the Rachel character in this film is that she's not really a character. She's just, kind of jealous and she's trying to maybe get with this guy and then it doesn't really work out. And she argues with him a little bit and she doesn't really want to babysit but 'fine I'll babysit'. The argument could definitely be made that there's really not that much to the characters in the original Halloween either. Which I'm not denying but if your characters are going to be weak, and your story is very simple, then the helming of it has to be above average. You want your 'big three' to be strong: writing, directing, and acting. And if one of them is weaker, you should usually try to make the other better to compensate." James A. Janisse of Dead Meat stated in his Kill Count for Halloween 5 on the character's treatment "I hate that the previous film's savvy final girl became a bubbly airhead in this one", and compared the character's death early in the film to the deaths of the surviving characters from A Nightmare on Elm Street 3: Dream Warriors at the beginning of the following movie.
