= Annie Brackett =

- Halloween character
- Nancy Kyes as Annie in Halloween (1978)
- First appearance: Halloween
- Created by: John Carpenter; Debra Hill
- Portrayed by: Original series: (1978, 1981); Nancy Kyes; Reboot series: (2007, 2009); Danielle Harris
- Voiced by: Kaitlyn Robrock (Halloween: The Game)

In-universe information
- Full name: Anne Marie Brackett
- Occupation: Student; Babysitter
- Family: Leigh Brackett (father); Joanne Brackett (mother)
- Significant others: Paul Freedman (boyfriend)
- Status: Deceased

Annie Brackett is a fictional character in the Halloween franchise. The character was created by screenwriters John Carpenter and Debra Hill. Annie first appears in Halloween (1978) as a high school student babysitting Lindsey Wallace (Kyle Richards) who unwittingly encounters an escaped mental patient—Michael Myers. In this film, she is portrayed by Nancy Kyes, who briefly reprises the role in the sequel Halloween II (1981). Kyes' image is used to reference the character throughout the franchise except for in the remake (2007) and its sequel (2009), in which she is portrayed by Danielle Harris. Harris had previously appeared in Halloween 4 (1988) and 5 (1989) as Laurie's daughter, Jamie Lloyd.

While killed off in the original film, Annie survives her initial encounter with Michael in the remake and is alive for a time in the sequel to the remake, Halloween II (2009) in which Annie's relationship with Laurie and their shared trauma is explored.

== Appearances ==
=== Films ===
In the original Halloween (1978), Annie is established with Lynda Van der Klok as one of Laurie Strode's best friends, and the daughter of Haddonfield's sheriff, Leigh Brackett. She is portrayed as having a very rebellious and sardonic personality. Annie is walking home from school with her friends, talking about how her plans were ruined because of her boyfriend Paul being grounded for the night. A car speeds down the road past them. Annie yells at the driver; unbeknownst to her, he is Michael Myers (Nick Castle), an escaped mental patient who murdered his sister, Judith Myers (Sandy Johnson), 15 years ago and has begun stalking Laurie. The girls then continue on with their plans for the night as Lynda is planning to also come over to the Wallace's with her boyfriend Bob Simms. Lynda leaves the girls once she reaches her house and Laurie notices Michael watching her, and tells Annie of this and the latter goes to investigate, but discovers nothing. She jokes to Laurie that she had managed to "scare another one away" and dismisses her concerns. Later that Halloween night, Annie is babysitting Lindsey Wallace while Laurie babysits Tommy Doyle, just across the street, unaware that Michael has followed them. The two friends gossip over the telephone throughout the evening. When Annie's boyfriend, Paul, calls her to come and pick him up, she takes Lindsey over to the Doyle house to spend the night with Laurie and Tommy. Annie is just about to leave in her car when Michael, who was hiding in the back seat, strangles her before slitting her throat, killing her. Her corpse is later found by Laurie sprawled out on a bed with the tombstone of Judith Myers placed behind her body. In Halloween II (1981), Annie's corpse appears briefly. A grieving Sheriff Leigh Brackett, Annie's father, ends his involvement with assisting Dr. Loomis when he identifies his daughter's dead body. Blaming Loomis for her murder, Brackett goes home to inform his wife of the news, leaving Deputy Gary Hunt in charge to help Loomis.

Annie as portrayed by Danielle Harris in Halloween II (2009)

In the remake (2007), Annie, as with the original, is Laurie's sassy friend from high school and Lindsey's babysitter. However, her encounters with Michael Myers are different: walking home from school, she spots Michael during the day in this version, and cursingly threatens him from across the street, remarking that her “daddy is the sheriff”, taunting him and inadvertently attracting the madman's brutality. Later, that Halloween night, she goes to leave Lindsey and her babysitting duties to Laurie in order to have a secret date with Paul, her boyfriend (who did not make an onscreen appearance in the original film but is present in the remake), that soon arrives in his car and takes Annie back to Lindsey's house. There, Annie is kissing Paul while stopping his attempts to pull her sweater off, until she agrees and leaves herself topless. Preparing to have sex with Paul, Annie fails to see Michael nearing them until he attacks. While Paul is instantly killed, the frightened Annie makes a run for the front door, almost escaping, but is caught. Michael pulls her back inside, however, she manages to slip away and get a kitchen knife, attempting to face the towering killer. Her resistance quickly ends with Annie captured alive, exposed to Michael's crueler attacks; she is left lying on the floor brutally tortured and bleeding when Laurie brings Lindsey home, although her father finds her still alive some time later due to Laurie having called 9-1-1. In the sequel (2009), Annie, although slightly disfigured with the scars from her near-fatal attack, is shown to be much more stable than Laurie, who is living with Annie and her father. On a Halloween night when she is at home alone, Michael breaks into the Brackett house, seizes the fleeing Annie then stabs her repeatedly off-screen. When she arrives home, Laurie finds Annie on the bathroom floor, naked and severely wounded by Michael. Annie then tries to persuade Laurie to leave the house, without success, until she dies. After receiving a 911 call from his home, Sheriff Lee Brackett finds his daughter's body following Michael's rampage. As in the original film's sequel, Brackett angrily blames Loomis for Annie's death and Laurie's jeopardy. Brackett later uses a rifle to shoot Michael after Dr. Loomis lures Michael into view, which leads to Michael's death at the hands of Laurie.

In Halloween (2018), a sketch of Annie's autopsy appears briefly, behind Dr. Loomis in a sketch of him testifying at Michael's trial for the 1978 murders.

Annie also makes a cameo flashback appearance in Halloween Kills via archival footage from both the original film and the otherwise-ignored Halloween II (1981), when her father sees her corpse on the gurney.

A photograph of Annie with Laurie and Lynda is seen in Halloween Ends.

Character	Appearances											
Character	Halloween	Halloween II	The Return	The Revenge	The Curse	20 Years Later	Resurrectión	Halloween (2007)	Halloween II (2009)	Halloween (2018)	Kills	Ends
Annie Brackett	Death	Corpse						Survivor	Death	Autopsy	Archival footage	Photo

=== Literature ===
Annie appears in the 1979 novelization of the first film, and in other publications based on the original continuity. In the comic Halloween III: The Devil's Eyes from Chaos! Comics, the unstable Laurie, having assumed her brother's mantle, digs up the graves of Annie, Lynda and the latter's boyfriend Bob, placing their skeletons and headstones in Lindsey Wallace's house. Photographs of Annie's corpse appear in the comic book Halloween: Autopsis as photojournalist Patrick Carter becomes fascinated with the pictures of what he believes to be a "perfect corpse". His obsession leads him into investigating Michael Myers, which eventually leads to his death at Michael's hands. Annie also appears in the story "Visiting Hours" of the anniversary comic Halloween: 30 Years of Terror. When Laurie reflects on how her life would have been if she had never encountered Michael Myers, she imagines Annie as having never died and becoming a mother. However, Laurie's fantasy is invaded by the memory of Michael, causing Annie's teenage corpse to appear and accuse Laurie, "If you were smart you'd have stopped him from killing me." Annie's funeral is depicted in the comic miniseries Halloween: The First Death of Laurie Strode, where Laurie describes her as "the best friend I ever had" and wonders what Annie would have thought of how the press covered the news of her death. Brackett is shown attending his daughter's funeral, insisting to Laurie Strode that Michael Myers is dead and gone. While trying to recover from her ordeal, Laurie sees "ghosts" of Annie and Lynda preventing her from moving on. Annie's morgue report appears at the website HalloweenComics.com, revealing information such as her address, date of birth, and middle name, which was Marie. Her immediate cause of death is recorded as "massive blood loss" due to "severed right common carotid artery due to slit throat". The comic book Halloween Autopsis, has Brackett still blaming Dr. Loomis for Annie's murder fifteen years later. However, in the online short story Sam, Brackett visits an older, sick Loomis and tells Marion, "Send him... send him my best wishes."

== Reception ==
Annie Riordan of Brutal as Hell noted the original Annie's influence on the horror genre, saying "She also set a standard for the slasher film, a genre she helped to kickstart, by wandering off alone into a dark room without her pants on. It goes without saying nowadays that girls in horror films will be dispatched the moment their undergarments become visible, but it was a trend that Annie made famous. She dies, panties on prominent display, in the backseat of a station wagon, half strangled and throat slashed. Such are the hazards of premarital sex." Scarlet Jupiter of Dread Central highly praised Harris' interpretation of the character, saying "Danielle Harris brought such power to her role as Annie Brackett that we actually believed her pain after Michael viciously stabbed her multiple times. And let’s be honest; who didn’t feel that boulder in their stomach in Halloween 2 during the bathroom scene? While John Carpenter’s Annie was meant for comic relief, we all grew to love Rob Zombie’s Annie not only for her sense of humor but her adorable personality and were saddened when she met her violent but inevitable end."

== In popular culture ==
In 2020, through a deal between Fourth Castle EMCE Toys, Compass International Pictures and Fright-Rags, Annie was an included character in the officially licensed Halloween Nanoforce® collection of figurines. In 2021, Sideshow and PCS Collectibles featured Annie as a part of a statue figure of Michael Myers. Annie is set to appear in the upcoming IllFonic survival horror video game Halloween: The Game (2026), appearing as a non-player character in the single player story mode and a player character in the multiplayer mode. She is voiced by Kaitlyn Robrock.
