= Nancy Stephens =

American actress

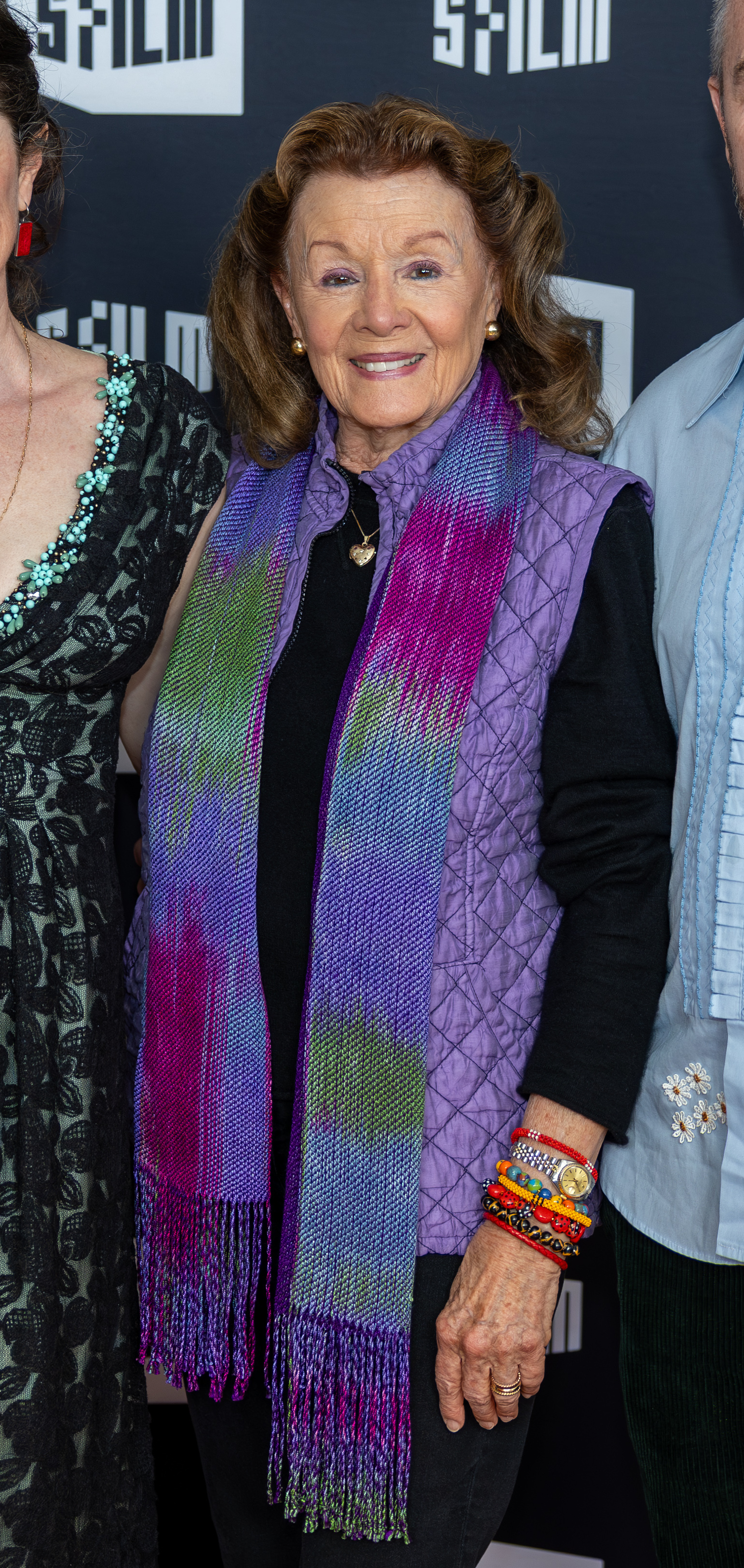
- Stephens in 2026
- Born: July 2, 1949 (age 77); Rusk, Texas, U.S.
- Education: Connecticut College (BA)
- Occupation: Actress
- Years active: 1969–2004; 2021- present
- Known for: Marion Chambers in: Halloween; Halloween II; Halloween H20: 20 Years Later; Halloween: Resurrection; Halloween Kills
- Spouse: Rick Rosenthal (m. 1981)
- Children: 3

Nancy Stephens (born July 2, 1949) is an American actress who has starred in many films and television shows. Stephens is perhaps best known for her role as Nurse Marion Chambers in John Carpenter's horror film Halloween (1978). She reprised this role in Halloween II (1981), Halloween H20: 20 Years Later (1998), Halloween Resurrection (2002), and Halloween Kills (2021).

== Early life ==
Stephens was born July 2, 1949 in Rusk, Texas. Stephens attended the Connecticut College, from which she graduated in 1967.

== Career ==
A life member of The Actors Studio, Stephens starred in the soap opera Bright Promise as Jennifer Matthews from 1969–1970; her first role in a television series. She later appeared in the soap opera Days of Our Lives as Mary Anderson in 1975.

Stephens made her film debut in 1978 in John Carpenter's classic horror Halloween, playing the supporting role of Nurse Marion Chambers, who was attacked by Michael Myers in the film's early scenes. She was cast in John Carpenter's next film in 1981, Escape from New York, and later that year, reprised her role as Marion with the sequel Halloween II, having a much more significant presence on-screen. She appeared in several films such as American Dreamer, Russkies, and D2: The Mighty Ducks, before appearing for the third time as Marion Chambers in Halloween H20: 20 Years Later, the seventh film in the franchise. In 2002 she appeared in A Time for Dancing. Stephens has made guest appearances on many sitcoms such as All in the Family, CHiPs, Cheers, Ally McBeal, and Boston Legal. After a 17-year absence from acting, she reprised the role of Marion Chambers again in David Gordon Green's 2021 sequel Halloween Kills.

Stephens, along with her husband Rick Rosenthal, executive produced the film Invisible Beauty about Bethann Hardison, which premiered at the 2023 Sundance Film Festival.

== Personal life ==
Stephens has been married to Rick Rosenthal since May 23, 1981. Stephens and Rosenthal met while filming Halloween II. They have three children, one of whom is cinematographer Noah Rosenthal.

== Filmography ==
Film and television
Year	Title	Role	Notes
1969–70	Bright Promise	Jennifer Collins Matthews	11 episodes
1971	Medical Center	Sue	1 episode, "The Loser"
1971–72	Mod Squad	Marion Briggs, Girl	2 episodes, "Welcome to Our City", "Crime Club"
1973	The Magician	Francine Powers	1 episode, "Pilot"
1975	Harry O	Receptionist	1 episode, "Double Jeopardy"
1975	Days of Our Lives	Mary Anderson	4 episodes
1976	All in the Family	Anita	1 episode, "New Year's Wedding"
1976	Charlie's Angels	Brooke	1 episode, "The Killing Kind"
1976	Serpico	Gladys	1 episode, "Strike!"
1976	Police Woman	Valerie	1 episode, "The Lifeline Agency"
1976	Executive Suite	Lois	2 episodes, "The Sounds of Silence", "What Are Patterns For?"
1976	The McLean Stevenson Show	Linda	1 episode, "Mac's Fatal Charm"
1976	Barnaby Jones	Ruth Shiller	1 episode, "Fraternity of Thieves"
1977	Panic in Echo Park	—	Television Film
1978	The Hardy Boys/Nancy Drew Mysteries	Mrs. Morgan	1 episode, "Oh Say Can You Sing"
1978	CHiPs	Young Mother	1 episode, "Surf's Up"
1978	Police Story	Nancy Burke	1 episode, "The Broken Badge"
1978	Battered	Jackie	Television Film
1978	Halloween	Marion Chambers	Major film
1979	Death Car on the Freeway	Christine	Television Film
1981	Flamingo Road	—	1 episode, "Secrets"
1981	Escape from New York	Stewardess	
1981	Halloween II	Marion Chambers	Major film
1984	American Dreamer	Jacqueline	
1987	Russkies	Nurse	
1988	Terrorist on Trial: The United States vs. Salim Ajami	Ginny Delmore	Television Film
1989	Everybody's Baby: The Rescue of Jessica McClure	2nd Reporter	Television Film
1990-91	Life Goes On	Sharon Galloway	2 episodes, "Brothers", "The Bigger Picture"
1992	Cheers	Customer #2	1 episode, "License to Hill"
1993	Picket Fences	Mrs. Kendall	1 episode, "The Body Politic"
1993	Barbarians at the Gate	Kravis' Maid	Television Film
1993	Empty Cradle	Foster Mother	Television Film
1994	D2: The Mighty Ducks	Coliseum Reporter	
1994	Beverly Hills, 90210	Nurse Helen	2 episodes, "Mr. Walsh Goes to Washington", "What I Did on My Summer Vacation and Other Stories"
1996	Dark Skies	Mrs. Bach	2 episodes, "The Awakening", "Inhuman Nature"
1998	Halloween H20: 20 Years Later	Marion Chambers-Whittington	
1998–99	Ally McBeal	Judge Washington, Dr. Karp	2 episodes, "Body Language", "Buried Pleasures"
2000	Providence	Dr. Blake	1 episode, "Family Ties"
2002	A Time for Dancing	Mrs. Hillman	
2002	Halloween: Resurrection	Marion Chambers-Whittington	(Archive Footage uncredited)
2004	Boston Legal	Judge Wilcox	1 episode, "Questionable Characters"
2010	Halloween: The Inside Story	Herself/ Marion Chambers (uncredited)	
2014	Cinemassacre's Monster Madness	Herself/ Marion Chambers (archive footage)	1 episode, "Insidious"
2021	Halloween Kills	Marion Chambers	
2024	Ladybug	Rosalee	
