= Adam Weisman =

American actor and casting director (born 1986)

- Born: July 29, 1986 (age 40); United States
- Occupations: Actor, casting director

Adam Weisman (born July 29, 1986) is an American actor and casting director. As an actor, he is probably best known for his role as Steve Haley in Rob Zombie's Halloween. He later transitioned into casting, working on several prominent animated series.

== Filmography ==
=== Acting ===
- Halloween (2007) as Steven "Steve" Haley
- Hatchet (2006) as Halloween Skeleton
- In Justice (TV series) as Martin Lewiki (2006, one episode)
- Over There (TV series) as Kid in Airplane (2005, one episode)
- Desperate Housewives (TV series) as Ian (2004, one episode)
- 7th Heaven (1998–2007) (TV series) as Andrew (2004, one episode)
- Toolbox Murders (2004) as Austin Sterling
- Little Man on Campus (2000) as Archie
- Roswell as Preteen Boy Tourist (1999, one episode)
- The Visitor (1998) as Young Kid #3
- Bio-Dome (1996) as Young Bud

=== Casting Director ===
- Common Side Effects (TV series)
- In the Know (TV series)

=== Casting Associate ===
- Fired on Mars (TV series)
- The Great North (TV series)
- Central Park (TV series)
- Bob's Burgers (TV series)
- Chicago Party Aunt (TV series)
- Broke (TV series)
- The Big Show Show (TV series)
