= Ellie Cornell =

American actress and producer

- Occupations: Actress; film producer
- Years active: 1988–2020

Ellie Cornell is an American actress and producer. She made her film debut in the 1988 film Married to the Mob before becoming known for her roles as Rachel Carruthers in Halloween 4: The Return of Michael Myers (1988) and Halloween 5: The Revenge of Michael Myers (1989), and as Detective Janet Wright in the TV series Femme Fatales.

== Filmography ==
Film roles
Year	Film	Role	Notes
1988	Married to the Mob	Pushy Reporter	
1988	Halloween 4: The Return of Michael Myers	Rachel Carruthers	
1989	Halloween 5: The Revenge of Michael Myers	Rachel Carruthers	
1999	Free Enterprise	Suzanne Crawford	Also executive producer
2000	The Specials	Linda	Uncredited
2003	House of the Dead	Coast Guard Officer Jordan Casper	
2005	All Souls Day	Sarah White	
2005	House of the Dead 2	Colonel Jordan Casper	
2006	The Thirst	Nurse Linda	
2006	Room 6	Sarah	
2006	The Darkroom	Dr. Allen	
2006	Dead Calling	Tina Prescott	
2009	Reconciliation	Ellie	
2011	Caught on Tape	Wagner	
2020	Green House	Beth Green	Short film
2020	Dead Reckoning	Jennifer Crane	

Television roles
Year	Title	Role	Notes
1988	Thirtysomething	Andrea	Episode: "Tenure"
1989	ABC Afterschool Specials	Patty Adams	Episode: "Just Tipsy, Honey"
1990	Gabriel's Fire	Student	Episode: "The Descent"
1990	Chips, the War Dog	Kathy Lloyd	Television film
2006	Dead and Deader	Dr. Adams	Television film
2010	The Event	Maria Olsen	Episode: "I Haven't Told You Everything"
2011–2012	Femme Fatales	Detective Janet Wright	4 episodes

== Producer ==
- Free Enterprise (1998) executive producer, as Ellie Gottwald
- Where No Fan Has Gone Before: The Making of Free Enterprise (1999) executive producer, as Ellie Gottwald
- The Specials (2000)
