= Nancy Kyes =

American actress

- Kyes as Annie Brackett in Halloween (1978)
- Other name: Nancy Loomis
- Occupation: Actress
- Years active: 1976–1992, 2024–present

Nancy Kyes, known professionally as Nancy Loomis, is an American actress. A frequent collaborator of filmmaker John Carpenter, she portrayed Annie Brackett in Halloween (1978) and also appeared in his films Assault on Precinct 13 (1976) and The Fog (1980). She reprised her role as Annie in Halloween II (1981) and made an appearance as a different character in the stand-alone Halloween III: Season of the Witch (1982), her last film role until Hauntology in 2024.

== Career ==
Before starring in Halloween, she played Julie in the 1976 thriller Assault on Precinct 13, also directed by Carpenter. In addition to acting, she served as the film's wardrobe mistress, but she used a different name for the film credits ("Louise Kyes" for the wardrobe mistress credit and "Nancy Loomis" for her acting credit).

In 1980, Kyes played the role of Sandy Fadel in Carpenter's hit horror film, The Fog, in which she appeared with her Halloween co-star Jamie Lee Curtis, her Assault on Precinct 13 co-star Darwin Joston, and Charles Cyphers, who appeared with Kyes in both Halloween and Assault on Precinct 13.

In 1981, Kyes filmed a new scene to be inserted into the television version of Halloween, and filmed a brief cameo appearance as the now-deceased Annie for Halloween II. Kyes had a small role in Halloween III: Season of the Witch (1982) as the ex-wife of the lead character, played by Tom Atkins. This made her the only person to appear in the first three Halloween films.

Although she has starred in a few TV movies, her only guest appearance on television was on the 1985 revival of The Twilight Zone.

After retiring from acting, she worked as a sculptor in the Los Angeles area along with teaching theatre courses at Cal Poly Pomona.

She returned to acting in 2024 with the horror anthology Hauntology.

== Filmography ==
Film
Year	Title	Role	Director
1976	Assault on Precinct 13	Julie	John Carpenter
1978	The Sea Gypsies	Girlfriend	Stewart Raffill
1978	Halloween	Annie Brackett	John Carpenter
1980	The Fog	Sandy Fadel	John Carpenter
1981	Halloween II	Annie Brackett (cameo)	Rick Rosenthal
1982	Halloween III: Season of the Witch	Linda Challis	Tommy Lee Wallace
2024	Hauntology	Mrs. Josephine Cashel	Parker Brennon

Television
Year	Title	Role	Notes
1982	Not in Front of the Children	Reporter	TV movie
1985	The Twilight Zone	Frumpy Housewife	Season 1, Episode 4 (segment "Little Boy Lost")
1992	Lady Boss	Doctor	TV movie

Other appearances
Year	Title	Notes
2006	Halloween: 25 Years of Terror	Video documentary
2006	Halloween: The Shape of Horror	Short
2006	Going to Pieces: The Rise and Fall of the Slasher Film	Documentary
2007–2022	Cinemassacre's Monster Madness	Documentary TV series (3 episodes)
2010	Halloween: The Inside Story	Documentary
2010	A History of Horror	Miniseries documentary
2013	The Sassy One With Nancy Loomis	Video short
2019	WiHM Massive Blood Drive PSA: Wilde About Blood	Video short
2021	The Movies That Made Us	Season 3, Episode 1
2021	Cinema Insomnia	Season 16, Episode 17
2021	Halloween Kills	Archival footage
2022	Halloween Ends	Archival footage
