= Samuel Loomis =

Dr. Samuel Loomis
- Halloween character
- Top: Donald Pleasence as Dr. Samuel Loomis (1978); Bottom: Malcolm McDowell as Dr. Samuel Loomis (2007)
- First appearance: Halloween (1978)
- Last appearance: Halloween: The Game (video game; 2026)
- Portrayed by: Donald Pleasence (1978–95); Malcolm McDowell (2007–09); Tom Jones Jr. (2021) (body double)
- Voiced by: Tom Kane (Halloween H20: 20 Years Later); Colin Mahan (Halloween (2018), Halloween Kills, Halloween: The Game)

In-universe information
- Full name: Samuel J. Loomis
- Occupation: Psychiatrist
- Nationality: British
- Status: Alive (Implied in the Thorn continuity/H6 Producer’s Cut); Deceased (Original 1981 H2 & H20, and the Zombie reboot and Universal/Blumhouse continuities)

Dr. Samuel J. Loomis is a fictional character in the Halloween franchise. A main protagonist of the overall series, Loomis appears on-screen in eight of the thirteen Halloween films (and is mentioned or featured in photographs and audio recordings in others), first appearing in John Carpenter's original 1978 film. Donald Pleasence portrayed the character in five films, with Malcolm McDowell taking on the role in the 2007 reimagining and its sequel. In both portrayals, Loomis is introduced as the psychiatrist of series antagonist Michael Myers, driven to pursue and restrain his murderous former patient. He also appears in a flashback in Halloween Kills.

Dr. Loomis's name was derived from Sam Loomis, played by John Gavin in the 1960 film Psycho.

== Appearances ==
=== Films ===
==== Original continuity ====
An infographic illustrating the continuity between the Halloween films. Loomis's role and fate differs across the various continuities.

Dr. Samuel Loomis first appears in the original Halloween (1978). Assigned as the psychiatrist to six-year-old Michael Myers after the boy killed his own sister, Loomis spent eight years trying to understand and treat Myers before coming to the conclusion he was "purely and simply evil" and advocating Myers never be released. Fifteen years after Myers' first murder, Loomis and colleague Marion Chambers prepare to escort Michael from Smith's Grove Sanitarium to court; Loomis plans to give Michael Thorazine to ensure he will have no chance to be released back to society. However, upon arrival they find that the sanitarium's patients are wandering loose, and in the confusion an escaped Michael steals their car. Loomis suspects Michael plans to return to his hometown of Haddonfield, Illinois; investigating the Haddonfield cemetery he discovers Judith Myers' tombstone is missing. He meets with Sheriff Leigh Brackett, and the two begin their search at Michael's former home. While a skeptical Sheriff Brackett patrols the streets, the doctor stays at the house believing that Michael may desire to return "home". Loomis hears two children frantically fleeing a nearby house; investigating, he finds Michael attacking Laurie Strode. Loomis draws his revolver and shoots Michael six times, knocking him off the balcony, but when he goes to check Michael's body he finds it missing. An unsurprised Loomis stares off into the night, while Laurie begins sobbing in terror.

Halloween II (1981) begins at the final moments of the first film. Laurie is taken to Haddonfield Memorial Hospital, while Brackett accompanies Loomis in his search for Michael. The pair spots a masked figure that may be Myers, but he is struck by a car and immolated which confounds identification of the body. Sheriff Brackett learns his daughter Annie was killed by Michael, and angrily blames Loomis for letting him escape and leaves the search to Deputy Gary Hunt. Investigation of the burned corpse reveals it was not Myers, whose trail is picked up at the local elementary school. As Loomis investigates he discovers clues connecting Michael to the occult practice of Samhain, suggesting an explanation to his seeming invulnerability and murderous desire. The search is interrupted by a returning Chambers: the governor has ordered Loomis to return immediately to Smith's Grove accompanied by a US Marshal. Along the way, Marion shares that a previously sealed file reveals that Laurie is Michael's sister, adopted by the Strodes after the death of her parents. Realizing that Michael is after Laurie, Loomis forces the Marshal to drive to Haddonfield Memorial at gunpoint. The trio reach the hospital to defend Laurie. As Marion attempts to contact the police, Michael kills the Marshal and chases Loomis and Laurie into an operating theater. Michael stabs Loomis in the stomach, seriously wounding him, but Laurie blinds Michael by shooting him in the eyes. The pair fill the room with oxygen and ether. Laurie flees while Loomis ignites the flammable gases, blowing up the operating room. In the original timeline, Loomis dies in the explosion, while he miraculously survives in the Thorn Timeline (the fourth through sixth films) as he is thrown out of the room by the explosion and is knocked unconscious. Michael, engulfed in flames, staggers out of the room before finally collapsing lifeless in the original timeline, while surviving, albeit in a coma, in the Thorn Timeline.

Halloween 4: The Return of Michael Myers (1988), which begins the Thorn Trilogy, picks the story up ten years after the events of Halloween II. Michael has been comatose since the explosion, but awakens when he learns Laurie Strode has died in a car accident, leaving behind a daughter, Jamie Lloyd. Loomis heads to Haddonfield after learning that Michael has escaped. He follows Michael to a gas station, but Myers escapes in a tow truck and causes an explosion, destroying Loomis's car in the process. Catching a ride to Haddonfield, Loomis warns the new sheriff, Ben Meeker, that Michael has returned. Michael attacks the police station and kills all of the officers. A lynch mob is formed by the town's men to kill Michael once Loomis reveals he's returned, refusing to let Michael cause a massacre and the latter goes to protect Jamie Lloyd from her uncle. After Michael Myers is shot and falls down a mine shaft, Jamie and Rachel are brought back to their foster parents' house, where Loomis arrives with Sheriff Meeker, the former being convinced that Myers has died. Without warning, Jamie stabs her foster mother giving her an appearance similar to six-year-old Michael's first kill. Sheriff Meeker prevents a horrified Loomis from shooting her as the group realizes that Jamie is following in Michael's footsteps.

Halloween 5: The Revenge of Michael Myers (1989) takes place a year later as Loomis is assigned to Jamie at the Haddonfield Children's Clinic. Aware that Michael is still alive, and discovering that Jamie is telepathically linked with him, Loomis constantly pressures her to inform him of Michael's whereabouts, but Jamie is too traumatized to tell him. When Michael returns, Loomis sets a trap for Myers at his house, which involves Jamie performing an eerie recreation of Judith Myers' final moments before her murder. Michael arrives, and Loomis tries to reason with him, proposing that he fight his rage and redeem himself through a positive relationship with Jamie. Loomis's words seem to work at first, as Michael calmly listens to him and lowers his knife, but when Loomis reaches to take away Michael's knife, he subdues him. When Loomis awakens, he uses Jamie as bait, and lures Michael into a trap to weaken him with a tranquilizer gun. After beating Michael unconscious with a wooden plank, Loomis suffers a stroke and collapses.

In Halloween: The Curse of Michael Myers (1995), Loomis has retired and lives as a hermit in a small home on the outskirts of Haddonfield. He is visited by his old colleague Dr. Terence Wynn, chief administrator at Smith's Grove Sanitarium who tries to persuade Loomis to return to Smith's Grove, but the latter declines. At the same time they hear the voice of Jamie Lloyd on the radio begging Loomis to help her. The following morning Jamie's body is discovered, and Loomis is devastated. He is later approached by Tommy Doyle at the hospital who tells him about his discovery of Jamie's child, Steven. It is revealed that Michael is under control of the curse of "Thorn", a power he has been cursed with by a druid cult led by Dr. Wynn since he was a young boy after hearing voices telling him to kill his family. After this discovery, Loomis and Tommy are drugged and later follow Wynn to Smith's Grove who abducted Danny, his mother, and Steven with the help of his cult followers. Wynn reveals that Jamie's baby represents a new cycle of Michael's evil that he kept secret from most of the cult who were focused on inflicting the curse onto a new child, Danny. Loomis is knocked unconscious after criticizing Wynn. Later, Michael butchers Wynn's team of staff surgeons and Wynn himself during a medical procedure with Danny and Steven sitting in a room next door. Tommy then joins forces with Kara Strode (Danny's mother and Laurie Strode's cousin) in order to protect Jamie's baby from Michael. They succeed, and after regaining consciousness, Loomis helps them escape the hospital while Tommy subdues Michael by injecting him with large quantities of tranquilizers. As Tommy, Kara, Danny, and Steven leave, Loomis refuses to come with them as he has "a little business to attend to". Back inside the building, as seen in the theatrical version, Michael's mask is shown lying on the floor of the lab room, and Loomis is heard screaming in the background, leaving the fate of both men unknown.

In the original "Producer's Cut" of the film, after telling the others he has got "a little business to attend to", Loomis walks back into the sanitarium to find a seemingly defeated Michael lying on the floor of the main hallway, after being stopped by Tommy, who used runes. Upon removing the mask, Loomis finds Dr. Wynn, who was forced by Michael to switch outfits so he could escape. With his dying breath, Wynn grabs Loomis's hand and says, "It's your game now, Dr. Loomis." After Wynn dies, the Thorn symbol appears on Loomis's wrist; realizing now that the Thorn Curse has passed on to him, and that he himself is now to act as the leader of the cult, Loomis screams in terror and disgust.

==== H20 continuity ====
Ignoring the events of the previous three films, Halloween H20: 20 Years Later (1998) establishes that Michael Myers survived the hospital explosion in 1978 and has been missing for twenty years since then. He arrives and kills Marion Chambers at Loomis's retirement house. Two investigators discuss what they know about Loomis's life in this alternate version of the series, following the events of the first two films. Having also survived the explosion in 1978, Loomis was under Marion's care at this house in his final years before dying. However, even after nearly 20 years, Loomis refused to believe that Michael was dead, and devoted the rest of his life to studying all information about his former patient. The two investigators enter his private study, and find that the walls are covered with photographs, sketches, and newspaper articles about Michael. During the opening credits, Loomis' speech to Brackett about his first meeting with Michael is heard in a voiceover (provided by Tom Kane).

==== Remake continuity ====
A new version of Dr. Samuel Loomis appears in the remake (2007). In the film, Dr. Loomis seems not to have contempt for Michael, and Michael doesn't truly see him as his nemesis. Their relationship with one another is more of a tragic friendship. Loomis does not immediately shoot Michael, but tries to reason with him. Loomis is first seen as a child psychiatrist brought in by ten-year-old Michael Myers' school to speak with Michael's mother, Deborah. After seeing the various animals Michael has tortured and killed, he recommends that the boy get help. After Michael commits four murders on Halloween, he is put under Loomis's care at Smith's Grove Sanitarium. On some days the two talk peacefully, on others Michael has outbursts of violent rage. Fifteen years later, Loomis writes a best-selling book based on Michael's treatment called "The Devil's Eyes". On his last day at Smith's Grove, Loomis tells Michael that he has tried but cannot help him anymore. He also tells Michael that he has become something like his best friend.

After Michael escapes, Loomis concludes that his former patient is going to Haddonfield. Once there, he enlists the help of Sheriff Lee Brackett, and also buys a gun. Loomis comes to believe that Michael has returned to find his little sister, Laurie, who Brackett helped get adopted by the Strodes after her mother committed suicide. Michael succeeds in tracking Laurie down, killing her friends and two police officers in the process. Loomis is alerted of Michael capturing Laurie by Tommy Doyle and Lyndsey Wallace, the children Laurie is babysitting, and sets off to the Myers house. There he confronts Michael as he approaches Laurie, begging Michael to stop, but as Michael ignores him and continues forward, Loomis is left with no choice but to shoot Michael. Loomis rescues Laurie, but Michael soon reawakens to continue the attack on his sister. Loomis again tries to reason with him at which point Michael lets Laurie go and subdues Loomis. In the unrated version of the film, when Michael is in pursuit of Laurie through the house, Loomis grabs his foot to try and stop him. Michael shakes him off and Loomis blacks out. In the film's original ending, Loomis is successful in convincing Michael to let go of Laurie as he is surrounded by police officers, telling Michael he "did the right thing". Despite Loomis's protests, however, Michael is killed shortly afterwards in a hail of gunfire, and the film ends with Loomis looking down sadly at his former patient's corpse.

In the sequel to the remake (2009), Loomis's character is revised; he is now seen as a greedy, arrogant mercenary who is profiting from the murders of the previous film. He does not believe Michael is alive and becomes annoyed and angry when asked about it. He goes on a tour to promote a new book, "The Devil Walks Among Us", while his assistant is shown to be disgusted with his campaign. In the climax of the film Loomis, after realizing Michael is still alive, realizes that he has changed for the worse and tries to save Laurie, this time unarmed. Michael ambushes Loomis and kills him by slashing his face and stabbing him in the chest. In the unrated director's cut, Michael tackles Loomis out of the shack and then stabs him in the stomach while Loomis is still trying to reason with him. With Loomis dead, the police open fire on Michael, killing him as well. Laurie, now completely insane, leaves the shack, picks up Michael's knife and walks over to Loomis's body. Against Brackett's orders, the police open fire on Laurie, apparently killing her too.

==== Blumhouse continuity ====
Halloween (2018) is a direct sequel to the first film, ignoring all other series entries. Taking place forty years later, it is established that Michael was arrested following his 1978 killing spree and has spent the last forty years imprisoned in Smith's Grove Sanitarium. Loomis does not appear in-person, having died an unspecified time ago prior to the film's events. True crime podcasters uncover a 1979 audio recording of Loomis (voiced by Colin Mahan) giving a statement on his "former patient", advocating for Myers' execution and immediate cremation and voicing a desire to witness as Myers is put to death and destroyed. Michael's new psychiatrist, Dr. Ranbir Sartain (Haluk Bilginer), is established as a former student of Loomis's and even referred to as "the new Loomis" by Laurie Strode; however, he has a different perspective on Michael than Loomis's belief that he is "pure evil".

In the sequel, Halloween Kills (2021) Loomis (portrayed by Tom Jones Jr., and voiced by Mahan) is depicted in flashbacks portraying Myers' detainment by police forty years prior in the aftermath of his 1978 killing spree (events briefly mentioned in the prior film). Haddonfield officer Hawkins encountered Michael at the Myers residence, shortly before the arrival of Loomis accompanied by the rest of the police department. The doctor questions Hawkins if Michael killed the officer's partner, but gets no response. Loomis attempts to execute the detained Michael, but is stopped by a remorseful Hawkins who did not believe Michael deserved death for his crimes. Decades later, an older Hawkins blames himself for the deaths following Michael's 2018 escape and feels tremendous guilt for stopping Loomis that night.

Appearances
Halloween	Halloween II	The Return	The Revenge	The Curse	20 Years Later	Resurrection	Halloween (2007)	Halloween II (2009)	Halloween (2018)	Kills	Ends
Survivor	Death	Survivor (retconned)		Survivor (Producer’s Cut); Death (implied in Theatrical Version)	Confirmed dead		Survivor	Death	Confirmed dead	Flashback	

=== Literature ===
Samuel Loomis's first literary appearance was in October 1979, in Curtis Richards' novelization of Halloween, which largely follows the events of the film. He also appeared in the 1981 adaptation of Halloween II written by Jack Martin; it was published alongside the first film sequel, with the novel following the film events, with an additional victim, a reporter, added to the novel. The final novelization to feature Loomis was Halloween IV, released October 1988. The novel was written by Nicholas Grabowsky, and like the previous adaptations, follows the events of Halloween 4: The Return of Michael Myers.

Loomis appears in the online short story Halloween: Sam, focusing on what happened to his character in the H20 timeline after Halloween II. Written by Hutchinson and featuring illustrations from Autopsis' Marcus Smith, Sam is a prose short story available exclusively for download at the website HalloweenComics.com. It explores the life of Dr. Loomis, including his backstory and relationship with Elizabeth Worthington, a journalist he met during World War II. In 1995, Michael Myers visits the ailing Dr. Loomis in a hospital and murders Elizabeth in front of him. Loomis attempts to stop him, but dies of a coronary failure.

In the comic Halloween: One Good Scare, Loomis is revealed to have a son, David Loomis, who like him, is a doctor at Smith's Grove Sanitarium. Although continuing his father's work, David is careful not to inherit his obsession with Michael Myers. However, when Lindsey Wallace is admitted to Smith's Grove claiming that Michael is stalking her, he finds history repeating itself. David neglects his other patients to interview Lindsey, investigates Michael's history, and even visits his childhood home in Haddonfield. However, on Halloween night in 2003, Michael arrives at Smith's Grove, murdering his way through the staff to get to Lindsey. David tries to protect her, but his fear gets the better of him and he hides as Michael drags Lindsey away to her death. Michael leaves behind a cracked picture frame containing a photograph of David and his father, a message that he plans to return for him.

=== Video games ===
==== Halloween: The Game (2026) ====
Loomis appears as a playable character in the 2026 multiplayer survival horror game Halloween: The Game, voiced by Colin Mahan, who previously voiced him in Halloween (2018) and Halloween Kills (2021). In the game's multiplayer mode, players may choose between two sides: playing as Michael Myers himself, or in a group of civilians trying to stop his killing spree. For the latter option, players may initially pick from a selection of young civilian characters. If a player civilian is killed by Myers, their teammates can use a CB radio to call for help, allowing the deceased player to return to the match as Loomis. Loomis's equipment includes a flashlight with which he can temporarily blind Michael, a loaded six-shooter, and six extra bullets. Unlike standard civilian characters, Loomis is able to initiate an effort to detain Michael when he is temporarily incapacitated, which, if done successfully, will automatically end the match. Loomis also appears in the game's single-player story mode that follows the events of the 1978 film, albeit exclusively from the perspective of Michael.

== Characterization ==
Scott Froehlich describes Loomis in Halloween "as the uncommissioned bounty hunter attempting to return his patient to the institution. His character provides insight into Myers' motives, or lack thereof, and fills the audience in on how disturbed the masked murderer truly is." Brad Miska refers to Loomis as the film's "hero figure" who calls Michael "it" in a series of acts of depersonalization of his patient. Miska explains Loomis as believing Michael is inhuman, furthering that Loomis spends much of the film as "one of the few individuals (but not the only one) to fear and acknowledge the threat Michael presents and immediately speculates that he will return to Haddonfield – and we, of course, know he's right." Josh Greally calls Loomis one of film's "greatest harbingers of doom" and adds that in spite of Loomis barely interacting with Myers in the film, Loomis "instils a sense of fear in the audience for how calmly assured he is of Michael's evil nature. He knows what Michael is capable of and that he is the only one who can stop him." Doug Bradley observes that Dr. Loomis "spends a lot of the film warning people they don't know what they are dealing with" and this provides Michael with "this supernatural, mysterious element that made him so powerful." Dustin Putman views Pleasence as having brought "authority, dignity, and vulnerability" to the Loomis role and defines the character as "a man who once cared for Michael, who can't help but feel as if he still shares a bond with him, but who has grown wearisome because he now knows that there is no way of getting through to him."

Commentary on Loomis in the original film extends to discussing how his character relates to Laurie Strode. David McCallister notes the differences between Loomis and Laurie in their interactions with Michael in the original film that work together to form "a fantastic dynamic with" Myers that also demonstrates "an underlying look at how some perceive evil and how others like Loomis see mental health and the 'science' of people like Michael Myers." SciFiFX credits the film for focusing on Laurie more than Loomis, viewing him as being efficient "at telling everyone what sort of evil this man is. He makes sure everyone knows what sort of creature he believes Michael to be." M. Keith Booker, who saw Loomis as "playing the strict father to Michael", observes that "Loomis's pursuit of Michael is so relentless that he becomes a sort of stalker figure in his own right, providing a third term that complicates the eventual moral opposition between Michael and innocent Final Girl Laurie Strode that enhances the allegorical structure of the film by providing a figure of righteous masculine authority so uncompromising that he becomes a sort of official representative of the structures and systems that somehow created Michael in the first place."

In Halloween 2, Geoff Cox asserts, viewers "witness Loomis grow increasingly more exasperated that Michael's still on the loose, confused about how he took bullets to the chest and walked away but vindicated in his belief that Myers is less a man and more a force of pure evil." Devon Elson observes that the early demise of a Michael lookalike "mechanically serves as a narrative reset to have the police disbelieve Loomis again." John Hansen notes Loomis being blamed by Brackett for his daughter Annie's death despite Loomis spending years trying to keep Michael contained, and reasons that "there would be ample reason for Loomis to lose his mind, but as far as I can tell, his behavior and actions are perfectly in line with the reality of Michael's killing spree". Seth Harris assesses that Loomis "really goes over the deep end throughout" the second film and becomes a lunatic just as out of control as Michael himself. Harris opines that this is when Loomis works best, as "a madman, obsessed with killing this force of nature, he feels responsible for." Kayleena Pierce-Bohen praises Halloween II as being where Pleasence shaped "Loomis into a more complex hero" who helped create the Myers mythos: "If Myers is the ultimate evil, then Dr. Loomis is the ultimate force for good, standing up to the forces of darkness with kindness in his heart, over and over again."

Loomis is depicted in Halloween 4 with burn scars from his near-fatal injuries at the end of Halloween 2. Alan Smithee observed Loomis as "more world weary than ever" with physical scars to evidence his worry. Adam Tyner wrote that Loomis served as "more than just connective tissue with the first two films in the franchise. It makes the world of Haddonfield feel more real...more lived-in...that there are consequences that linger and matter." Jack Wilhelmi viewed the inclusion of the Jamie Lloyd character as giving both Loomis and Michael "a tremendous amount of depth and characterization" and "a foil to build off of and play against." "Within this fourth installment, Loomis brought sympathy and tragedy because of his elderly age," wrote Rodolfo Salas, who equated Pleasence's performance to that of a father who had failed their child and whose attempts to reach Michael "brought about a sense of care, depression, and exhaustion." Salas also notes the contrast between Loomis and his knowledge of Michael and Jamie and her being "nearly unaware of her murderous uncle." Patrick Bromley, who cited the Halloween 4 iteration of the character as his favorite version of Loomis outside of the 1978 film, opined that Loomis's "concern isn't so much for Michael's sanity anymore; it's barely even for the safety of Haddonfield's residents" and that the film "is where Loomis really gives in to obsession, and it's interesting to see the character slide closer and closer to the brink of crazy." James Berardinelli called Pleasence "the stabilizing influence" in his review of Halloween 4 and observed that "the character of Dr. Sam Loomis, even as beaten and broken as he is in the later installments, represents a rock of solidity. The ending of Halloween 4 would not have been as effective without Pleasance's [sic] entirely convincing reaction of unimaginable horror."

The Halloween 5 iteration of Loomis is described as "increasingly unbalanced" by Jason Barr, and as having "apparently lost his mind" by Jesse Sparks, the latter viewing Loomis as having developed an evident mistrust in Jamie and that "his motivations have changed from public servant to becoming strictly personal." Derek Anderson assesses the film as depicting Loomis with an increased obsession with Michael that has been "pushed to a dangerous and almost selfish level." Anderson explains that Loomis views himself as the only one who can stop Michael and "knowing that he may not have much time left on this Earth, his growing obsession with ending Myers at any cost is a believable progression in a character who has dedicated the second half of his life to containing and obliterating the evil that lives within Michael—even if it means putting Jamie squarely in harm's way." Berardinelli theorizes that "one could construct an argument that the good doctor's obsession, combined with the various physical and mental experiences he has gone through, might have taken him off the deep end" and that Loomis could be argued as having become just as deranged as Michael.

Daniel Farrands, writer of The Curse of Michael Myers, cited his intent to give Loomis an arc in the film, depicting Loomis as living in seclusion and seemingly having put his past with Michael behind him while writing a book about his patient. Farrands explained, "I thought that was a great way to start with him. Start him in a place of relative peace and end up right back in hell." He wanted the film to conclude "with this incredible battle for Michael Myers' soul between the good doctor and the evil doctor" and that he had written the part of Dr. Wynn with "the idea of casting a serious equal for Donald." Culture Crypt notes that Loomis "never even confronts Michael Myers one single time in Halloween 6, often doing his own thing on a parallel arc to what Tommy Doyle and the Strodes do on the main one." Mark Ziobro expresses that Loomis "is not so much ranting and raving about how evil Michael is, but has accepted it" and has become a realist. Ziobro furthers that the filmmakers ran with the belief that Michael was unstoppable, as espoused by Loomis, "and leave his continued existence unanswered." In the first appearance of Loomis in the film, he is listening to a radio host who mistakes him as having been deceased, to which he replies, "Not dead, just very much retired." Richard Harrington, and Alan Jones have noted the line as being an epitaph for Pleasence.

Due to both being doctors who serve as the archenemy to a supernatural antagonist, a number of commentators have compared Loomis to Dracula foe Abraham Van Helsing; the list includes Kyron Lewis, Christian Bone, Tony Fyler, Cody Hamman, and Padraig Cotter. Alternatively, Wicked Horror's Nat Brehmer argues, "Sam Loomis is not, when you break the character down and really study him, the Van Helsing of the Halloween series because Van Helsing was brought into the middle of a story he had no personal stake in." Brehmer likens Loomis to a personification of the Cassandra myth as Loomis is "someone who basically has a premonition" and "tries to warn everyone, and nobody listens, so exactly what he was trying to stop from happening just happens as scheduled."

== Casting ==
Carpenter's first choice for the role of Dr. Loomis was Peter Cushing, famous for his roles in Hammer Horror films; however, as he had just been in the high-profile Star Wars, Cushing's agent rejected the offer out of hand due to the low salary. Christopher Lee was also approached for the role; he too turned it down, although the actor would later tell Carpenter and Hill that declining the role was the biggest mistake he made during his career. Producer Irwin Yablans then suggested Pleasence, who agreed to star because his daughter Lucy, a guitarist, had enjoyed Assault on Precinct 13 for Carpenter's score. Nancy Stephens reflected, "The thrill for me in the first Halloween was that I got to work with Donald Pleasence." Tony Moran, who briefly portrays Michael when his mask is removed, initially refused to do the film until learning that Pleasence was involved. While filming the final scene of the movie, where Michael is revealed to have disappeared after being shot by Loomis and falling off a balcony, Pleasence asked Carpenter if he should do an expression of surprise or an "I knew this would happen'?" Carpenter, "too naive to know the right answer", asked Pleasence if he could do both, to which Pleasence complied.

Halloween II was supposed to be the last film in the Halloween franchise to revolve around Michael Myers. After the 1982 release of Halloween III: Season of the Witch, the lowest performing film in the series at the time, executive producer Moustapha Akkad wanted to make a sequel that brought back Michael Myers. On February 25, 1988, writer Alan B. McElroy, a Cleveland, Ohio native, was brought in to write the script for Halloween 4. McElroy wanted to open the film with Loomis being thrown from the explosion at the end of Halloween II as a way of explaining how he survived. This was vetoed by director Dwight H. Little, who "didn't want to get tied up with a lot of 'logic police' questions about Michael and exactly what happened to Dr. Loomis, exactly what happened at the end of the hospital [sequence]." Little furthered that he did not want to be influenced by anything besides the original film.

In reprising his role in Halloween 4, Pleasence became the only actor from the first two films to return. According to Little, Pleasence was "committed conceptually" to the role, but did not sign on to the project until having read a finished screenplay. Little reflected that he had been impressed by Pleasence's performance in The Great Escape (1963). He asserted that Pleasence "carried a lot of film history and he carried a lot of weight as an actor" but was open to collaborating on scenes and Little would arrange a schedule to accommodate his health: "I did notice that after about four or five hours he would get quite tired. I don't know if that was age or he was suffering with something. I started working with the AD to make sure we would do anything demanding in those first four to six hours, then for the last few hours just take it easy with him." Ellie Cornell, who portrayed Rachel Carruthers in Halloween 4 and its sequel, called working with Pleasence "a huge honour" and recalled that Pleasence could "nail his scenes" very quickly before leaving. According to Cornell, Pleasence would stay at a different hotel from the rest of the cast and "was kind of on his own, but he was just tremendously professional, just so supportive." Pleasence portrayed the character until his death in 1995; Halloween: The Curse of Michael Myers was released posthumously and dedicated to his memory.

In 1998's Halloween H20, the voice of Dr. Loomis is heard giving the same speech that he gave to Sheriff Brackett when they were inside Michael's abandoned childhood home in the original film. Sound-alike voice actor Tom Kane provided this voice-over rather than archival recordings of Pleasence. An audio recording of Loomis is featured in 2018's Halloween; Loomis is voiced by Colin Mahan. For Halloween Kills, Loomis was physically portrayed by the film's construction foreman Tom Jones Jr., whose resemblance to Pleasence was enhanced with prosthetic makeup; Mahan again provided the voice via dubbing.

== Reception ==
With both the death of the character and the man who’d given him life, an entire era of the franchise was brought to a close. Even if the Halloween series continues forever, there will never be another Loomis like the one seen in those first six movies, nor will there ever be another Donald Pleasence.

— Nat Brehmer

Empire ranked Loomis as the 18th best horror movie character. In 2016, Dread Central ranked Loomis in second place (only behind Anthony Perkins as Norman Bates) on their Top 5 Most Powerful Performances in Horror History Since 1960! list, opining that Pleasence spoke "with pitch-perfectly clear intention" and created "one of the greatest characters in film history" in the original film. Screen Rant listed Loomis as the second best Halloween character (behind Michael Myers), asserting that "Pleasance [sic] truly gives one of the best performances in Horror films as the determined doctor." /Film cites Loomis as the greatest character John Carpenter made over his five-decade career. Joe Puccio described Loomis as legendary and called Pleasence "arguably the crown jewel of the series". Meagan Navarro called Loomis the pillar of the Halloween franchise and asserted that "Pleasance [sic] always gave Loomis his all, no matter where the story took his character." Matthew Chernov of the Chicago Tribune asserts that Pleasence gave credibility to Loomis' ominous warnings and that the actor "never gave anything less than 100 percent on screen", citing this as the reason "why, for many fans, he remains the series' stealth MVP."

Justin Davis of Complex praised Pleasence and Jamie Lee Curtis for "star-making performances" in Halloween. Ron Pennington of The Hollywood Reporter wrote that Pleasence as Loomis provided "a strong presence, but it's basically a one-dimensional role, designed to provide necessary plot information." Berardinelli referred to Pleasence as the "saving grace of Halloween II" and that the film "belongs to Loomis, the gun-toting action figure who arrives in the nick of time and has more good one-liners than everyone else put together." Discussing Halloween 4, Vinnie Mancuso cited Pleasence as "absolutely hamming it up to a new level". Cox wrote that bringing back Pleasence as Loomis was one of the "major things" Halloween 4 did correctly and that the film was "anchored by solid performances from Pleasence and Harris". Reviewing The Curse of Michael Myers, Ben Martin lauded Pleasence for giving "a good performance again. So good in fact that I'm reminded of why I liked Loomis in the first place."

While admitting that Loomis was "the most interesting" character in Halloween 4, Edison Smith viewed him as suffering the most from the film's repetition of the Myers storyline, with Pleasence's "once-iconic turn beginning to smack of self-parody" whose only growth was "becoming a John McClane style action hero who crashes through windows and leaps fifty feet through the air to avoid gas station explosions". The character's portrayal in Halloween 5 has also received negative reception, with Richard Harrington of the Los Angeles Times rebuking Pleasence for giving "a flat two-note performance". A.A. Dowd of The A.V. Club writes that by the time of Halloween 5, "Donald Pleasence's shtick had shaded into self-parody. He spends most of this regrettable fourth sequel bellowing into a little girl's face like a lunatic." Commentary was directed toward the reduced role of Loomis in The Curse of Michael Myers, with Marc Savlov of The Austin Chronicle calling the role "hardly more than an extended cameo", and Jeremy Nichols lamenting that Pleasence's "role was cut down significantly so we don't get to see him much." Eric Hatch and Berardinelli, both of whom disliked the sixth film, bemoaned that it was Pleasence's last appearance in the series, with Sparks asserting that "Pleasance [sic] deserved better, especially at the end of his career."

== In popular culture ==
Loomis has been featured in merchandise. In 2020, NECA released a figure of Loomis alongside Laurie Strode based on their appearance in Halloween II (1981). NECA produced a two-pack of 7-inch figures of Loomis and Michael from Halloween II to celebrate the film's fortieth anniversary the following year.

Loomis has also been referenced in media. In the season eight episode of The Simpsons entitled "Hurricane Neddy", after Dr. Foster discovers that Ned Flanders has gone mad, he states, "May god have mercy on us all!" The episode's DVD commentary clarifies this as a reference to Loomis' reaction to Michael escaping at the start of the original film. In the 2010 The Boondocks episode "Smokin' with Cigarettes", the Dr. Doomis character is based on Loomis and voiced by his H20 voice actor Tom Kane. In the 1996 film Scream, Skeet Ulrich's character Billy Loomis is named after him. The fifth film in the Scream series stars Melissa Barrera as Sam Carpenter, who is revealed to be Billy's daughter, with her technical name being a nod to the Halloween character. Nicholas Brooks of Comic Book Resources writes extensively on the connections between Barrera and Pleasence's characters. In the 1985 Mexican slasher film Cemetery of Terror, Hugo Stiglitz plays the psychiatrist of the film's antagonist in a role inspired by Loomis. In the 2002 film Blood Feast 2: All U Can Eat, John McConnell and Mark McLachlan play detectives Dave Loomis and Mike Myers, named after the Halloween characters. Max Gail plays a character named Sam Loomis in an episode of NCIS; the episode also features characters named after Halloween characters Tommy Doyle and Bob Simms. Jamie Lee Curtis described her portrayal of Laurie Strode in the 2018 Halloween film as being similar to Loomis: "Laurie has been traumatized and Laurie also understands Michael Myers in a way that nobody else does. So, in a weird way, she's become the new Loomis character because Loomis was the one who understood that he [Michael] needed to be stopped because he was pure evil."

== Works cited ==
- Little, Dwight H. (2013) [2006]. Halloween 4: The Return of Michael Myers (Audio commentary; Blu-ray). Anchor Bay Entertainment/Scream Factory.
- Smith, Steve; et al. (2003). Halloween: A Cut Above the Rest (Documentary). Prometheus Entertainment.
