= Tony Moran =

Tony Moran may refer to:

- Tony Moran (DJ)
- Tony Moran (actor)
