= Halloween (2007 film) =

Film by Rob Zombie

- Theatrical release poster
- Directed by: Rob Zombie
- Screenplay by: Rob Zombie
- Based on: Halloween by: John Carpenter; Debra Hill
- Produced by: Malek Akkad; Andy Gould; Rob Zombie
- Starring: Malcolm McDowell; Sheri Moon Zombie; Tyler Mane; Scout Taylor-Compton; Brad Dourif; Danielle Harris; William Forsythe
- Cinematography: Phil Parmet
- Edited by: Glenn Garland
- Music by: Tyler Bates
- Production companies: Dimension Films; Nightfall Productions; Spectacle Entertainment Group; Trancas International Films
- Distributed by: Metro-Goldwyn-Mayer (United States); The Weinstein Company (International)
- Release date: August 31, 2007 (United States)
- Running time: 110 minutes
- Country: United States
- Language: English
- Budget: $15 million
- Box office: $80.4 million

Halloween is a 2007 American slasher film produced, written, and directed by Rob Zombie. It is a remake of John Carpenter's 1978 film, and the ninth installment in the Halloween franchise. Starring Malcolm McDowell, Sheri Moon Zombie, Tyler Mane, Scout Taylor-Compton, Brad Dourif, Danielle Harris, and William Forsythe, the film follows Michael Myers, who murdered several people as a ten-year-old child and was incarcerated at Smith's Grove Sanitarium, before breaking out and stalking Laurie Strode and her friends on Halloween night seventeen years later.

Working from Carpenter's advice to "make [the film] his own", Zombie chose to develop the film as both an origin story and a remake, allowing for more original content than simply re-filming the same scenes.

Halloween was theatrically released in the United States by Metro-Goldwyn-Mayer on August 31, 2007, with The Weinstein Company releasing in other territories, to generally negative reviews from critics. Despite this, the film was a box office success, grossing $80 million worldwide against its $15 million production budget. A sequel, Halloween II, was released in 2009.

== Plot ==
On Halloween 1990 in Haddonfield, Illinois, having already exhibited signs of psychopathic tendencies, ten-year-old Michael Myers murders his school bully Wesley Rhoades, his abusive stepfather Ronnie White, his promiscuous older sister Judith and her boyfriend Steven "Steve" Haley, only sparing his baby sister, whom he calls "Boo". After one of the longest trials in the state's history, Michael is found guilty of first-degree murder and sentenced to Smith's Grove Sanitarium under the care of child psychologist Dr. Samuel Loomis.

Michael initially cooperates with Loomis and his mother Deborah, whom he loves dearly, as she visits him regularly. Over the following few months, Michael starts dissociating and fixates on his papier-mâché masks, withdrawing from the people around him, even his mother. When Michael ends up killing a nurse as Deborah is leaving from one of her visits, she is unable to handle the situation and commits suicide.

For the next fifteen years, Michael continues making his masks and not speaking to people. Loomis, having continued to treat Michael over the years, attempts to move forward with his life and closes Michael's case. Later, Michael escapes from Smith's Grove, killing the guards and facility staff in the process. He then kills a truck driver, takes his coveralls and makes his way back to Haddonfield. On Halloween day, Michael then arrives at his now-abandoned childhood home, recovering the kitchen knife and Halloween mask he stored underneath the floorboards the night he murdered his family.

Meanwhile, teenage Laurie Strode and her friends Annie Brackett and Lynda Van Der Klok prepare for Halloween. Throughout the day, Laurie witnesses Michael watching her from a distance. Later that night, Lynda meets up with her boyfriend Bob Simms at Michael's abandoned home. Michael appears and then strangles Lynda after stabbing Bob. As Laurie is babysitting Tommy Doyle, Michael murders her parents, Mason and Cynthia. Dr. Loomis, having been informed about Michael's escape, drives to Haddonfield in search for him. After obtaining a handgun, Loomis warns Sheriff Leigh Brackett, who rushes over to the Strode home. While on the way, he explains to Loomis that Laurie is actually Michael's baby sister, having been adopted by the Strodes after their late mother's suicide.

After convincing Laurie to babysit Lindsey Wallace while spending time with her boyfriend Paul, Annie is attacked by Michael after he kills Paul at the Wallace residence. Bringing Lindsey home, Laurie finds Annie badly injured on the floor but still alive and calls for help. Michael attacks Laurie, chasing her down the street and back to the Doyle residence. Loomis and Brackett hear the call over the radio and head toward the scene. While the kids hide in the bathroom, Michael kidnaps Laurie and takes her back to their old home. He tries to show Laurie that she is his sister and presents a photo of the two of them together. Unable to understand, Laurie stabs Michael in the neck before escaping the house. Michael chases after her, but Loomis arrives and shoots him three times.

Recovering, Michael recaptures Laurie and heads back to the house. Loomis intervenes, but Michael subdues him by crushing his skull. Laurie takes the gun and runs upstairs where she hides inside of the walls. Michael corners her on a balcony and charges at her head-on, knocking them both over the side of the railing. Laurie awakens over an unconscious Michael and points the gun at his face, with Michael grabbing hold of her wrist just as the gun goes off. Laurie drops the gun and starts screaming maniacally as police sirens are heard in the distance.

== Cast ==
- Malcolm McDowell as Dr. Samuel Loomis
- Sheri Moon Zombie as Deborah Myers
- Tyler Mane as Michael Myers
  - Daeg Faerch as Michael Myers (age 10)
- Scout Taylor-Compton as Laurie Strode / Angel Myers
  - Sydnie and Myla Pitzer, Lela Altman as Angel "Baby Boo" Myers
- Brad Dourif as Sheriff Leigh Brackett
- Danielle Harris as Annie Brackett
- Hanna Hall as Judith Myers
- William Forsythe as Ronnie White
- Kristina Klebe as Lynda Van Der Klok
- Danny Trejo as Ismael Cruz
- Ken Foree as Joe "Big Joe" Grizzly
- Udo Kier as Morgan Walker
- Sid Haig as Chester Chesterfield
- Daryl Sabara as Wesley Rhoades
- Daniel Roebuck as Lou Martini
- Richard Lynch as Principal Chambers
- Bill Moseley as Zach "Z-Man" Garrett
- Clint Howard as Dr. Koplensen
- Lew Temple as Noel Kluggs
- Tom Towles as Larry Redgrave / Councilman Edwards (scenes deleted and re-shot)
- Leslie Easterbrook as Patty Frost
- Steve Boyles as Stan Payne
- Skyler Gisondo as Tommy Doyle
- Jenny Gregg Stewart as Lindsey Wallace
- Adam Weisman as Steve Haley
- Dee Wallace as Cynthia Strode
- Max Van Ville as Paul
- Nick Mennell as Bob Simms
- Pat Skipper as Mason Strode
- Richmond Arquette as Deputy Charles
- Paul Kampf as Officer Lowery
- Sybil Danning as Nurse Wynn
- Micky Dolenz as Derek Allen
- Mel Fair as Taylor Madison
- Adrienne Barbeau as Adoption Agency Secretary

== Production ==
After the release of Halloween: Resurrection (2002), there were various ideas on how to proceed with a ninth installment. After the release of Freddy vs. Jason in 2003, Dimension Films attempted to produce a crossover with the Hellraiser franchise featuring Pinhead and the Cenobites. One of the pitches involved a young Michael Myers opening the Lament Configuration and being possessed with Samhain fleeing from Hell, providing the source of his murderousness and invincibility; the remainder of the film would have involved the Cenobites pursuing him. An earlier pitch from the late 90s from Dave Parker was rejected by Dimension, as they believed Freddy vs. Jason would bomb at the box office. According to Doug Bradley, Clive Barker agreed to write a script while John Carpenter was being considered to direct. Bradley said that Barker "wasn't interested in a mano-a-mano confrontation. He was interested in finding the places where the Hellraiser and Halloween landscapes might have crossed over" and that he envisioned Michael Myers as "a sadomasochistic sexual pervert and serial killer which would be enough to pique Pinhead's interest." The project was ultimately cancelled after 52 percent of respondents to an online poll disapproved of the project and Moustapha Akkad was not interested.

Akkad continued to try to develop a sequel. Josh Stolberg, who also unsuccessfully proposed a Hellraiser crossover with Bobby Florsheim, pitched Halloween: Bad Blood, which would have brought back Jamie Lloyd. A 2004 script from screenwriting duo Jim Keeble and Dudi Appleton, titled Halloween: Retribution, would have begun with Michael killing Busta Rhymes's character Freddie Harris and involved Laurie Strode's son John Tate and Sheriff Leigh Brackett plotting to kill Michael Myers in revenge for her death in the previous film; the film would have ended with Tate drowning Michael in a frozen lake but implying that he would take his place as a murderous killer. Also in 2004, a script from Matt Veene, entitled Halloween: Asylum, had Michael Myers breaking free from death row. Another prospective screenplay written by Jake Wade Wall was Halloween: The Missing Years, which would have been a prequel centered around Michael Myers returning to Smith's Grove Sanitarium in the early 1980s during the events of Halloween III: Season of the Witch (1982), with flashbacks revealing details about his childhood at the asylum after murdering his sister in the 1960s. At the same time Moustapha Akkad and his son Malek were working on a story revolving around Dr. Wynn from Halloween: The Curse of Michael Myers (1995). Development on a direct sequel suddenly halted when Moustapha Akkad was killed in the 2005 Amman hotel bombings while attending a wedding in Jordan, and his son Malek decided to take the series in a different direction.

On June 4, 2006, Dimension Films announced that Rob Zombie would be creating the next installment in the Halloween film series, which was to be a remake of the original film. The plan was for Zombie to hold many positions in the production; he would write, direct, produce, and serve as music supervisor. Bob Weinstein approached him about making the film. Zombie, who was a fan of the original Halloween, jumped at the chance to make a Halloween film for Dimension Studios. Before Dimension went public with the news, Zombie felt obligated to inform Carpenter, out of respect, of the plans to remake his film. Carpenter's request was for Zombie to "make it his own". During a June 16, 2006, interview, Zombie announced that his film would combine the elements of prequel and remake with the original concept, and insisted that there would be considerable original content in the new film as opposed to mere rehashed material. The BBC reported that the new film would disregard the numerous sequels that followed Halloween.

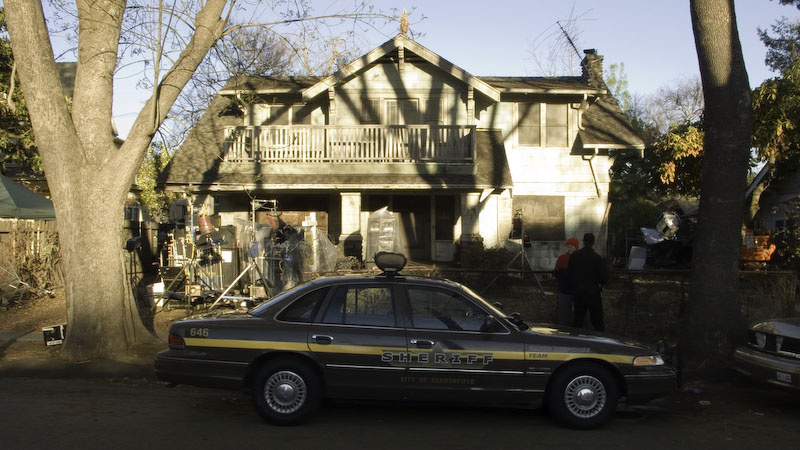
The Myers house film location early March 2007 on Glendon Way in South Pasadena, California.

Zombie's intention was to reinvent Michael Myers because he felt the character, along with Freddy Krueger, Jason Voorhees, and Pinhead, had become more familiar to audiences, and as a result, less scary. The idea behind the new film was to delve deeper into Michael's backstory and add "new life" to the character. Michael's mask would be given its own story to provide an explanation as to why he wears it, instead of having the character simply steal a random mask from a hardware store as in the original film. Zombie explained that he wanted Michael to be true to what a psychopath really is, and wanted the mask to be a way for Michael to hide. He also wanted the young Michael to have charisma, which would be projected onto the adult Michael. In addition, he decided that Michael's motives for returning to Haddonfield would be more ambiguous, explaining, "[W]as he trying to kill Laurie, or just find her because he loves her?" Michael speaks as a child during the beginning of the film, but while in Smith's Grove he stops talking completely. Zombie originally planned to have the adult Michael speak to Laurie in the film's finale, simply saying his childhood nickname for her, "Boo". Zombie explained that this version was not used because he was afraid having the character talk at that point would demystify him too much, and because the act of Michael handing Laurie the photograph of them together was enough.

Moreover, Michael would not be able to drive in the new film, unlike his 1978 counterpart who stole Loomis' car so that he could drive back to Haddonfield. The Dr. Loomis character was also to be more intertwined with that of Michael; Zombie reasoned that the character's role in the original was "showing up merely to say something dramatic". Although Zombie added more history to the Michael Myers character, hence creating more original content for the film, he chose to keep the character's trademark mask and Carpenter's theme intact for his version (despite an apparent misinterpretation in an interview suggesting the theme would be ditched). Production officially began on January 29, 2007. Shortly before production began, Zombie reported that he had seen the first production of Michael's signature mask and commented, "It looks perfect, exactly like the original. Not since 1978 has The Shape looked so good". Filming occurred in the same neighborhood that Carpenter used for the original Halloween.

On December 19, 2006, Zombie announced to Bloody Disgusting that Daeg Faerch would play the part of ten-year-old Michael Myers. On December 22, 2006, Malcolm McDowell was officially announced to be playing Dr. Loomis. McDowell stated that he wanted a tremendous ego in Loomis, who is out to get a new book from the ordeal. On December 24, 2006, Zombie announced that Tyler Mane, who had previously worked with Zombie on The Devil's Rejects (2005), would portray the adult Michael Myers. Mane stated that it was very difficult to act only with his eyes. After winning the role, he noted that he consecutively watched seven of the eight Halloween films (excluding the third because Michael Myers does not appear) to better understand his character. Scout Taylor-Compton endured a long audition process, but as director Zombie explains, "Scout was my first choice. There was just something about her; she had a genuine quality. She didn't seem actor-y." She was one of the final people to be cast for a lead role after Faerch, Mane, McDowell, Forsythe, and Harris. Heather Bowen, a fan who won a contest for a walk-on cameo appearance in 2005 when it was still intended to be a sequel, played a news reporter who covered Michael's arrest, but her scene was cut from the film and does not appear in the deleted scenes. In the film's original ending, Loomis is successful in convincing Michael to let go of Laurie as he is surrounded by police officers, telling Michael he "did the right thing". Despite Loomis' protests, however, Michael is killed shortly afterwards in a hail of gunfire, and the film ends with Loomis looking down sadly at his former patient's corpse.

== Release ==
Approximately four days before the theatrical release of the film, a workprint version of Halloween appeared online and was circulated around various BitTorrent sites. Upon hearing of the leaked copy, Zombie stated that whatever version had been leaked was an older version of the film, unlike what was about to be released in theaters. The leak of Zombie's workprint led to speculation that the film's box office success could be damaged, as director Eli Roth attributed the financial failure of his film that released earlier the same year, Hostel: Part II, to the leaking of a workprint version. Dark Horizons webmaster Garth Franklin noted that watching the workprint allows a viewer to see what was changed after test screenings of the film in June 2007. For example, one particular scene—the rape of one of the Smith's Grove female inmates—was replaced in the final version. Halloween was officially released on August 31, 2007, to 3,472 theaters in North America, giving it the widest release of any of the previous Halloween films.

== Reception ==
=== Box office ===
On its opening day, Halloween grossed $10,896,610, and immediately surpassed the opening weekend grosses for Halloween II (1981) at $7,446,508, Season of the Witch at $6,333,259, The Return of Michael Myers (1988) at $6,831,250, The Revenge of Michael Myers (1989) at $5,093,428, and The Curse of Michael Myers at $7,308,529. From September 1–2, Halloween earned $8,554,661 and $6,911,096, respectively, for a 3-day opening weekend total of $26,362,367. The film would earn an additional $4,229,392 on Labor Day for a 4-day holiday weekend gross of $30,591,759, making it the highest ever for that holiday. As a result, the 2007 film would immediately surpass the total box office gross for Halloween II (1981) at $25,533,818, Halloween III (1982) at $14,400,000, Halloween 4 (1988) at $17,768,757, Halloween 5 (1989) at $11,642,254, The Curse of Michael Myers (1995) at $15,116,634, and Halloween: Resurrection with $30,354,442.

Following its first Friday after its opening weekend, Halloween saw a 71.6% drop in attendance, earning $3,093,679. The film, which earned the #1 spot at the box office in its opening weekend, earned only $9,513,770 in its second weekend—a 63.9% decrease—but still claimed the #2 spot at the box office just behind 3:10 to Yuma. The film continued to appear in the weekend top ten going into its third weekend, when it earned $4,867,522 to take sixth place. It was not until the film's fourth weekend that it fell out of the top ten and into twelfth place with $2,189,266. Halloween would fail to regain a top ten spot at the box office for the remainder of its theatrical run.

Thanks to its opening weekend of $30.5 million, the film broke the box-office record for the Labor Day weekend, surpassing the record set in 2005 by Transporter 2 with $20.1 million. It remained the top Labor Day weekend grosser until the release of Shang-Chi and the Legend of the Ten Rings in 2021. Halloween was also the 8th highest-grossing R-rated film of 2007, and finished out the year in 44th place for domestic box office gross. With its $58 million box office gross, Halloween was the second highest-grossing film among the recent slasher remakes, taken over by A Nightmare on Elm Street (2010) with $63 million. However, it is third in the list which consists of When a Stranger Calls (2006) at $47.8 million, Black Christmas (2006) at $16.3 million, Prom Night (2008) at $43.8 million, My Bloody Valentine 3D (2009) with $51.4 million, and Friday the 13th (2009) leading the group with $60 million. Halloween is also ranked eleventh overall when comparing it to all of the horror remakes, as well as eighth place for all slasher films in general, in unadjusted dollars.

In addition to the film's North American box office, it opened alongside Michael Clayton and Mr. Woodcock in foreign markets on the weekend of September 29, 2007. Halloween led the trio with a total of $1.3 million in 372 theaters – Michael Clayton and Mr. Woodcock took in $1.2 million from 295 screens and $1 million from 238 screens, respectively. By November 1, 2007, Halloween had taken in an additional $7 million in foreign markets. Ultimately, the film would earn approximately $21,981,879 overseas. By the end of the film's theatrical run, the film had taken a worldwide total of $80,253,908. When adjusting for the 2018 inflation, Zombie's Halloween—which adjusts to $77.4 million domestically—is sixth, behind Carpenter's Halloween at $183.6 million, Halloween (2018) at $155.7 million, Halloween H20: 20 Years Later at $107.3 million, and Halloween II at $84 million.

=== Critical response ===
Based on 122 reviews collected by Rotten Tomatoes, Halloween received a 28% approval rating, with an average rating of 4.40/10. The consensus reads, "Rob Zombie doesn't bring many new ideas to the table in Halloween, making it another bloody disappointment for fans of the franchise." By comparison, Metacritic, which assigns a weighted average score out of 100 to reviews from mainstream critics, calculated a 47 out of 100 from the 18 reviews, indicating "mixed or average" reviews. CinemaScore polls reported that the average grade cinemagoers gave the film was "B−" on an A+ to F scale; it also reported that 62% of the audience was male, with 57% being 25 years or older.

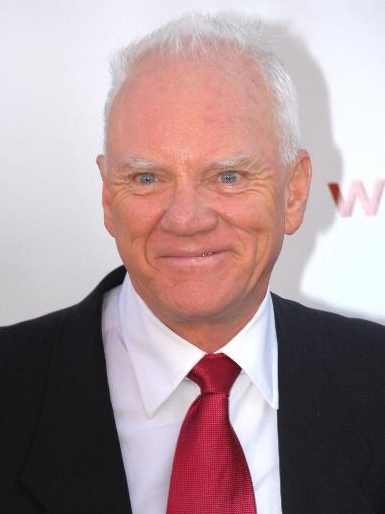
Various critics thought that Malcolm McDowell was perfectly cast as Loomis.

Peter Hartlaub, of the San Francisco Chronicle, felt Zombie was successful in both "[putting] his own spin on Halloween, while at the same time paying tribute to Carpenter's film"; he thought Zombie managed to make Michael Myers almost "sympathetic" as a child, but that the last third of the film felt more like a montage of scenes with Halloween slipping into "slasher-film logic". Nathan Lee of The Village Voice disagreed in part with Hartlaub, feeling that Halloween may have placed too much emphasis on providing sympathy for Michael Myers, but that it succeeded in "[deepening] Carpenter's vision without rooting out its fear". The film critic Matthew Turner believed the first half of the film, which featured the prequel elements of Michael as a child, were better played than the remake elements of the second half. In short, Turner stated that performances from the cast were "superb", with Malcolm McDowell being perfectly cast as Dr. Loomis, but that the film lacked the scare value of Carpenter's original. Jamie Russell from BBC News agreed that the first half of the film worked better than the last half; she stated that Zombie's expanded backstory on Michael was "surprisingly effective"—also agreeing that McDowell was perfectly cast as Loomis—but that Zombie failed to deliver the "supernatural dread" that Carpenter created for Michael in his 1978 original.

New York Daily News critic Jack Matthews believed the film lacked tension, and went more for cheap shocks—focusing more on enhancing the "imagery of violence"—than real attempts to scare the audience; he gave the film one and a half stars out of five. Dennis Harvey, from Variety magazine, echoed Matthew's opinion that the film failed to deliver on the suspense; he also felt that you could not tell one teenage character from the next, whereas in Carpenter's original, each teenager had real personalities. Writing eleven years after the film's release for The Washington Post, Sonny Bunch speculated that "The blowback theory of Michael Myers may have been comforting for a post-9/11 America mired in the Iraq War trying to get a sense of how evil comes to be, but it's deeply dissatisfying as the peg on which to hang a slasher movie villain." In contrast, Rossiter Drake of The Examiner applauded Michael's backstory, feeling that it was a "compelling take on the mythology" that managed to be "unique" and "shocking" at the same time. In agreement with other critics, Empire magazine's Kim Newman felt that, because Zombie seemed less focused on the teenagers being stalked and killed by Michael, the film "[fell] flat" when it came to delivering suspense or anything "remotely scary", though Newman did praise McDowell for his portrayal of the "dogged psychiatrist". Ben Walter, of Time Out London, felt Zombie added "surprising realism" to the development of Michael Myers' psychopathic actions, but agreed with Newman that the director replaced the original film's "suspense and playfulness" with a convincing display of "black-blooded brutality".

Frank Scheck, of The Hollywood Reporter, believed that even though Zombie's remake of Carpenter's Halloween was better than getting another sequel in the long running franchise, it still was not comparable to the 1978 original. For Scheck, Zombie replaced Carpenter's building suspense, which made it so "brilliant", with graphic violence and extended scenes of nudity; he also criticized McDowell for lacking the intensity that Donald Pleasence brought to the Loomis character. By contrast, TV Guide's Ken Fox felt that Zombie did deliver a "scary horror movie", not by copying Carpenter, but by making the film his own. Fox noted that Zombie seemed to follow more in the footsteps of Wes Craven and Tobe Hooper's "savage, greasy-haired '70s" films, which allowed him to bring Michael back to his roots and successfully terrify an audience which has grown accustomed to the recent "torture porn" horror films. Bill Gibron of PopMatters believes that audiences and critics cannot compare Carpenter's film to Zombie's remake; where Carpenter focused more on the citizens of Haddonfield—with Michael acting as a true "boogeyman"—Zombie focuses more on Michael himself, successfully forcing the audience to experience all of the elements that Michael went through that would result in his "desire for death".

Quentin Tarantino claims to have disliked the film when first viewing it in the theater, but grew to appreciate it for Harris and Faerch's performances and Zombie's "Sam Peckinpah aesthetic."

Halloween won the Rondo Hatton Classic Horror Award for Best Film of 2007, drawing in 550 votes, the most ever in the history of the award. The film also won the 'Best Remake Award' at the 2008 Spike TV Scream Awards. Dan Mathews, vice president of PETA, sent Rob Zombie a thank-you letter for what he perceived as Zombie sending a message to audiences when he depicted the young Michael Myers torturing animals, something he felt demonstrated that people who commit acts of cruelty to animals are likely to move on to humans. Mathews went on to say, "Hopefully, with the attention focused by your movie on the link between cruelty to animals and human violence, more people will recognize the warning signs among people they know and deal with them more forcefully. We wish you continued success!"

Carpenter himself was ambivalent about the film; during an audience Q&A in 2016, Carpenter stated that he took issue with Zombie's comments that he was "cold" when they discussed the project and noted that it will color his perception of the film and lamented that giving Myers a backstory took away from the mystique. He later clarified that he is on good terms with Zombie. Carpenter, serving as an executive producer and creative consultant for the 2018 sequel to Halloween (1978), expressed his disagreement with Zombie's portrayal of Myers, "I thought that he took away the mystique of the story by explaining too much about [Michael Myers]. I don't care about that. He's supposed to be a force of nature. He's supposed to be almost supernatural."

=== Awards and nominations ===
The film was nominated for multiple awards for best film and acting. Halloween was nominated by the Sitges Film Festival for "Best Film", as did the Rondo Hatton Classic Horror Awards, for which it won. Sheri Moon Zombie was also nominated for Best Supporting Actress at the Fright Meter Awards.

== Soundtrack ==
The film's soundtrack was released on August 21, 2007; it includes 24 tracks, consisting of 12 dialogue tracks and 12 instrumentals. The album contained both new tracks, as well as ones recycled from the original Halloween and its sequel. Tyler Bates' interpretation of John Carpenter's original Halloween theme is the first musical track, with "(Don't Fear) The Reaper," which appeared in the original Halloween, and "Mr. Sandman", which appeared in Halloween II and Halloween H20: 20 Years Later, performed by Nan Vernon. Writing about its selection from the 1981 film, one reviewer for the BBC commented that it worked well to "mimic Laurie's situation (sleeping a lot)", making "the once innocent sounding lyrics seem threatening in a horror film". The album also includes Kiss's "God of Thunder", Rush's "Tom Sawyer", Alice Cooper's "Only Women Bleed", Peter Frampton's "Baby, I Love Your Way", Nazareth's "Love Hurts", Bachman–Turner Overdrive's "Let It Ride", Misfits' "Halloween II", and an Iggy Pop live version of The Stooges' "1969" among others.

== Home media ==
On December 18, 2007, the film was released on DVD in the United States; both the theatrical (110 minutes) and an unrated director's cut (121 minutes) were released as two-disc special editions containing identical bonus features. The film was released on DVD in the UK on April 28, 2008, known as the "Uncut" edition. On October 7, 2008, a three-disc set was released. This Collector's Edition of Halloween features the same bonus features as the previous unrated edition, but includes Zombie's four-and-a-half-hour "making-of" documentary similar to the "30 Days in Hell" documentary for Zombie's The Devil's Rejects.

== See also ==
- List of films set around Halloween
