= Halloween II (2009 film) =

Film by Rob Zombie

- Theatrical release poster
- Directed by: Rob Zombie
- Written by: Rob Zombie
- Based on: Characters by: John Carpenter; Debra Hill
- Produced by: Malek Akkad; Andy Gould; Rob Zombie
- Starring: Malcolm McDowell; Tyler Mane; Sheri Moon Zombie; Brad Dourif; Danielle Harris; Scout Taylor-Compton
- Cinematography: Brandon Trost
- Edited by: Glenn Garland
- Music by: Tyler Bates
- Production companies: Dimension Films; Trancas International Films; Spectacle Entertainment Group
- Distributed by: Dimension Films (through The Weinstein Company)
- Release date: August 28, 2009 (United States)
- Running time: 105 minutes
- Country: United States
- Language: English
- Budget: $15 million
- Box office: $39.4 million

Halloween II (also known as simply H2) is a 2009 American slasher film produced, written, and directed by Rob Zombie. It is the 10th installment in the Halloween film series and the sequel to Zombie's 2007 remake of Halloween (1978), though it is not a remake of the 1981 sequel of the same name. Starring Malcolm McDowell, Tyler Mane, Sheri Moon Zombie, Brad Dourif, Danielle Harris, and Scout Taylor-Compton, the film follows Laurie Strode as she deals with the aftermath of the Haddonfield murders and her deteriorating relationship with fellow survivor Annie Brackett, Dr. Loomis trying to capitalize on those events with a new book, and Michael Myers as he seeks to reunite with his sister on Halloween once more.

For Halloween II, Zombie decided to focus more on the connection between Strode and Myers, and the idea that they share similar psychological problems. He wanted the sequel to be more realistic and more violent than the previous film and to portray how the events of the first film affected the characters. Zombie also wanted to provide a glimpse into each character's psyche. Principal photography took place in Covington, Georgia, which provided Zombie with the visual style for which he was looking. Zombie had trouble finding a place to include John Carpenter's original Halloween theme music, and it was only included in the final shot.

Halloween II was the last film in the series made by Dimension Films before it lost the rights to the franchise in 2015. The film was released on August 28, 2009, to negative reviews from critics. On October 30, it was re-released in North America to coincide with the Halloween holiday weekend. The film did not do as well as the previous installment, grossing $40 million against its $15 million budget. Zombie declined to return to film a further sequel, Halloween 3D, which was cancelled in 2012. The next installment of the franchise was a sequel to the original film, which was released in 2018.

== Plot ==
In a flashback during his time at Smith's Grove Sanitarium, a young Michael Myers is visited by his mother Deborah, who gives him a white toy horse as a gift.

Fifteen years later, Laurie Strode is wandering around the town of Haddonfield in shock after having shot Michael. (Note: As depicted in Halloween (2007)) Sheriff Lee Brackett finds Laurie and rushes her to the hospital. Meanwhile, paramedics pick up Annie Brackett and Michael's old psychiatrist Dr. Sam Loomis, who survived the attack. Michael's body is transported by another ambulance, but he mysteriously awakens and kills the paramedic after a traffic collision. Michael then appears at the hospital, murdering several nurses and a security guard to find Laurie, who escapes the facility. Michael chases her down and stabs her, and Laurie wakes up; the hospital sequence was a dream.

In the year since Michael's killing spree, Laurie is living with the Bracketts, and Michael is missing and presumed dead. While Laurie deals with her trauma in therapy, Dr. Loomis has turned the event into an opportunity to profit off another book. Meanwhile, Michael, who is still alive and living as a drifter, is having visions of his mother's ghost, instructing him to reunite with Laurie. Michael arrives at a farm, killing the owners and their dog before heading to Haddonfield, as Laurie is starting to have hallucinations. Meanwhile, Loomis goes on tour to promote his new book, only to be criticized by the public, who blame him for the actions of Michael and for exploiting the deaths of the victims.

When Loomis' book is released, Laurie discovers that she is actually Angel Myers, Michael's long-lost baby sister. She goes to a Halloween party with her co-workers, Mya and Harley, to escape how she is feeling. Michael appears at the party and kills Harley, then goes to the Brackett home, where he fatally wounds Annie. As Laurie and Mya return to the house, they find the bloody Annie, who dies in Laurie's arms. Michael then kills Mya and comes after Laurie, who manages quickly to escape. Sheriff Brackett arrives home and finds his daughter dead. Laurie flags down a car, but Michael kills the driver and flips the vehicle over with Laurie still inside. Michael then takes the unconscious Laurie to an abandoned shack, where she is awakened by visions of the Myers' mother, seen by both Michael and her.

The police discover Michael's location and surround the shack. Loomis arrives and goes inside to try to reason with Michael, but when he tries to save Laurie, Michael stabs him to death before being shot through the shack window by Brackett and tripping over, being impaled on farming equipment. Apparently released from her visions, Laurie walks over to Michael and stabs him with his own knife, to such a degree Myers dies almost instantly. The shack door opens and Laurie walks out wearing Michael's torn mask. Later on, Laurie sits in isolation in a psychiatric ward and grins as her mother's ghost approaches with the white horse.

== Cast ==
- Scout Taylor-Compton as Laurie Strode
- Malcolm McDowell as Dr. Samuel Loomis
- Tyler Mane as Michael Myers
  - Chase Wright Vanek as young Michael Myers
- Sheri Moon Zombie as Deborah Myers
- Brad Dourif as Sheriff Lee Brackett
- Danielle Harris as Annie Brackett
- Brea Grant as Mya Rockwell
- Howard Hesseman as Uncle Meat
- Angela Trimbur as Harley David
- Mary Birdsong as Nancy McDonald
- Daniel Roebuck as Big Lou
- Bill Fagerbakke as Deputy Webb
- Richard Brake as Gary Scott
- Dayton Callie as Coroner Hooks
- Margot Kidder as Barbara Collier
- Richard Riehle as Buddy, the Night Watchman
- Mark Christopher Lawrence as Deputy Fred King
- Jeff Daniel Phillips as Howard Boggs / Seymour Coffins
- Meagen Fay as Deputy Lyons
- Caroline Williams as Dr. Maple
- Sylvia Jefferies as Misty Dawn
- Mark Boone Junior as Floyd
- Duane Whitaker as Sherman
- Octavia Spencer as Nurse Daniels
- Silas Weir Mitchell as Chett, the Bringer of Death
- Robert Curtis Brown as Kyle Van Der Klok
- Chris Hardwick as David Newman
- Nicky Whelan as Wendy Snow
- Betsy Rue as Jazlean Benny
- "Weird Al" Yankovic as himself
- Sean Whalen as Becks

== Production ==
=== Development ===
Don't feel hindered by any of the rules we've had in the past. I want this to be your vision and I want you to express that vision.

— Producer Malek Akkad speaking to writer/director Rob Zombie

In 2008, at the 30 Years of Terror Convention, Halloween franchise producer Malek Akkad confirmed that a sequel to Rob Zombie's Halloween (2007), a remake of John Carpenter's 1978 film, was in the works. Despite Julien Maury and Alexandre Bustillo being in negotiations to direct the sequel in November 2008, Zombie reprised as both director, writer, and producer.

In an interview, Zombie expressed how the exhaustion of creating the predecessor made him not want to come back for a sequel, but after a year of cooling down, he was more open to the idea. He explained that with the sequel he was no longer bound by a sense of needing to retain any "John Carpenter-ness", as he "felt free to do whatever". Akkad said the original intention, when they believed Zombie was not returning, was to create a "normal sequel". Akkad and his Trancas International Films producing company hired various writers to come up with drafts for a new film, but none worked. Akkad, and Harvey and Bob Weinstein then turned to Bustillo and Muary, whose film Inside (2007) had been bought for distribution by the Weinstein Company. According to Akkad, the producers really wanted Zombie to return, as Akkad felt that there was something "lost in the translation" when the duo took over the project. After his work on the 2007 remake, Zombie had earned the trust of Akkad, who told him to ignore any rules they had set for him on the previous film. Akkad said that he wanted Zombie to move the franchise away from some of its established rules.

=== Characters ===
For the sequel, Tyler Mane, Malcolm McDowell, Scout Taylor-Compton, Danielle Harris, Sheri Moon Zombie, and Brad Dourif returned to the roles of Michael Myers, Samuel Loomis, Laurie Strode, Annie Brackett, Deborah Myers, and Sheriff Brackett, respectively. Although Daeg Faerch, who portrayed a young Michael Myers in the 2007 remake, was initially signed on to reprise his role for Halloween II (then known as H2), after filming briefly in Georgia as young Michael, he was later recast because he had grown taller. He was replaced by Chase Wright Vanek. Zombie had to recast the role, much to his own dismay, because Faerch's physical maturity did not fit what was in the script. Although Faerch is not in the sequel, the first trailer for Halloween II contained images of Faerch. Zombie pointed out that those images were test shots done and were not intended to be in either the trailer or the film.

As Laurie is Michael's sister, I'm playing it like he's clearly insane and so is she, but her insanity doesn't manifest itself in the same way... She's slipping into insanity throughout the whole movie.

— Zombie describing Laurie's psychological state.

Taylor-Compton described her character as having "these bipolar moments", where her emotions are spontaneously changing from points of happiness to agitation. The actress stated that Zombie wanted to see Laurie Strode travel into "these really dark places". Taylor-Compton clarified that when the film starts Laurie is still not aware that Michael is her older brother, and as the film progresses more and more pieces of information are given to her and she does not know how to deal with them. The actress explained that the darkness brewing inside Laurie is manifested externally, generally through her physical appearance and the clothes she chooses to wear—Zombie characterized the look as "grungy".

Instead of focusing on Michael, Zombie chose to look more at the psychological consequences on Laurie after the events of the remake. As Zombie explains, after Michael murdered her friends and family, Laurie became a "wreck", who continually sinks lower as the film moves forward. Even Sheriff Brackett goes through changes. Brackett, who receives more screen time in this film, allows Laurie to move in with him and his daughter after the events of the first film. Zombie explained, "He's old, he's worn out, he's just this beat-down guy with these two girls he can't deal with." Zombie characterized Loomis in the sequel as more of a "sellout", who exploits the memories of those who were killed by Michael in the 2007 film. Zombie explained that he tried to channel Vincent Bugliosi, a lawyer who prosecuted Charles Manson and then wrote a book about it, into Loomis's character for the sequel, noting that he wanted Loomis to seem more "ridiculous" this time. As for Michael Myers, the character is given almost an entirely new look for the film, which is being used, according to Taylor-Compton, to illustrate a new emotion for the character as he spends much of his time trying to hide himself. Zombie said that of all of the characters that return in the sequel, Michael is the only one that does not change: "All the other characters are very different. Laurie; Loomis; they're having all kinds of problems in their life, but Michael just moves along. Michael is no different; he's exactly the same as he was ten years old and he killed everybody [...] He has no concept of the world around him, so he can never be affected by it."

=== Filming ===
With a $15 million budget, production began on February 23, 2009, in Atlanta, Georgia. Zombie acknowledged that filming in Georgia provided certain tax breaks for the company, but the real reason he chose that location was because the other locations he was planning to use were still experiencing snowy weather. For him, Georgia's landscapes and locations provided the look that he wanted for his film. During production, Zombie described the sequel as being "Ultra gritty, ultra intense and very real" and said that he was trying to create almost the exact opposite of what people would expect. Known for filming multiple sequences during production of his films, Zombie filmed an alternate ending to Halloween II. In the alternate ending, Loomis and Michael crash through the shed the police have surrounded, and out into the open air. As Loomis grasps at Michael's mask, and pleads for him to stop, Michael stabs him in the stomach, telling him to "Die!". With Loomis injured and unconscious (it is not revealed whether he lived or died), the police open fire on Michael, killing him. Laurie, now completely insane, leaves the shack, picks up Michael's knife and walks over to Loomis' unconscious body. Against Brackett's orders, the police open fire on Laurie, apparently killing her too.

=== Music ===
For the sequel, Zombie only used Carpenter's original theme music in the final scene of the film, though the director admits that he and music composer Tyler Bates tried to find other places to include it. According to Zombie, Carpenter's music did not fit with what was happening in the film; whenever he or Bates would insert it into a scene it "just wouldn't feel right" to the director. Zombie also used popular culture songs throughout the film, with "Nights in White Satin" appearing the most prominently. Zombie chose songs that he liked, and that would enhance a given scene within the film. An official soundtrack for the film was released on August 25, 2009. In addition, an album featuring the music of psychobilly band Captain Clegg and the Night Creatures was released in conjunction with Halloween II on August 28, 2009. Captain Clegg and the Night Creatures is a fictional band that appears in Halloween II. Nan Vernon, who recorded a new version of the song "Mr. Sandman" for the end credits of the 2007 remake, recorded a cover of "Love Hurts" for Halloween II.

== Release ==
The Weinstein Company, under their Dimension Films banner, released Halloween II in North America on August 28, 2009, to 3,025 theaters. Following that, the film was released in the United Kingdom on October 9, 2009. Dimension re-released Halloween II in North America on October 30, 2009, to coincide with the Halloween holiday, across 1,083 theaters. The film was released on DVD and Blu-ray on January 12, 2010; the theatrical cut and an unrated director's cut, which Zombie says is "very different from the theatrical version," are available. The Theatrical cut can only be purchased on Blu-ray in a Canadian double feature disc along with the theatrical cut of Halloween (2007).

=== Box office ===
On its opening day, the film grossed an estimated $7,640,000, which is less than the $10,896,610 Zombie's 2007 remake pulled in during the same weekend of August. By the end of its opening weekend, Halloween II had grossed $16,349,565. That weekend earned more than the entire box office performances of Halloween III: Season of the Witch ($14,400,000), Halloween 5: The Revenge of Michael Myers ($11,642,254), and Halloween: The Curse of Michael Myers ($15,116,634), in unadjusted dollars. The film dropped 64.9% in its second weekend, only grossing $5,745,206 and slipping from third to sixth place. Grossing just $2,114,486 in its third weekend, Halloween II dropped out of the box office top ten to fourteenth place. The re-release of the film was intended to take advantage of the Halloween holiday, but the film only brought in approximately $475,000. By the end of its theatrical run, Halloween II grossed a total of $33,392,973 in North America, and an additional $6,028,494 overseas for a worldwide total of $39,421,467. Compared to the other Halloween films, the 2009 sequel sits in fourth place, just behind the original Halloween.

=== Critical reception ===
Based on 85 reviews collected by Rotten Tomatoes, Halloween II has an overall 25% approval rating from critics, with an average score of 4.60/10. The consensus reads, "Zombie shows flashes of vision in the follow-up to his Halloween reboot, but they're smothered by mountains of gore and hackneyed, brutal violence." Metacritic, which uses a weighted average, assigned the film a score of 35 out of 100, based on 17 critics, indicating "generally unfavorable" reviews.

Rob Nelson, of Variety, felt the use of Deborah and the white horse was nothing more than "silly", and he disagreed with Zombie's choice to film Halloween II in 16mm film, as opposed to the wider format of 35mm that he used on his 2007 remake. Nelson also stated that the hospital scene was nothing more than a "butcher"-version of Carpenter's 1981 sequel, with the rest of the film feeling like it was rushed and "slapped together" at the last minute. In contrast, Time Out believed the hospital scene at the start of the film "[bested the 1981 sequel] in just about every respect". Time Out stated that Compton's portrayal of Laurie Strode showed an "intense, nontrivializing dedication to the role" that kept interest, while the storyline of Dr. Loomis's egocentricity hinders the overall storyline. Time Out also said that Zombie hurt the film by trying to show how "violence lingers with, and perverts, all who are touched by it", but then undercut himself with "carnivalesque" violence.

The Boston Globe's Tom Russo had varied reactions to the film. Russo pointed out that Zombie attempted to be more inventive with Halloween II, but only achieved mixed results for his efforts. Russo referred to the dream sequences of Deborah Myers and the white horse as "pretentiously silly", but agreed that the scenes did help to break up the standard genre violence and even went so far as to compare the sensation created by those scenes to "Tim Burton doing straight horror". In the end, Russo claimed that "only the most hardcore fans" would want the film series to continue. Joe Neumaier, of the Daily News, stated that Zombie has found himself with Halloween II. Neumaier describes the film as a successful "'character-based' monster-flick". He described Zombie's use of music from the 1970s, like The Moody Blues' "Nights in White Satin" and 10cc's "The Things We Do for Love", as "terrifically odd" throughout the film. Neumaier also said that the imagery of Deborah Myers and the "ethereal white horse" were a "nice visual relief" from Michael's violent attacks.

The British Film Institute was more positive, calling the film the best since the original, as well as the best horror film of 2009.

== Cancelled sequel ==
In 2009, Zombie declined to return to direct the sequel to Halloween II. On August 30 that year, the next film in the series, Halloween 3D, was announced by the Weinstein Company and planned to be released in 2010, retroactively establishing Laurie to have killed Loomis instead of Michael, with Todd Farmer and Patrick Lussier scribing. The film was ultimately cancelled in 2012 after Bob and Harvey Weinstein decided to green light and prioritize Scream 4 (2011) instead. Dimension Films eventually lost the rights to the Halloween franchise. In 2016, Blumhouse Productions acquired the rights to the series. The next installment, 2018's Halloween, served as a direct sequel to the original 1978 and effected a retcon of previous sequels; Universal Pictures distributed the film and its subsequent sequels.
