= Halloween (1978 film) =

Film by John Carpenter

- Theatrical release poster by Robert Gleason
- Directed by: John Carpenter
- Screenplay by: John Carpenter; Debra Hill
- Produced by: Debra Hill
- Starring: Donald Pleasence; Jamie Lee Curtis; P. J. Soles; Nancy Loomis; Nick Castle
- Cinematography: Dean Cundey
- Edited by: Tommy Lee Wallace; Charles Bornstein
- Music by: John Carpenter
- Production companies: Compass International Pictures; Falcon International Productions
- Distributed by: Compass International Pictures; Aquarius Releasing
- Release date: October 27, 1978
- Running time: 91 minutes
- Country: United States
- Language: English
- Budget: $300,000–325,000
- Box office: $70 million

Halloween is a 1978 American independent slasher film directed and scored by John Carpenter, who co-wrote it with producer Debra Hill. It stars Donald Pleasence, Jamie Lee Curtis (in her film debut), P. J. Soles, and Nancy Loomis. The film follows escaped mental patient Michael Myers, who was committed to a mental institution for murdering his teenage sister on Halloween in the fictional Illinois town of Haddonfield; 15 years later, he returns to Haddonfield, where he stalks teenage babysitter Laurie Strode (Curtis) and her friends while his psychiatrist Dr. Samuel Loomis (Pleasence) pursues him.

The film was shot in Southern California, produced by Compass International Pictures, and Falcon International Productions. The film was released by Compass International and Aquarius Releasing in October and grossed $70 million (equivalent to $346 million in 2025) on a budget of $300,000 (equivalent to $1,480,900 in 2025), becoming one of the most profitable independent films of all time. Primarily praised for Carpenter's direction and score, many critics credit the film as pioneering the slasher genre, alongside other films such as Psycho (1960), The Texas Chain Saw Massacre and Black Christmas (both 1974).

Halloween is considered one of the greatest horror films ever made and was selected for preservation in the National Film Registry by the Library of Congress in 2006 as being "culturally, historically, or aesthetically significant". It spawned a film franchise comprising thirteen films, with some sequels narratively diverging entirely from previous installments, as well as a novelization, video game, board game, and comic book series.

== Plot ==
On October 31, 1963, in the suburban Illinois town of Haddonfield, six-year-old Michael Myers brutally stabs his teenage sister Judith to death with a chef's knife.

On October 30, 1978, psychiatrist Dr. Samuel Loomis and nurse Marion Chambers drive to the sanitarium, where Michael is incarcerated, to escort him to a court hearing. Upon arrival, they realize the patients have broken out of the hospital. A male patient jumps on the car roof and attacks Marion from the passenger window. She then runs from the vehicle, allowing the patient to steal the car and drive away. Dr. Loomis concludes that it was Michael Myers. Michael returns to Haddonfield, killing a mechanic and taking his coveralls before stealing a white mask, a rope, and two kitchen knives from a hardware store.

The next morning, on Halloween, Michael begins stalking a teenage girl, Laurie Strode, when she drops off a key at his abandoned childhood home that her realtor father is trying to sell. Laurie notices Michael throughout the day, but her friends Annie Brackett and Lynda Van Der Klok dismiss her concerns. Loomis arrives in Haddonfield and discovers that Michael has stolen Judith's tombstone from the local cemetery. He meets up with the town sheriff, Annie's father Leigh Brackett, and they visit Michael's home where they are convinced that Michael has returned to Haddonfield.

That evening, Michael follows Annie and Laurie to their babysitting jobs. Laurie watches Tommy Doyle, while Annie stays with Lindsey Wallace across the street. Michael spies on Annie and kills Lester, the family's German Shepherd. Tommy spots Michael from the windows and thinks he is the boogeyman, but Laurie sees nothing and dismisses him. Annie takes Lindsey to the Doyle house so she can pick up her boyfriend while Laurie watches both of the kids. Michael hides in Annie's car and strangles her before cutting her throat. Lynda and her boyfriend Bob arrive at the Wallace house and have sex. Bob then goes downstairs to get a beer from the kitchen, where Michael pins him to the wall with a chef's knife. Michael poses as Bob in a ghost costume to taunt Lynda, who teases him to no effect. Annoyed, she calls Laurie to find out what happened to Annie, but Michael strangles her with the phone cord while Laurie listens on the other end, not knowing what is happening. Meanwhile, Loomis discovers the stolen car and searches the streets.

Worried by the phone call, Laurie goes to the Wallace house and finds her friends' bodies and Judith's tombstone in one of the upstairs bedrooms. She runs into the hallway, where Michael slashes her arm, causing her to fall over the banister to the first floor. Though injured, she escapes the house and flees back to the Doyle house with Michael in pursuit. Tommy lets her in, and she orders him and Lindsey to hide. Laurie tries to call for help, only to find the phone dead. Michael sneaks in through the window and attempts to attack Laurie again, but she defends herself by stabbing him in the neck with a knitting needle, causing him to collapse.

Thinking Michael is dead, Laurie crawls upstairs to check on the children, where she tells them that she killed the "boogeyman", but Tommy insists that you cannot kill the boogeyman just as Michael reappears upstairs with a knife causing the trio to retreat. While Tommy and Lindsey hide in the bathroom, Laurie lures Michael to the bedroom closet and stabs him in the eye with a piece of wire hanger and in the chest with his own knife. After Laurie sends Tommy and Lindsey to a neighbor's house to call the police, Michael rises and attacks her again. Seeing the kids screaming from the house, Loomis investigates and finds Laurie fighting Michael off by dislodging his mask, revealing his face. As Michael puts his mask back on, Loomis recognizes him and shoots him repeatedly, causing him to fall off the bedroom balcony. When Loomis goes to check on the body, he is unsurprised to see that Michael has vanished. He stares into the night as Laurie sobs in terror.

== Cast ==
From left: Nancy Loomis, P. J. Soles and Jamie Lee Curtis in a publicity photograph for the film

- Donald Pleasence as Dr. Samuel "Sam" Loomis
- Jamie Lee Curtis as Laurie Strode
- Nick Castle (Note: John Carpenter and Tommy Lee Wallace also play The Shape in some scenes) as The Shape (Michael Myers masked)
  - Tony Moran as Michael Myers – age 21 (Note: mistakenly 23 in credits) (Note: When Michael Myers is unmasked at the end of the film)
  - Will Sandin as Michael Myers – age 6
- Nancy Kyes as Annie Brackett (credited as Nancy Loomis)
- P. J. Soles as Lynda Van Der Klok
- Charles Cyphers as Sheriff Leigh Brackett
- Kyle Richards as Lindsey Wallace
- Brian Andrews as Tommy Doyle
- John Michael Graham as Bob Simms
- Nancy Stephens as Marion Chambers
- Arthur Malet as Angus Taylor
- Mickey Yablans as Richie Castle
- Brent Le Page as Lonnie Elam
- Adam Hollander as Keith
- Robert Phalen as Dr. Wynn
- Sandy Johnson as Judith Myers
- Peter Griffith as Morgan Strode
- David Kyle Foster as Judith's boyfriend (credited as David Kyle)
- John Carpenter as Paul, Annie’s boyfriend (uncredited)

== Analysis ==
=== Themes ===
Nick Castle as Michael Myers in a publicity photograph for the film

Scholar Carol J. Clover has argued that the film, and its genre at large, links sexuality with danger, saying that killers in slasher films are fueled by a "psychosexual fury" and that all the killings are sexual in nature. She reinforces this idea by saying that "guns have no place in slasher films" and when examining the film I Spit on Your Grave she notes that "a hands-on killing answers a hands-on rape in a way that a shooting, even a shooting preceded by a humiliation, does not." Equating sex with violence is important in Halloween and the slasher genre according to film scholar Pat Gill, who made a note of this in her essay "The Monstrous Years: Teens, Slasher Films, and the Family". She remarks that Laurie's friends "think of their babysitting jobs as opportunities to share drinks and beds with their boyfriends. One by one they are killed ... by Michael Myers an asylum escapee who years ago at the age of six murdered his sister for preferring sex to taking care of him." Carpenter has distanced himself from these interpretations, saying "It has been suggested that I was making some kind of moral statement. Believe me, I'm not. In Halloween, I viewed the characters as simply normal teenagers." In another interview, Carpenter said that readings of the film as a morality play "completely missed the point," adding, "The one girl who is the most sexually uptight just keeps stabbing this guy with a long knife. She's the most sexually frustrated. She's the one that's killed him. Not because she's a virgin but because all that sexually repressed energy starts coming out. She uses all those phallic symbols on the guy." Debra Hill, who co-wrote and produced the film, also dismissed the idea saying, "There was absolutely no intent for that to be the underlying reason. I was raised a Catholic schoolgirl and what leaked into the script is my Catholic sensibility. It was totally unintentional."

Some feminist critics, according to historian Nicholas Rogers, "have seen the slasher movies since Halloween as debasing women in as decisive a manner as hard-core pornography." Critics such as John Kenneth Muir state that female characters such as Laurie Strode survive not because of "any good planning" or their own resourcefulness, but sheer luck. Although she manages to repel the killer several times, in the end, Strode is rescued in Halloween and Halloween II only when Dr. Loomis arrives to shoot Myers. However, Clover has argued that despite the violence against women, Halloween and other slasher films turned women into heroines. In many pre-Halloween horror films, women are depicted as helpless victims and are not safe until they are rescued by a strong masculine hero. Despite the fact that Loomis saves Strode, Clover asserts that Halloween initiates the role of the "final girl" who ultimately triumphs. Strode fights back against Myers and severely wounds him. Had Myers been a normal man, Strode's attacks would have killed him; even Loomis, the male hero of the story, who shoots Michael repeatedly with a revolver, cannot kill him. Aviva Briefel argued that moments such as when Michael's face was temporarily revealed are meant to give pleasure to the male viewer. Briefel further argues that these moments are masochistic in nature and give pleasure to men because they are willingly submitting themselves to the women of the film; they submit themselves temporarily because it will make their return to authority even more powerful.

Critics, such as Gill, see Halloween as a critique of American social values. She remarks that parental figures are almost entirely absent throughout the film, noting that when Laurie is attacked by Michael while babysitting, "No parents, either of the teenagers or of the children left in their charge, call to check on their children or arrive to keen over them."

According to Gill, the dangers of suburbia is another major theme that runs throughout the film and the slasher genre at large: Gill states that slasher films "seem to mock white flight to gated communities, in particular the attempts of parents to shield their children from the dangerous influences represented by the city." Halloween and slasher films, generally, represent the underside of suburbia to Gill. Myers was raised in a suburban household and after he escapes the mental hospital he returns to his hometown to kill again; Myers is a product of the suburban environment, writes Gill.

Michael is thought by some to represent evil in the film. This is based on the common belief that evil never dies, nor does evil show remorse. This idea is demonstrated in the film when Dr. Loomis discusses Michael's history with the sheriff. Loomis states, "I spent eight years trying to reach him [Michael Myers], and then another seven trying to keep him locked up because I realized that what was living behind that boy's eyes was purely and simply ... evil." Loomis also refers to Michael as "evil" when he steals his car at the sanitarium. This further emphasizes why Michael wears the mask as he " Wears his villainy plainly on his face." Yet we still question how evil Michael is without knowing his true motivation throughout the first film. We come to the end of the film, and Michael once again roams the streets of Haddonfield as evil never dies.

=== Aesthetic elements ===
Judith Myers and her boyfriend, as viewed from the point-of-view of young Michael Myers; this voyeuristic perspective is a distinguishing feature of the film's opening scene

Historian Nicholas Rogers notes that film critics contend that Carpenter's direction and camera work made Halloween a "resounding success." Roger Ebert remarks, "It's easy to create violence on the screen, but it's hard to do it well. Carpenter is uncannily skilled, for example, at the use of foregrounds in his compositions, and everyone who likes thrillers knows that foregrounds are crucial . ... " The opening title, featuring a jack-o'-lantern placed against a black backdrop, sets the mood for the entire film. The camera slowly moves toward the jack-o'-lantern's left eye as the main title theme plays. After the camera fully closes in, the jack-o'-lantern's light dims and goes out. Film historian J.P. Telotte says that this scene "clearly announces that [the film's] primary concern will be with the way in which we see ourselves and others and the consequences that often attend our usual manner of perception." Carpenter's first-person point-of-view compositions were employed with steadicam; Telotte argues, "As a result of this shift in perspective from a disembodied, narrative camera to an actual character's eye ... we are forced into a deeper sense of participation in the ensuing action." Along with the 1974 Canadian horror film Black Christmas, Halloween made use of seeing events through the killer's eyes.

The first scene of the young Michael's voyeurism is followed by the murder of Judith seen through the eye holes of Michael's clown costume mask. According to scholar Nicholas Rogers, Carpenter's "frequent use of the unmounted first-person camera to represent the killer's point of view ... invited [viewers] to adopt the murderer's assaultive gaze and to hear his heavy breathing and plodding footsteps as he stalked his prey." Film analysts have noted its delayed or withheld representations of violence, characterized as the "false startle" or "the old tap-on-the-shoulder routine" in which the stalkers, murderers, or monsters "lunge into our field of vision or creep up on a person." Critic Susan Stark described the film's opening sequence in her 1978 review:

In a single, wonderfully fluid tracking shot, the camera establishes the quiet character of a suburban street, the sexual hanky-panky going on between a teenage couple in one of the staid-looking homes, the departure of the boyfriend, a hand in the kitchen drawer removing a butcher's knife, the view on the way upstairs from behind the eye-slits of a Halloween mask, the murder of a half-nude young girl seated at her dressing table, the descent downstairs and whammo! The killer stands speechless on the lawn, holding the bloody knife, a small boy in a satin clown suit with a newly-returned parent on each side shrieking in an attempt to find out what the spectacle means.

== Production ==
=== Concept ===
After viewing John Carpenter's film Assault on Precinct 13 (1976) at the Milan Film Festival, independent film producer Irwin Yablans and financier Moustapha Akkad sought out Carpenter to direct a film for them about a psychotic killer that stalked babysitters. In an interview with Fangoria magazine, Yablans stated: "I was thinking what would make sense in the horror genre, and what I wanted to do was make a picture that had the same impact as The Exorcist (1973)". Carpenter agreed to direct the film contingent on his having full creative control, and was paid $10,000 (equivalent to $49,400 in 2025) for his work, which included writing, directing, and scoring the film. He and his then-girlfriend Debra Hill began drafting the story of Halloween. There were claims as early as 1980 that the film at one point was supposed to be called The Babysitter Murders but Yablans has since debunked this stating that it was always intended to be called (and take place on) Halloween. Carpenter said of the basic concept: "Halloween night. It has never been the theme in a film. My idea was to do an old haunted house film."

Film director Bob Clark suggested in an interview released in 2005 that Carpenter had asked him for his own ideas for a sequel to his 1974 film Black Christmas (written by Roy Moore) that featured an unseen and motiveless killer murdering students in a university sorority house. As also stated in the 2009 documentary Clarkworld (written and directed by Clark's former production designer Deren Abram after Clark's tragic death in 2007), Carpenter directly asked Clark about his thoughts on developing the anonymous slasher in Black Christmas:

... I did a film about three years later, started a film with John Carpenter, it was his first film for Warner Bros. (which picked up Black Christmas), he asked me if I was ever gonna do a sequel and I said no. I was through with horror, I didn't come into the business to do just horror. He said, 'Well what would you do if you did do a sequel?' I said it would be the next year and the guy would have actually been caught, escape from a mental institution, go back to the house and they would start all over again. And I would call it Halloween. The truth is John didn't copy Black Christmas, he wrote a script, directed the script, did the casting. Halloween is his movie and besides, the script came to him already titled anyway. He liked Black Christmas and may have been influenced by it, but in no way did John Carpenter copy the idea. Fifteen other people at that time had thought to do a movie called Halloween but the script came to John with that title on it.

— Bob Clark, 2005 interview, Icons of Fright

=== Screenplay ===
It took approximately 10 days to write the screenplay. Yablans and Akkad ceded most of the creative control to writers Carpenter and Hill (whom Carpenter wanted as producer), but Yablans did offer several suggestions. According to a Fangoria interview with Hill, "Yablans wanted the script written like a radio show, with 'boos' every 10 minutes." By Hill's recollection, the script took three weeks to write, and much of the inspiration behind the plot came from Celtic traditions of Halloween such as the festival of Samhain. Although Samhain is not mentioned in the plot of the first film, Hill asserts that:

... the idea was that you couldn't kill evil, and that was how we came about the story. We went back to the old idea of Samhain, that Halloween was the night where all the souls are let out to wreak havoc on the living, and then came up with the story about the most evil kid who ever lived. And when John came up with this fable of a town with a dark secret of someone who once lived there, and now that evil has come back, that's what made Halloween work.

I met this six-year-old child with this blank, pale, emotionless face, and the blackest eyes; the devil's eyes ... I realized what was living behind that boy's eyes was purely and simply ... evil.

— Loomis' description of a young Michael was inspired by John Carpenter's experience with a real life mental patient

Hill, who had worked as a babysitter during her teenage years, wrote most of the female characters' dialogue, while Carpenter drafted Loomis' speeches on the soullessness of Michael Myers. Many script details were drawn from Carpenter's and Hill's own backgrounds and early careers: The fictional town of Haddonfield, Illinois was derived from Haddonfield, New Jersey, where Hill was raised, while several of the street names were taken from Carpenter's hometown of Bowling Green, Kentucky. Laurie Strode was allegedly the name of one of Carpenter's old girlfriends, while Michael Myers was the name of an English producer who had previously entered, with Yablans, Assault on Precinct 13 in various European film festivals. Homage is paid to Alfred Hitchcock with two characters' names: Tommy Doyle is named after Lt. Det. Thomas J. Doyle (Wendell Corey) from Rear Window (1954), and Dr. Loomis' name was derived from Sam Loomis (John Gavin) from Psycho, the boyfriend of Marion Crane (Janet Leigh, who is the real-life mother of Jamie Lee Curtis). Sheriff Leigh Brackett shared the name of a Hollywood screenwriter and frequent collaborator of Howard Hawks.

In devising the backstory for the film's villain, Michael Myers, Carpenter drew on "haunted house" folklore that exists in many small American communities: "Most small towns have a kind of haunted house story of one kind or another," he stated. "At least that's what teenagers believe. There's always a house down the lane that somebody was killed in, or that somebody went crazy in." Carpenter also took inspiration from the character of The Gunslinger from Westworld (1973) for Michael Myers. Carpenter's inspiration for the "evil" that Michael embodied came from a visit he had taken during college to a psychiatric institution in Kentucky. There, he visited a ward with his psychology classmates where "the most serious, mentally ill patients" were held. Among those patients was an adolescent boy, who possessed a blank, "schizophrenic stare". Carpenter's experience inspired the characterization that Loomis gave of Michael to Sheriff Brackett in the film. Debra Hill has stated the scene where Michael kills the Wallaces' German Shepherd was done to illustrate how he is "really evil and deadly".

The ending scene of Michael disappearing after being shot six times and falling off the balcony, was meant to terrify the imagination of the audience. Using a montage of the houses as Michael's breathing is heard, Carpenter tried to keep the audience guessing as to who Michael Myers really is—he is gone, and everywhere at the same time; he is more than human; he may be supernatural, and no one knows how he got that way. To Carpenter, keeping the audience guessing was better than explaining away the character with "he's cursed by some..."

Carpenter has described Halloween as: "True crass exploitation. I decided to make a film I would love to have seen as a kid, full of cheap tricks like a haunted house at a fair where you walk down the corridor and things jump out at you."

=== Casting ===
Jamie Lee Curtis dressed as Laurie Strode in the film

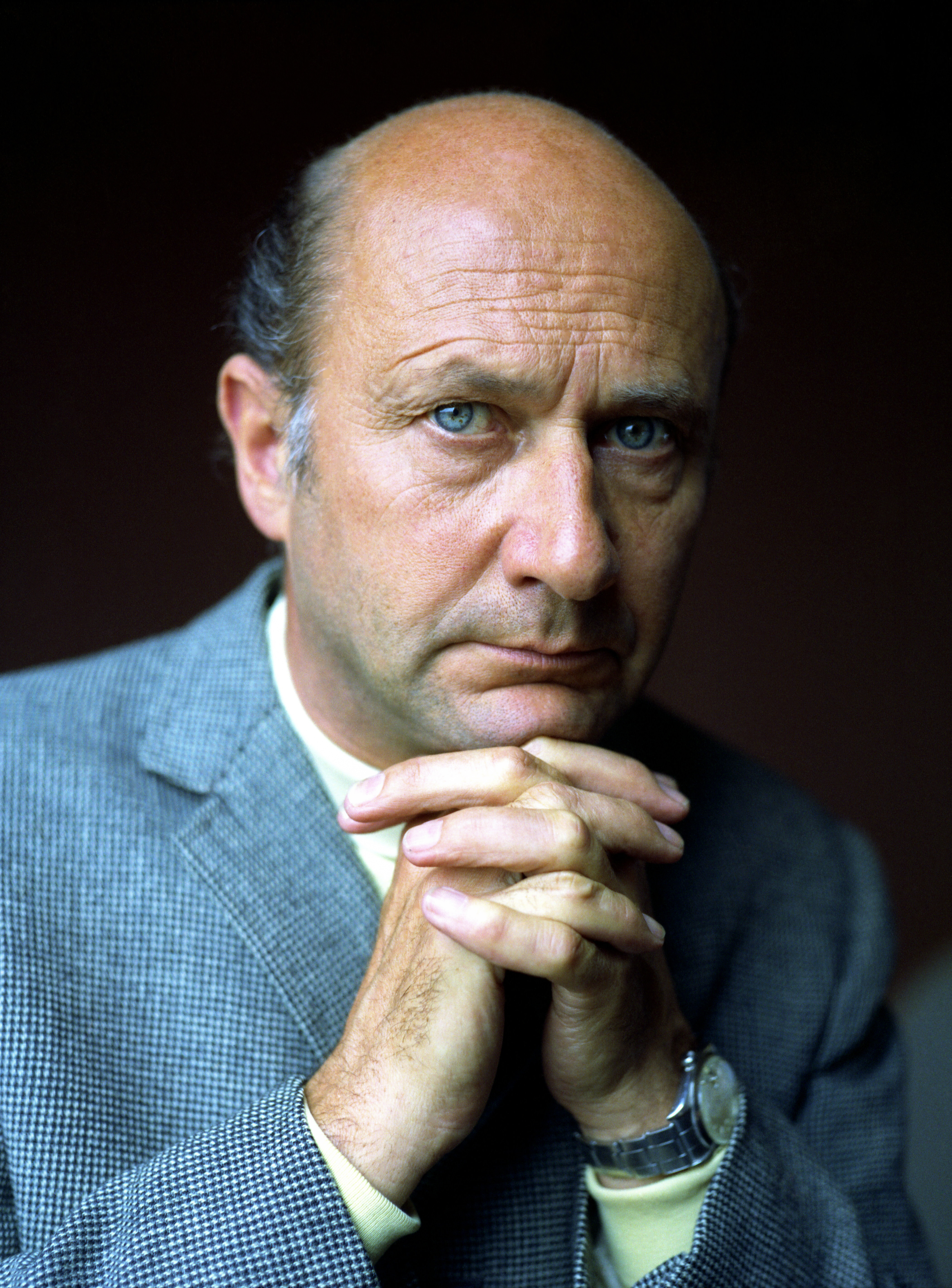
Donald Pleasence plays Dr. Sam Loomis, the hero of the film

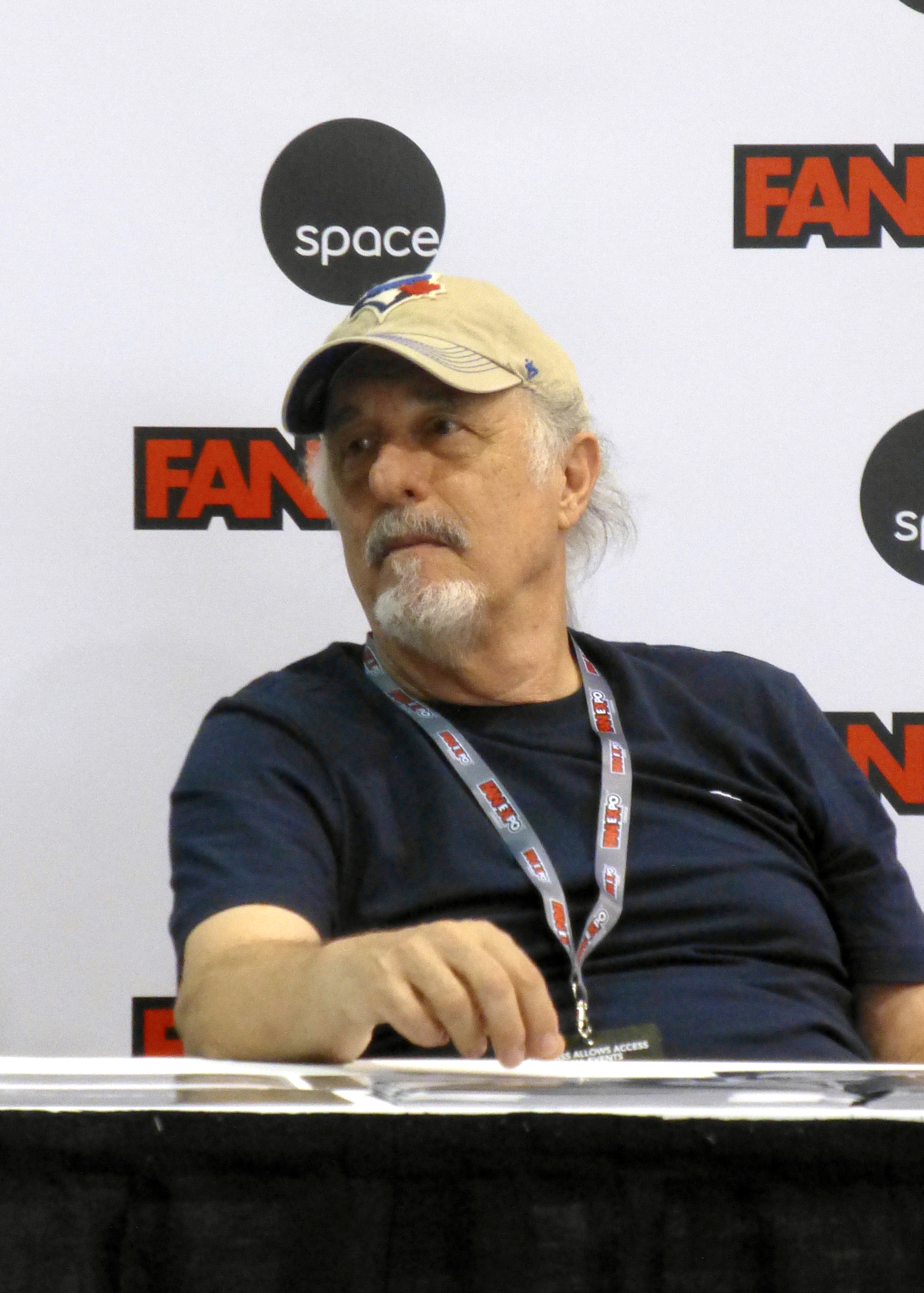
Nick Castle played the adult version of Michael Myers

The cast of Halloween included veteran actor Donald Pleasence as Samuel Loomis and then-unknown actress Jamie Lee Curtis as Laurie Strode. The low budget limited the number of big names that Carpenter could attract, and most of the actors received very little compensation for their roles. Pleasence was paid the highest amount at $20,000 (equivalent to $98,700 in 2025), Curtis received $8,000, and Nick Castle earned $25 a day. The role of Dr. Loomis was originally intended for Peter Cushing, who had recently appeared as Grand Moff Tarkin in Star Wars (1977); Cushing's agent rejected Carpenter's offer due to the low salary. Christopher Lee was approached for the role; he too turned it down, although the actor later told Carpenter and Hill that declining the role was the biggest mistake he made during his career. Yablans then suggested Pleasence, who agreed to star because his daughter Lucy, a guitarist, had enjoyed Assault on Precinct 13 for Carpenter's score.

In an interview, Carpenter admits that "Jamie Lee wasn't the first choice for Laurie. I had no idea who she was. She was 19 and in a TV show at the time, but I didn't watch TV." He originally wanted to cast Anne Lockhart, the daughter of June Lockhart from Lassie, as Laurie Strode. However, Lockhart had commitments to several other film and television projects. Hill says of learning that Jamie Lee was the daughter of Psycho actress Janet Leigh: "I knew casting Jamie Lee would be great publicity for the film because her mother was in Psycho." Curtis was cast in the part, though she initially had reservations as she felt she identified more with the other female characters: "I was very much a smart alec, and was a cheerleader in high school, so [I] felt very concerned that I was being considered for the quiet, repressed young woman when in fact I was very much like the other two girls."

Another relatively unknown actress, Nancy Kyes (credited in the film as Nancy Loomis), was cast as Laurie's outspoken friend Annie Brackett, daughter of Haddonfield sheriff Leigh Brackett (Charles Cyphers). Kyes had previously starred in Assault on Precinct 13 (as had Cyphers) and happened to be dating Halloween's art director Tommy Lee Wallace when filming began. Carpenter chose P. J. Soles to play Lynda Van Der Klok, another loquacious friend of Laurie's, best remembered in the film for dialogue peppered with the word "totally." Soles was an actress known for her supporting role in Carrie (1976) and her minor part in The Boy in the Plastic Bubble (1976) and would subsequently play Riff Randall in the 1979 film Rock 'n Roll High School. According to Soles, she was told after being cast that Carpenter had written the role with her in mind. Soles's then-husband, actor Dennis Quaid, was considered for the role of Bob Simms, Lynda's boyfriend, but was unable to perform the role due to prior work commitments.

The role of "The Shape"—as the masked Michael Myers character was billed in the end credits—was played by Nick Castle, who befriended Carpenter while they attended the University of Southern California. After Halloween, Castle became a director, taking the helm of films such as The Last Starfighter (1984), The Boy Who Could Fly (1986), Dennis the Menace (1993), and Major Payne (1995). Tony Moran plays the unmasked Michael at the end of the film. Moran was a struggling actor before he got the role. At the time, he had a job on Hollywood and Vine dressed up as Frankenstein. Moran had the same agent as his sister, Erin, who played Joanie Cunningham on Happy Days. When Moran went to audition for the role of Michael, he met for an interview with Carpenter and Yablans. He later got a call back and was told he had got the part. Moran was paid $250 for his appearance. Will Sandin played the unmasked young Michael in the beginning of the film. Carpenter also provided uncredited voice work as Paul, Annie's boyfriend.

=== Filming ===
Akkad agreed to put up $300,000 (equivalent to $1,480,900 in 2025)) for the film's budget, which was considered low at the time (Carpenter's previous film, Assault on Precinct 13, had an estimated budget of $100,000). Akkad worried over the tight, four-week schedule, low budget, and Carpenter's limited experience as a filmmaker, but told Fangoria: "Two things made me decide. One, Carpenter told me the story verbally and in a suspenseful way, almost frame for frame. Second, he told me he didn't want to take any fees, and that showed he had confidence in the project". Carpenter received $10,000 (equivalent to $49,400 in 2025) for directing, writing, and composing the music, retaining rights to 10 percent of the film's profits.

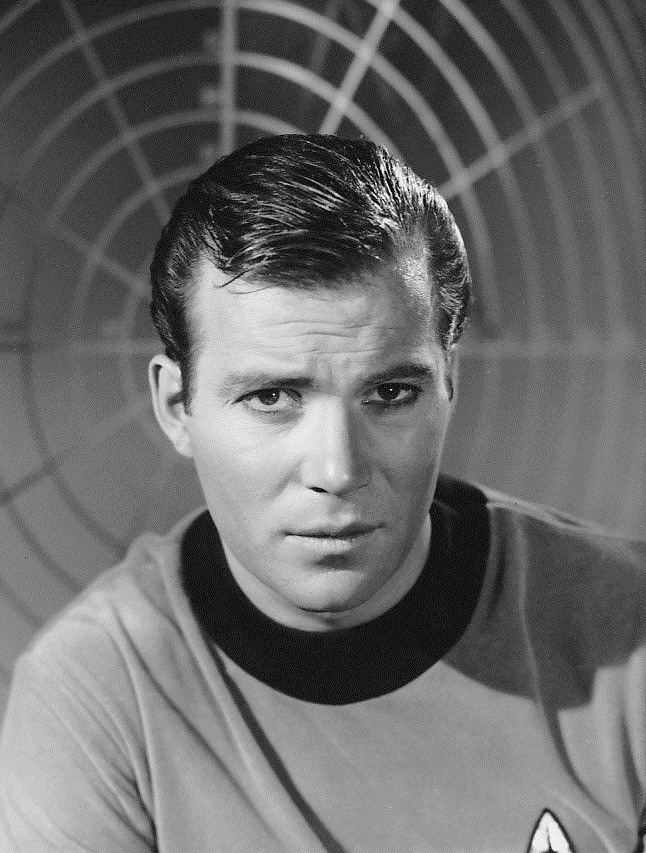
Production designer Tommy Lee Wallace used a mask modeled after William Shatner's Captain Kirk from the Star Trek series (pictured), making various modifications such as painting it white, widening its eyes, and altering its hair.

Because of the low budget, wardrobe and props were often crafted from items on hand or that could be purchased inexpensively. Carpenter hired Tommy Lee Wallace as production designer, art director, location scout and co-editor. Wallace created the trademark mask worn by Michael Myers throughout the film from a Captain Kirk mask purchased for $1.98 (equivalent to $9.77 in 2025) from a costume shop on Hollywood Boulevard. The mask, made by Don Post Studios, used a mold of Shatner's face taken during production of the 1975 horror film The Devil's Rain, although Shatner has stated that the mold was taken during the production of Star Trek. Carpenter recalled how Wallace "widened the eye holes and spray-painted the flesh a bluish white. In the script it said Michael Myers's mask had 'the pale features of a human face' and it truly was spooky looking. I can only imagine the result if they hadn't painted the mask white. Children would be checking their closet for William Shatner after Tommy got through with it." Hill adds that the "idea was to make him almost humorless, faceless—this sort of pale visage that could resemble a human or not." Many of the actors wore their own clothes, and Curtis' wardrobe was purchased at J.C. Penney for around $100. Wallace described the filming process as uniquely collaborative, with cast members often helping move equipment, cameras, and helping facilitate set-ups. The vehicle stolen by Michael Myers from Dr Loomis and Nurse Marion Chambers at the Smith Grove Sanitarium was an Illinois government-owned 1978 Ford LTD station wagon rented for two weeks of filming. When filming was complete, the car was returned to the rental company who put it up for auction. Its next owner left it in a barn for decades until selling it to its new owner who has completely restored both its interior and exterior.

Halloween was filmed in 20 days over a four-week period in May 1978. Much of the filming was completed using a Panaglide, a clone of the Steadicam, the then-new camera that allowed the filmmakers to move around spaces smoothly. Filming locations included South Pasadena, California; Garfield Elementary School in Alhambra, California; and the cemetery at Sierra Madre, California. An abandoned house owned by a church stood in as the Myers house. Two homes on Orange Grove Avenue (near Sunset Boulevard) in the Spaulding Square neighborhood of Hollywood were used for the film's climax, as the street had few palm trees, and thus closely resembled a Midwestern street. Some palm trees, however, are visible in the film's earlier establishing scenes. The crew had difficulty finding pumpkins in the spring, and artificial fall leaves had to be reused for multiple scenes. Local families dressed their children in Halloween costumes for trick-or-treat scenes.

Carpenter worked with the cast to create the desired effect of terror and suspense. According to Curtis, Carpenter created a "fear meter" because the film was shot out-of-sequence and she was not sure what her character's level of terror should be in certain scenes. "Here's about a 7, here's about a 6, and the scene we're going to shoot tonight is about a 9 1/2", remembered Curtis. She had different facial expressions and scream volumes for each level on the meter. Carpenter's direction for Castle in his role as Myers was minimal. For example, when Castle asked what Myers' motivation was for a particular scene, Carpenter replied that his motivation was to walk from one set marker to another and "not act." By Carpenter's account the only direction he gave Castle was during the murder sequence of Bob, in which he told Castle to tilt his head and examine the corpse as if it "were a butterfly collection."

=== Musical score ===
Carpenter did the score as he was told that the film "wasn't scary" after doing a test screening. Instead of utilizing a more traditional symphonic soundtrack, the film's score consists primarily of a piano melody played in a 10/8 or "complex 5/4" time signature, composed and performed by Carpenter. It took him three days to compose and record the entire score for the film. Following the film's critical and commercial success, the "Halloween Theme" became recognizable apart from the film. Carpenter said it was also done in an hour. Critic James Berardinelli calls the score "relatively simple and unsophisticated", but admits that "Halloween's music is one of its strongest assets". Carpenter once stated in an interview, "I can play just about any keyboard, but I can't read or write a note." In Halloween's end credits, Carpenter bills himself as the "Bowling Green Philharmonic Orchestra", but he also received assistance from composer Dan Wyman, a music professor at San José State University.

Some non-score songs can be heard in the film, one an untitled song performed by Carpenter and a group of his friends in a band called The Coupe De Villes. The song can be heard as Laurie steps into Annie's car on her way to babysit Tommy Doyle. Another song, "(Don't Fear) The Reaper" by classic rock band Blue Öyster Cult, also appears in the film. It plays on the car radio as Annie drives Laurie through Haddonfield with Myers in silent pursuit.

The soundtrack was first released in the United States in October 1983, by Varèse Sarabande/MCA. It was subsequently released on CD in 1985, re-released in 1990, and reissued again in 2000. On the film's 40th anniversary, coinciding with the release of Anthology: Movie Themes 1974–1998, a cover of the theme by Trent Reznor and Atticus Ross was released.

== Release ==
Ad, The Village Voice, November 6, 1978: only known, published window for date of film's New York City premiere ("Held over ... 2nd week") (Note: While the review gives no New York City premiere date or specific theater, a display advertisement on page 72 reads: "Held over! 2nd week of horror! At a Flagship Theatre near you". Per the movie listings on pages 82, 84 and 85, respectively, it played at four since-defunct theaters: the Essex, located at 375 Grand Street in Chinatown, per Cinema Treasures: Essex Theatre; the RKO 86th Street Twin, on East 86th Street near Lexington Avenue; the Rivoli, located at 1620 Broadway, in the Times Square area, per Cinema Treasures: Rivoli Theatre; and the Times Square Theatre, located at 217 West 42nd Street, per Treasures:Times Square Theater)

=== Theatrical distribution ===
Halloween premiered on October 24, 1978, in downtown Kansas City, Missouri, at the AMC Empire theatre. Regional distribution in the Philadelphia and New York City metropolitan areas was handled by Aquarius Releasing. It grossed $1,270,000 (equivalent to $6,269,000 in 2025) from 198 theatres across the U.S. (including 72 in New York City and 98 in Southern California) in its opening week. The film grossed $47 million in the United States and an additional $23 million internationally, making the theatrical total $70 million (equivalent to $346 million in 2025), making it one of the most successful independent films of all time; the film sold approximately 20,153,846 tickets during its initial theatrical release, and remains the most successful release of any Halloween film and the third most successful film in the slasher genre behind Scream (1996) and Scream 2 (1997).

On September 7, 2012, the official Halloween Movies Facebook page announced that the original Halloween would be re-released starting October 25, 2013, in celebration of the film's 35th anniversary in 2013. A new documentary was screened before the film at all locations, titled You Can't Kill the Boogeyman: 35 Years of Halloween, written and directed by HalloweenMovies.com webmaster Justin Beahm.

=== Television rights ===
In 1980, the television rights to Halloween were sold to NBC for approximately $3 million (equivalent to $12 million in 2025). After a debate among Carpenter, Hill and NBC's Standards and Practices over censoring of certain scenes, Halloween appeared on television for the first time on October 30, 1981; the broadcast coincided with the release of Halloween II. To fill the two-hour time slot, Carpenter filmed twelve minutes of additional material during the production of Halloween II. The newly filmed scenes include Dr. Loomis at a hospital board review of Michael Myers and Dr. Loomis talking to a then-six-year-old Michael at Smith's Grove, telling him, "You've fooled them, haven't you, Michael? But not me." Another extra scene features Dr. Loomis at Smith's Grove examining Michael's abandoned cell after his escape and seeing the word "Sister" scratched into the door. Finally, a scene was added in which Lynda comes over to Laurie's house to borrow a silk blouse before Laurie leaves to babysit, just as Annie telephones asking to borrow the same blouse. The new scene had Laurie's hair hidden by a towel, since Curtis was by then wearing a much shorter hairstyle than she had worn in 1978.

In August 2006, Fangoria reported that Synapse Films had discovered boxes of negatives containing footage cut from the film. One was labeled "1981" suggesting that it was additional footage for the television version of the film. Synapse owner Don May Jr. said, "What we've got is pretty much all the unused original camera negative from Carpenter's original Halloween. Luckily, Billy [Kirkus] was able to find this material before it was destroyed. The story on how we got the negative is a long one, but we'll save it for when we're able to showcase the materials in some way. Kirkus should be commended for pretty much saving the Holy Grail of horror films". He later claimed: "We just learned from Sean Clark, long time Halloween genius, that the footage found is just that: footage. There is no sound in any of the reels so far, since none of it was used in the final edit".

=== Home media ===
Since Halloween's premiere, it has been released in several home video formats. Early VHS versions were released by Media Home Entertainment. This release subsequently became a collector's item, with one copy from 1979 selling on eBay for $13,220 (equivalent to $18,300 in 2025) in 2013. On August 3, 1995, Blockbuster Video issued a commemorative edition of the film on VHS.

As stated, the film was first released on VHS in 1979 and again in 1981 by Media Home Entertainment. The synopsis on the back misspelled Myers as Meyers. The film was also released on Betamax around that same time. It was not released in CED format (capacitance electronic disc), unlike Halloween II and Halloween III, but it was released on Laser Disc.

The film was released for the first time on DVD in the United States by Anchor Bay Entertainment on October 28, 1997. To date, that DVD release is the only one to feature the original mono audio track as heard in theaters in 1978 and on most home video releases that preceded it. Anchor Bay re-released the film on DVD in various other editions; among these were an "extended edition," which features the original theatrical release with the scenes that were shot for the broadcast TV version edited in at their proper places. In 1999, Anchor Bay issued a two-disc limited edition, which featured both the theatrical and "extended editions," as well as lenticular cover art and lobby cards. In 2003, Anchor Bay released a two-disc "25th Anniversary edition" with improved DiviMax picture and audio, along with an audio commentary by Carpenter, Curtis and Hill, among other features.

On October 2, 2007, the film was released for the first time on Blu-ray by Anchor Bay/Starz Home Entertainment. The following year, a "30th Anniversary Commemorative Set" was issued, containing DVD and Blu-ray versions of the film, the sequels Halloween 4: The Return of Michael Myers and Halloween 5: The Revenge of Michael Myers, and a replica Michael Myers mask. A 35th-anniversary Blu-ray was released in October 2013, featuring a new transfer supervised by cinematographer Dean Cundey. This release earned a Saturn Award for Best Classic Film Release. In September 2014, Scream Factory teamed with Anchor Bay Entertainment to release the film as part of a Blu-ray boxed set featuring every film in the series (up to 2009's Halloween II), made available in a standard and limited edition.

The film was released by Lionsgate Home Entertainment (Anchor Bay's successor) in an Ultra HD Blu-ray and Blu-ray edition for the film's 40th anniversary. It is also available online for computer and other devices viewing (streaming rentals) and downloadable files through Amazon.com, Apple's iTunes Store download application and Vudu.com computer servers.

In France, a collector's edition was released in 2019 which included both the theatrical version and a reconstructed 101-minute extended television version, presented on separate Blu-rays, alongside a DVD and a 64-page book. The release featured documentaries and contributions from French film critics and filmmakers, including Jean-Baptiste Thoret, Julien Sévéon and Pascal Laugier. The project was supported by crowdfunding, raising €38,733 from 805 contributions against a €15,000 target.

In September 2021, Scream Factory released a new 4K Ultra HD Dolby Vision scan of the film, as well as its first four sequels.

== Reception ==
=== Critical response ===
==== Contemporary ====
Upon its initial release, Halloween performed well with little advertising, relying mostly on word-of-mouth, and received mostly positive reviews from critics.

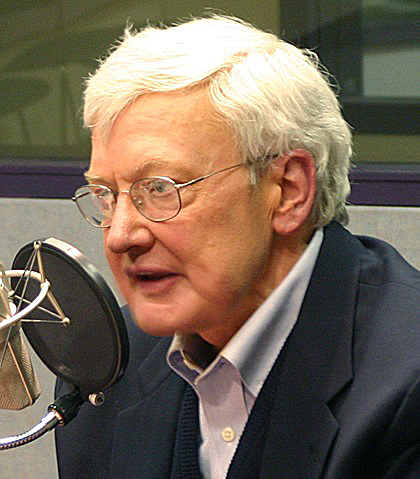
Roger Ebert, an often vocal critic of slasher films, praised Halloween upon its release.

The Los Angeles Times deemed the film a "well-made but empty and morbid thriller", while Bill von Maurer of The Miami Times felt it was "surprisingly good", noting: "Taken on its own level, Halloween is a terrifying movie—if you are the right age and the right mood." Susan Stark of the Detroit Free Press branded Halloween a burgeoning cult film at the time of its release, describing it as "moody in the extreme" and praising its direction and music. Gene Siskel of the Chicago Tribune gave the film three and a half stars out of four and called it "a beautifully made thriller" that "works because director Carpenter knows how to shock while making us smile. He repeatedly sets up anticipation of a shock and delays the shock for varying lengths of time. The tension is considerable. More than once during the movie I looked around just to make sure that no one weird was sitting behind me." Tom Allen of The Village Voice praised the film in his November 1978 review, noting it as sociologically irrelevant but praising its Hitchcock-like technique as effective and "the most honest way to make a good schlock film". Allen pointed out the stylistic similarities to Psycho and George A. Romero's Night of the Living Dead (1968).

Conversely, Pauline Kael wrote a scathing review in The New Yorker suggesting that "Carpenter doesn't seem to have had any life outside the movies: one can trace almost every idea on the screen to directors such as Hitchcock and Brian De Palma and to the Val Lewton productions" and musing that "Maybe when a horror film is stripped of everything but dumb scariness—when it isn't ashamed to revive the stalest device of the genre (the escaped lunatic)—it satisfies part of the audience in a more basic, childish way than sophisticated horror pictures do." Likewise, Gary Arnold of The Washington Post was negative, writing "Since there is precious little character or plot development to pass the time between stalking sequences, one tends to wish the killer would get on with it. Presumably, Carpenter imagines he's building up spine-tingling anticipation, but his techniques are so transparent and laborious that the result is attenuation rather than tension." Lou Cedrone of The Baltimore Evening Sun referred to it as "tediously familiar" and whose only notable element is "Jamie Lee Curtis, whose performance as the intended fourth victim, is well above the rest of the film."

The following months after release, critics continued to praise the film. Voice lead critic Andrew Sarris wrote a follow-up feature on cult films, citing Allen's appraisal of Halloween and writing in the lead sentence that the film "bids fair to become the cult discovery of 1978. Audiences have been heard screaming at its horrifying climaxes". Roger Ebert gave the film similar praise in his 1979 review in the Chicago Sun-Times, with his top rating of four stars. In addition to praise for Carpenter's careful scene construction, Ebert admired the subtle performances from main actors as "ordinary, everyday people" thrust into a terrifying scenario, and said Halloween was "a visceral experience—we aren't seeing the movie, we're having it happen to us. It's frightening. Maybe you don't like movies that are really scary: Then don't see this one." Ebert also selected it as one of his top 10 films of 1978. Once-dismissive critics became impressed by Carpenter's choice of camera angles and simple music and surprised by the lack of blood and graphic violence.

==== Retrospective ====
Years after its debut, Halloween is considered by many critics as one of the best films of 1978. On the review aggregation website Rotten Tomatoes, which records both contemporaneous and more recent reviews, Halloween holds a 97% approval rating based on 92 critic reviews, with an average rating of 9.0/10. The consensus reads: "Scary, suspenseful, and viscerally thrilling, Halloween set the standard for modern horror films." On Metacritic, the film has a weighted average score of 91 out of 100 based on 21 critics, indicating "universal acclaim".

Many compared the film with the work of Alfred Hitchcock, although TV Guide calls comparisons made to Psycho "silly and groundless" and some critics in the late 1980s and early 1990s blamed the film for spawning the slasher subgenre, which they felt had rapidly descended into sadism and misogyny. Scholars such as Adam Rockoff dispute the recurring descriptions of Halloween as overtly violent or gory, commenting that the film is in fact "one of the most restrained horror films", showing very little onscreen violence. Almost a decade after its premiere, Mick Martin and Marsha Porter critiqued the first-person camera shots that earlier film reviewers had praised and later slasher-film directors used for their own films (for example, 1980's Friday the 13th). Claiming it encouraged audience identification with the killer, Martin and Porter pointed to the way "the camera moves in on the screaming, pleading victim, 'looks down' at the knife, and then plunges it into chest, ear, or eyeball. Now that's sick."

=== Accolades ===
Halloween was nominated for the Saturn Award for Best Horror Film by the Academy of Science Fiction, Fantasy & Horror Films in 1979, but lost to The Wicker Man (1973). In 2001, Halloween ranked #68 on the American Film Institute TV program 100 Years ... 100 Thrills. The film was #14 on Bravo's The 100 Scariest Movie Moments (2004). Similarly, the Chicago Film Critics Association named it the 3rd scariest film ever made. In 2006, Halloween was selected for preservation in the United States National Film Registry by the Library of Congress as being "culturally, historically, or aesthetically significant." In 2008, the film was selected by Empire magazine as one of The 500 Greatest Movies of All Time. In 2010, Total Film selected the film as one of The 100 Greatest Movies of All Time. In 2017, Complex magazine named Halloween the best slasher film of all time. The following year, Paste listed it the best slasher film of all time, while Michael Myers was ranked the greatest slasher villain of all time by LA Weekly.

American Film Institute lists

- AFI's 100 Years ... 100 Thrills – #68
- AFI's 100 Years ... 100 Heroes & Villains:
  - Michael Myers – Nominated Villain
- AFI's 100 Years ... 100 Movies (10th Anniversary Edition) – Nominated

== Legacy ==
Halloween is a widely influential film within the horror genre; it was largely responsible for the popularization of slasher films in the 1980s and helped develop the slasher genre. Halloween popularized many tropes that have become completely synonymous with the slasher genre. Halloween helped to popularize the final girl trope, the killing off of characters who are substance abusers or sexually promiscuous, and the use of a theme song for the killer. Carpenter also shot many scenes from the perspective of the killer in order to build tension. These elements have become so established that many historians argue that Halloween is responsible for the new wave of horror that emerged during the 1980s. Due to its popularity, Halloween became a blueprint for success that many other horror films, such as Friday the 13th and A Nightmare on Elm Street, followed, and that others like Scream gave nods towards.

The major themes present in Halloween also became common in the slasher films it inspired. Film scholar Pat Gill notes that in Halloween, there is a theme of absentee parents but films such as A Nightmare on Elm Street and Friday the 13th feature the parents becoming directly responsible for the creation of the killer.

There are slasher films that predated Halloween, such as Silent Night, Bloody Night (1972), The Texas Chain Saw Massacre (1974) and Black Christmas (1974) which contained prominent elements of the slasher genre; both involving a group of teenagers being murdered by a stranger as well as having the final girl trope. Halloween, however, is considered by historians as being responsible for the new wave of horror films, because it not only used these tropes but also pioneered many others. Rockoff notes that it is "difficult to overestimate the importance of Halloween," noting its pioneering use of the final girl character, subjective point-of-view shots, and holiday setting. Rockoff considers the film "the blueprint for all slashers and the model against which all subsequent films are judged."

== Related works ==
=== Novelization and video games ===
A mass market paperback novelization of the same name, written by Curtis Richards (a pseudonym that was used by author Richard Curtis), was published by Bantam Books in 1979. It was reissued in 1982. it later went out of print. The novelization adds aspects not featured in the film, such as the origins of the curse of Samhain and Michael Myers' life in Smith's Grove Sanatorium, which contradict its source material. For example, the novel's version of Michael speaks during his time at the sanitarium; in the film, Dr. Loomis states, "He hasn't spoken a word in fifteen years."

In 1983, Halloween was adapted as a video game for the Atari 2600 by Wizard Video. None of the main characters in the game were named. Players take on the role of a teenage babysitter who tries to save as many children as possible from an unnamed, knife-wielding killer. In another effort to save money, most versions of the game did not even have a label on the cartridge. It was simply a piece of tape with "Halloween" written in marker. The game contained more gore than the film, however. When the babysitter is killed, her head disappears and is replaced by blood pulsating from the neck as she runs around exaggeratedly. The game's primary similarity to the film is the theme music that plays when the killer appears onscreen.

In 2016, the Halloween Chapter was released for the asymmetrical multiplayer horror game, Dead by Daylight. It included Michael Myers and Laurie Strode as the Chapter's Killer and Survivor, respectively, with the town of Haddonfield as a map. Named The Shape (after the character's credited name while masked), his Power, called Evil Within, allows Myers to power-up significantly and become stealthy as he stalks Survivors with his Stalker Mode, and become aggressive and quicker with his Pursuer Mode. Once he has stalked enough Survivors, he can activate Evil Incarnate, which grants access to Slaughtering Strike, a dash-like attack that he can use to instantly knock down targets and destroy any obstacle in his way. His Perks sets a random Survivor as an Obsession, granting him different effects based on said Survivor's condition. Laurie Strode's Perks also revolve on the Obsession mechanic, and increases her chances of being the Killer's Obsession, giving her the tools to fight back, and increasing her chances of escape as the other Survivors are sacrificed or killed. Jamie Lee Curtis' likeness and voice were not used for the character.

In 2025, IllFonic announced Halloween: The Game, a stealth survival horror game based on the 1978 film and co-published with Gun Interactive. The game includes single-player and asymmetrical multiplayer modes and was released on September 8, 2026.

=== Sequels and remake ===
Halloween spawned nine sequels, an unrelated spin-off film and two films in a remake series.

Of the subsequent films, only the first sequel was written by Carpenter and Hill. It begins exactly where Halloween ends and was intended to finish the story of Michael Myers and Laurie Strode. Carpenter did not direct any of the subsequent films in the Halloween series, although he and Hill did produce Halloween III: Season of the Witch, the plot of which is unrelated to the other films in the series due to the absence of Michael Myers. He, along with Alan Howarth, also composed the music for the second and third films. After the negative critical and commercial reception for Season of the Witch, the studio brought back Michael Myers in Halloween 4: The Return of Michael Myers. Financier Moustapha Akkad continued to work closely with the Halloween franchise, acting as executive producer of every sequel until his death in the 2005 Amman bombings.

With the exception of Halloween III, the sequels further develop the character of Michael Myers and the Samhain theme. Even without considering the third film, the Halloween series contains continuity issues, which some sources attribute to the different writers and directors involved in each film.

A remake was released in 2007, and was followed by a 2009 sequel.

An eleventh installment was released in 2018, as a direct sequel to the original film, disregarding the previous sequels, and retconning the ending of the first film. It was followed by two direct sequels: Halloween Kills (2021) and Halloween Ends (2022).

== See also ==
- List of cult films
- List of films featuring psychopaths and sociopaths
- List of films set around Halloween

== Works cited ==
- Allerman, Richard (2013). Hollywood: The Movie Lover's Guide: The Ultimate Insider Tour of Movie L.A. New York: Crown/Archetype. ISBN 978-0-8041-3777-5.
- Badley, Linda (1995). Film, Horror, and the Body Fantastic. Westport, Connecticut, United States: Greenwood Press. ISBN 978-0-313-27523-4.
- Baird, Robert (Spring 2000). "The Startle Effect: Implications for Spectator Cognition and Media Theory". Film Quarterly. 3 (53): 12–24. doi:10.2307/1213732. JSTOR 1213732. S2CID 28472020.
- Briefel, Aviva (Spring 2005). "Monster Pains: Masochism, Menstruation, and Identification in the Horror Film". Film Quarterly. 58 (3): 16–27. doi:10.1525/fq.2005.58.3.16. S2CID 191609222.
- Burnand, David; Mena, Miguel (2004). "Fast and Cheap? The Film Music of John Carpenter". In Conrich, Ian; Woods, David (eds.). The Cinema of John Carpenter: The Technique of Terror. London: Wallflower Press. pp. 49–65. ISBN 978-1-904764-14-4.
- Clover, Carol (Autumn 1987). "Her Body, Himself: Gender in the Slasher Film". Representations (20): 87–228. doi:10.2307/2928507. JSTOR 2928507. S2CID 44603757.
- Clover, Carol (1993). Men, Women, and Chainsaws: Gender in the Modern Horror Film. Princeton, New Jersey: Princeton University Press. OCLC 748991864.
- Conrich, Ian (2004). "Killing Time and Time Again: The Popular Appeal of Carpenters Horror's and the Impact of the Thing and Halloween". In Conrich, Ian; Woods, David (eds.). The Cinema of John Carpenter: The Technique of Terror. London: Wallflower Press. pp. 91–106. ISBN 978-1-904764-14-4.
- Cumbow, Robert C. (2000). Order in the Universe: The Films of John Carpenter (2nd ed.). Scarecrow Press. ISBN 978-0-8108-3719-5.
- Diffrient, David Scott (2004). "A Film is Being Beaten: Notes on the Shock Cut and the Material Violence of Horror". In Hantke, Steffen (ed.). Horror Film: Creating and Marketing Fear. Jackson, Mississippi: University Press of Mississippi. ISBN 978-1-57806-692-6.
- Gill, Pat (Winter 2002). "The Monstrous Years: Teens, Slasher Films, and the Family". Journal of Film and Video. 54 (4): 16–30. JSTOR 20688391. S2CID 190071369.
- Johnson, Kenneth (1993). "The Point of View of the Wandering Camera". Cinema Journal. 2 (32, Winter 1993): 49–56. doi:10.2307/1225604. JSTOR 1225604. S2CID 147402792.
- Jones, Alan (2005). The Rough Guide to Horror Movies. New York: Rough Guides. ISBN 978-1-84353-521-8.
- Karney, Robin (2000). Cinema: Year by Year, 1894–2000 (3rd ed.). London: DK Pub. ISBN 978-0-7894-6118-6.
- King, Stephen (1981). Danse Macabre. New York City: Berkley Books. ISBN 978-0-425-10433-0.
- Larson, Randall D. (1985). Musique Fantastique: A Survey of Film Music in the Fantastic Cinema. Lanham, Maryland: Scarecrow Press. ISBN 978-0-8108-1728-9.
- Le Blanc, Michelle; Odell, Colin (2001). John Carpenter. New York: Pocket Essentials. ISBN 978-1-903047-37-8.
- Leeder, Murray (2014). Halloween. New York: Columbia University Press. ISBN 978-1-906733-86-5.
- Martin, Mick; Porter, Marsha (1986). Video Movie Guide 1987. New York: Ballantine Books. ISBN 978-0-345-33872-3.
- Muir, John Kenneth (1998). Wes Craven: The Art of Horror. Jefferson, North Carolina: McFarland. ISBN 978-0-7864-1923-4.
- Muir, John Kenneth (2011). Horror Films of the 1970s. Jefferson, North Carolina: McFarland. ISBN 978-0-7864-9156-8.
- Muir, John Kenneth (2012). The Films of John Carpenter. Jefferson, North Carolina: McFarland. ISBN 978-0-7864-9348-7.
- Noël, Carroll (Autumn 1987). "The Nature of Horror". Journal of Aesthetics and Art Criticism. 1 (46): 51–59. doi:10.1515/9781942401209-006. S2CID 239368695.
- Perron, Bernard (2009). Horror Video Games: Essays on the Fusion of Fear and Play. Jefferson, North Carolina: McFarland. ISBN 978-0-7864-5479-2.
- Prince, Stephen (2004). The Horror Film. New Brunswick, New Jersey, United States: Rutgers University Press. ISBN 978-0-8135-3363-6.
- Rockoff, Adam (2011). Going to Pieces: The Rise and Fall of the Slasher Film. Jefferson, North Carolina: McFarland. ISBN 978-0-7864-6932-1.
- Rogers, Nicholas (2002). Halloween: From Pagan Ritual to Party Night. Oxford: Oxford University Press. ISBN 978-0-19-516896-9.
- Schneider, Steven Jay (2004). Horror Film and Psychoanalysis: Freud's Worst Nightmare. Cambridge, UK: Cambridge University Press. ISBN 978-0-521-82521-4.
- Smith, Steve; et al. (2003). Halloween: A Cut Above the Rest (Documentary). Prometheus Entertainment. OCLC 929885060.
- Telotte, J.P. (1992). "Through a Pumpkin's Eye: The Reflexive Nature of Horror". In Waller, Gregory (ed.). American Horrors: Essays on the Modern American Horror Film. Urbana, Illinois: University of Illinois Press. ISBN 978-0-252-01448-2.
- Williams, Tony (1996a). "Trying to Survive on the Darker Side: 1980s Family Horror". In Grant, Barry K. (ed.). The Dread of Difference: Gender and the Horror Film. Austin, Texas: University of Texas Press. ISBN 978-0-292-72794-6.
- Williams, Tony (1996b). Hearths of Darkness: The Family in the American Horror Film. Rutherford, New Jersey, United States: Fairleigh Dickinson University Press. ISBN 978-0-8386-3564-3.
