= Tony Moran (actor) =

Producer (born 1957)

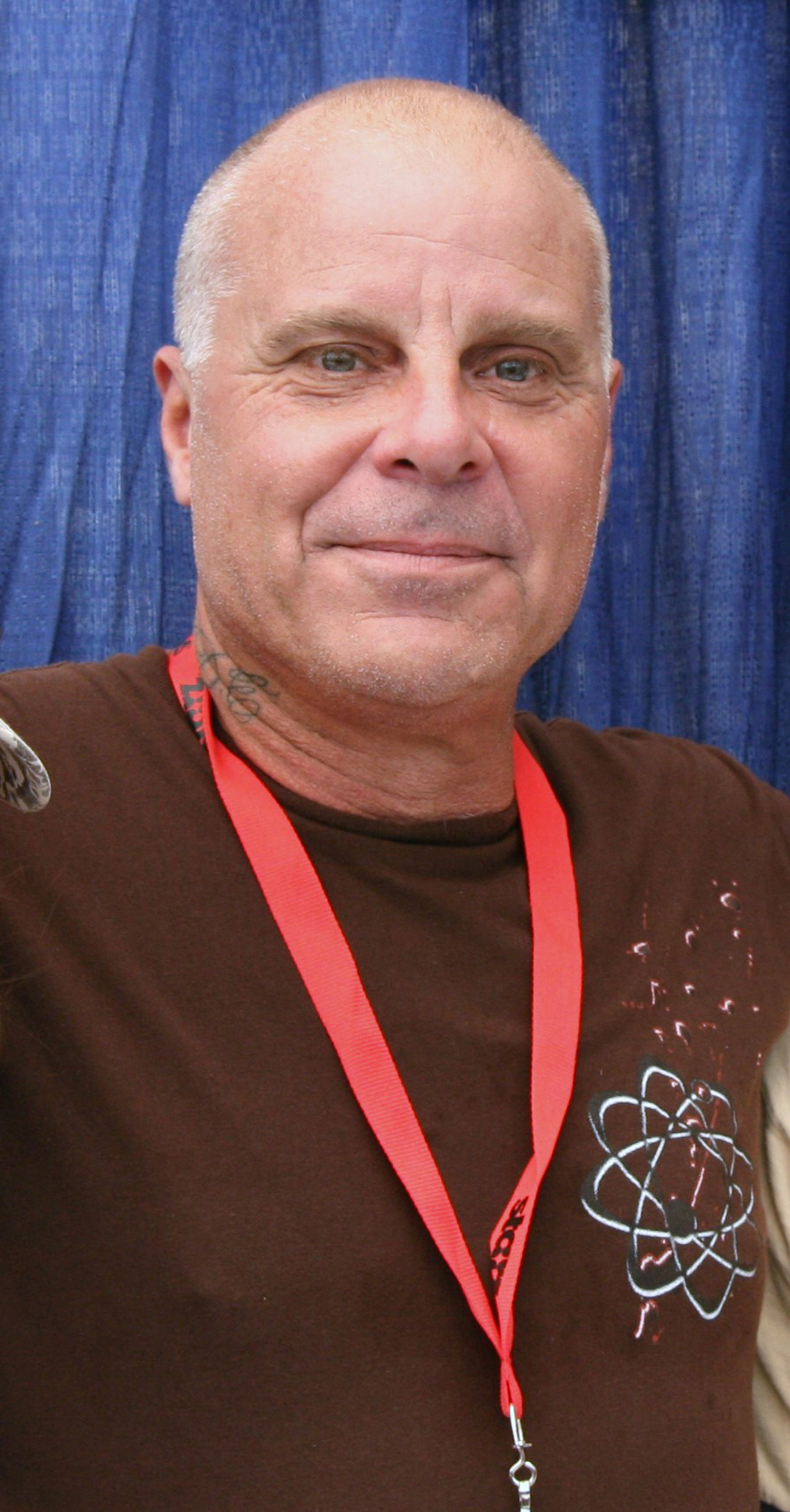
- Moran at the 2009 San Diego Comic-Con
- Born: Anthony Moran; August 14, 1957 (age 69); Burbank, California, U.S.
- Occupations: Actor; producer
- Years active: 1978–1981; 2008–present
- Relatives: Erin Moran (sister)

Anthony Moran (born August 14, 1957) is an American actor and producer. He is known for briefly playing the unmasked Michael Myers in the 1978 horror classic Halloween. Since then, he has gone on to make guest appearances in television series The Waltons and CHiPs. He is the elder brother of fellow actors Erin Moran (of Happy Days fame) and John Moran.

== Career ==
=== Halloween ===
Tony Moran was a struggling actor before he got the role of the unmasked Michael Myers in Halloween. At the time he had a job on Hollywood and Vine dressed up as Frankenstein. Moran had the same agent as his sister, Erin, who played Joanie Cunningham on Happy Days. When Moran went to audition for the role of Michael Myers in 1978, he met for an interview with director John Carpenter and producer Irwin Yablans. He has since stated that he originally did not want to do the movie, only changing his mind when he got confirmation that Donald Pleasence would be in it. He later got a call back and was told he had got the part.

Moran was paid $250 for his appearance in Halloween and did not return for any of the sequels, although he was paid for his appearance at the beginning of Halloween II, which was a recap of the first film.

=== Other work ===
Halloween was Moran's only film for 30 years. Through the late seventies and early eighties, he has made guest appearances in several television series including CHiPs, The Waltons, James at 15, and California Fever.

In 2008, Moran returned to acting with the short film The Lucky Break. In 2010, he produced and starred in the horror film Beg, which also stars his Halloween co-star P.J. Soles. In 2014 he starred in Dead Bounty. In 2014 he appeared in the documentary film Horror Icon: Inside Michael’s Mask with Tony Moran, which premiered in October 2015.

=== Controversy ===
In April 2021, Moran became the subject of controversy after numerous comments he made regarding various Halloween cast members resurfaced online. Moran made unsubstantiated allegations about director John Carpenter's relationship with producer Debra Hill, and insinuated that Jamie Lee Curtis was sexually active with the crew of the film. He was also heard using homophobic slurs towards later Michael Myers actors Tyler Mane and James Jude Courtney during podcast appearances.

Prior to the release of Halloween Kills, Moran made comments at various appearances suggesting he would be appearing in the film in a cameo role. However, Moran does not appear in the final film beyond brief archive footage, leading to speculation that his cameo appearance was cut due to backlash from his then-recent controversy.

Due to his previous conduct, Moran was banned from attending the 2023 Halloween: 45 Years of Terror convention by its organizer, Sean Clark.

== Filmography ==
=== Film ===
Year	Title	Role	Notes
1978	Halloween	Michael Myers (age 21)	
1981	Halloween II	Michael Myers (age 21)	Archive footage
2008	The Lucky Break	Mark Ashby	Short film
2011	Emerging Past	Blind Man	
2011	Beg	Jack Fox	Also producer
2015	The Ungovernable Force	Don Ruggero Corbucci	
2016	American Poltergeist	Doug	
2018	Death House	Miguel	
2020	The Trees Have Eyes	Bossk	
2021	Halloween Kills	Michael Myers (age 21)	Archive footage

=== Television ===
Year	Title	Role	Notes
1978	James at 15	Tom	2 episodes
1979	The Waltons	Tinker	Episode: The Burden
1979	California Fever	Brian	Episode: The Girl from Somewhere
1981	CHiPs	Anderson	Episode: Dead Man's Riddle
