= Ice Age (How to Destroy Angels song) =

Song by How to Destroy Angels

Song by How to Destroy Angels

from the EP An Omen and the album Welcome Oblivion
- Recorded: 2012
- Length: 7:00 (EP version); 6:53 (album version)
- Label: Columbia
- Songwriters: Mariqueen Maandig; Trent Reznor; Atticus Ross; Rob Sheridan
- Producer: How to Destroy Angels

Music video
- "Ice Age" on YouTube

"Ice Age" is a song by American post-industrial group How to Destroy Angels from their second release, An Omen EP. It is also one of four songs from the extended play to be featured on their first full-length release, Welcome Oblivion.

== Music video ==
"Ice Age" is one of three songs from An Omen EP with a music video (the other two being "Keep It Together" and "The Loop Closes"). It was directed by John Hillcoat, unlike the other two videos which were directed by the group themselves. The music video for the song premiered on November 28, 2012 through How to Destroy Angels' Vevo channel on YouTube. It featured on the group's Vimeo page a day later.

The video takes places mainly inside a log cabin built inside a rapidly freezing landscape. It begins predominantly as a performance video, with all four members of the band appearing. As the video progresses, visual distortions, similar to the VHS distortions used in the promotional art for the EP, start to form over the image to give the effect of tape damage, later combined with the effects of CRT monitor distortion. The video progresses to showing "home movie" images, with all people in the footage being blacked out, with the video distortions getting more and more pronounced. The video closes with the room freezing over.

== Remixes ==
The song was remixed by Canadian electronic music producer deadmau5. The remix was originally released through the artist's personal SoundCloud account on June 2, 2012. The song was subsequently released on his 2014 album while(1<2).

The song was also remixed by Luis Vasquez's solo project The Soft Moon. The multi-genre outfit gives the song a darkwave-styled remix that is considerably heavier than the original. It was released as a free download through How to Destroy Angels' SoundCloud on December 11, 2012.
