= The Girl with the Dragon Tattoo (soundtrack) =

Film score by Trent Reznor and Atticus Ross
- Released: 9 December 2011
- Recorded: October 2010 – December 2011 in Los Angeles, CA
- Genres: Electronic; dark ambient; electro-industrial; drone; experimental
- Length: 173:34
- Labels: Null; Mute
- Producers: Trent Reznor; Atticus Ross

Trent Reznor and Atticus Ross chronology
The Social Network (2010)	The Girl with the Dragon Tattoo (2011)	Gone Girl (2014)

The Girl with the Dragon Tattoo is the score album for David Fincher's 2011 film of the same name, composed by Trent Reznor and Atticus Ross. It was released on 9 December 2011, through The Null Corporation in the US and Mute Records outside North America. This is the second soundtrack that Reznor and Ross have worked on together, following the Oscar-winning The Social Network (2010), also for Fincher.

The soundtrack is nearly three hours long, and includes covers of the Led Zeppelin track, "Immigrant Song", featuring Karen O of Yeah Yeah Yeahs, and the Bryan Ferry song, "Is Your Love Strong Enough?", by Reznor and Ross' own band, How to Destroy Angels. The former premiered on KROQ radio on 2 December 2011, and was made available as a download to anyone who purchased the iTunes pre-order of the album. In addition, the file was accompanied with an extended, 8 minute trailer for the film, scored specifically by Reznor and Ross. On 2 December, a six-song sampler of the album was made available for free online along with the pre-release of various different formats of the soundtrack.

The score was nominated for the 2011 Golden Globe award for Best Original Score – Motion Picture, and won the 2012 Grammy award for Best Score Soundtrack For Visual Media. The album debuted on the UK Albums Chart on 7 January 2012 at #199.

== Promotion ==
A teaser trailer for the film was released online on 2 June 2011, (previously being attached to certain domestic and international films), featuring a cover of Led Zeppelin's "Immigrant Song", by Reznor, Ross and Karen O (from the Yeah Yeah Yeahs).

On 10 August, the film's official website was updated to feature background music "She Reminds Me of You", under the filename "Dotcom.mp3". As was the case with "Hand Covers Bruise" from The Social Network's official site, this backing music was the first piece from the score to be available for listening.

A full-length trailer for the film was released on 22 September, featuring music from the score again, the first time the score had been specifically set to footage. Specifically the track "An Itch."

One track from the score ("What If We Could?") has been performed live by Reznor's band Nine Inch Nails on their Twenty Thirteen Tour in summer 2013.

== Packaging ==
The album's art was created by Nine Inch Nails and How to Destroy Angels' creative director Rob Sheridan and Neil Kellerhouse.

== Release ==
The Girl with the Dragon Tattoo was opened for pre-orders online on 2 December 2011, on Reznor's independent label website Null Corporation in a number of different formats at various price points. The digital copy was released on 9 December, whilst retail copies of the album were distributed by Mute Records on 27 December in CD format followed by the "Deluxe" edition on 6 February. The smallest Dragon Tattoo package contains the entire album in 320 kbit/s MP3 format made available for download directly from the website for US$12. A lossless digital version includes a choice of Apple Lossless or FLAC for US$14. A standard physical version is available for US$14 and includes three audio CDs stored in an eight panel digipak with custom "ice" slipcase and a six panel insert, alongside a digital version delivered in 320 kbit/s MP3. A $300 "Deluxe Edition" includes a 6-LP 180 gram vinyl set in a deluxe book package with metal cover in a hard plastic "ice" slip cover, an exclusive custom 8 GB metal razor blade USB pendant (inspired by Lisbeth Salander (Rooney Mara)'s razor blade necklace) containing the full album in high-fidelity 96k audio, a fold-out poster designed by Neil Kellerhouse, and a HD digital copy in either Apple Lossless, FLAC, or 320 kbit/s MP3 formats.

On the day of the six-track sampler's launch, Reznor posted about the release on the Nine Inch Nails website:

For the last fourteen months Atticus and I have been hard at work on David Fincher's The Girl with the Dragon Tattoo. We laughed, we cried, we lost our minds and in the process made some of the most beautiful and disturbing music of our careers. The result is a sprawling three-hour opus that I am happy to announce is available for pre-order right now for as low as $11.99. The full release will be available in one week - December 9th. [...] Atticus and I are very proud of the film and our work, we hope you enjoy.

== Reception ==
=== Critical reception ===
Professional ratings
Aggregate scores
Source	Rating
Metacritic	76/100
Review scores
Source	Rating
AllMusic	4/5 stars
The A.V. Club	B
Consequence of Sound	4/5 stars
Filmtracks	1/5 stars
The Los Angeles Times	3.5/4 stars
The New York Times	(favorable)
The Philadelphia Inquirer	3.5/5 stars
Pitchfork	7.0/10
Rolling Stone	3/5 stars
The Salt Lake Tribune	B

Critical response to the score was generally favorable, with an average rating of 76% based on 11 professional reviews on Metacritic. Christian Cottingham of Drowned in Sound noticed that, "like the film the soundtrack favours atmosphere over cheap thrill, taking its time to mount a sense of rising dread, layers of drone building overtop machinery echo and worn piano faded between scattered melodies and sparse percussion. In isolation it's an accompaniment to 3am melancholy or the onset of madness: in context it's Fincher's bleached out whites and blacks and murky greens turned to sound, bleaker than their previous work and more ambitious even than NIN's Ghosts." Cottingham asserted that Dragon Tattoo, "most(ly) recalls Reznor's soundtrack for Quake in the late 1990s, where space and silence played a role as great as any multitrack in conveying tension and unsettling the mood. At times tender but mostly pretty terrifying, this needs to be heard somewhere loud, and preferably with an exit in easy reach."

Conversely, professional film music critics like Christian Clemmensen, of Filmtracks, and Jonathan Broxton, of Movie Music UK, dismissed it entirely, the latter considering the score as: "little more than a series of ambient drones, overlaid with various industrial sound effects and staccato rhythms – de-tuned piano chords, plucked bass notes, and the like." He also stated: "When the score isn't jarringly distracting, it's virtually inaudible or indistinguishable from the film's sound effects, begging the question of why the music is there in the first place."

=== Accolades ===
Date of ceremony	Award	Category	Recipient(s)	Result
5 December 2011	Washington D.C. Area Film Critics Association Awards	Best Score	Trent Reznor, Atticus Ross	Nominated
19 December 2011	Chicago Film Critics Association Awards	Best Original Score	Trent Reznor, Atticus Ross	Nominated
19 December 2011	St. Louis Gateway Film Critics Association Awards	Best Music	Trent Reznor, Atticus Ross	Nominated
19 December 2011	St. Louis Gateway Film Critics Association Awards	Best Scene	Opening credits ("Immigrant Song")	Won
10 January 2012	Alliance of Women Film Journalists Awards 2011	Best Film Music or Score	Trent Reznor, Atticus Ross	Won
12 January 2012	Broadcast Film Critics Association Awards	Best Composer	Trent Reznor, Atticus Ross	Nominated
15 January 2012	Golden Globe Awards	Best Original Score	Trent Reznor, Atticus Ross	Nominated
12 February 2012	BAFTA Awards	Best Original Music	Trent Reznor, Atticus Ross	Nominated
10 February 2013	Grammy Awards	Best Score Soundtrack for Visual Media	Trent Reznor, Atticus Ross	Won

== Track listing ==
All tracks are written by Trent Reznor and Atticus Ross, except where noted.

Disc 1
No.	Title	Writer(s)	Played when	Length
1.	"Immigrant Song" (featuring Karen O)	Jimmy Page, Robert Plant	Title credits.	2:47
2.	"She Reminds Me of You"		Blomkvist visits Hedestad.	4:25
3.	"People Lie All the Time"		Blomkvist begins looking at files.	4:10
4.	"Pinned and Mounted"		Salander identifies a murderer.	5:04
5.	"Perihelion"			6:01
6.	"What If We Could?"		Salander sees Blomkvist with Erika.	4:08
7.	"With the Flies"		Bjurman coerces Salander in his office, and later in his house.	7:41
8.	"Hidden in Snow"		Henrik explains Harriet's disappearance. Blomkvist and Salander investigate.	5:19
9.	"A Thousand Details"			3:58
10.	"One Particular Moment"		Salander speaks with Blomkvist about her father.	7:00
11.	"I Can't Take It Anymore"		Henrik receives another flower.	1:48
12.	"How Brittle the Bones"		Henrik shows Blomkvist the flowers.	1:49
13.	"Please Take Your Hand Away"			6:00
Total length:				60:10

Disc 2
No.	Title	Played when	Length
1.	"Cut into Pieces"		4:03
2.	"The Splinter"		2:32
3.	"An Itch"		4:09
4.	"Hypomania"		5:47
5.	"Under the Midnight Sun"	Salander discusses with the doctor. Martin discusses Harriet. Anita explains what happened that day.	7:01
6.	"Aphelion"	Blomkvist discovers the bible verses. Martin shows Blomkvist his house.	3:33
7.	"You're Here"	Blomkvist discovers Harriet in the photograph.	3:29
8.	"The Same as the Others"		3:08
9.	"A Pause for Reflection"	Blomkvist moves to Hedestad.	4:11
10.	"While Waiting"	Blomkvist asks for the honeymoon photographs.	2:17
11.	"The Seconds Drag"		4:33
12.	"Later into the Night"		4:55
13.	"Parallel Timeline with Alternate Outcome"		6:32
Total length:			56:10

Disc 3
No.	Title	Writer(s)	Played when	Length
1.	"Another Way of Caring"			7:02
2.	"A Viable Construct"			3:14
3.	"Revealed in the Thaw"			2:47
4.	"Millennia"			1:19
5.	"We Could Wait Forever"		Salander speaks with Frode, and later Bjurman.	4:21
6.	"Oraculum"			8:21
7.	"Great Bird of Prey"		Blomkvist is shot at. Salander chases a car.	5:19
8.	"The Heretics"		Salander travels across Europe.	5:20
9.	"A Pair of Doves"		Vanger invests in Millenium.	2:02
10.	"Infiltrator"		Salander wiretaps Anita.	7:03
11.	"The Sound of Forgetting"			2:30
12.	"Of Secrets"		Blomkvist discovers Harriet's reaction in the photographs.	3:25
13.	"Is Your Love Strong Enough?" (performed by How to Destroy Angels)	Bryan Ferry		4:30
Total length:				57:14

=== Six Track Sampler ===
Cover of the Six Track Sampler

All tracks are written by Trent Reznor and Atticus Ross.

No.	Title	Length
1.	"Hidden in Snow"	5:19
2.	"People Lie All the Time"	4:08
3.	"What If We Could?"	3:59
4.	"Oraculum"	8:16
5.	"Please Take Your Hand Away"	5:53
6.	"Under the Midnight Sun"	6:59
Total length:		34:34

=== Award FYC album ===
An alternate album For Your Consideration (FYC) was sent by Sony Pictures to awarding bodies. It features the actual film cues, which have alternate titles, edits and mixes from the versions on the commercially available soundtrack, along with one composition not on the soundtrack release at all.

All tracks are written by Trent Reznor and Atticus Ross.

Disc 1
No.	Title	Length
1.	"I Can't Take It Anymore"	1:18
2.	"Salander Goes Home" (She Reminds Me of You)	1:56
3.	"Morrel's Report" (People Lie All the Time)	2:10
4.	"Heartbreak" (What If We Could?)	2:41
5.	"Salander / Cecilia / Harald" (Hidden in Snow)	2:56
6.	"Värmland" (Please Take Your Hand Away)	4:54
7.	"Maps" (The Seconds Drag)	1:43
8.	"Bjurman BJ" (With the Flies)	3:19
9.	"Salander Returns to the House" (One Particular Moment)	1:53
10.	"Archives" (Pinned and Mounted)	2:45
11.	"Coffee Cup" (The Seconds Drag)	0:52
12.	"Martin's Story" (Under the Midnight Sun)	1:25
13.	"Martin Traps Blomkvist" (Aphelion)	2:24
14.	"Car Chase" (Great Bird of Prey)	2:04
15.	"Harriet Theme 4" (While Waiting)	0:57
16.	"Salander's Trip" (The Heretics)	3:48
17.	"North Pole" (A Pause for Reflection)	0:48
18.	"Media Event of the Year" (One Particular Moment)	0:43
19.	"Harriet's Story" (Under the Midnight Sun)	4:05
20.	"Bank Sequence" (The Heretics)	1:15
21.	"Harriet Theme 1" (Millennia)	2:33
22.	"Salander Tattoos Bjurman" (Of Secrets)	2:26
Total length:		48:44

Disc 2
No.	Title	Length
1.	"Millennia"	1:37
2.	"She's One of the Best, She's Different" (We Could Wait Forever)	2:44
3.	"Parade Photos" (You're Here)	1:54
4.	"Bible Verses" (Aphelion)	1:59
5.	"Plague, Trinity & Wasp" (Infiltrator)	1:59
6.	"Salander Arrives at Bjurman's" (Cut into Pieces)	1:40
7.	"Salander Reports to Blomkvist" (Aphelion)	1:43
8.	"Salander at Wennerström's Apartment" (People Lie All the Time)	1:02
9.	"Blomkvist Shot" (Great Bird of Prey)	1:06
10.	"Lovemaking" (What If We Could?)	1:41
11.	"Harriet's Flowers" (How Brittle the Bones)	1:34
12.	"Harriet / The Accident" (Hidden in Snow)	2:38
13.	"Salander at Söder Hospital" (Under the Midnight Sun)	0:48
14.	"Meeting Bjurman" (We Could Wait Forever)	1:07
15.	"Salander Raped" (With the Flies)	2:05
16.	"Salander Tasers Bjurman" (You're Here)	1:16
17.	"Martin Interviews Blomkvist" (Great Bird of Prey)	2:57
18.	"Blomkvist Meets Martin" (misprint on the packaging, "Martin" should be "Henrik")	1:16
19.	"Blomkvist Travels to Hedestad (misspelled Hedestadt)" (She Reminds Me of You)	1:53
20.	"Widow Brännlund's Photos" (Hidden in Snow)	1:18
21.	"Dead Cat" (Perihelion)	0:38
Total length:		34:32

The same album was made available on the Sony Pictures FYC site as of 6 February 2012. Here, it was presented in chronological order from the film, and did not feature the Led Zeppelin cover performed by Trent Reznor and Karen O:

All tracks are written by Trent Reznor and Atticus Ross.

No.	Title	Length
1.	"I Can't Take It Anymore"	1:18
2.	"Media Event of the Year" (One Particular Moment)	0:43
3.	"She's One of the Best, She's Different" (We Could Wait Forever)	2:44
4.	"Salander at Wennerström's Apartment" (People Lie All the Time)	1:02
5.	"Blomkvist Travels to Hedestad (misspelled Hedestadt)" (She Reminds Me of You)	1:53
6.	"Blomkvist Meets Henrik"	1:16
7.	"Harriet / The Accident" (Hidden in Snow)	2:38
8.	"Harriet's Flowers" (How Brittle the Bones)	1:34
9.	"North Pole" (A Pause for Reflection)	0:48
10.	"Salander at Söder Hospital" (Under the Midnight Sun)	0:48
11.	"Morrel's Report" (People Lie All the Time)	2:10
12.	"Meeting Bjurman" (We Could Wait Forever)	1:07
13.	"Martin's Story" (Under the Midnight Sun)	1:25
14.	"Bjurman BJ" (With the Flies)	3:19
15.	"Salander Arrives at Bjurman's" (Cut into Pieces)	1:40
16.	"Salander Raped" (With the Flies)	2:05
17.	"Salander Goes Home" (She Reminds Me of You)	1:56
18.	"Millennia"	1:37
19.	"Parade Photos" (You're Here)	1:54
20.	"Salander Tasers Bjurman" (You're Here)	1:16
21.	"Salander Tattoos Bjurman" (Of Secrets)	2:26
22.	"Bible Verses" (Aphelion)	1:59
23.	"Värmland" (Please Take Your Hand Away)	4:54
24.	"Salander Reports to Blomkvist" (Aphelion)	1:43
25.	"Dead Cat" (Perihelion)	0:38
26.	"Harriet Theme 1" (While Waiting)	0:58
27.	"Widow Brännlund's Photos" (Hidden in Snow)	1:18
28.	"Blomkvist Shot" (Great Bird of Prey)	1:06
29.	"Lovemaking" (What If We Could?)	1:41
30.	"Salander / Cecilia / Harald" (Hidden in Snow)	2:56
31.	"Maps" (The Seconds Drag)	1:43
32.	"Archives" (Pinned and Mounted)	2:45
33.	"Coffee Cup" (The Seconds Drag)	0:52
34.	"Martin Traps Blomkvist" (Aphelion)	2:24
35.	"Martin Interviews Blomkvist" (Great Bird of Prey)	2:57
36.	"Car Chase" (Great Bird of Prey)	2:04
37.	"Salander Returns to the House" (One Particular Moment)	1:53
38.	"Harriet Theme 4" (While Waiting)	2:33
39.	"Plague, Trinity & Wasp" (Infiltrator)	1:59
40.	"Harriet's Story" (Under the Midnight Sun)	4:05
41.	"Salander's Trip" (The Heretics)	3:48
42.	"Bank Sequence" (The Heretics)	1:15
43.	"Heartbreak" (What If We Could?)	2:41

== Personnel ==
Credits for The Girl with the Dragon Tattoo adapted from liner notes:

- Trent Reznor and Atticus Ross – composition, arrangements, performance, programming, and production
- Karen O – vocals (1)
- Mariqueen Maandig – vocals (11, 23, 30, 35, 39)
- How to Destroy Angels – performance (39)
- Blumpy – engineer
- Alan Moulder – mixing (1, 3, 5, 6, 8, 11, 13, 14, 16, 17, 18, 21, 23, 24, 25, 26, 29, 30, 33, 35, 38, 39)
- Michael Patterson – mixing (2, 4, 7, 9, 10, 12, 15, 19, 20, 22, 27, 28, 31, 32, 36, 37)
- Rob Sheridan – art direction
- Neil Kellerhouse – artwork and GDT typeface
- Jean-Baptiste Mondino – photography
- Tom Baker (at Precision Mastering, Hollywood, CA) – mastering
- David Fincher – executive producer
- Scott Rudin – executive producer
- Lia Vollack (for Columbia Pictures) – executive in charge of music
- Paul Kremen – consultant
- Rebel Waltz, Inc. – Trent Reznor and Null management
- Ren Klyce, Ceán Chaffin, Claudia Sarne, Susan Bonds, Alex Lieu, 42 Entertainment, Daniel Miller, Tim Ahlering, Raul Perez, Shelly Bunge, Andrea McKee, Brett Bachemein, Angela Sidlow, Larry Kohorn, Tara-Beaudine-Moore, Valerie Caton, Neil Ross, Fred de Jong, Michelle Jubelirer, Don Kennedy, Arif Mahmud, Gary Stiffleman, David Byrnes, Irina Volodarsky, Doug Mark, Paul Friedman, Tony Ciulla and Laura Haber – special thanks

== Charts ==
=== Album ===
Chart (2012)	Peak position
Australian Hitseekers Albums (ARIA)	15
Austrian Albums (Ö3 Austria)	71
Belgian Albums (Ultratop Flanders)	73
Belgian Albums (Ultratop Wallonia)	97
UK Albums (Official Charts)	199
UK Soundtrack Albums (Official Charts)	4
US Billboard 200	44
US Independent Albums (Billboard)	4
US Soundtrack Albums (Billboard)	3
US Top Alternative Albums (Billboard)	10
US Top Rock Albums (Billboard)	11

=== Singles ===
Year	Song	US Heat	UK Rock
2011	"Immigrant Song" (Karen O with Trent Reznor and Atticus Ross)	14	4
2011	"Is Your Love Strong Enough?" (How to Destroy Angels)	—	—

== In popular media ==
- Parts of the tracks "Pinned and Mounted", "Hidden in Snow", and "What If We Could?" were used in the 2012 pilot episode of the TV series Elementary.
