= The Social Network (soundtrack) =

Film score by Trent Reznor and Atticus Ross
- Released: September 28, 2010
- Recorded: 2010 in Los Angeles, California
- Genres: Electronic; dark ambient; electro-industrial; chiptune; experimental
- Length: 66:07
- Label: Null
- Producers: Trent Reznor; Atticus Ross

Trent Reznor and Atticus Ross chronology
The Social Network (2010)	The Girl with the Dragon Tattoo (2011)

The Social Network is the score album for David Fincher's 2010 film of the same name, composed by Trent Reznor and Atticus Ross. It was released on September 28, 2010, through The Null Corporation. On September 17, a five-track sampler was also made available for free. The score bears a similar sound to the previous Reznor/Ross 2008 collaboration, Ghosts I–IV, and even features two slightly reworked tracks from Ghosts; the track "Magnetic" (reworked from "14 Ghosts II") and "A Familiar Taste" (a remixed version of "35 Ghosts IV").

The soundtrack received positive reviews from critics, and widespread acclaim across the film industry. The score won nine major awards, including the 2010 Golden Globe award for Best Original Score – Motion Picture, and the Academy Award for Best Original Score at the 83rd Academy Awards.

== Background ==
When Trent Reznor was originally asked by director David Fincher to score The Social Network, he initially declined, partly due to just finishing up a long touring and recording schedule. After further reflection, Reznor apologized and told Fincher to keep him in consideration, to which he told Reznor that he had been waiting for him to accept.

On July 1, 2010, Reznor publicly announced that he and Ross were taking part in the soundtrack on nin.com:

I was planning on taking some time off after the continual waves of touring that ended last fall and spend this year experimenting around with what would become How to Destroy Angels and some new NIN. Well, that plan didn't work out so well. David Fincher started inquiring about my interest in scoring his upcoming film, The Social Network. Yeah, the movie about the founding of Facebook. I've always loved David's work but quite honestly I wondered what would draw him to tell that story. When I actually read the script and realized what he was up to, I said goodbye to that free time I had planned. Atticus Ross and I have been on a creative roll so I asked him if he wanted to work on this with me and we signed on.

Months later, I'm happy to tell you we're nearing the completion of this and I couldn't be happier with how it's turned out. The level of excellence that David operates on is inspiring and the entire process has been challenging and truly enjoyable.

As Atticus and I near the end of the scoring process, we're looking forward to the next phase - distilling the large amount of music we've written for this down to a satisfying record (or two). The film opens Oct 1 in the US with the record likely available a couple of weeks ahead of that.

Speaking of the film... it's really fucking good. And dark!

The film initially had a "John Hughes vibe", which concerned Reznor at first, but after meeting with Fincher and trying out different ideas with Atticus Ross, it turned out to work a lot more smoothly after all. Reznor recalled, "The whole process was fun for me because I liked answering to someone I respect and not having to make all the decisions for a change." Reznor and Ross would try sketches of songs, figuring they would have to revise it eventually, only for Fincher to get back to them and say, "I don't have anything bad to say – that's never happened before."

The idea of recording "In the Hall of the Mountain King" came from a scene at the Henley Royal Regatta and trying to find a song that would match up with its Edwardian era garden party theme. Fincher told them to try a Wendy Carlos version of it, which Reznor admits "threw [him] for a loop" and says it took four weeks to work on.

== Packaging ==
The album's art was created by Nine Inch Nails' creative director Rob Sheridan, based upon the designs used to promote the film, mixed with Sheridan's style of image distortion. He explained the ideas, techniques and methods that made up the compositions that were used for the physical release:

For The Social Network soundtrack art, my goal was to walk the line between representing the film and creating something that stood as a piece of art on its own, much as the soundtrack itself does.

For the cover, I needed to represent the branding of the film, but neither Trent nor I wanted the photo of Jesse Eisenberg to be the cover as directly as it was in the film's poster. By blurring out the photo and placing the title text over Eisenberg's eyes, I was able to create a cover that evoked the film's branding while distancing itself from it at the same time. The style of fonts used in the film and its marketing were something Trent and I both really liked, so we preserved that for the soundtrack.

For the internal art, Sony gave me a batch of publicity stills from the film to utilize if I wanted. By their nature none of them were particularly artistic, and I wasn't sure how useful they'd be for the artwork. Trent expressed an interest in creating a package that could stand on its own whether or not listeners had seen the film. Given that we conceded a bit on the album cover, he said "let's make the inside packaging weird."

An early idea I had was to digitally corrupt the images we had from the film, combining a "glitch art" visual aesthetic I've always been interested in with a metaphor for digital images shared on Facebook, the corruption they're susceptible to, and the corruption portrayed in the film. This idea resonated with Trent, so I began experimenting with different ways to destroy the publicity stills Sony had sent me.

Whereas in previous projects (especially With Teeth and Year Zero) I'd used careful manual processes to create digital glitches, this time I actually destroyed images by opening them up in a text editor and adding/removing text to their raw code.

It was a very experimental, trial-and-error process - I tried different file types, different rendering methods (for example, damaged Photoshop files render much more interestingly in OSX's Preview than in Photoshop itself), and different types of text injected into the image files (I grabbed random paragraphs of text from around the web - ridiculous fan-fiction sites were a fun source). These images were distorted through manual editing of the image files in a text editor, not through intricate Photoshop work.

The CD, Blu-ray, and vinyl editions of the album all utilize slightly different artwork elements.

== Release ==
The first track from the soundtrack, "Hand Covers Bruise (No Piano)" debuted on The Social Network's website on August 30, 2010, streaming in the background. The album was released by The Null Corporation and distributed by Sony Music.

A five-track sampler for the album was released on September 17, on The Null Corporation's homepage.

On the day of the five-track sampler's launch, Reznor posted about the release on the Null Corporation's site:

This is what Atticus and I have been working on for the last few months. We had a great time working with David Fincher on this and the film turned out excellent - something we're very proud of. It opens in theaters Oct 1 and you should check it out.

Musically, this all came out of our secret laboratory - electronic in basis, but mostly organic sounding. Lots of experiments and emphasis on sound fraying around the edges while focusing on the proper emotional tone for the various scenes.

Regarding the purchase options, sorry about the "clunkiness" of not offering the full record digital download pre-sale (and having to visit Amazon). My agenda was to be able to offer this for the lowest possible price and this was the best way to achieve that. Amazon has been a great partner with past projects and I appreciate your understanding.

The album was released for digital download on September 28, exclusively on Amazon MP3, and is available in three physical formats: CD, Blu-ray 5.1 surround audio and 2x12" vinyl record, released on October 11, 18 and 25 respectively. It was the first release from The Null Corporation to be marked with a Null number, being Null 01 – a direct homage to the Nine Inch Nails halo numbers catalog system. For the tenth anniversary of the release, a Dolby Atmos mix was made available.

Every song in the film is on the soundtrack, with the exception of "Ball and Biscuit" by the White Stripes, "California über alles" by Dead Kennedys, "2 Ghosts I" by Nine Inch Nails, "Baby, You're a Rich Man" by The Beatles, "Like a Bad Girl Should" by The Cramps and "The Sound of Violence" by Dennis De Laat.

== Promotion ==
On the album's official Facebook page, a five-day promotion for the movie was created on September 22, offering fans the chance to remix "On We March" and "In Motion" to win a chance to meet Ross and Reznor in Los Angeles, along with a seat at the film's première. The pair have since announced that they've planned for a remix EP to be released containing the best fan remixes, and that many more multitracks would be released for the purpose. However, neither the remix EP nor the additional multitracks came to fruition.

== Reception ==
=== Critical reception ===
Professional ratings
Aggregate scores
Source	Rating
Metacritic	76/100
Review scores
Source	Rating
AllMusic	4/5 stars
Consequence of Sound	4/5 stars
Film Music Magazine	A−
Filmtracks	0/5 stars
Kerrang!	4/5
Lost at Sea	8.8/10
Movie Music UK	3.5/5 stars
The Music Cycle	5/5 stars
Pitchfork	8.7/10
PopMatters	7/10 stars
Rolling Stone	3/5 stars

Critical response to the score was generally favorable, with an average rating of 76 out of 100 based on five professional reviews on Metacritic. The score debuted the following week at number one on the U.S. Billboard Soundtrack chart, and was largely well received by critics. David from The Music Cycle awarded it five stars, four stars from AllMusic and Kerrang!, three-and-a-half stars from Movie Music UK, and three stars from Rolling Stone. Roger Ebert wrote positively of the score, calling it an "urgent composition that drove the film's headlong momentum". Adam Spunberg of Picktainment noted "how seamlessly it corresponds with the tenor of the film. Scene for scene, this smorgasbord of tracks fully encapsulates Mark Zuckerberg's – and Aaron Sorkin's – vision"; he commended the score for its "profound simplicity atop [the] turbulent background, whilst giving inventive modernity to other settings" and for portraying "Zuckerberg the genius, developing a brilliant idea over ominous undertones".

Much less enthusiastic was Christian Clemmensen, member of the International Film Music Critics Association and editor of Filmtracks, who said the score was "as redundantly insufferable as any score in recent memory, with no standout cues, no beginning, no end, no suspense, no adversity, and, most importantly, no sense of accomplishment". He awarded the score the very rare rating of FRISBEE, the lowest Filmtracks rating.

=== Accolades ===
Date of ceremony	Award	Category	Result
December 6, 2010	Washington D.C. Area Film Critics Association Awards 2010	Best Score	Nominated
December 12, 2010	Boston Society of Film Critics Awards 2010	Best Use of Music in Film	Won
December 12, 2010	Los Angeles Film Critics Association Awards 2010	Best Music/Score	Won
December 14, 2010	San Diego Film Critics Society Awards 2010	Best Score	Nominated
December 16, 2010	Las Vegas Film Critics Society Awards 2010	Best Score	Won
December 18, 2010	Houston Film Critics Society Awards 2010	Best Original Score	Nominated
December 19, 2010	Satellite Awards 2010	Best Original Score	Nominated
December 20, 2010	Chicago Film Critics Association Awards 2010	Best Original Score	Nominated
December 20, 2010	St. Louis Gateway Film Critics Association Awards 2010	Best Music (Soundtrack or Score)	Won
January 6, 2011	Central Ohio Film Critics Association: Awards 2010	Best Score	Nominated
January 10, 2011	Alliance of Women Film Journalists Awards 2010	Best Film Music or Score	Won
January 14, 2011	Broadcast Film Critics Association Awards 2010	Best Score	Won
January 14, 2011	Denver Film Critics Society Awards 2010	Best Original Score	Nominated
January 16, 2011	68th Golden Globe Awards	Best Original Score – Motion Picture	Won
February 27, 2011	83rd Academy Awards	Best Original Score	Won

== Track listing ==
=== CD version ===
All tracks are written by Trent Reznor and Atticus Ross, except where noted.

No.	Title	Length
1.	"Hand Covers Bruise"	4:18
2.	"In Motion" (Accidentally received the note 'interpolation of 35 Ghosts IV', which was intended for "A Familiar Taste")	4:56
3.	"A Familiar Taste"	3:35
4.	"It Catches Up with You"	1:39
5.	"Intriguing Possibilities"	4:24
6.	"Painted Sun in Abstract"	3:29
7.	"3:14 Every Night"	4:03
8.	"Pieces Form the Whole"	4:16
9.	"Carbon Prevails"	3:53
10.	"Eventually We Find Our Way"	4:17
11.	"Penetration"	1:14
12.	"In the Hall of the Mountain King" (Edvard Grieg)	2:21
13.	"On We March"	4:14
14.	"Magnetic"	2:10
15.	"Almost Home"	3:33
16.	"Hand Covers Bruise, Reprise"	1:52
17.	"Complication with Optimistic Outcome"	3:19
18.	"The Gentle Hum of Anxiety"	3:53
19.	"Soft Trees Break the Fall"	4:44
Total length:		66:10

=== Vinyl version ===
All tracks are written by Trent Reznor and Atticus Ross, except where noted.

Disc 1 Side A
No.	Title	Length
1.	"Hand Covers Bruise"	4:18
2.	"In Motion" (This is mislabeled as an "interpolation of 35 Ghosts IV" – the actual track is A Familiar Taste)	4:56
3.	"A Familiar Taste"	3:35
4.	"It Catches Up with You"	1:39
5.	"Intriguing Possibilities"	4:24
Total length:		18:52

Disc 1 Side B
No.	Title	Length
6.	"Painted Sun in Abstract"	3:29
7.	"3:14 Every Night"	4:03
8.	"Pieces Form the Whole"	4:16
9.	"Carbon Prevails"	3:53
10.	"Eventually We Find Our Way"	4:17
Total length:		19:58

Disc 2 Side A
No.	Title	Length
11.	"Penetration"	1:14
12.	"In the Hall of the Mountain King" (Edvard Grieg)	2:21
13.	"On We March"	4:14
14.	"Magnetic"	2:10
Total length:		9:59

Disc 2 Side B
No.	Title	Length
15.	"Almost Home"	3:33
16.	"Hand Covers Bruise, Reprise"	1:52
17.	"Complication with Optimistic Outcome"	3:19
18.	"The Gentle Hum of Anxiety"	3:53
19.	"Soft Trees Break the Fall"	4:44
Total length:		17:21

=== Five Track Sampler ===
All tracks are written by Trent Reznor and Atticus Ross.

No.	Title	Length
1.	"Pieces Form the Whole"	4:25
2.	"Eventually We Find Our Way"	4:17
3.	"On We March"	4:18
4.	"The Gentle Hum of Anxiety"	3:51
5.	"Soft Trees Break the Fall"	4:39
Total length:		21:29

=== Award Sampler ===
A sampler released for consideration by awarding bodies gave a different track listing and many alternate titles, edits and mixes to the commercially available soundtrack, along with one track not on the previous soundtrack release.

All tracks are written by Trent Reznor and Atticus Ross.

No.	Title	Length
1.	"Main Title Sequence" (Hand Covers Bruise)	3:31
2.	"Let the Hacking Begin" (In Motion)	3:21
3.	"Cocksucker" (It Catches Up with You)	1:45
4.	"In Evidence" (Intriguing Possibilities)	4:07
5.	"Does She Have a Boyfriend?" (Painted Sun in Abstract)	2:52
6.	"Zuckerberg Stole Our Website" (3:14 Every Night)	0:47
7.	"Family of Means" (Pieces Form the Whole)	1:59
8.	"What Are We Doing About This?" (Hand Covers Bruise, Reprise)	1:56
9.	"Bathroom Sex" (Eventually We Find Our Way)	3:05
10.	"Violation of Harvard Law" (3:14 Every Night)	0:46
11.	"Trip to N.Y." (Penetration)	1:08
12.	"Dinner with Sean"	0:59
13.	"Bank of America" (Almost Home)	1:20
14.	"Who's Eduardo Saverin?" (3:14 Every Night)	0:40
15.	"Fire in My Apartment" (On We March)	1:49
16.	"What Were the Shares Diluted Down to?" (Hand Covers Bruise)	2:20
17.	"Something's Happened" (The Gentle Hum of Anxiety)	2:18
18.	"Soft Trees Break the Fall"	4:34
Total length:		39:10

== Personnel ==
Credits for The Social Network adapted from liner notes:

- Trent Reznor and Atticus Ross – composition, arrangements, performance, programming, and production
- Adrian Belew – additional guitar (3, 14) {Ghosts I–IV: 35 Ghosts IV, 14 Ghosts II}
- Edvard Grieg – composition (on "In the Hall of the Mountain King")
- Blumpy – engineer
- Michael Patterson – mixing
- Rob Sheridan – design
- Tom Baker (at Precision Mastering, Hollywood, CA) – mastering
- David Fincher – executive producer
- Lia Vollack (for Columbia Pictures) – executive in charge of music
- Rebel Waltz, Inc. – Trent Reznor and Null management
- First Artists Management – Atticus Ross management

== Chart positions ==
Chart (2010)	Peak position
US Billboard 200	20
US Billboard Rock Albums	6
US Billboard Top Digital Albums	3
US Billboard Top Independent Albums	2
US Billboard Top Alternative Albums	3
US Billboard Top Soundtracks	1
