= Welcome Oblivion =

- Cover of the vinyl edition

Studio album by How to Destroy Angels
- Released: March 5, 2013
- Genre: Electronic rock
- Length: 65:32 (standard edition); 75:03 (vinyl edition); 93:21 (w/ iTunes bonus disc)
- Label: Columbia
- Producer: How to Destroy Angels

How to Destroy Angels chronology
An Omen EP (2012)	Welcome Oblivion (2013)

Sigil numbers chronology
Sigil 03 (2012)	Sigil 04 (2013)

Singles from Welcome Oblivion
- 1. "How Long?" Released: January 31, 2013

Professional ratings
Aggregate scores
Source	Rating
Metacritic	73/100
Review scores
Source	Rating
AllMusic	4/5 stars
Consequence of Sound	3/5 stars
Los Angeles Times	2.5/5 stars
NME	4/5 stars
Pitchfork	6.2/10
Toronto Star	3/4 stars

Welcome Oblivion is the debut studio album by American post-industrial group How to Destroy Angels. It was released on March 5, 2013, on Columbia Records. It was described as "sensual electronic rock" by the Los Angeles Times.

== Promotion ==
The release date for the album was announced on January 10, 2013, via the band's official blog. The album cover for the vinyl edition and the track list was announced on January 31, 2013. The iTunes version of the album included the six tracks that made up the band's first EP, How to Destroy Angels, as bonus tracks.

The music video for "How Long?", directed by London-based art collective Shynola, was released on January 31, 2013.

The album was posted for streaming in its entirety on Pitchfork on February 19, 2013.

== Formats ==
The album was released on both CD and vinyl editions, with different artworks for each. The vinyl version also contained two extra tracks, "The Province of Fear" and "Unintended Consequences", as well as a slightly different running order. These songs were also included on a white label CD that accompanied the vinyl copy.

== Track listing ==
All tracks are written by Trent Reznor, Mariqueen Maandig and Atticus Ross, except "We Fade Away" by Trent Reznor, Mariqueen Maandig, Atticus Ross, and Alessandro Cortini.

CD and digital editions
No.	Title	Length
1.	"The Wake-Up"	1:43
2.	"Keep It Together"	4:27
3.	"And the Sky Began to Scream"	3:57
4.	"Welcome Oblivion"	3:46
5.	"Ice Age"	6:53
6.	"On the Wing"	4:52
7.	"Too Late, All Gone"	6:15
8.	"How Long?"	3:54
9.	"Strings and Attractors"	4:28
10.	"We Fade Away"	6:41
11.	"Recursive Self-Improvement"	6:28
12.	"The Loop Closes"	4:50
13.	"Hallowed Ground"	7:18
Total length:		65:32

iTunes bonus disc
No.	Title	Length
1.	"The Space In Between"	3:35
2.	"Parasite"	5:05
3.	"Fur-Lined"	4:00
4.	"BBB"	3:31
5.	"The Believers"	5:36
6.	"A Drowning"	7:02
Total length:		27:49

Vinyl edition
No.	Title	Length
1.	"The Wake-Up"	1:43
2.	"Keep It Together"	4:27
3.	"And the Sky Began to Scream"	3:57
4.	"Ice Age"	6:53
5.	"Welcome Oblivion"	3:46
6.	"On the Wing"	4:52
7.	"Too Late, All Gone"	6:15
8.	"The Province of Fear"	4:13
9.	"How Long?"	3:54
10.	"Strings and Attractors"	4:28
11.	"Recursive Self-Improvement"	6:28
12.	"Unintended Consequences"	5:18
13.	"We Fade Away"	6:41
14.	"The Loop Closes"	4:50
15.	"Hallowed Ground"	7:18
Total length:		75:03

== Personnel ==
The album personnel, as adapted from the liner notes:

Written, arranged, produced, programmed, performed and packaged by
How to Destroy Angels

- Mariqueen Maandig
- Trent Reznor
- Atticus Ross
- Rob Sheridan

Other personnel

- Alessandro Cortini – co-writing and performance on "We Fade Away"
- Alan Moulder – mixing
- Tom Baker – mastering
- Blumpy – recording
- Dustin Mosley – additional engineering
- Jun Murakawa – additional engineering
