= An Omen EP =

EP by How to Destroy Angels
- Released: November 13, 2012
- Recorded: 2011–12
- Genres: Post-industrial; electronica; trip hop; dark ambient
- Length: 32:33
- Label: Columbia
- Producers: Trent Reznor; Mariqueen Maandig; Atticus Ross

How to Destroy Angels chronology
How to Destroy Angels (2010)	An Omen EP (2012)	Welcome Oblivion (2013)

Sigil numbers chronology
Sigil 02 (2010)	Sigil 03 (2012)	Sigil 04 (2013)

Singles from An Omen EP
- 1. "Keep It Together" Released: October 9, 2012

An Omen EP (stylized as An omen EP_) is the second extended play release by American post-industrial group How to Destroy Angels, released November 13, 2012. Produced by Nine Inch Nails frontman Trent Reznor, his wife Mariqueen Maandig and longtime collaborator Atticus Ross, the EP contains various tracks later issued on their 2013 debut album, Welcome Oblivion. It focuses on Maandig's vocal style, with a lighter tone than its predecessor.

The full EP was released for streaming purposes on November 8, 2012, at The Hype Machine and the band's official SoundCloud channel, five days before the official release date, then was released in digital and vinyl formats afterwards. As with many of Reznor's official releases, it was designated with a unique name and number: An omen EP_ is "SIGIL 03".

The release was announced by Reznor in 2011, and initially slated for a November 2011 street date. However, due to Reznor's dissatisfaction with the output, it was put on hold until he felt it was up to standard, taking it on what he referred to as a "Mulholland Test Drive". The title was announced on September 22, 2012, as An Omen EP.

This was Reznor's first musical release (from either Nine Inch Nails or How to Destroy Angels) on Columbia Records, and his first non-independent release since Nine Inch Nails' Year Zero Remixed, which was released on Interscope.

== Promotion ==
The first single, "Keep It Together", was debuted on Zane Lowe's BBC Radio One show on October 8, 2012, and the track was released via digital download a day later.

=== Art direction ===
Artwork, graphics and promotional photos were conceived by the entire band, and primarily executed by Rob Sheridan. He used a technique of creating glitch art similar to his previous work with Nine Inch Nails, not with Photoshop effects, but instead by placing raw images onto analog VHS tapes, then disrupting those very signals and photographing distortion through a CRT monitor.

== Release ==
All versions were released on November 13, 2012.

- The EP was released in MP3 formats across all MP3 retailers, but the only way to obtain the high-quality and lossless audio formats for the release was to order through the band's own webstore.
- The EP was released on 12", 180-gram vinyl and that was the only way to obtain the album on a physical medium, as a CD copy of the EP was not pressed. When ordered through the band's webstore, initial copies came packaged with an exclusive 12" remix white label pressing of the EP's lead single "Keep It Together". This limited offer has since sold out.

== Reception ==
Professional ratings
Aggregate scores
Source	Rating
Metacritic	78/100
Review scores
Source	Rating
AllMusic	3.5/5 stars
Consequence of Sound	3/5 stars
CraveOnline	5/10 stars
KEXP-FM	(positive)
Los Angeles Times	3.5/4 stars
Ology	(B)
Pitchfork	(6.5/10)
The Plain Dealer	(positive)
Rolling Stone	4/5 stars

=== Critical reception ===
Critical response to the EP was generally favorable, with an average rating of 78% based on 11 professional reviews on Metacritic.

== Track listing ==
All tracks are written by Trent Reznor, Mariqueen Maandig and Atticus Ross

No.	Title	Length
1.	"Keep It Together"	4:29
2.	"Ice Age"	7:00
3.	"On the Wing"	4:54
4.	"The Sleep of Reason Produces Monsters"	4:25
5.	"The Loop Closes"	4:48
6.	"Speaking in Tongues"	7:00
Total length:		32:33

== Credits and personnel ==
Written, arranged, produced, programmed, performed and packaged by How to Destroy Angels

- Mariqueen Maandig
- Trent Reznor
- Atticus Ross
- Rob Sheridan

Production

- Alan Moulder – mixing
- Michael Patterson – mixing (4)
- Tom Baker – mastering (at Precision Mastering, Hollywood, CA)
- Blumpy – engineer
- Dustin Mosley – additional engineering
- Rob Sheridan – photography, art direction/post-production
- Tamar Levine – photography
- Rebel Waltz – management
- Marc Geiger – booking (WME)
- Heathcliff Beru – publicity (Life or Death PR)

== See also ==
- The Sleep of Reason Produces Monsters
