= Gone Girl (soundtrack) =

Film score by Trent Reznor and Atticus Ross
- Released: September 30, 2014
- Recorded: 2014
- Genre: Dark ambient
- Length: 86:42
- Label: Columbia
- Producers: Trent Reznor; Atticus Ross

Trent Reznor and Atticus Ross chronology
The Girl with the Dragon Tattoo (2011)	Gone Girl (2014)	Before the Flood (2016)

Gone Girl is the score album for David Fincher's 2014 film of the same name, composed by Trent Reznor and Atticus Ross. The album was released on September 30, 2014, through Columbia Records. It marks the third time that Reznor and Ross have collaborated with Fincher, following 2010's Oscar-winning The Social Network and 2011's The Girl with the Dragon Tattoo. The soundtrack was nominated for the 2015 Grammy Award for Best Compilation Soundtrack for Visual Media, and also for the 2014 Golden Globe Award for Best Original Score.

== Background and development ==
On January 21, 2014, Trent Reznor announced that he and Atticus Ross would provide the score, marking their third collaboration with David Fincher, following The Social Network (2010) and The Girl with the Dragon Tattoo (2011). Reznor revealed that the tonal inspiration for Gone Girl came from an unsettling experience of Fincher at the chiropractor's office and the music heard was "inauthentically trying to make him feel alright", and thus, had become a metaphor for the film score. The soundtrack's music mixes soothing sounds with staccato electronic noises.

Reznor had anticipated being able to focus intently on the Gone Girl soundtrack, but it turned out to overlap with a year-long tour with Nine Inch Nails. During multiple two-week breaks in his tour, Reznor and Ross would create musical soundscapes that both matched the scenes in the script as well as what Fincher exactly wanted. According to them, the track "Sugar Storm" from the soundtrack exemplifies a sound that begins with soothing, new-age massage therapy music, where the composers gradually introduce strange staccato noises that recall an old dial-up modem.

In the same interview to USA Today Reznor stated, "I love the sounds in David Lynch movies, the kind that make you lean forward in your seat and tense up." The staccato noise introduction was justified by him stating that if placing background of a song a choir of screams that creep slowly into one's head, he could create a feeling. Further, Reznor and Ross used traditional instruments like guitars and keyboard, as well as handmade gear. They created a device that when tapped made a stuttering beat sounds. Reznor was quoted saying, "So when you use that as a foundation for a track that has a sexy background, the core is inherently broken, and you sense that."

In an interview with Rolling Stone, Reznor called "The Way He Looks at Me" as one of his favorite tracks on the album. He added that when he and Ross were thinking about usages in compositions, it all began from hints given by Fincher. They used customized instruments like "homemade boxes that had small mics fit in it". He said that they captured guitar strings loops by hitting it and developing a repeating pattern deliberately making it uneven. Thus, the foreground created was a kind of unease justified when there were moments of tension in the film. So instead of it naturally building, they compared the loop sounds to foot's dragging or something being stuck.

== Marketing ==
In the case of Gone Girl, it felt organic-y to start. As we started working on it, it felt like it could use the idea of orchestra, so we ended up using an orchestra for bits of it to layer in with what we've done, which was an interesting process.

— Trent Reznor on working with the live orchestras for first time for the score

In April 2014, a website titled "amazingamy.com" was set up to promote the film. The website featured score but was touted to be composed by Reznor and Ross. In July 2014, the website "gonegirlmovie.com" was updated to also have background music similar to the first audio but was titled "Echoes". A trailer was released on July 7, 2014 which featured both the website based music and new music. On 20 September 2014, "gonegirl.com" was updated with new music titled "Mixdown", a megamix of songs from the soundtrack album. Later, NIN updating a splash screen introducing the score, the album artwork and the track "The Way He Looks At Me" running behind the frame.

== Critical response ==
Professional ratings
Aggregate scores
Source	Rating
Metacritic	84/100
Review scores
Source	Rating
AllMusic	4/5 stars
Consequence of Sound	B+
Drowned in Sound	8/10
NME	8/10

The soundtrack has been met with critical acclaim by critics, with an average rating of 84 out of 100 based on five reviews on Metacritic.

Consequence of Sound critic Leah Pickett stated: "The cinesonic union of Fincher, Reznor, and Ross is stronger than ever." Justin Chang of Variety felt, "Trent Reznor and Atticus Ross, whose moody electronic compositions have become synonymous with the director's work, once again devise a soundscape that all but pulses with dread, this time by lacing more traditional orchestral fare with their trademark synths.

Writing for The New Yorker, Anthony Lane felt, "Nothing could equip Fincher better for the coiled and clustered goings on in the new film, and, for good measure, he has hired Trent Reznor and Atticus Ross to compose the score and they don't let Fincher down." Genevieve Koski of The Dissolve compared the composer's previous scores, stating, "Trent Reznor and Atticus Ross, all of whom have been helping steer the look and sound of Fincher's films since The Social Network, and all of whom do characteristically effective but unflashy work in Gone Girl." Writing for Slate, Dana Stevens felt, "An eerie (if a little too omnipresent) electronic score by Trent Reznor and Atticus Ross sounds sensational" At USA Today, Claudia Puig praised the score as, "A pervasively menacing atmosphere — intensified by Trent Reznor and Atticus Ross' eerily evocative score — keeps the audience mesmerized." For Hitfix, Drew McWeeny summarized, "Trent Reznor and Atticus Ross contribute the most difficult score they've composed so far here, giving us nothing resembling a typical emotional cue. It is the polar opposite of the score that Thomas Newman wrote for The Judge, all clingy and needy and cloying and over-emphatic about any possible feeling the audience might be expected to have for themselves. Ross and Reznor had written something that feels designed to make you uncomfortable. It is a hair shirt of a score, itchy and strange and almost offensive on some level, and I love it."

"Trent Reznor and Atticus Ross complement the film's jagged, uncertain tone with a suitably downbeat electronic score", such was stated by Marc Savlov, writing for The Austin Chronicle newspaper. For The A.V. Club, Ignatiy Vishnevetsky called the score framed on lines Mark Isham-esque. However, he called it 'silky'" Writing for Oregon Live, Jeff Baker felt, "Composers Atticus and Reznor -- for three movies in a row and they've got it down. "Gone Girl" works the way a Swiss watch works, money well spent in every frame." Michael Phillips of Chicago Tribune called the scoring 'remarkable', 'throbbing' underscoring by composers Trent Reznor and Atticus Ross, enough to make one forget the story's phonier constructs and less plausible supporting characters. At Vulture, David Edelstein praised the score stating, "The spooky astral music (by Trent Reznor and Atticus Ross) is like purgatory in beige" Critic Matt Zoller Seitz wrote for RogerEbert.com, "For long stretches, Fincher's gliding widescreen camerawork, immaculate compositions and sickly, desaturated colors fuse with Trent Reznor and Atticus Ross's creepy-optimistic synthesized score to create a perverse big-screen version of one of those TV comedies built around a pathetically unobservant lump of a husband and his hypercontrolling, slightly shrewish wife." Richard Roeper of Chicago Sun-Times wrote, "The score from Trent Reznor and Atticus Ross is nomination-worthy." Liam Lacey of The Globe and Mail commented, "Throughout, the electronic score by Trent Reznor and Atticus Ross grinds, squawks and groans, communicating the rising panic beneath the placid surface." Writing for Rolling Stone, Peter Travers noted, "Composers Trent Reznor and Atticus Ross, artfully escalate the seething tension." Seattle Gay News said the score "might just be the best the pair has composed for the director yet, their sonic landscape a bouncy smorgasbord of ennui, regret, pain, euphoria and subterfuge that augments the film's themes and ideas splendidly."

Much less enthusiastic was Jonathan Broxton of Movie Music UK, member of the International Film Music Critics Association, who wrote of the score: "The lack of any emotional development beyond the general mood of uneasiness makes the film a one-note auditory bore. The music stops us from feeling any of the nuance or subtlety the acting or writing may have otherwise provided, because it never alters its disposition. (...) As an artist with Nine Inch Nails, Trent Reznor was genuinely groundbreaking. However, I just don't buy into all the hype about his film music career. I read reviews from professional critics in well-respected music magazines, and they all laud him as though he is the individual savior of the art, someone who is finally writing the sort of edgy, avant-garde film music we have all needed all these years, but were too stupid to realize. I just don't buy it. (...) As an album of ambient electronica [Gone Girl] may be appealing to those who have an affinity for that sort of music. However, as actual film music, it's as much as a failure as its two predecessors."

== Track listing ==
All tracks are written by Trent Reznor and Atticus Ross.

Gone Girl (Soundtrack from the Motion Picture)
No.	Title	Length
1.	"What Have We Done to Each Other?"	2:30
2.	"Sugar Storm"	2:53
3.	"Empty Places"	2:46
4.	"With Suspicion"	3:16
5.	"Just Like You"	4:11
6.	"Appearances"	2:52
7.	"Clue One"	1:30
8.	"Clue Two"	5:10
9.	"Background Noise"	3:09
10.	"Procedural"	4:30
11.	"Something Disposable"	4:28
12.	"Like Home"	3:39
13.	"Empty Places (Reprise)"	2:20
14.	"The Way He Looks at Me"	3:27
15.	"Technically, Missing"	6:43
16.	"Secrets"	3:08
17.	"Perpetual"	4:00
18.	"Strange Activities"	2:37
19.	"Still Gone"	2:47
20.	"A Reflection"	1:46
21.	"Consummation"	4:09
22.	"Sugar Storm (Reprise)"	0:49
23.	"What Will We Do?"	3:05
24.	"At Risk"	11:05
Total length:		86:42

== Accolades ==
List of awards and nominations
Award	Date of ceremony	Category	Recipient(s) and nominee(s)	Result	Ref(s)
Broadcast Film Critics Association Awards	January 15, 2015	Best Score	Trent Reznor and Atticus Ross	Nominated	
Florida Film Critics Circle Awards	December 19, 2014	Best Score	Trent Reznor and Atticus Ross	Runner-up	
Golden Globe Awards	January 11, 2015	Best Original Score	Trent Reznor and Atticus Ross	Nominated	
Grammy Awards	February 8, 2015	Best Score Soundtrack for Visual Media	Trent Reznor and Atticus Ross	Nominated	
Phoenix Film Critics Society Awards	December 16, 2014	Best Score	Trent Reznor and Atticus Ross	Nominated	
San Diego Film Critics Society Awards	December 15, 2014	Best Score	Trent Reznor and Atticus Ross	Nominated	
Satellite Awards	February 15, 2015	Best Original Score	Trent Reznor and Atticus Ross	Nominated	
St. Louis Gateway Film Critics Association Awards	December 15, 2014	Best Score	Trent Reznor and Atticus Ross	Nominated	
Washington D.C. Area Film Critics Association Awards	December 8, 2014	Original Score	Trent Reznor and Atticus Ross	Nominated	
