= Before the Flood (soundtrack) =

Soundtrack album by Trent Reznor, Atticus Ross, Mogwai and Gustavo Santaolalla
- Released: October 21, 2016
- Recorded: 2016
- Studio: Los Angeles, California
- Genre: Post-rock; experimental ambient; post-industrial
- Length: 90:46
- Label: Lakeshore
- Producer: Trent Reznor; Atticus Ross

Trent Reznor and Atticus Ross chronology
Gone Girl (2014)	Before the Flood (2016)	Patriots Day (2017)

Mogwai chronology
Atomic (2016)	Before the Flood (2016)	Every Country's Sun (2017)

Before the Flood is a collaboration soundtrack album by Trent Reznor, Atticus Ross, Mogwai and Gustavo Santaolalla for Fisher Stevens's film of the same name. It was originally made available as an Apple Music exclusive on October 21, 2016 and received a wide digital release on October 28. A CD release is scheduled for December 16, 2016 with a vinyl release to follow. The song "A Minute to Breathe" was first made available as a digital single on October 7, 2016. The album was released on Lakeshore Records.

== Production ==
The soundtrack was created in a collaborative project by several well-known international artists, all of whom had previously been known for their work and many awards received: the American musician Trent Reznor, the English musician Atticus Ross, who formed together the band How to Destroy Angels, collaborated on several Nine Inch Nails albums and scores for films. The pair were awarded the Academy Award for Best Original Score for their work on David Fincher's The Social Network in 2011. Among other musicians involved in this project are the Scottish post-rock band Mogwai, who have produced music for movies before (Zidane: A 21st Century Portrait, the French TV series The Returned and the documentary film Atomic, Living in Dread and Promise) and Gustavo Santaolalla, an Argentine musician, film composer and producer who has won two Academy Awards for Best Original Score for Brokeback Mountain in 2005, and Babel in 2006.

== Track listing ==
No.	Title	Writer(s)	Length
1.	"Before the Flood" (featuring Gustavo Santaolalla)	Trent Reznor, Atticus Ross	7:53
2.	"A Minute to Breathe"	Trent Reznor, Atticus Ross	6:07
3.	"Between Two Poles" (featuring Trent Reznor, Atticus Ross)	Gustavo Santaolalla	8:06
4.	"Dust Bowl"	Mogwai	2:50
5.	"Thin Ice"	Gustavo Santaolalla	1:05
6.	"And When the Sky Was Opened"	Trent Reznor, Atticus Ross	6:35
7.	"Ghost Nets"	Mogwai	5:13
8.	"Trembling" (featuring Trent Reznor, Atticus Ross)	Gustavo Santaolalla	5:01
9.	"One More Step"	Gustavo Santaolalla	3:32
10.	"Huaynaputina"	Mogwai	6:39
11.	"At Dusk" (featuring Gustavo Santaolalla)	Trent Reznor, Atticus Ross	5:41
12.	"Thin Ice Reimagined" (featuring Trent Reznor, Atticus Ross)	Gustavo Santaolalla	6:09
13.	"Disappearing Act"	Trent Reznor, Atticus Ross	3:52
14.	"The Melting Pot"	Gustavo Santaolalla	2:05
15.	"8 Billion"	Trent Reznor, Atticus Ross	8:41
16.	"One Perfect Moment"	Trent Reznor, Atticus Ross	10:08
17.	"A Minute Later"	Trent Reznor, Atticus Ross	1:46
18.	"After the Flood"	Mogwai	5:09
Total length:			90:46
