= Bones and All (soundtrack) =

Bones and All (Original Score)

Film score by Trent Reznor and Atticus Ross
- Released: November 18, 2022
- Recorded: 2021–2022
- Genre: Film score
- Length: 73:35
- Label: The Null Corporation
- Producer: Trent Reznor; Atticus Ross

Trent Reznor and Atticus Ross chronology
22 vs. Earth (2021)	Bones and All (2022)	Empire of Light (2022)

Bones and All (Original Score) is the score album to the 2022 film of the same name, directed by Luca Guadagnino and starring Taylor Russell and Timothée Chalamet. The film's score was composed by Trent Reznor and Atticus Ross and was released on November 18, 2022, on Reznor's label The Null Corporation. It features 23 score tracks, along with the original song, "(You Make Me Feel Like) Home". The score features acoustic music representing the Midwestern United States, and draws inspiration from classical Americana songs, that depicts the relationship between the leading characters, despite the horror setting.

== Background ==
The film was Reznor and Ross' first collaboration with Luca Guadagnino. The pair were "spellbound by how he had taken this material and infused humanity, vulnerability and life into this, which was breathtaking" and "felt like it doesn't even need music". Both Reznor and Ross had discussed extensively regarding the score, where Guadagnino stated that he wanted it to be "a melancholic elegy, an unending longing. It needs to be a character in the film, a part of the landscape". Ross added, "When the film opens, there's the element of the love themes that the characters haven't found themselves, but as the story progresses, it becomes more intense and intertwined. But within that journey, as their love progresses, we managed to figure out a way where the eating theme could work and intertwine in the same way the story does."

Guadagnino requested the use of acoustic guitars to complement the Americana visuals, while Ross felt that they knew that guitar will be "the central element of the music". Reznor and Ross noted that they experiment with a lot of different sounds before figuring out how the score will sit in the film. Reznor and Ross wrote the original song "(You Make Me Feel Like) Home", with Ross saying, "I can say that I think it's devastating when that song comes in [...] I know I can speak for us both when I say we fell in love with those characters and with that particular moment with those particular lyrics, the imagery and the sparseness." The song stemmed from their personal connections to Russell and Chalamet's characters. Ross described, "That doesn't happen all the time. But over the period of the six, eight or 10 months that you're working every day watching these people, you're breathing life into scenarios they're in with the music that you're using to help tell their story."

Initially, the duo composed around 10 pieces for the film before seeing the rough cut, but when they saw the full film, "[our] minds were blown, the transformation of the written page into living, breathing characters filled with vulnerabilities. And the beauty of his camera work and the set design and the sense of place and just the sadness of the story came into full focus for us, and we were off to the races."

== Track listing ==
Bones and All (Original Score)
No.	Title	Writer(s)	Length
1.	"I'm with You (A Way Out)"	Trent Reznor; Atticus Ross	1:24
2.	"Lost Girls"	Reznor; Ross	1:15
3.	"Good and Destroyed"	Reznor; Ross	1:57
4.	"Vinegar"	Reznor; Ross	6:25
5.	"I'm With You (You Seem Nice)"	Reznor; Ross	2:05
6.	"It's Your Turn"	Reznor; Ross	1:58
7.	"You Don't Have to Be Alone"	Reznor; Ross	2:56
8.	"Forgotten Pictures"	Reznor; Ross	0:49
9.	"In Dreams"	Reznor; Ross	0:17
10.	"I'm With You"	Reznor; Ross	6:26
11.	"By the Light of the Campfire"	Reznor; Ross	3:40
12.	"Night in the Cornfield"	Reznor; Ross	1:52
13.	"We Should Feel Something"	Reznor; Ross	2:33
14.	"It's Just Darkness"	Reznor; Ross	2:33
15.	"You'll See What I Mean"	Reznor; Ross	3:42
16.	"I'm With You (Always)"	Reznor; Ross	2:36
17.	"Destroyed"	Reznor; Ross	1:02
18.	"Violence Remains"	Reznor; Ross	0:58
19.	"The Great Wide Open"	Reznor; Ross	5:07
20.	"Normal Life"	Reznor; Ross	2:29
21.	"Other Paths Not Explored"	Reznor; Ross	1:37
22.	"Unfinished Business"	Reznor; Ross	10:31
23.	"(You Made It Feel) Like Home"	Reznor; Ross	4:06
24.	"The Great Wide Open (Reprise)"	Reznor; Ross	5:17
Total length:			73:35

== Additional music ==
In addition to the original score, the non-album songs featured in the film are: "Everything I Need" by Men at Work, "Save a Prayer" by Duran Duran, “Cadillac Encounter” by The Mears Brothers”, "Lick It Up" by Kiss, "Amarillo by Morning" by George Strait, "Your Silent Face" by New Order, "Atmosphere" by Joy Division, "The Sun Always Shines on T.V." by a-ha, and "Obsession" by Animotion.

== Charts ==
Chart (2022)	Peak position
UK Soundtrack Albums (OCC)	44

== Accolades ==
Accolades for Bones and All
Award	Date of ceremony	Category	Recipient(s)	Result	Ref.
Hollywood Music in Media Awards	November 16, 2022	Best Original Song in a Feature Film	Trent Reznor and Atticus Ross ("(You Made it Feel Like) Home")	Nominated	
