= Teenage Mutant Ninja Turtles: Mutant Mayhem (soundtrack) =

Teenage Mutant Ninja Turtles: Mutant Mayhem (Original Score)

Film score by Trent Reznor and Atticus Ross
- Released: July 28, 2023
- Recorded: 2022–2023
- Genre: Film score
- Length: 51:01
- Label: The Null Corporation
- Producers: Trent Reznor; Atticus Ross

Trent Reznor and Atticus Ross chronology
Empire of Light (2022)	Teenage Mutant Ninja Turtles: Mutant Mayhem (2023)	The Killer (2023)

Teenage Mutant Ninja Turtles: Mutant Mayhem (Original Score) is the soundtrack to the 2023 film of the same name, directed by Jeff Rowe and featuring original music by Trent Reznor and Atticus Ross. Reznor and Ross aimed to give some of the tracks a garage band feel. The soundtrack was released on July 28, 2023, by Reznor's label, The Null Corporation, and received a largely positive critical response.

== Background and release ==
In May 2023, it was announced that the score for film was composed by Trent Reznor and Atticus Ross, with Gabe Hilfer as the music supervisor. Hilfer knew Reznor and Ross's manager and was able to get a meeting between them, director Jeff Rowe, and the film's crew. Rowe felt that they took the meeting because of their admiration for his previous film, The Mitchells vs. the Machines (2021), and producer Seth Rogen's This Is the End (2013). The crew showed the duo concept art and told them what they were trying to achieve artistically with the film. Reznor and Ross then asked for a script for the film, to which, in response, Rowe and Rogen rewrote it several times to make it "bulletproof" and put their "best foot forward."

For some of the tracks, Reznor and Ross aimed to emulate garage band music. 4 Non Blondes "What's Up?" is used during a chase sequence in the film; it transitions into the "Fabulous Secret Powers" version of the song by SLACKCiRCUS, a viral internet meme from 2005. The sequence was originally set to the track "Goochie Goochie Goo" from Reznor and Ross's score, which Rowe praised. After a screening, the team felt that the scene would be better if it was funnier, with Rogen suggesting they use "a crazy version" of "What's Up". Reznor and Ross' score was released through the Null Corporation label on July 28, 2023, five days before the film's release in the United States.

== Reception ==
The score received a largely positive reception. Germain Lussier of Gizmodo called the score "electric". Tim Grierson of Screen International and Maya Phillips of The New York Times described Reznor and Ross's score as "dazzling" and "killer", both praising the duo's use of energetic pieces contrasted with softer ones. DiscussingFilm's Andrew J. Salazar felt that the duo were "the perfect match for TMNT", adding that they captured "the youthful energy of the four turtle brothers". Rafael Motomayor of /Film also described the score as youthful, feeling that it was bold and new for the duo.

Isaac Feldberg of Above the Line wrote, "Matching the sense of rocket-fueled propulsion is a bursting, acid-bathed industrial score by Trent Reznor and Atticus Ross, which mirrors the film's dark, neon-jagged color palette while restlessly clamoring with its same defining sense of impassioned creativity and relentless forward momentum". Jessica Gardener of MovieWeb ranked it third in Reznor and Ross's scores and wrote, "the duo gives the score a garage band vibe, matching the gritty, dirty dwellings of the sewers. It also infuses it with an energy fitting the teenage heroes. Their score is just one of many reasons why the movie is one of the best films of 2023 so far". Jack Pooley of WhatCulture.com wrote, "Reznor and Ross' work on this movie is absolutely wild – a boldly freeform digital jazz session that leaps from gorgeously relaxing synths to more discordant electronic drum tracks."

== Track listing ==
All tracks are written by Trent Reznor and Atticus Ross.

Teenage Mutant Ninja Turtles: Mutant Mayhem (Original Score) track listing
No.	Title	Length
1.	"The Man in the Basement"	3:38
2.	"New Form of Life Itself"	1:12
3.	"Dipshits on a Roof"	0:54
4.	"Murder the Shreks!"	2:03
5.	"Maybe One Day"	0:54
6.	"Something to Love"	2:59
7.	"What's the Worst That Could Happen?"	1:37
8.	"(The Worst That Could Happen)"	0:44
9.	"We Only Need Each Other"	1:05
10.	"Grand Theft Ice Cream Truck"	2:09
11.	"Techno Cosmic Research Institute"	1:26
12.	"Eye of the Tiger, Raph"	0:28
13.	"I Just Met You and You Almost Killed Me"	0:57
14.	"Accept Us."	0:10
15.	"Puke Girl"	0:12
16.	"Megamind, Gru-Type SH*T"	1:18
17.	"Brought a Mutant to a Ninja Fight"	0:51
18.	"We're Very Well Adjusted"	1:33
19.	"Goochie Goochie Goo"	3:09
20.	"She's Gonna Milk Us"	3:39
21.	"Do You Need a Veterinarian?"	1:59
22.	"Enter the 37th Chamber"	3:15
23.	"A Zed and Two Noughts"	2:12
24.	"I Don't Need That Horse"	0:58
25.	"Better Than Mark Ruffalo"	2:30
26.	"Thing from My Past"	0:47
27.	"Conveniently Placed Pizza Van"	1:52
28.	"Trapped Like a Rat"	1:32
29.	"Attack On a Titan"	2:15
30.	"Happy Ending / Sewer Home"	2:27
Total length:		51:01

== Charts ==
Chart performance for Teenage Mutant Ninja Turtles: Mutant Mayhem (Original Score)
Chart (2023)	Peak position
UK Soundtrack Albums (Official Charts)	31
UK Album Downloads (Official Charts)	80

== Accolades ==
Accolades received by Teenage Mutant Ninja Turtles: Mutant Mayhem (Original Score)
Award	Date of ceremony	Category	Recipient(s)	Result	Ref.
Annie Awards	February 17, 2024	Outstanding Achievement for Music in a Feature Production	Trent Reznor, Atticus Ross	Nominated	

== Songs featured in the film ==
Mutant Mayhem features hip-hop music from popular artists, with a heavy emphasis on classic East Coast hip-hop to go with the film's setting. Many of the songs used in the films were ones that Rogen and Rowe would regularly listen to. According to Rogen, Rowe likened the soundtrack to that of the Tony Hawk's video game series. Rogen would describe it as a "random assortment of music" that fits together well and shares the "same energy and spirit". Vanilla Ice's "Ninja Rap" from Teenage Mutant Ninja Turtles II: The Secret of the Ooze (1991) is featured in the film, a suggestion that was made by Rogen. According to Rowe, getting legal clearance for Blackstreet's "No Diggity" was difficult. The team explored using alternatives for the sequence featuring the song, such as DMX's "Ruff Ryder's Anthem". However, after watching a version of the film with "No Diggity", it was agreed that it should stay. An official playlist of some songs featured in the film was released on Spotify.

Licensed songs that were included in the film include:

Song title	Author	Key scenes/Notes
"Ante Up (Robin Hoodz Theory)"	M.O.P.	The Turtles go grocery shopping. Later plays as the Turtles, Splinter, April O'Neil, and other mutants arrive in New York City to battle a further mutated Superfly.
"Danke Schoen"	Wayne Newton	The Turtles catch an outdoor showing of the film Ferris Bueller's Day Off (1986) in which the song is featured.
"Eye Know"	De La Soul	Montage of the Turtles and Splinter growing up together.
"Scarface (Push It to the Limit)"	Paul Engemann	Montage of the Turtles and Splinter learning how to fight.
"The Karate Rap"	David Seeger and Holly W. Seeger	Montage of the Turtles and Splinter learning how to fight.
"Love Is An Illusion"	Ronnie Walker	Leonardo sees April for the first time.
"Ninja Rap"	Vanilla Ice	The song on the car radio during the fight in the chop shop.
"Riot"	Hugh Masekela	The Turtles explain their origins to April.
"Cavern"	Liquid Liquid	The Turtles contemplate whether to call April.
"Dance"	ESG	The Turtles decide to go see April again.
"Unwritten"	Natasha Bedingfield	April's flashback of her vomiting while doing school announcements.
"No Diggity"	Blackstreet	The Turtles fight various crime families across New York who work for Superfly.
"Wake Up in the Sky"	Gucci Mane, Bruno Mars and Kodak Black	Superfly and his gang show up.
"Shimmy Shimmy Ya"	Ol' Dirty Bastard	The Turtles go to Quantum Lanes to hang out with Superfly and his gang.
"What's Up?"	4 Non Blondes	The Turtles drive in a van with Mondo Gecko, Rocksteady, and Wingnut. Ray Fillet later sings an acoustic version of the song.
"Butter"	BTS	Leonardo, Michelangelo, and Raphael attempt to sing to cheer up Donatello.
"Mr. Lonely"	Bobby Vinton	Splinter hopes for the Turtles to return to their sewer home.
"Can I Kick It?"	A Tribe Called Quest	The Turtles go to school for the first time. Continues to play during the end credits.
