= How to Destroy Angels (How to Destroy Angels EP) =

EP by How to Destroy Angels
- Released: June 1, 2010
- Genre: Post-industrial, experimental, electronica
- Length: 27:49
- Label: The Null Corporation
- Producer: How to Destroy Angels

How to Destroy Angels chronology
How to Destroy Angels (2010)	An omen EP_ (2012)

Sigil numbers chronology
Sigil 02 (2010)	Sigil 03 (2012)

Digital EP Cover

Singles from How to Destroy Angels
- 1. "A Drowning" Released: May 4, 2010

Professional ratings
Review scores
Source	Rating
AllMusic	3/5 stars
One Thirty BPM	(67%)
Pitchfork	(7.0/10)
The Second Supper	4/5 stars
Fine Print Magazine	(45%)

How to Destroy Angels is the debut extended play by post-industrial group How to Destroy Angels. The six-song EP was released as a free download via the band's website on June 1, 2010, and a retail CD was released on July 6, 2010. A "Hi-Def Upgrade" was also available, with higher quality audio and the music video for the song "The Space in Between", while "A Drowning" was officially released as a single.

As with many of Trent Reznor's official releases, it was designated with a unique name and number: "SIGIL 02".

The EP was included as bonus tracks on the iTunes release of their debut album, Welcome Oblivion.

== Artwork ==
The artwork for the release was created by Mark Weaver, under art direction by Rob Sheridan. Sheridan stated that the choice for Weaver was to make the release as visually distinct as possible from Nine Inch Nails.

For unexplained reasons, the physical and digital EP both came with different artwork.

== Promotion ==
- The song "Fur Lined" was used in episode 7 ("Clawback") of the second season of television show Nikita.
- "The Believers" was used in the 2011 film Limitless and was featured on the soundtrack.
- "The Space in Between" was featured in the promo for the TV series Hannibal.

== Track listing ==
No.	Title	Length
1.	"The Space in Between"	3:35
2.	"Parasite"	5:05
3.	"Fur Lined"	4:00
4.	"BBB"	3:31
5.	"The Believers"	5:36
6.	"A Drowning"	7:04

== Album personnel ==
Written, arranged, produced, performed and art directed by How to Destroy Angels.

  - Mariqueen Maandig
  - Trent Reznor
  - Atticus Ross
  - Rob Sheridan
- Mixed by Alan Moulder
- Engineering: Blumpy
- Mastering: Tom Baker
