= Mariqueen Maandig =

American musician

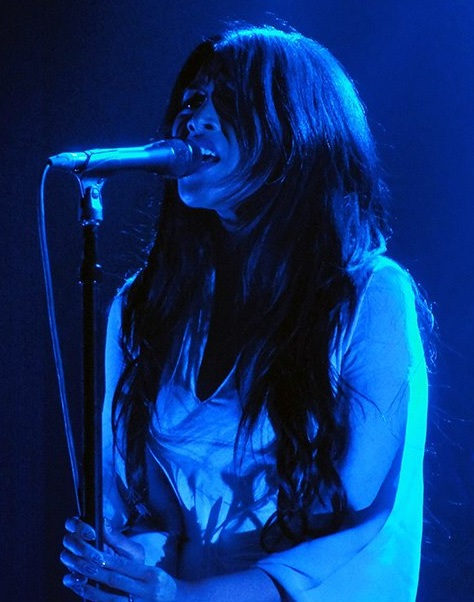
- Maandig performing in May 2013
- Born: Mariqueen Arrabaca Maandig; April 5, 1981 (age 45); Philippines
- Occupations: Singer; songwriter; musician
- Years active: 2004–present
- Spouse: Trent Reznor (m. 2009)
- Children: 6
- Musical career
- Genres: Alternative rock; post-industrial
- Instruments: Vocals; bass; keyboards
- Member of: How to Destroy Angels; Nine Inch Noize
- Formerly of: West Indian Girl; Ming & Ping

Mariqueen Maandig Reznor (née Maandig; born April 5, 1981) is a Filipino-American singer, songwriter, and musician. She is the vocalist for How to Destroy Angels, and the former vocalist of Los Angeles–based rock band West Indian Girl.

== Career ==
=== West Indian Girl (2004–2009) ===
Maandig was a vocalist for the band West Indian Girl from 2004 to 2009, performing on the albums West Indian Girl and 4th & Wall.

She appeared in Playboy magazine as the "Becoming Attraction" for the January 2009 issue.

=== How to Destroy Angels (since 2010) ===
In 2010, Maandig and her husband Trent Reznor formed the group How to Destroy Angels, along with long-time Reznor collaborators Atticus Ross and Rob Sheridan.

They have released two EPs named How to Destroy Angels and An Omen, and a studio album, Welcome Oblivion.

=== Nine Inch Noize (since 2026) ===
In April 2026, Maandig appeared onstage at the Coachella Festival with her husband, Trent Reznor, along with Nine Inch Nails member Atticus Ross, and Iraqi-German electronic music producer Alexander Ridha (aka Boys Noize) as part of a new supergroup which emerged from Reznor, Ross, and Ridha having collaborated and toured together through 2025 and 2026. The group, called Nine Inch Noize, featured Maandig on backing vocals. They announced a full-length album released on April 17, 2026.

=== Guest appearances ===
Maandig has worked with LA-based songwriter BAO and appeared as a guest vocalist on two of his band Ming & Ping's songs, "Mixed Melodies" from their eponymous 2009 album and "Chinatown" from 2012's The Darkness of Night.

She also provided backing vocals on the track "She's Gone Away" on Nine Inch Nails' 2016 EP Not the Actual Events, as well as on “Shit Mirror" off the band's 2018 album Bad Witch.

== Personal life ==
Maandig grew up in Orange County, California. She married Trent Reznor in October 2009. They have six children together. She keeps her personal life private, stating she likes to keep a “shroud of mystery.”

== Discography ==
With West Indian Girl

- West Indian Girl (2004)
- 4th & Wall (2007)

With How to Destroy Angels

- How to Destroy Angels (2010)
- An Omen EP (2012)
- Welcome Oblivion (2013)

With Reznor and Ross

- Challengers (2024) - credited as performer in the film's soundtrack

With Nine Inch Noize

- Nine Inch Noize (2026)
