= Trent Reznor =

American musician (born 1965)

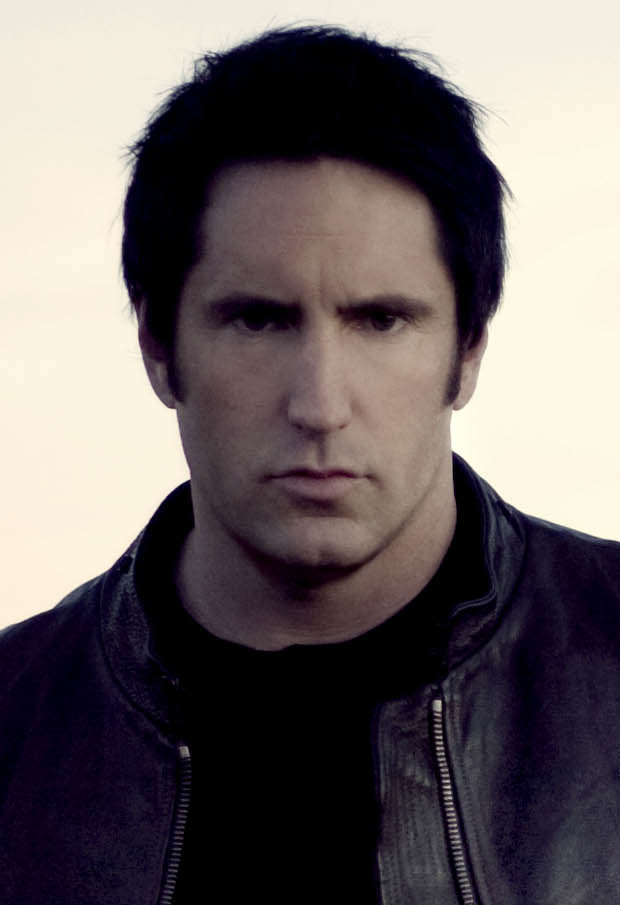
- Reznor in 2008
- Born: Michael Trent Reznor; May 17, 1965 (age 61); New Castle, Pennsylvania, U.S.
- Occupations: Musician; singer; songwriter; composer; producer
- Years active: 1982–present
- Spouse: Mariqueen Maandig (m. 2009)
- Children: 6
- Musical career
- Origin: Cleveland, Ohio, U.S.
- Genres: Industrial rock; industrial metal; alternative rock; post-industrial; synth-pop; electronic; film score
- Instruments: Vocals; guitar; keyboards; synthesizers
- Labels: The Null Corporation; Columbia; Nothing; Interscope; Universal; TVT
- Member of: Nine Inch Nails; How to Destroy Angels; WitchGang; Nine Inch Noize
- Formerly of: Option 30; Slam Bamboo; Exotic Birds; The Innocent; Lucky Pierre; Sound City Players; Tapeworm
- Website: nin.com

Michael Trent Reznor (born May 17, 1965) is an American musician, singer, songwriter, and composer. He came to prominence as the founder, lead singer, multi-instrumentalist, and primary songwriter of the industrial rock band Nine Inch Nails. The band's line-up has constantly changed, with Reznor being its only official member from its creation in 1988 until 2016, when he added English musician and frequent collaborator Atticus Ross as its second permanent member.

Reznor began his career in 1982 as a member of synth-pop bands such as The Innocent, Slam Bamboo, and Exotic Birds. The first Nine Inch Nails album, Pretty Hate Machine (1989), was a moderate success but largely remained popular with underground audiences; the next two albums, The Downward Spiral (1994) and The Fragile (1999), brought the band widespread critical acclaim. There have since been eight Nine Inch Nails albums and six EPs. Reznor has also contributed to the work of artists such as rock singer Marilyn Manson, rapper Saul Williams, and pop singer Halsey. Alongside his wife Mariqueen Maandig and long-time collaborators Atticus Ross and Rob Sheridan, he formed the post-industrial group How to Destroy Angels in 2009.

Since 2010, Reznor and Ross have worked on numerous film and television scores, most notably for movies directed by David Fincher and Luca Guadagnino. These include Fincher's The Social Network (2010), The Girl with the Dragon Tattoo (2011), Gone Girl (2014), Mank (2020) and The Killer (2023), as well as Guadagnino's Bones and All (2022), Challengers (2024), Queer (2024) and After The Hunt (2025). Reznor and Ross twice won the Academy Award for Best Original Score – for The Social Network and Soul (2020), and won two Grammy Awards for scoring The Girl with the Dragon Tattoo and Soul, sharing both awards (as well as the Golden Globe) for Soul with co-composer Jon Batiste. Reznor and Ross won the Primetime Emmy Award for Outstanding Music Composition for a Limited Series for Watchmen (2019). The pair also scored Ken Burns's 10-part documentary The Vietnam War (2017).

== Early life ==
Michael Trent Reznor was born in New Castle, Pennsylvania, on May 17, 1965, the son of Nancy Lou (née Clark) and Michael Reznor. He is of German and Irish descent, and grew up in Mercer. His great-grandfather, George Reznor, founded the heating and air conditioning manufacturer Reznor Company in 1884. After his parents divorced when he was six years old, Reznor's sister Tera lived with their mother while he went to live with his maternal grandparents. He began playing the piano at the age of 12 and showed an early aptitude for music. His grandfather told People in February 1995, "He was a good kid [...] a Boy Scout who loved to skateboard, build model planes, and play the piano. Music was his life, from the time he was a wee boy. He was so gifted."

Reznor has acknowledged that his sheltered life left him feeling isolated from the outside world. In a September 1994 interview with Rolling Stone, he said of his career choices, "I don't know why I want to do these things, other than my desire to escape from Small Town, U.S.A., to dismiss the boundaries, to explore. It isn't a bad place where I grew up, but there was nothing going on but the cornfields. My life experience came from watching movies, watching TV and reading books and looking at magazines. And when your culture comes from watching TV every day, you're bombarded with images of things that seem cool, places that seem interesting, people who have jobs and careers and opportunities. None of that happened where I was. You're almost taught to realize it's not for you." However, in April 1995, he told Details that he did not "want to give the impression it was a miserable childhood".

Reznor would later recall, "The first concert I ever saw was the Eagles in 1976. The excitement of the night struck a chord with me and I remember thinking, 'Someday I'd love to be up on that stage.'" At Mercer Area Junior/Senior High School, he learned to play the tenor saxophone and tuba, and was a member of both the jazz band and marching band. The school's former band director remembered him as "very upbeat and friendly". He became involved in theater while in high school, being awarded the "Best in Drama" accolade by his classmates for his roles as Judas in Jesus Christ Superstar and Professor Harold Hill in The Music Man. He graduated in 1983 and enrolled at Allegheny College in Meadville, where he studied computer engineering.

== Career ==
=== Early projects ===
While still in high school, Reznor joined local band Option 30 and played three shows a week with them. After a year of college, he dropped out to pursue a career in music in Cleveland, Ohio. His first band in Cleveland was the Urge, a cover band. In 1985, he joined The Innocent as a keyboardist; they released one album, Livin' in the Street, but Reznor left the band after three months. In 1986, he joined local band Exotic Birds and appeared with them as a fictional band called The Problems in the 1987 film Light of Day. During this time, Reznor also contributed on keyboards to the band Slam Bamboo and briefly joined the new wave band Lucky Pierre.

Reznor got a job at Cleveland's Right Track Studio as an assistant engineer and janitor. Studio owner Bart Koster later commented, "He is so focused in everything he does. When that guy waxed the floor, it looked great." Reznor asked Koster for permission to record demos of his own songs for free during unused studio time. Koster agreed, remarking that it cost him "just a little wear on [his] tape heads".

=== Nine Inch Nails ===
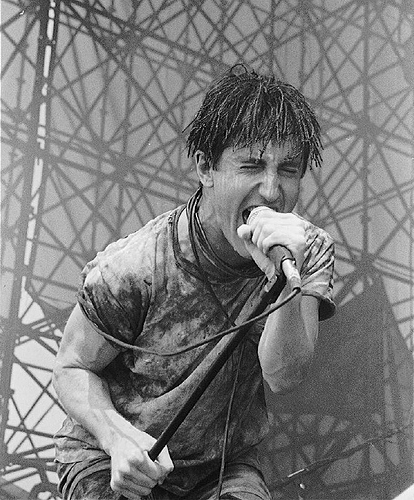
Reznor performing at the 1991 Lollapalooza festival

While assembling the earliest Nine Inch Nails recordings, Reznor was unable to find a band that could articulate his songs as he wanted. Instead, inspired by Prince, he played all the instruments except drums himself. He continued in this role on most Nine Inch Nails studio recordings, though he has occasionally involved other musicians, assistants, drummers, and rhythm experts. Several labels responded favorably to the demo material, and Reznor signed with TVT Records. Nine selections from the Right Track demos were unofficially released years later in 1994 as Purest Feeling and many of these songs appeared in revised form on Pretty Hate Machine, Reznor's first official release under the Nine Inch Nails name.

Pretty Hate Machine was released in 1989 and was a moderate commercial success, certified Gold in 1992. Amid pressure from his record label to produce a follow-up to Pretty Hate Machine, Reznor secretly began recording under various pseudonyms to avoid record company interference, resulting in an EP called Broken (1992). Nine Inch Nails was included in the Lollapalooza tour in the summer of 1991, and won a Grammy Award in 1993 under "Best Heavy Metal Performance" for the song "Wish".

Nine Inch Nails's second full-length album, The Downward Spiral, entered the Billboard 200 chart in 1994 at number two, and remains the highest-selling Nine Inch Nails release in America. To record the album, Reznor rented and moved into the 10050 Cielo Drive mansion, where the Tate–LaBianca murders had been perpetrated by the Manson Family in 1969. He built a studio space in the house, which he renamed Le Pig, after the word that was scrawled on the front door in Sharon Tate's blood by her murderers. Reznor told Entertainment Weekly that, despite the notoriety attached to the house, he chose to record there because he "looked at a lot of places, and this just happened to be the one I liked most". He explained that he was fascinated by the house due to his interest in "American folklore", but has stated that he does not "want to support serial-killer bullshit."

Nine Inch Nails toured extensively over the next few years, including a performance at Woodstock '94, although Reznor admitted to the audience that he did not like to play large venues. Around this time, Reznor's studio perfectionism, struggles with addiction, and bouts of writer's block prolonged the production of a follow-up to The Downward Spiral.

In 1999, the double album The Fragile was released. It was partially successful, garnering generally positive critical reception, but lost money for Reznor's label, so he funded the North American Fragility Tour out of his own pocket. A further six years followed before the next Nine Inch Nails album With Teeth was released. Reznor went into rehab during the time between the two records, and was able to manage his drug addictions. With Teeth reached No. 1 on the Billboard 200. After With Teeth, Reznor released the concept album Year Zero in 2007, which has an alternate reality game themed after the album (see Year Zero (game)) which is about how the current policies of the American government will affect the world in the year 2022. After Year Zero's release, Reznor broke from large record labels and released two albums, Ghosts I–IV and The Slip, independently on his own label, The Null Corporation. In 2009, Nine Inch Nails went on hiatus following the Wave Goodbye Tour. Nine Inch Nails returned to large record labels in 2013, signing with Columbia Records, and releasing the album Hesitation Marks that September.

Atticus Ross, a frequent collaborator of Reznor's since 2002, was announced as an official member of Nine Inch Nails in 2016 – the first and only other official member of the band besides Reznor himself. With Nine Inch Nails's new incarnation as a duo, they released a trilogy of EPs from 2016 to 2018, tied together by a loose concept and spanning a wide variety of musical styles. 2016's Not the Actual Events saw a return to the heavier industrial style of the 1990s, while 2017's Add Violence instead focused on a more electronic sound and 2018's Bad Witch ventured into experimental jazz.

=== Collaboration with other artists ===
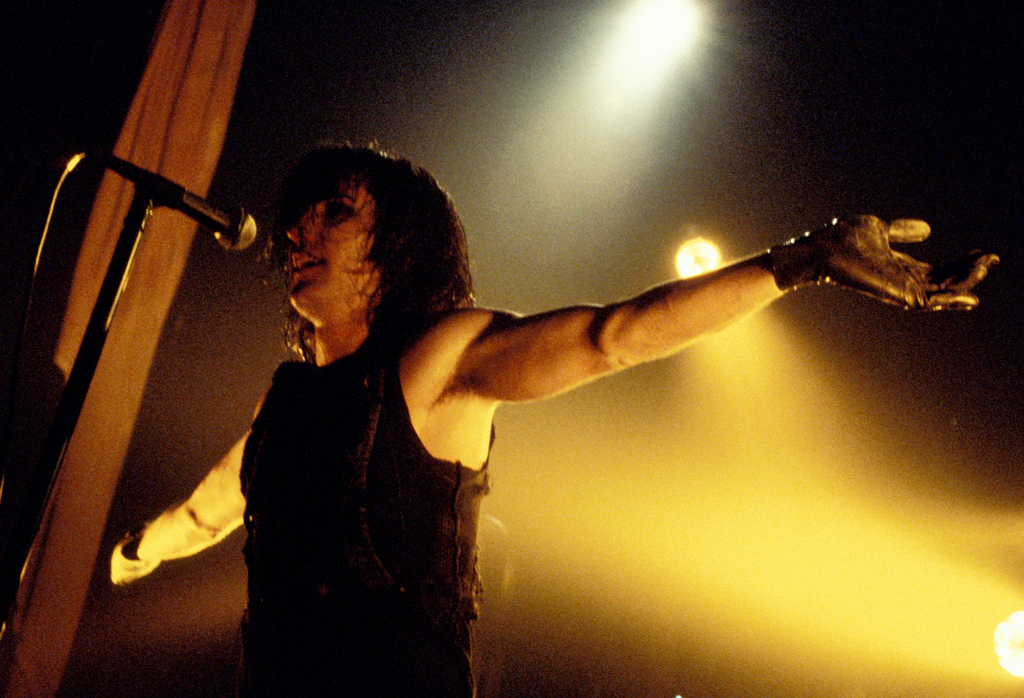
Reznor performing during the Self-Destruct tour, 1994–1995

One of Reznor's earliest collaborations was a Ministry side project in 1990 under the name of 1000 Homo DJs. Reznor sang vocals on a cover of Black Sabbath's "Supernaut". Due to legal issues with his label, Reznor's vocals had to be distorted to make his voice unrecognizable. The band also recorded additional versions with Al Jourgensen doing vocals. While there is still debate as to which version is Reznor and which is Jourgensen, it has been definitively stated that Reznor's vocals were used in the TVT Records's Black Box box set. He also performed with another of Jourgensen's side projects, Revolting Cocks, in 1990. He said: "I saw a whole side of humanity that I didn't know existed. It was decadence on a new level, but with a sense of humor."

Reznor sang the vocals on the 1991 Pigface track "Suck" from their first album Gub, which also featured production work from Steve Albini. Reznor sang backing vocals on "Past the Mission" on Tori Amos's 1994 album Under the Pink. He produced Marilyn Manson's first album, Portrait of an American Family (1994), and several tracks on Manson's Smells Like Children (1995) and Antichrist Superstar (1996). "I went right into doing a Manson record", Reznor recalled of the latter, "which was a way of staying on tour, mentally. Every night was some ridiculous scenario. When that finished, I was really in a low emotional place, disillusioned."

Relations between Reznor and Manson subsequently soured. Manson later said: "I had to make a choice between being friends and having a mediocre career, or breaking things off and continuing to succeed. It got too competitive. And he can't expect me not to want to be more successful than him."

In the video for David Bowie's "I'm Afraid of Americans" (1997), Reznor plays a stalker who shows up wherever Bowie goes. In a 2016 Rolling Stone article after Bowie's death, Reznor recalled how touring with Bowie in 1995–96 inspired Reznor to stay sober.

Reznor produced a remix of The Notorious B.I.G.'s song "Victory", featuring Busta Rhymes, in 1998. Under the name Tapeworm, Reznor collaborated for nearly 10 years with Danny Lohner, Maynard James Keenan, and Atticus Ross, but the project was eventually terminated before any official material was released. The only known released Tapeworm material is a reworked version of a track called "Vacant" (retitled "Passive") on A Perfect Circle's 2004 album eMOTIVe, as well as a track "Potions (Deliverance Mix)" on Puscifer's 2009 remix EP.

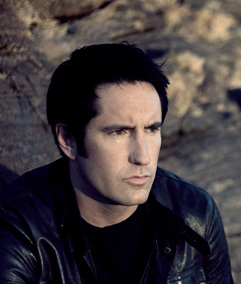
Reznor in March 2008

In 2006, Reznor played his first "solo" shows at Neil Young's annual Bridge School Benefit. Backed by a four piece string section, he performed stripped-down versions of many Nine Inch Nails songs. Reznor featured on El-P's 2007 album I'll Sleep When You're Dead, providing guest vocals on "Flyentology". Reznor co-produced Saul Williams's 2007 album The Inevitable Rise and Liberation of NiggyTardust! after Williams toured with Nine Inch Nails in 2005 and 2006. Reznor convinced Williams to release the album as a free download, while giving fans the option of paying $5 for higher quality files, or downloading all of the songs at a lower quality for free.

Reznor produced songs for Jane's Addiction at his home studio in Beverly Hills, California. The first recordings (new versions of the early tracks "Chip Away" and "Whores") were released simultaneously on Jane's Addiction's website and the NINJA 2009 Tour Sampler digital EP.

In November 2012, Reznor revealed on Reddit that he would be working with Queens of the Stone Age on a song for their sixth studio album, ...Like Clockwork. He had worked with the band once before, providing backing vocals on the title track of the 2007 album Era Vulgaris. Josh Homme has since revealed that Reznor was originally meant to produce the album.

In January 2013, Reznor appeared in a documentary titled Sound City, directed by former Nirvana drummer and Foo Fighters frontman Dave Grohl. Sound City is based on real-life recording studio Sound City Studios, originating in Van Nuys, California. It has housed the works of some of the most famed names in music history since its founding in 1969. The film was chosen as an official selection for the 2013 Sundance Film Festival and was available to download from its official website on February 1, 2013. Reznor also contributed to the soundtrack for the film, on the track "Mantra", along with Dave Grohl and Josh Homme.

Reznor appeared in a live performance with Fleetwood Mac's Lindsey Buckingham, Dave Grohl, and Queens of the Stone Age at the 2014 Grammy Award ceremony. In an interview with a New Zealand media outlet, Reznor explained his thought process at the time that he was considering his participation in the performance:

I spent a long time talking about the pros and cons. You know, "Do we want to be on a shit show on TV?" No, not really. "Do we want to be affiliated with the Grammys?" No, not really. "Would we like to reach a large audience and actually do something with integrity on our terms?" Well, yeah. Let's roll the dice and go into it with the best intentions, with a performance we think is worthy and might–you know–stand out from the crowd. Or it might not!

In 2019, Reznor received a songwriting credit on the Lil Nas X song "Old Town Road", due to the song heavily sampling the 2008 Nine Inch Nails instrumental track "34 Ghosts IV". It reached No. 1 on the Billboard Hot 100 in April 2019, with Reznor and Ross both receiving songwriting and production credit. The song would go on to become the chart's longest-running No. 1 hit, staying at the top for a record 19 weeks. Reznor gave clearance for the use of the sample and expressed support for the song, but declined an invitation to appear in the music video.

In 2017, Reznor and Atticus Ross recorded two songs for the Palestine-located Walled Off Hotel run by Banksy. Reznor also sanctioned prior music for play in the hotel.

In 2020, Reznor collaborated with Tobacco on his fifth studio album Hot Wet and Sassy on the song "Baby Sitter" after they had previously toured together in 2017.

In 2021, it was that revealed Reznor and Atticus Ross would be producing Halsey's fourth studio album If I Can't Have Love, I Want Power. The album was released on August 27, 2021. Reznor and Ross recorded instrumentation and produced the album from a studio in Los Angeles, while Halsey sang at a studio in the Turks and Caicos Islands. The album, which largely abandoned Halsey's usual pop style for a heavier industrial approach, received critical acclaim.

In 2023, Reznor and Ross joined Dave Sitek and Hudson Mohawke to create the virtual supergroup WitchGang. The group's song, "Nothing's Alright", was released in December.

=== How to Destroy Angels ===
In April 2010, it was announced that Reznor had formed a new band with his wife, Mariqueen Maandig, and Atticus Ross, called How to Destroy Angels. The group digitally released a self-titled six song EP on June 1, 2010, with the retail edition becoming available on July 6, 2010. They covered the Bryan Ferry song "Is Your Love Strong Enough?" for the soundtrack for The Girl with the Dragon Tattoo, which was released on December 9, 2011.

On September 21, 2012, Reznor announced that the group's next release would be an EP titled An Omen EP, set for release on Columbia Records in November 2012, and that some of the EP's songs would later appear on the band's first full-length album in 2013. On October 8, 2012, they released a song and music video from An Omen EP titled "Keep it Together". How to Destroy Angels announced in January 2013 that their first full-length album titled Welcome Oblivion would be released on March 5 of the same year.

=== As an independent artist ===
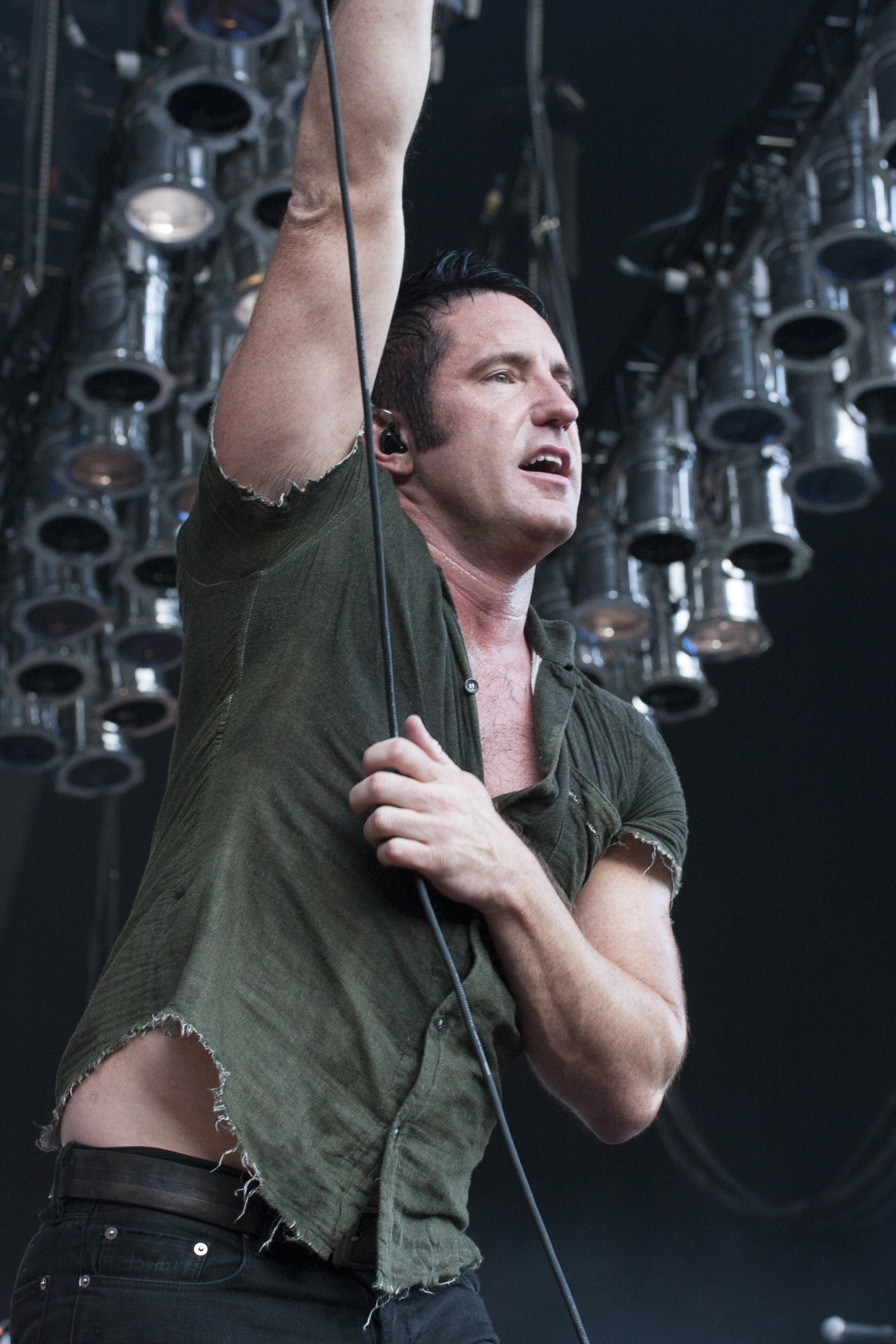
Reznor performing in May 2009

Following the release of Year Zero, Reznor announced later that Nine Inch Nails had split from its contractual obligations with Interscope Records, and would distribute its next major albums independently. In May 2008 Reznor founded The Null Corporation and Nine Inch Nails released the studio album The Slip as a free digital download. In his appreciation for his following and fan base, and having no contractual obligation, he made "The Slip" available for free on his website, stating "This one's on me." A month and a half after its online release, The Slip had been downloaded 1.4 million times from the official Nine Inch Nails website.

In February 2009, Reznor posted his thoughts about the future of Nine Inch Nails on NIN.com, stating that "I've been thinking for some time now it's time to make NIN disappear for a while." Reznor noted in an interview on the official website that while he has not stopped creating music as Nine Inch Nails, the group will not be touring in the foreseeable future.

==== Video games ====
The original music from id Software's 1996 video game Quake is credited to "Trent Reznor and Nine Inch Nails"; Reznor helped record sound effects and ambient audio, and the NIN logo appears on the nailgun ammunition boxes in the game. Reznor's association with id Software began with Reznor being a fan of the original Doom. He reunited with id Software in 2003 as the sound engineer for Doom 3, though due to "time, money and bad management", he had to abandon the project, and his audio work did not make it into the game's final release.

Nine Inch Nails's 2007 major studio recording, Year Zero, was released alongside an accompanying alternate reality game. With its lyrics written from the perspective of multiple fictitious characters, Reznor described Year Zero as a concept album criticizing the United States government's current policies and how they will affect the world 15 years in the future. In July 2012, it was announced that Reznor had composed and performed the theme music for Call of Duty: Black Ops II.

In December 2024, it was announced that Reznor and Ross would score Intergalactic: The Heretic Prophet.

==== Film composition ====
In 1994, Reznor produced the soundtrack for Oliver Stone's film Natural Born Killers, using a portable Pro Tools setup in his hotel room. For the film, Nine Inch Nails recorded a song "Burn". For The Crow soundtrack, the group recorded a cover version of Joy Division's "Dead Souls".

Reznor produced the soundtrack for David Lynch's 1997 film Lost Highway. He produced two pieces of the film's score, "Driver Down" and "Videodrones; Questions", with Peter Christopherson. He tried to get Coil onto the soundtrack, but could not convince Lynch. Nine Inch Nails recorded a song, "The Perfect Drug" for the soundtrack. The release spawned a single, with a music video directed by Mark Romanek.

In 2001, Reznor was asked by Romanek to provide the score for One Hour Photo, but the music did not work for the film and was not used. These compositions eventually evolved into Still. Reznor was credited as "Musical Consultant" on the 2004 film Man on Fire. The movie features six Nine Inch Nails songs. A remix of the Nine Inch Nails track "You Know What You Are?" by Clint Mansell was used as part of the latter's soundtrack to the 2005 film adaptation of Doom. In 2009, Reznor composed "Theme for Tetsuo" for the Japanese cyberpunk film Tetsuo: The Bullet Man directed by Shinya Tsukamoto.

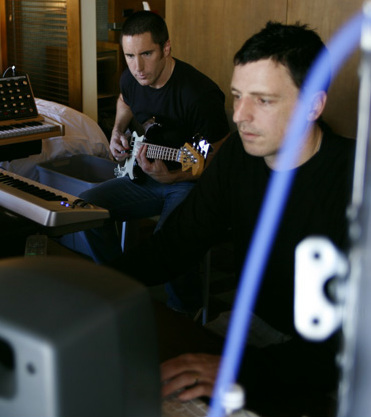
Reznor with Atticus Ross in March 2006

Reznor collaborated with Ross to compose the score for David Fincher's The Social Network, a 2010 drama film about the founding of Facebook. Says Reznor, "When I actually read the script and realized what he was up to, I said goodbye to that free time I had planned." The score was noted for portraying "Mark Zuckerberg the genius, developing a brilliant idea over ominous undertones", and received nearly unanimous praise. The film's score was released in October 2010 in multiple formats, including digital download, compact disc, 5.1 surround on Blu-ray, and vinyl record. A 5-song sampler EP was released for free via digital download.

On January 7, 2011, Reznor announced that he would again be working with Fincher, this time to provide the score for the American adaptation of The Girl with the Dragon Tattoo. A cover of "Immigrant Song" by Led Zeppelin, produced by Reznor and Ross, with Karen O (of the Yeah Yeah Yeahs) as the featured singer, accompanied a trailer for the film. Reznor and Ross's second collaboration with Fincher was scored as the film was shot, based on the concept of "what if we give you music the minute you start to edit stuff together?" Reznor explained in 2014 that the composition process was "a lot more work" and that he "would be hesitant to go as far in that direction in the future".

Reznor and Ross again collaborated to score Fincher's film Gone Girl. Fincher was inspired by music he heard while at an appointment with a chiropractor and tasked Reznor with creating the musical equivalent of an insincere façade. Reznor explained Fincher's request in an interview: "David [Fincher] was at the chiropractor and heard this music that was inauthentically trying to make him feel OK, and that became a perfect metaphor for this film. [...] The challenge was, simply, what is the musical equivalent of the same sort of façade of comfort and a feeling of insincerity that that music represented? [My primary aim was] to instill doubt [and] remind you that things aren't always what they seem to be." Richard Butler of The Psychedelic Furs sang a cover version of the song "She", which was used in the film's teaser trailer. The soundtrack album was released on the Columbia label on September 30, 2014.

During Reznor and Ross's keynote session at the 2014 "Billboard and Hollywood Reporter Film & TV Music Conference", held on November 5, Reznor said that he is open to working with other filmmakers besides Fincher, the only director he had worked with as a composer up until that point: "I'm open to any possibility. [...] Scoring for film kind of came up unexpectedly. It was always something I'd been interested in and it was really a great experience and I've learned a lot." Reznor further explained that he cherishes his previous experiences with Fincher as "there's a pursuit and dedication to uncompromised excellence".

In December 2014, it was announced that Reznor would collaborate with composer Mike Patton, best known as the frontman of alternative metal band Faith No More, on The Girl Who Played With Fire by Fincher, the sequel to 2011's The Girl with the Dragon Tattoo. However, after the release of the 2015 book The Girl in the Spider's Web, a part of the series from which the films are based, Sony decided to reboot the franchise and cancelled this production.

Reznor and Ross have gone on to score films by a number of other directors, starting in 2016 with Fisher Stevens's climate change documentary Before the Flood (whose score also included compositions by Gustavo Santaolalla and Mogwai) and Peter Berg's Patriots Day, a crime drama about the Boston Marathon bombings. The following year, they made their television debut with the score for Ken Burns and Lynn Novick's documentary series The Vietnam War. In 2018, Reznor and Ross scored Jonah Hill's directorial debut Mid90s, as well as Susanne Bier's Bird Box, which was released on Netflix. Reznor and Ross also released a 2-hour box set for the Bird Box soundtrack containing additional material from their recording sessions, titled Bird Box/Null 09 Extended. Reznor later admitted his dissatisfaction with working on Bird Box during an interview for the December 2019 edition of Revolver, calling the experience a "fucking waste of time". He criticized the film's editing department for mixing the score too low in the final cut of the film, as well as the production team overall for "phoning in" the project. Reznor also revealed that he and Ross pulled out of scoring Joe Wright's The Woman in the Window, having scrapped their completed score due to displeasure with the studio's "transformation" of the film following test screenings. The film was ultimately sold to Netflix and released in 2021, with Danny Elfman replacing Reznor and Ross as composer.

In 2019, Reznor and Ross composed the score for the independent drama Waves, and later that year made their second contribution to television with their score for Damon Lindelof's HBO miniseries Watchmen, a sequel to Alan Moore's original 1987 comic series. Reznor and Ross, both fans of the comic, approached Lindelof to work on the series, and released three volumes of music from the series over the course of its broadcast. The score was critically acclaimed, and Reznor and Ross won the Primetime Emmy Award for Outstanding Music Composition for a Limited Series in 2020.

In 2020, Reznor and Ross reunited with Fincher to score his drama film Mank as well as scoring their first animated project, Pixar's Soul. In 2021, the two won a Golden Globe and an Academy Award alongside Jon Batiste for their work on the Soul score.

In 2022, Reznor and Ross scored Luca Guadagnino's Bones and All, as well as Sam Mendes's Empire of Light. In 2023, the duo scored their second animated project, Teenage Mutant Ninja Turtles: Mutant Mayhem, and reunited with Fincher for The Killer. In 2024, Reznor and Ross scored two films by Guadagnino: Challengers, and Queer. The two also composed the title theme for the HBO comedy series The Franchise; Mendes served as executive producer on the project, and directed the pilot.

In 2025, Reznor and Ross scored the sci-fi sequel Tron: Ares under the Nine Inch Nails moniker. The same year, the two also scored Scott Derrickson's The Gorge, as well as Guadagnino's After the Hunt.

== Business activity ==
=== Dispute with John Malm ===
In 2004, Reznor's former manager John Malm Jr. filed a suit against Reznor for over $2 million (~$3.26 million in 2025) in deferred commissions. The suit alleged that Reznor "reneged on every single contract he and Malm ever entered into" and that Reznor refused to pay Malm money to which he was contractually entitled. Weeks later, Reznor filed a counter-suit in the U.S. District Court of New York, charging Malm with fraud and breach of fiduciary duties. Reznor's suit arose from a five-year management contract signed in the early days of Nine Inch Nails, between Reznor and Malm's management company J. Artist Management. This contract, according to the suit, was unlawful and immoral in that it secured Malm 20% of Reznor's gross earnings, rather than his net earnings, as is the standard practice between artists and their management. The suit also alleged that the contract secured this percentage even if Malm was no longer representing Reznor, and for all Reznor's album advances. The suit also described how Malm had misappropriated the ownership rights regarding Nine Inch Nails, including the trademark name "NIИ". According to testimony by Malm, Reznor gave him half of the "NIИ" trademark "as a gift".

Reznor stated that he began to fully understand his financial situation after tackling his drug addiction. Reznor requested a financial statement from Malm in 2003, only to discover that he had only $400,000 (~$669,939 in 2025) in liquid assets. He told the court, "It was not pleasant discovering you have a tenth as much as you've been told you have." Malm's lawyers, however, claimed that Malm had worked for years "pro bono", and that Reznor's inability to release an album or tour and his uninhibited spending were the reasons for Reznor's financial situation. After a three-week trial in 2005, jurors sided with Reznor, awarding him upwards of $2.95 million and returning to him complete control of his trademarks. After adjustment for inflation, Reznor's award rose to nearly $5 million.

=== Beats Music ===
In January 2013, Reznor and TopSpin Media founder Ian Rogers were chosen to head Beats Electronics's new music subscription service, Project Daisy, described by Beats co-founder Jimmy Iovine as having "hardware, brand, distribution partnerships, and artist relations to differentiate Daisy from the competition". There was some speculation as to what Reznor's role would be within the company, but he was later named chief creative officer. He promised that he and the other members would strive to create a music subscription service that will be like "having your own guy when you go to the record store, who knows what you like but can also point you down some paths you wouldn't have necessarily encountered". The service was officially launched in the United States on January 21, 2014.

Reznor continued on in a similar role under Beats's new ownership at Apple, where he was involved in the launch of Apple Music. He later left Apple, noting working there "felt at odds with the artist in me."

=== Future Ruins festival ===
In May 2025, Reznor and Ross announced a one-day music and arts festival Future Ruins, to be held in November 2025 at the Los Angeles Equestrian Center. The event, organized by a special-purpose entity Future Remains, focuses on film score composers along with DJ sets of electronic music.

The billed artists included John Carpenter, Danny Elfman, Ben Salisbury and Geoff Barrow, Claudio Simonetti's Goblin, Cristobal Tapia de Veer, and Volker Bertelmann aka Hauschka.

The festival was cancelled on October 3, 2025 due to "logistical challenges and complications."

== Criticism of the music industry ==
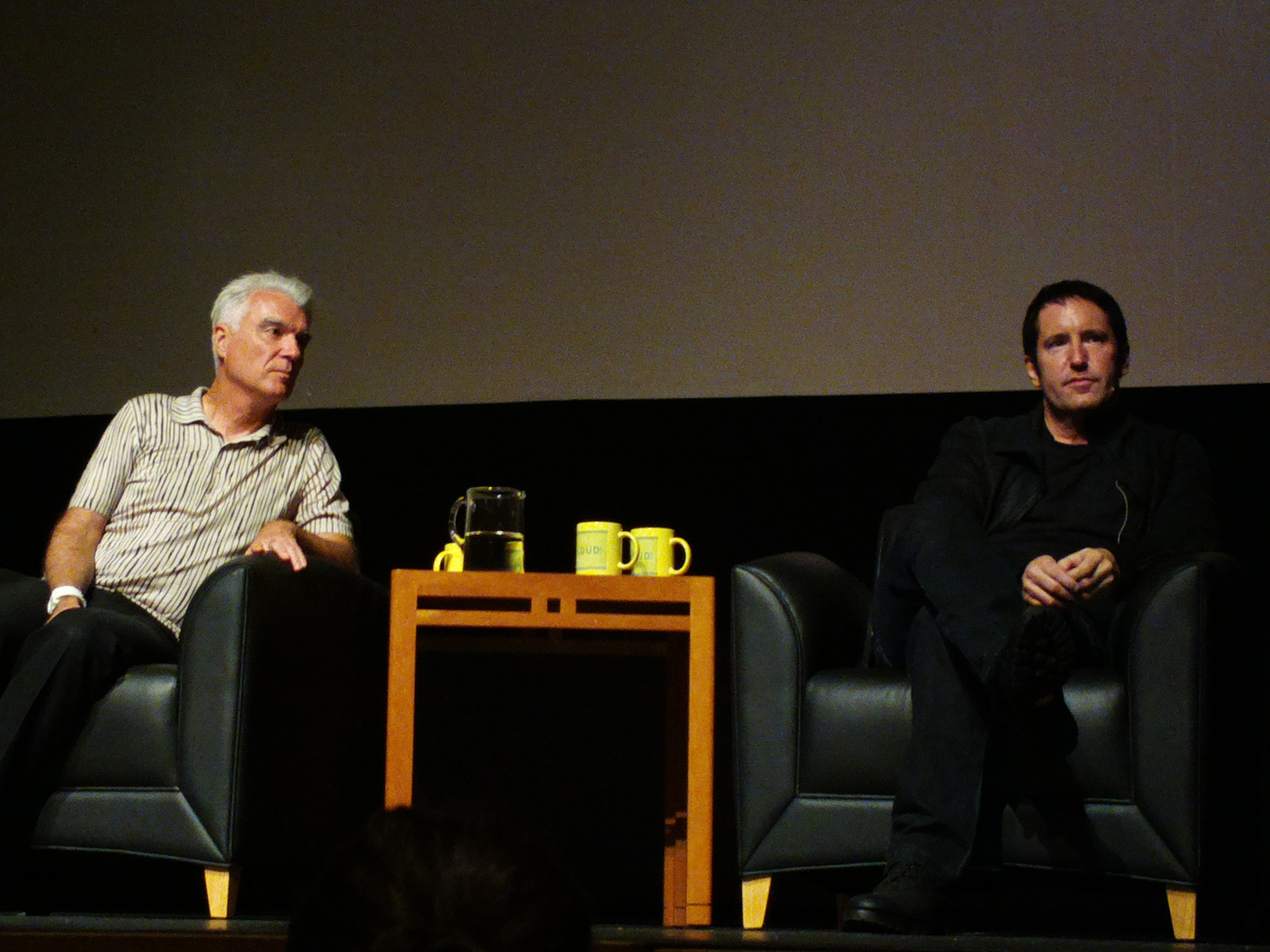
Reznor (right) discussing his return to major labels at an October 2012 panel with David Byrne

In May 2007, Reznor made a post on the official Nine Inch Nails website condemning Universal Music Group—the parent company of the band's record label, Interscope Records—for their pricing and distribution plans for Nine Inch Nails's 2007 album Year Zero. He labeled the company's retail pricing of Year Zero in Australia as "ABSURD", concluding that "as a reward for being a 'true fan' you get ripped off". Reznor went on to say that as "the climate grows more and more desperate for record labels, their answer to their mostly self-inflicted wounds seems to be to screw the consumer over even more." Reznor's post, specifically his criticism of the recording industry at large, elicited considerable media attention. In September 2007, Reznor continued his attack on Universal Music Group at a concert in Australia, urging fans there to "steal" his music online instead of purchasing it legally. Reznor went on to encourage the crowd to "steal and steal and steal some more and give it to all your friends and keep on stealin'."

While on tour in Prague in 2009, Reznor considered the marketing aspect of a major label when he saw a lot of promotion for Radiohead's then-upcoming tour, contrasting with little promotion for his current Nine Inch Nails tour or any of its recently released albums. At a 2012 panel discussion with David Byrne and Josh Kun, Reznor stated that the marketing from a major label outweighed the aspects of being independent that he liked, namely the ability to release albums whenever he wanted to avoid leaking and to take a larger cut of the profits from record sales. Reznor's first album released through a major label after his return was How to Destroy Angels's An Omen EP released in November 2012 through Columbia Records. On working with Columbia for the release of the EP, Reznor said that "so far it's been pleasantly pleasant".

In 2013, Reznor returned to Columbia Records for Hesitation Marks, the eighth Nine Inch Nails studio album. On the Columbia release of Hesitation Marks, Reznor has stated: "I'm trying to make the best thing I can make... and I also want as many people as possible to be aware that it's out there."

== Influences and musical style ==
Reznor possesses a baritone vocal range. Reznor was initially inspired to create music after seeing the Eagles perform in 1976. He would later recall, "The excitement of the night struck a chord with me and I remember thinking, 'Someday I'd love to be up on that stage.'" Upon forming Nine Inch Nails, Reznor stated that he was initially influenced most by the Clash, even outright trying to imitate them. Another early influence was English musician Gary Numan, with Reznor once saying that he knew he wanted to make music with synthesizers after hearing Numan's song "Cars". This was exemplified years later on the Nine Inch Nails song "Only" of 2005, whose disco-style beats and synthesizers draw from Numan's style. Other English synth-pop acts, including Soft Cell and OMD, gained a foothold on American radio during Reznor's youth, and became influential on his musical trajectory. Reznor mentioned that college radio introduced him to acts such as the English gothic rock band Bauhaus (naming their lead singer, Peter Murphy, as one of his idols), as well as the English bands Joy Division and Throbbing Gristle, which were very inspirational for him. Reznor also said he saw the first Nine Inch Nails song he wrote, "Down in It", as a "total rip-off" of the 1986 song "Dig It" by Canadian band Skinny Puppy.

Reznor's work was described by People magazine in 1995 as "self-loathing, sexual obsession, torture and suicide over a thick sludge of gnashing guitars and computer-synthesized beats". The magazine also said that "[Reznor], like Alice Cooper and Ozzy Osbourne before him, has built his name on theatrics and nihilism". Nine Inch Nails concerts were often picketed by fundamentalist Christians. Despite the gloomy public image that surrounded Reznor from then on, his former high school band director considered him to be "very upbeat and friendly" in reality and theorized that "all that 'dark avenging angel' stuff is marketing". Conversely, the owner of the recording studio where Reznor recorded the album Pretty Hate Machine said of Reznor's "pain-driven" stage act, "It's planned, but it is not contrived. He's pulling that stuff out from inside somewhere. You cannot fake that delivery." Pain and sorrow came to be regarded as such defining elements of Reznor's music that a group of fans once responded to the news that his dog had died with comments like "it's good for his music when he is depressed" and that "it's good to see [Reznor] back in Hell, where he belongs".

Reznor expressed the significant influence that English experimental band Coil had on his work, saying that their 1986 album Horse Rotorvator was "deeply influential". In many interviews, he has also mentioned important influences on him from American, English, Irish, and Scottish acts such as The Cars, Devo, The Jesus and Mary Chain, My Bloody Valentine, Pere Ubu, Prince, Ministry, Test Dept, Cabaret Voltaire and The Cure's 1985 album, The Head on the Door. According to American musician Todd Rundgren, Reznor told him that he listened to Rundgren's 1973 album A Wizard, a True Star with "great regularity".

Reznor also cited English band Depeche Mode, in particular their 1986 album Black Celebration, as a major influence on his beginnings. In 2017, he recalled:

It was the summer of '86. I'd dropped out of college and was living in Cleveland trying to find my way in the local music scene. I knew where I wanted to go with my life but I didn't know how to get there. A group of friends and I drove down to Blossom Music Center amphitheatre to see the Black Celebration tour. DM was one of our favorite bands and the Black Celebration record took my love for them to a new level. I've thought about that night a lot over the years. It was a perfect summer night and I was in exactly the right place I was supposed to be. The music, the energy, the audience, the connection... it was spiritual and truly magic. I left that show grateful, humbled, energized, focused, and in awe of how powerful and transformative music can be... and I started writing what would eventually become Pretty Hate Machine. Many times, particularly when we're playing an amphitheatre, I'll think of that show while I'm onstage and hope someone in the audience is in the midst of a perfect summer night feeling how DM made me feel so many years ago.

A longtime fan of English musician David Bowie, Reznor has ranked Bowie's 1977 album Low as one of his favorite albums and said that he listened to it constantly during the recording of The Downward Spiral for inspiration. In 1995, Nine Inch Nails toured as a co-headlining act on the North American leg of Bowie's 1995 Outside Tour. Reznor also appeared in Bowie's video for "I'm Afraid of Americans" as Bowie's stalker, and made several remixes for the single release of the song (as well as a remix of "The Hearts Filthy Lesson"). The two came to consider each other friends.

In Rush: Beyond the Lighted Stage Reznor said that Canadian band Rush had played a major part in his childhood, that he considered Rush to be "one of the best bands ever" and that he had gained a perspective on how keyboards could be introduced into hard rock after listening to their 1982 album Signals.

== Legacy ==
Reznor's work as Nine Inch Nails has influenced many newer artists, which according to Reznor range from "generic imitations" dating from the band's initial success to younger bands echoing his style in a "truer, less imitative way". Following the release of The Downward Spiral, mainstream artists began to take notice of Nine Inch Nails' influence: David Bowie compared NIN's impact to that of The Velvet Underground. In 1997, Reznor appeared in Time magazine's list of the year's most influential people, and Spin magazine described him as "the most vital artist in music". Bob Ezrin, producer for Pink Floyd, Kiss, Alice Cooper, and Peter Gabriel, described Reznor in 2007 as a "true visionary" and advised aspiring artists to take note of his no-compromise attitude. During an appearance at the Kerrang! Awards in London that year, Reznor accepted the Kerrang! Icon, honoring Nine Inch Nails' long-standing influence on rock music.

Guns N' Roses frontman Axl Rose, an early supporter of Nine Inch Nails, was heavily influenced by Reznor in the writing and composition of the band's Chinese Democracy album. Steven Wilson of progressive rock band Porcupine Tree has stated that he is influenced by and much admires Reznor's production work, in particular The Fragile, and in 2008 said that "[Reznor] is the only one [he'd] let near [his] music". Indonesian singer Anggun said that Reznor was "the man of my musical life", and that The Fragile was "the album that changed my life." Writing for Revolver magazine on the 25th anniversary of Broken, musician Greg Puciato stated that one of the few vivid musical memories of his teenage years was listening to the EP at age 12, front-to-back, in the first digipak he had seen. Later, after discovering the story behind its release, it became a giant influence on him, particularly "when it comes to [his] own artistic path or output". Timbaland has cited Reznor as his favorite studio producer. Drummer Chris Pennie of the Dillinger Escape Plan said The Fragile changed his compositional mindset from drums to production, as he was "blown away" by its dense yet elegant mix and vocal ideas. He called it one of his two favorite albums of all time.

== Personal life ==
Reznor suffered from depression over the five years following the release of The Downward Spiral in 1994, which was worsened by the death of his maternal grandmother, who raised him; he began abusing alcohol, cocaine, and other drugs, attempting rehab but failing. While on tour in London in 2000, he overdosed on China White, a fentanyl analog he had mistaken for cocaine. He returned to rehab and completed it in 2001. He said in 2006, "There was a persona that had run its course. I needed to get my priorities straight, my head screwed on. [...] I took a couple of years off, just to figure out who I was and working out if I wanted to keep doing this or not." He also said that he was now "pretty happy".

Reznor lived for many years in the Garden District of New Orleans until 2005, when he sold his home to actor John Goodman and moved to Los Angeles. He married Filipino-American singer Mariqueen Maandig in October 2009. They live in Los Angeles and have six children together.

== Discography ==
Nine Inch Nails

Main article: Nine Inch Nails discography
- Pretty Hate Machine (1989)
- Broken (EP, 1992)
- The Downward Spiral (1994)
- Quake (1996)
- The Fragile (1999)
- With Teeth (2005)
- Year Zero (2007)
- Ghosts I–IV (2008)
- The Slip (2008)
- Hesitation Marks (2013)
- Not the Actual Events (EP, 2016)
- Add Violence (EP, 2017)
- Bad Witch (2018)
- Ghosts V: Together (2020)
- Ghosts VI: Locusts (2020)
- Tron: Ares (2025)

How to Destroy Angels

Main article: How to Destroy Angels discography
- How to Destroy Angels (EP, 2010)
- An Omen (EP, 2012)
- Welcome Oblivion (2013)

with Atticus Ross

- The Social Network (2010)
- The Girl with the Dragon Tattoo (2011)
- Gone Girl (2014)
- Before the Flood (2016)^{[a]}
- Patriots Day (2017)
- The Vietnam War (2017)
- Mid90s (EP, 2018)
- Bird Box (2018)
- Watchmen (2019)
- Waves (2019)
- Mank (2020)
- Soul (2020)^{[b]}
- Bones and All (2022)
- Empire of Light (2022)
- Teenage Mutant Ninja Turtles: Mutant Mayhem (2023)
- The Killer (2023)
- Challengers (2024)
- Queer (2024)
- The Gorge (2025)
- After the Hunt (2025)
- The Further Mis-Adventures of Cliff Booth (2026)
- Slayground (2027) - Post-production

Notes

- ^{^[a]} score includes original recordings by Mogwai and Gustavo Santaolalla
- ^{^[b]} score includes original songs by Jon Batiste

== Awards and nominations ==
In 2011, Reznor and Ross won the Golden Globe Award for Best Original Score and the Academy Award for Best Original Score for their work on The Social Network.

For their work on The Girl with the Dragon Tattoo, Reznor and Ross were nominated for the 2012 Golden Globe Award for Best Original Score, and won the 2013 Grammy Award for Best Score Soundtrack for Visual Media. Neither man was present to accept the award; Reznor, who has a contentious history with the Grammys, simply tweeted, "Why thanks, y'all."

Ross and Reznor's Gone Girl score was nominated for Best Original Score in a Feature Film at the 5th Hollywood Music in Media Awards (HMMA)—the award was eventually won by Antonio Sanchez for Birdman on November 4, 2014. In a November 2014 interview with The Hollywood Reporter, Reznor revealed that he values Oscar trophies above Grammy awards: "When the Oscar [nomination] came up, it felt very different. I can't tell if that's because I'm older or it felt like it's coming from a more sincere pedigree."

Reznor and Ross won the Primetime Emmy Award for Outstanding Music Composition for a Limited Series and were nominated for Outstanding Original Music and Lyrics for their work on the series Watchmen. In 2021, they won their second Golden Globe Award for Best Original Score (this time shared with Jon Batiste) and second Academy Award for Best Original Score, both for the Pixar film Soul. In 2025, Reznor and Ross won a third Golden Globe for Best Original Score, for their work in Challengers (2024).

Awards
Preceded by Jim Lauderdale	AMA Song of the Year (Songwriter); 2003	Succeeded by Rodney Crowell
