= How to Destroy Angels (band) =

American post-industrial band

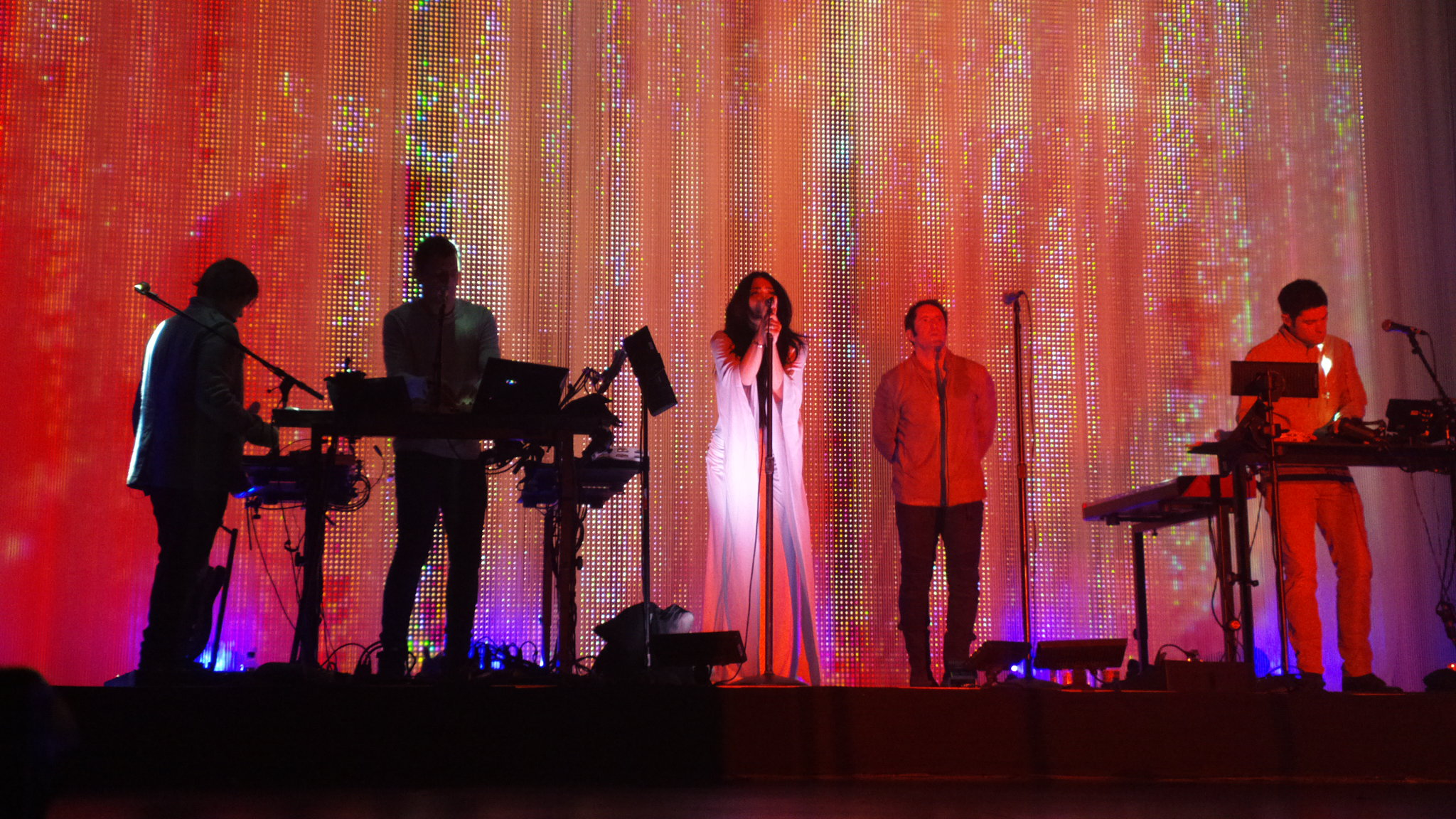
- How to Destroy Angels performing in April 2013; from left to right: Alessandro Cortini, Atticus Ross, Mariqueen Maandig, Trent Reznor, and Rob Sheridan

Background information
- Genres: Post-industrial; experimental; electronica
- Years active: 2009–2015 (hiatus)
- Labels: The Null Corporation; Columbia
- Members: Trent Reznor; Atticus Ross; Mariqueen Maandig; Rob Sheridan; Alessandro Cortini (Touring)
- Website: howtodestroyangels.com

How to Destroy Angels is an American post-industrial band formed in 2009 by Nine Inch Nails members Trent Reznor and Atticus Ross alongside former West Indian Girl member (and Reznor's wife) Mariqueen Maandig and longtime Nine Inch Nails collaborator Rob Sheridan. The group is named for the 1984 Coil EP. Alessandro Cortini joined the lineup for the duration of the 2013 tour.

== Releases ==
The band's first release was a self-titled EP released on June 1, 2010. The band released a single from the album, "A Drowning", as digital downloadable content, and a second song, "The Space in Between," debuted as a music video on Pitchfork on May 14, 2010. A third track, "The Believers," was made available through Wired magazine's iPad application, along with a dissection and breakdown of the song, and through a free digital download from the official website. "The Believers" is also featured on the soundtrack of the 2011 film Limitless.

The band recorded a cover version of Bryan Ferry's "Is Your Love Strong Enough?" which was released December 9, 2011 on the soundtrack for The Girl with the Dragon Tattoo.

In November 2012, the band's second EP, An Omen EP was released on Columbia Records. The song "Keep It Together" from the EP was released as a single on October 9, 2012. A music video for the song was directed by the band themselves. Two other songs from An Omen EP were also given music videos: "Ice Age", directed by John Hillcoat, and "The Loop Closes", which was also directed by the band.

The band's debut studio album, Welcome Oblivion, was released on March 5, 2013, through Columbia Records. It included the tracks "Keep It Together", "Ice Age", "On the Wing", and "The Loop Closes" from An Omen EP. A deluxe edition of the album also included the How to Destroy Angels EP.

The first single from Welcome Oblivion, "How Long?", was released on January 31, 2013, along with a music video directed by Shynola.

== Personnel ==
Current

- Trent Reznor – co-lead vocals, guitars, keyboards, synthesizer, programming (2010–present)
- Atticus Ross – keyboards, synthesizer, programming (2010–present)
- Mariqueen Maandig – co-lead vocals, keyboards, tambourine (2010–present)
- Rob Sheridan – synthesizer, programming, backing vocals (2013–present)

Touring

- Alessandro Cortini – keyboards, synthesizer, programming, bass, backing vocals (2013)

== Discography ==
How to Destroy Angels discography
- How to Destroy Angels logo
- Studio albums: 1
- Extended plays: 2
- Singles: 3
- Music videos: 5

=== Albums ===
==== Studio albums ====
List of studio albums, with selected chart positions
Title	Album details	Peak chart positions						
Title	Album details	US	US Alt.	US Dance	BEL (FL)	BEL (WA)	SWI	UK
Welcome Oblivion	Released: March 5, 2013 (US); Label: Columbia; Formats: CD, LP, digital download	30	8	2	118	123	76	101

==== EPs ====
List of EPs, with selected chart positions
Title	EP details	Peak chart positions				
Title	EP details	US	US Alt.	US Dance	US Indie	UK DL
How to Destroy Angels	Released: June 1, 2010 (US); Label: The Null Corporation; Formats: CD, 10", digital download	151	—	8	22	—
An Omen EP	Released: November 13, 2012 (US); Label: Columbia; Formats: 12", digital download	42	10	1	—	84
"—" denotes a recording that did not chart or was not released in that territory.

=== Singles ===
List of singles, with selected chart positions
Title	Year	Peak chart positions	Album
Title	Year	US Dance Digi.	Album
"A Drowning"	2010	20	How to Destroy Angels
"Keep It Together"	2012	—	An Omen EP
"How Long?"	2013	—	Welcome Oblivion
"—" denotes a recording that did not chart or was not released in that territory.

=== Other appearances ===
Title	Year	Album
"Is Your Love Strong Enough?"	2011	The Girl with the Dragon Tattoo

=== Music videos ===
Title	Year	Director(s)
"The Space in Between"	2010	Rupert Sanders
"Keep It Together"	2012	How to Destroy Angels
"Ice Age"	2012	John Hillcoat
"The Loop Closes"	2013	How to Destroy Angels
"How Long?"	2013	Shynola
