= Lia Vollack =

American record executive (born c. 1965)

Lia Vollack (born c. 1965) is an American record executive.

Vollack graduated from high school at 15, and the year after worked as a roadie for Johnnie Thunders and the Ramones. In 1974 she moved to New York City, where she would find work as a sound designer for Broadway and Off-Broadway shows such as On the Waterfront and The Heidi Chronicles; she continued working as a sound effects freelancer and music editor until 1997, when she was hired by Sony. In 2000 she became executive director of the Worldwide Music division of Sony Pictures Entertainment, in which role she was in charge of releasing successful soundtracks to films such as Charlie's Angels. She has since become the main force behind the release of soundtracks and film scores for films released by Sony Pictures. She is creator of the record label Madison Gate, dedicated to publishing film music that might otherwise go unreleased, and has been named to the Billboard Power 100 list on multiple occasions.

In early 2011, Vollack suggested to the James Bond film producers at Eon Productions that they ask Adele to record the theme song for their next Bond film, later revealed to be titled Skyfall (2012). Vollack thought that Adele would be a good choice to ask to record a Bond theme song because her music had a "soulful, haunting, evocative quality", which Vollack considered would bring back the "classic Shirley Bassey feel" associated with several early Bond films. The song "Skyfall" went on to win the Academy Award for Best Original Song, Brit Award for British Single, Critics' Choice Movie Award for Best Song, Golden Globe Award for Best Original Song, and the Grammy Award for Best Song Written for Visual Media, making it the first Bond theme to win all the aforementioned awards.

In 2016 Vollack was named president of Columbia Live Stage, the live entertainment arm of Sony Pictures Entertainment. She is married to set designer Derek McLane, and is stepmother to his three children.

In 2021 she served as the producer of MJ The Musical, a new Michael Jackson Dance Show on Broadway.

== Awards ==
- Billboard Women in Music Top Executives List - 2013, 2014, 2015
