= Rob Sheridan =

American graphic designer

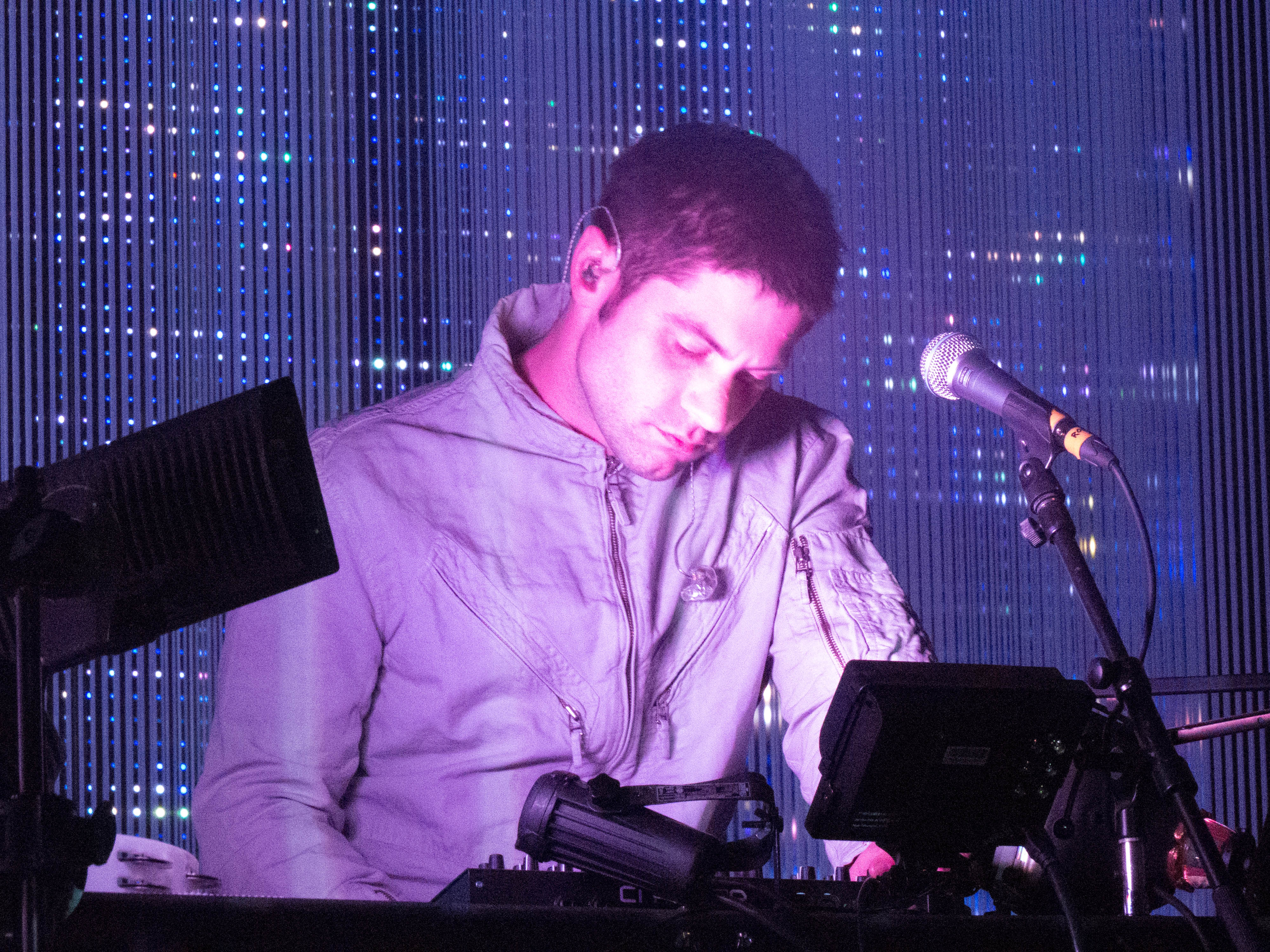
- Rob Sheridan with How to Destroy Angels in 2013
- Born: Robert Sheridan; October 11, 1979 (age 47)
- Education: Pratt Institute
- Known for: art director, graphic designer, writer, photographer, comic book author

Robert Sheridan (born October 11, 1979) is an American artist, creative director, stage visual designer, photographer, and comic book author known for his extensive work in the music and entertainment industries and with the bands Nine Inch Nails and Pearl Jam. He is widely known as a designer of stage visuals. He is also an apparel designer, and founder of Glitch Goods.

== Biography ==
In April 1997, when Sheridan was 17, he created a website dedicated to the Dancing Baby animation, contributing to its popularity as an early internet meme.

Sheridan attended art school at New York's Pratt Institute for one year before being hired at age 19 by Nine Inch Nails' Trent Reznor in 1999, on the merits of a Nine Inch Nails fansite he created during high school. He was initially hired to maintain the newly launched official Nine Inch Nails website. He then also took over as art director for the band, contributing photography, web design, album covers, music videos, live tour visuals, and two live concert films. His tenure as art director spanned from 1999 to 2014. He was also credited for assisting Trent Reznor with the mythology of the alternate reality game built around Nine Inch Nails' 2007 album Year Zero. The album evokes a dystopian world where art is a form of resistance, with crackdowns on "disobedience" and "subversive materials".

In 2010, Sheridan co-founded the band How to Destroy Angels. He featured on all the studio releases, as well as touring with the band in 2013.

Sheridan is most widely known for his signature glitch art style where he manipulates images and photographs to produce new works. He did the artwork for Nine Inch Nails’ The Social Network, which underwent revision at Sony’s request. He has been perfecting his custom analog glitch process over the past several years, continuously refining and expanding the technique. The current methodology involves recording imagery onto deliberately damaged VHS tapes using old VCRs, which are then connected to vintage CRT televisions. This process allows him to manipulate the visuals in unique ways, creating his distinctive glitch art. He is also well-recognized for his work in illustration, photography, graphic design, and as the director, editor, and director of photography responsible for concert films, as well as a director for the 2005 Nine Inch Nails music video The Hand That Feeds.

In 2018, Sheridan announced that he would be writing a comic book through the new launch of Vertigo on DC Comics, called High Level. The book was released in 2019. He collaborated for a score for this series with Steven Alexander Ryan and Justin McGrath, his coworkers from the Nine Inch Nails’ Twenty Thirteen Tour. Additionally, Sheridan is a co-inventor listed on a patent for a playlist distribution system within a music service, assigned to Apple Inc.

== Work with Nine Inch Nails ==
- Things Falling Apart (2000 album) – graphic designer
- And All That Could Have Been (2002 concert film) – director, editor, director of photography
- "The Hand That Feeds" (2005 music video) – director, editor
- With Teeth (2005 album) – art director
- Beside You in Time (2007 concert film) – director, editor, art director
- "Survivalism" (2007 music video) – co-director
- Year Zero (2007 album) – art director
- Ghosts I–IV (2008 album) – art director
- The Slip (2008 album) – art director
- Lights in the Sky (2008 tour) – art director
- Pretty Hate Machine (2010 reissue) – art director
- Hesitation Marks (2013 album) – art director
- Twenty Thirteen (2013–14 tour) – art director

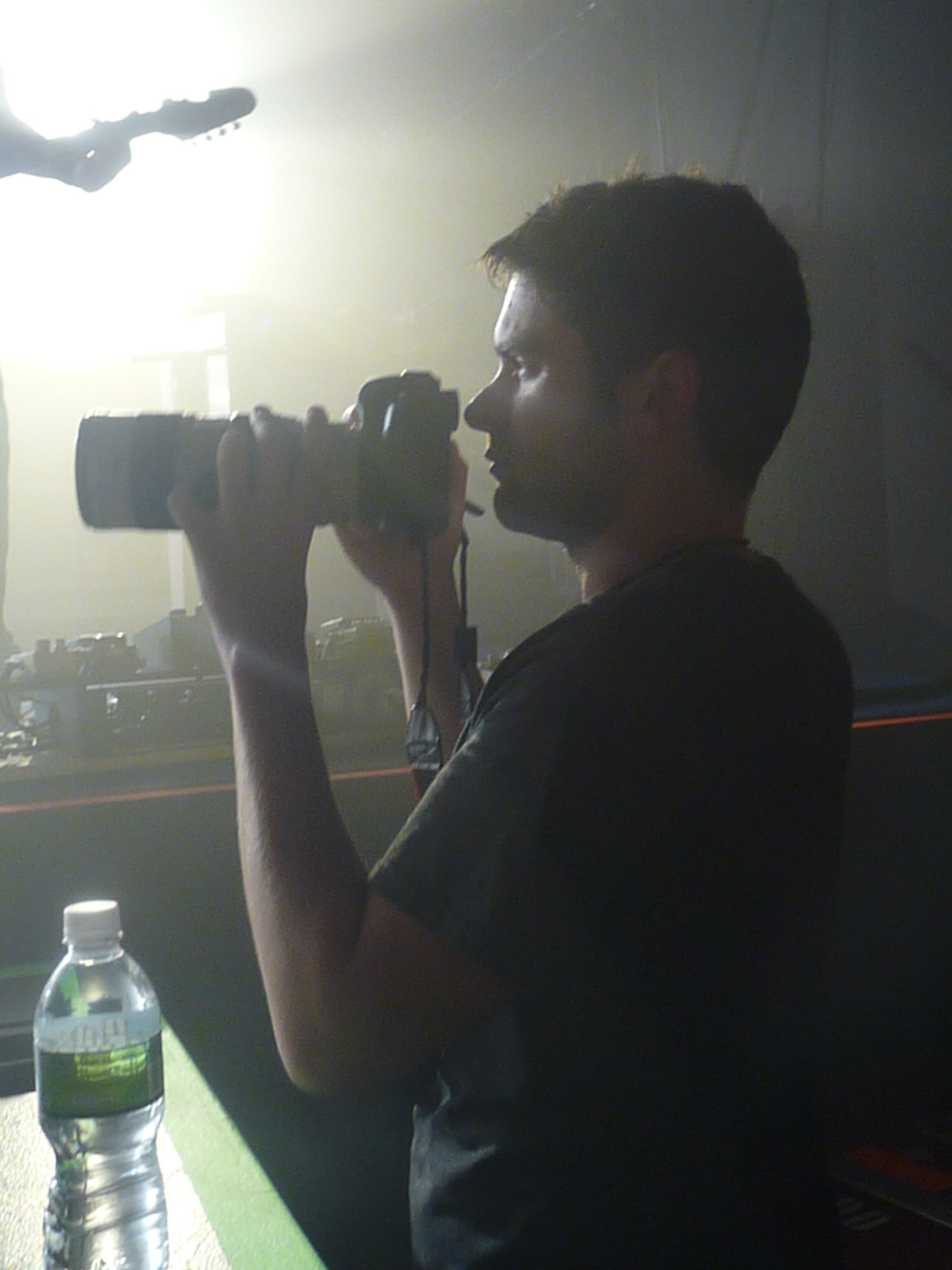
Rob Sheridan on the set of Nine Inch Nails' "Wave Goodbye", August 26, 2009

== Creative direction ==
Sheridan had been working with Trent Reznor for his other band How to Destroy Angels as the art director and was responsible for the visual design of the band’s live tour in April 2013. He also created the artwork/package for the soundtrack release of the Academy Award-winning and Golden Globe-winning score for The Social Network, composed by Trent Reznor and Atticus Ross.

Sheridan has explored alternate reality games and AI art, going viral in May 2022 with an AI-generated art piece. In 2023, he circulated images of a supposed satanic fashion show, which sparked a flurry of social media posts from people who thought it was a genuine New York Fashion Week event. The images were 100 percent computer generated with AI and Photoshop, through a chain of all-digital processes summarized under the term "syntography".

Sheridan has also been long known for his work shooting, directing, and editing for other artists and musicians. In 2015, Sheridan shot, directed, and edited a video for the band The Black Queen called "Ice To Never". He has also worked with David Fincher on the soundtrack for the Girl with the Dragon Tattoo, and Maynard James Keenan, creating visuals and ambience for Puscifer's 2015-2017 shows.

=== Live stage visuals ===
In 2024, Sheridan worked with Pearl Jam to create the live stage visuals for their 2024/2025 Dark Matter tour. He set up a lab, to capture chemical reactions and light interactions at 1,000 frames per second using a macro lens. This marked the band's first use of such video visuals on tour, with Sheridan's work also appearing in their "Wreckage" live music video.

== Recognition ==
In December 2008, in recognition for his work in art direction on the Ghosts I–IV box set, Sheridan was nominated for a Grammy award for "Best Box Set or Limited Edition Package" and in 2013 for The Girl with the Dragon Tattoo.

== See also ==
- List of glitch artists
