= Trent Reznor discography =

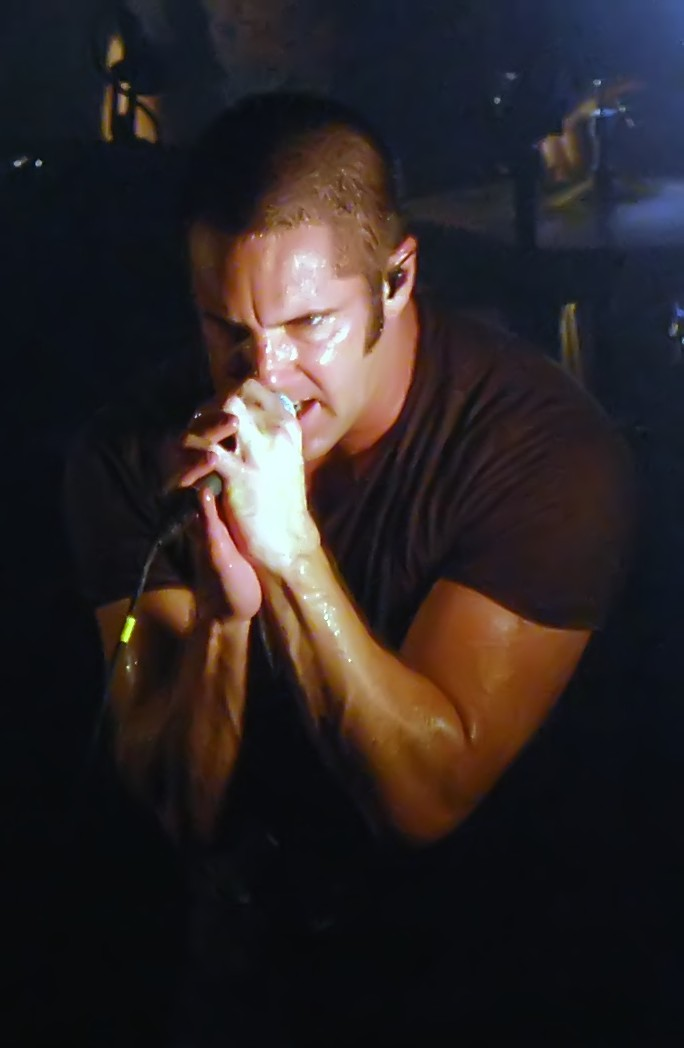
Reznor in 2009

This is a comprehensive discography of Trent Reznor, an American musician, singer, producer and multi-instrumentalist most famous as the frontman and primary creative force behind the industrial rock band Nine Inch Nails. Reznor has also been associated with the bands Option 30, Exotic Birds, and Tapeworm, among others.

Though the majority of material released from Reznor has been under the Nine Inch Nails moniker, some material has been credited to Reznor himself, including writing, production, instrumental performances, and vocal contributions. Reznor has also remixed songs for a number of artists, including David Bowie, Queen, N*E*R*D, and Megadeth.

Reznor has released three singles with his band, How to Destroy Angels. This band features the vocals of Mariqueen Maandig, Reznor's wife and former West Indian Girl frontwoman. Their first album was released as a free download via the band's website on June 1, 2010; with the single "A Drowning". This was Reznor's first new material since his initial hiatus from Nine Inch Nails, which he later returned to.

== Soundtrack work ==
=== Films ===
All music composed together with Atticus Ross, unless otherwise noted.

Year	Name	Notes
1994	Natural Born Killers	Three songs: "Burn", "Something I Can Never Have" (Edited And Extended), and "A Warm Place" (Edit) - prior to Ross's involvement.
1997	Lost Highway	Solo work, two compositions: "Videodrones; Questions" and "Driver Down", Nine Inch Nails, one song: "The Perfect Drug" - prior to Ross's involvement.
2010	The Social Network	
2011	The Girl with the Dragon Tattoo	
2013	Sound City: Real to Reel	One song: "Mantra", with Dave Grohl and Josh Homme
2014	Gone Girl	
2016	Visions of Harmony (short film)	One composition: "Juno"; released as a single
2016	Before the Flood	Composed with Ross, Gustavo Santaolalla and Mogwai
2016	Patriots Day	
2017	The Black Ghiandola (short film)	Unreleased soundtrack
2018	Mid90s	
2018	Bird Box	
2019	Waves	
2020	Mank	
2020	Soul	Composed with Ross and Jon Batiste. Trent Reznor and Atticus Ross's first score for an animated film
2021	22 vs. Earth	Short film
2022	Bones and All	
2022	Empire of Light	
2023	Teenage Mutant Ninja Turtles: Mutant Mayhem	
2023	The Killer	
2024	Challengers	Co-producer and co-performer for 15 songs on the soundtrack as well; co-composer for 14 songs; co-wrote "Compress / Repress" song
2024	Queer	
2025	The Gorge	
2025	Tron: Ares	Credited as Nine Inch Nails; also executive producer
2025	After the Hunt	
2026	The Further Mis-Adventures of Cliff Booth	
2027	Slayground	Post-production

=== Television ===
All music composed together with Atticus Ross.

Year	Name	Notes
2017	The Vietnam War	
2018	The Fourth Estate	Main title only; soundtrack remains unreleased (score by H. Scott Salinas)
2019	Watchmen	Released in three volumes
2024	The Franchise	Main theme only

=== Video games ===
Year	Name	Notes
1996	Quake	Soundtrack and sound effects; credited with Nine Inch Nails
2012	Call of Duty: Black Ops II	Main title only (score by Jack Wall)
2015	Batman: Arkham Knight	Music consultant
TBA	Intergalactic: The Heretic Prophet	With Atticus Ross

=== Other ===
Year	Name	Notes
2017	Banksy’s Walled Off Hotel	"Green Lines"; with Atticus Ross

== Production and writing credits ==
Year	Artist	Album	Song(s)	Notes
1989	Troop	Attitude	—	Engineer
1994	Marilyn Manson	Get Your Gunn	"Get Your Gunn" "Misery Machine"	Co-producer
1994	Marilyn Manson	Portrait of an American Family	—	Co-producer, executive producer
1994	Various Artists	Natural Born Killers	—	Producer, Compiler
1995	Marilyn Manson	Lunchbox	"Lunchbox" "Down in the Park"	Co-producer
1995	Prick	Prick	"Communiqué" "Tough" "Other People" "No Fair Fights"	Engineer
1995	Marilyn Manson	Smells Like Children	—	Producer
1996	Marilyn Manson	Antichrist Superstar	All songs except "Dried Up, Tied and Dead to the World" and "Kinderfeld".	Producer
1997	Various Artists	Lost Highway	—	Producer
1998	2wo	Voyeurs	—	Executive producer
2004	A Perfect Circle	eMOTIVe	"Passive"	Writer (as part of Tapeworm)
2004	Jakalope	It Dreams	—	Additional production
2004	Zack de la Rocha	Songs and Artists that Inspired Fahrenheit 9/11	"We Want It All"	Producer
2006	Jakalope	Born 4	—	Associate producer
2007	El-P	I'll Sleep When You're Dead	"Flyentology"	Additional production
2007	Saul Williams	The Inevitable Rise and Liberation of NiggyTardust!	—	Producer
2007	Saul Williams	The Inevitable Rise and Liberation of NiggyTardust!	All songs except: "Tr(n)igger" "Sunday Bloody Sunday" "Scared Money"	Writer
2009	Jane's Addiction	NINJA 2009 Tour Sampler	"Chip Away" "Whores"	Producer
2009	Puscifer	"C" Is for (Please Insert Sophomoric Genitalia Reference Here)	"Potions (Deliverance Mix)"	Writer (as part of Tapeworm)
2017	Todd Rundgren	White Knight	"Deaf Ears"	Featured (with Atticus Ross)
2018	Lil Nas X	7	"Old Town Road"	Producer, writer (with YoungKio and Atticus Ross)
2019	Ashley O	–	"On a Roll" "Right Where I Belong"	Writer (with Charlie Brooker)
2021	Halsey	If I Can't Have Love, I Want Power	—	Producer (with Atticus Ross)
2023	WitchGang	—	"Nothing's Alright" "Timeless"	Producer, writer (with Atticus Ross, David Sitek and Hudson Mohawke)
2023	WitchGang	—	"Runaway"	Producer, writer (with Atticus Ross, David Sitek and Hudson Mohawke)
2024	WitchGang	—	"Runaway"	Producer, writer (with Atticus Ross, David Sitek and Hudson Mohawke)

== Remixes ==
Year	Artist	Album	Song(s)
1992	Machines of Loving Grace	Burn Like Brilliant Trash	"Burn Like Brilliant Trash (Radio Edit)", "Burnt Offering", "Burn Like Brilliant Trash (Dub 120 BPM)"
1992	Megadeth	Countdown to Extinction	"Symphony of Destruction (The Gristle Mix)" (with Chris Vrenna and Sean Beavan)
1992	Queen	Stone Cold Crazy (promo), Freakshow compilation	"Stone Cold Crazy (Re-Produced by Trent Reznor)"
1992	Queen	The Unauthorized Club Record (promo)	"Tie Your Mother Down (Trent Reznor Remix)"
1993	Curve	Blackerthreetrackertwo	"Missing Link (Screaming Bird Mix)" (with Flood)
1993	Butthole Surfers	The Wooden Song	"Who Was in My Room Last Night (Trent Reznor Remix)"
1994	Marilyn Manson	Get Your Gunn	"Mother Inferior Got Her Gunn"
1995	David Bowie	The Hearts Filthy Lesson	"The Hearts Filthy Lesson (Alt. Mix)" (with Chris Vrenna and Dave Ogilvie)
1998	12 Rounds	Pleasant Smell	"Pleasant Smell (Rethought)" – 2 versions (with Keith Hillebrandt and Clint Mansell)
2001	N*E*R*D	Spin This (compilation)	"Lapdance (Trent Reznor Remix)"
2003	Peter Gabriel	Growing Up	"Growing Up (Trent Reznor Remix)"
2005	U2	Vertigo (promo), Sometimes You Can't Make It on Your Own, Artificial Horizon	"Vertigo (Trent Reznor Remix)"
2012	Telepathe	Destroyer	"Destroyer (Remix)" (with Alessandro Cortini and Atticus Ross)
2017	John Carpenter	John Carpenter's Halloween	"John Carpenter's Halloween (Trent Reznor & Atticus Ross Version)" (with Atticus Ross)

== Vocal contributions ==
Year	Artist	Album	Song(s)	Notes
1988	Lucky Pierre	Communiqué	"Communiqué", "I Need to Get to Know (Other People)"	Backing vocals
1990	1000 Homo DJs	Wax Trax! Sampler #2	"Supernaut"	Reznor's vocals are uncredited on this sampler. Later released in 1994 as "Supernaut (Trent Reznor Vocal Version)"
1991	Pigface	Gub	"Suck"	Later rerecorded by Nine Inch Nails on Broken.
1994	Tori Amos	Under the Pink	"Past the Mission"	Backing vocals
1998	Josh Wink	Herehear	"Black Bomb (Jerry in the Bag)"	
2007	El-P	I'll Sleep When You're Dead	"Flyentology"	Additional vocals
2007	Queens of the Stone Age	Era Vulgaris (UK, JP, AUS versions) and "You Know What You Did"	"Era Vulgaris"	Additional vocals
2007	Saul Williams	The Inevitable Rise and Liberation of NiggyTardust!	"Break", "WTF!"	Backing vocals on "WTF!"
2013	Queens of the Stone Age	...Like Clockwork	"Kalopsia", "Fairweather Friends"	Vocals
2020	Tobacco	Hot Wet & Sassy	"Babysitter (feat. Trent Reznor)"	
2021	Danny Elfman	Bigger. Messsier	"True", "Native Intelligence"	Vocals
2022	Antonio Sánchez	SHIFT (Bad Hombre Vol. II)	"I Think We're Past That Now"	Vocals
2025	Peter Murphy	Silver Shade	"Swoon"	Vocals

== Instrumental contributions ==
Year	Instrument	Artist	Album	Song(s)
1988	Saxophone	Lucky Pierre	Communiqué	"I Need to Get to Know (Other People)"
1994	Guitar	Marilyn Manson	Portrait of an American Family	"Lunchbox"
1996	Guitar	Marilyn Manson	Antichrist Superstar	"Little Horn", "Mister Superstar", "Deformography"
1991	Loops	Pigface	Gub	"The Bushmaster"
1991	Programming	Crunch-Ø-Matic	Cautiøn Dø Nøt Play	—
1994	Mixing	Marilyn Manson	Portrait of an American Family	—
1994	Saxophone	Marilyn Manson	Portrait of an American Family	"My Monkey"
1996	Mellotron	Marilyn Manson	Antichrist Superstar	"Cryptorchid"
1996	Rhodes piano	Marilyn Manson	Antichrist Superstar	"Man That You Fear"
1996	Programming	Marilyn Manson	Antichrist Superstar	—
2007	Programming	Saul Williams	The Inevitable Rise and Liberation of NiggyTardust!	—
2011	Programming	Robbie Robertson	How To Become Clairvoyant	"Madame X"

== See also ==
- Nine Inch Nails discography
- How to Destroy Angels discography
- List of songs recorded by Nine Inch Nails
