= Dorcy Rugamba =

Rwandan author, stage director, actor and dancer (born 1969)

- In a 2026 interview
- Born: Rugamba; September 1969 (age 57); Kigali
- Citizenship: Rwanda
- Education: National University of Rwanda; Catholic University of Louvain
- Occupation: Actor
- Known for: artistic director
- Children: 3

Dorcy Rugamba (born 1969) is a Rwandan author, actor, dancer, and stage director. Being a survivor of the 1994 Rwandan genocide, in which his parents and most of his family were murdered, much of his work is focused on this and other genocides. He has also acted in films. He founded the Rwanda Arts Initiative and the Kigali Triennial. His 2024 memoir dedicated to his absent family, Hewa Rwanda, une lettre aux absents, is being presented in English translation as a performance accompanied by music, called Hewa Rwanda, Letter to the Absent, premiering in February 2025 at the Adelaide Festival in Australia.

== Early life and education ==
Dorcy Rugamba was born in Rwanda in 1969, the son of Cyprien and Daphrose Rugamba. Cyprien Rugamba (a Hutu man) was a writer, choreographer, composer, and museum curator, and Daphrose was a Tutsi woman. The couple introduced the Catholic Charismatic Renewal and the Emmanuel Community to Rwanda in 1990.

Dorcy was introduced to the performing arts by his father. He trained in the Rwandan traditional dance, Intore.

He first studied pharmacy at the National University of Rwanda. (Note: Source says that he also studied at the Catholic University of Louvain; however, this institution ceased to exist in 1969, so it may have been Université libre de Bruxelles?) While Rugamba, aged around 25 at that time, was visiting an aunt in southern Rwanda, at 10am on 7 April 1994 his family home in Kigali was stormed by Hutu militia. This was a day after the assassination of the president, which marked the start of the Rwandan genocide. Soldiers rounded up everyone in the home at the time: the six children of Cyprien and Daphrose, including two girls aged nine and seven, and their six-year-old cousin, along with a family employee and his parent. They were all killed by machine guns, apart from one of Rugamba's teenage brothers, who had been covered up by the others' bleeding bodies. After the soldiers had left, the boy made his way to the phone and called Rugamba. After being told what had happened, he fled the country, first to Burundi and eventually to Paris, and then later to Belgium. Over 100 days, up to a million people were massacred.

Dropping out of his pharmacy degree (which he was not enjoying anyway), Rugamba turned to the performing arts to help him heal and understand what had happened. He studied at the Conservatoire royal de Liège in Belgium, where he won the first prize in dramatic art.

== Career ==
In 1992, Rugamba founded his first theatre and dance company, Isango, in Butare, in the southern province of Rwanda.

He co-authored the collective work Rwanda 94, which was produced in 1998 a collective of artists from different disciplines and different nationalities based in Belgium called Groupov. Rugamba was one of the scriptwriters and also acted in the six-hour performance. Rwanda 94 premiered in 1999 at the Festival d'Avignon in France, toured extensively internationally, and won several awards in Belgium and France. In 2004, to mark 10 years after the Rwandan genocide, the work was presented in Butare, Kigali, and Bisesero, in Rwanda.

In 2001, he founded the "Urwintore" Workshops in Kigali, for performing arts education, creation, and research.

In 2005, he co-directed and performed in L'Instruction, a play by Peter Weiss based on the trial of the Auschwitz perpetrators. This work was performed in Rwanda, France, Belgium, England, Japan, and the United States.

Rugamba worked with Peter Brook's company, and with Rosa Gasquet and Swiss director Milo Rau, between 2004 and 2008. He has also worked with the Belgian National Theatre.

In 2007 he wrote and produced Investigation, based on The Holocaust, describing how a country deals with trauma. Featuring only Rwandan actors, the play was staged internationally, including Brussels, Paris, New York, Chicago, and Yokohama.

Rugamba wrote the play Bloody Niggers!, which was performed in 2007 at the Théâtre national Wallonie-Bruxelles and reprised in 2016 in Hamburg, Germany. He also wrote Retour de Kigali.

In 2010, he staged Return to Paradise at a farm in Yvelines, France. A briefer version, called Market Place, was presented in the same year. He directed a new work, Gamblers: or the Last War of the Hungry Soldier, which premiered in April 2011 at the Zuiderspershuis in Antwerp, Belgium.

The Rwanda Arts Initiative, founded by Rugamba in 2012, has developed several of his projects.

In 2018, he developed, along with Hamburg artists Yolander Gutiérrez and Jens Dietrich, an interdisciplinary show called Planet Kigali, described as "a fusion of Rwandan tradition and contemporary dance". The show premiered on 12 December 2018 at Kampnagel in Hamburg, Germany.

In 2019 he created the opera Umurinzi ("the guardian"), to commemorate 25 years of the Tutsi genocide, and inspired by Rwandan tradition called "Guterekera". Umurunzi was performed at the Kigali Convention Centre. The script is based on testimonies of Genocide survivors. The play was produced in four languages: Kinyarwanda (the official language of Rwanda), English, French, and Kiswahili, an East African language. The opera was also shown on Rwanda Television, and part of it is available on YouTube.

By 2019 he had produced seven plays about genocide. In March 2020, he created Les restes suprêmes, focused on the African heritage of European museums, which he produced and performed at the Dakar Biennale in 2022.

In October 2020, at the Théâtre du Châtelet in Paris, he began a collaboration with Mauritanian film director Abderrahmane Sissako to stage the opera Le vol du Boli, with music by English musician Damon Albarn.

=== Hewa Rwanda ===
In March 2024, his memoir dedicated to his absent family and as a gift to his children, Hewa Rwanda, une lettre aux absents, was published by Éditions JC Lattès. It was widely praised, and nominated for the Prix Renaudot. The book was published in English as Hewa Rwanda, Letter to the Absent. In June 2024 he presented a performance of the same name at the Großes Haus theatre in Braunschweig, Germany, as part of the Festival Theaterformen, and in October at the Théâtre des Bouffes du Nord as part of the Festival d'automne à Paris. together with Senegalese multi-instrumentalist Majnun, whose name means "madman" in Arabic. A work-in-progress reading of the translated text was presented in Portland, Maine, US, on 18 January 2025, ahead of being presented at the Adelaide Festival in Adelaide, Australia, in March 2025. In this work, he uses art as a form of healing. He has written about this work: "While Hewa Rwanda, Letter to the Absent addresses the genocide, questions of mourning, and a family that was nearly annihilated, I primarily wanted it not to be a commemorative text but a hymn to life, so the tone of the text deliberately embraces lightness, humour, poetry, music, and life in all its aspects". The work is a Rwanda Arts Initiative production. The performance is also being staged three times as part of WOMADelaide, and outdoor festival of music and dance which is part of the Adelaide Festival. In the presentation, he talks about what he learnt from his parents and what he saw, and how long it took him "to accept the unacceptable". By presenting such works, he remains close to those who are absent, honouring their lives and finding beauty and poetry in the world.

=== Film ===
Rugamba has also appeared on screen, both as himself and as an actor.

He is a narrator in the 2016 feature documentary about his parents, J'entrerai au ciel en dansant (I'll Enter Heaven Dancing).

He plays the character of Innocent in the 2021 Afrofuturist film Neptune Frost, co-directed by Rwandan playwright and actress Anisia Uzeyman and American musician and multimedia artist Saul Williams (who wrote the screenplay).

== Other activities ==
In 2012, Rugamba founded the Rwanda Arts Initiative.

In May 2022, he appeared at the Africities summit in Kisumu, Kenya, a pan-African event held every three years in one of the five African regions.

In February 2024 he founded and became artistic director of the Kigali Triennial, Kigali's inaugural arts market. Marembo tells of the last days of his family in Rwanda in poetic form, and was performed at the Kigali Triennial.

Rugamba spoke at the ISPA (International Society for the Performing Arts) 2025 New York Congress.

== Personal life ==
As of 2024 Rugamba lives in Brussels and Rwanda. He returns to his family home in Kigali each year.

He speaks French fluently as "like his mother tongue", and writes in French. He is married and has two sons and a daughter, who were born in Belgium and go to a "normal" school there. His surviving siblings and their children still live in Rwanda, where it is "impossible to keep them away from our story", whereas his own children are able to enjoy a childhood of relative innocence.
