= Rugambwa =

Rugambwa is a surname. Some notable people with this surname are:

- Laurean Rugambwa (1912–1997), Tanzanian Catholic cardinal
- Novatus Rugambwa (1957–2025), Tanzanian Catholic archbishop and diplomat
- Protase Rugambwa (born 1960), Tanzanian Catholic cardinal

== See also ==
- Cyprien and Daphrose Rugamba, victims of the 1994 Rwandan Genocide
- Dorcy Rugamba (born 1969), son of Cyprien and Daphrose, author, musician, actor, and dancer
