= Marcia Jones =

Marcia Jones may refer to:

- Marcia Jones (writer) (born 1958), American writer of children's books
- Marcia Jones (artist) (born 1972), professor and artist
- Marcia Mae Jones (1924–2007), American actress
- Marcia Jones-Smoke (born 1941), American sprint canoer
