= Mats Staub =

Swiss artist (b. 1972)

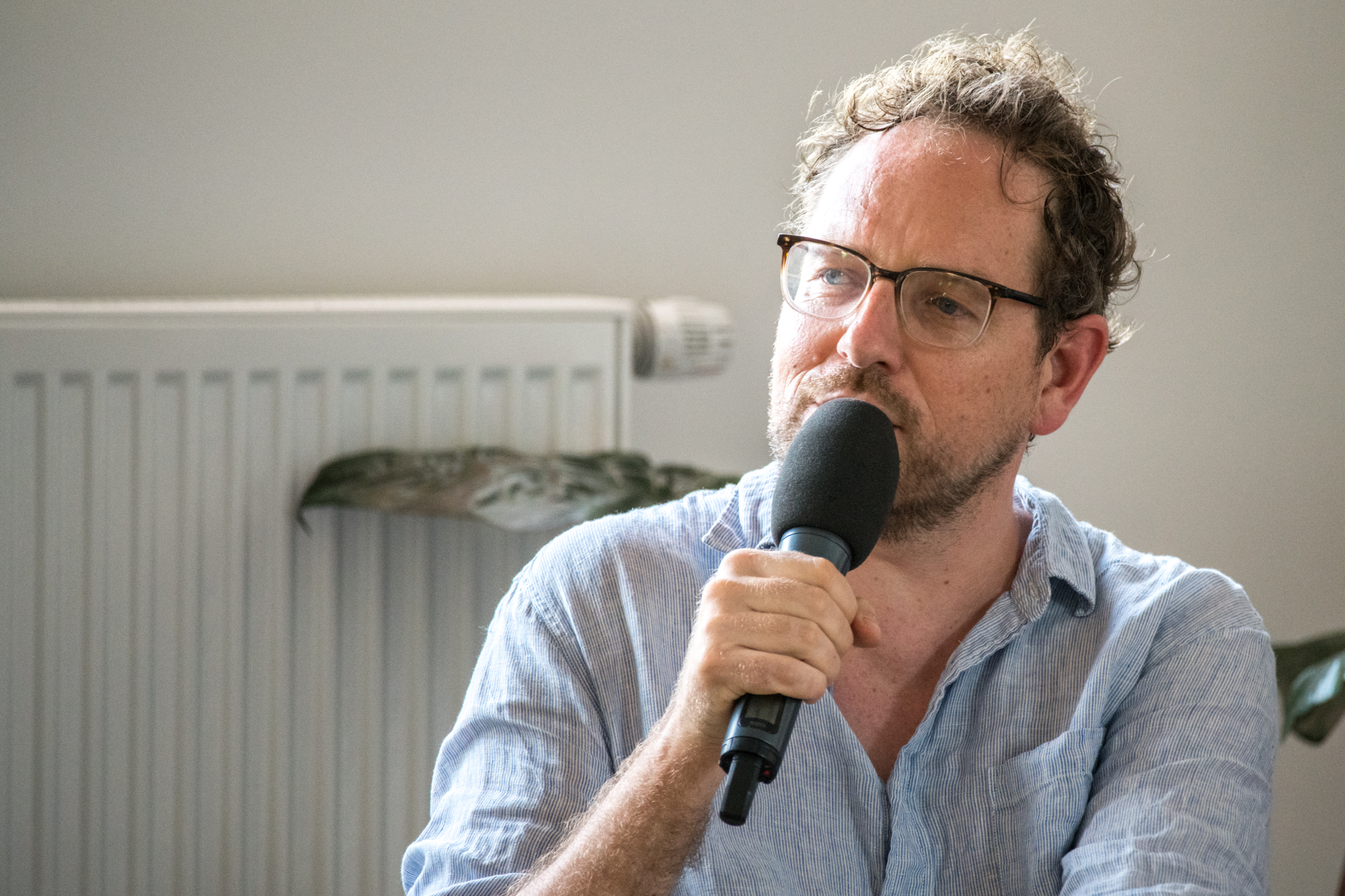

Mats Staub (born 1972, Muri near Berne, Switzerland) is a Swiss artist. He mainly lives and works in Berlin. His projects have been presented worldwide, including at Künstlerhaus Mousonturm Frankfurt, Kaserne Basel, Theaterhaus Gessnerallee Zurich, Théâtre de Vidy Lausanne, the Berne Museum of Communication, the Theaterformen Festival in Hannover/Braunschweig, the Wiener Festwochen, the Adelaide Festival, the Bienal de Arte Mediales in Santiago de Chile, and the South African International Documentary Festival Encounters in Cape Town.

== Biography ==
Mats Staub studied theatre, journalism and religious studies in Berne, Fribourg and Berlin. He worked as a dramaturg at Theater Neumarkt in Zurich (2002–2004), before beginning to create his own artistic projects.

Staub's work is concerned with memory, life stories and far-reaching biographical experiences. His projects have led Staub to make interviews and recordings all around the world. For his audio installation My Grandparents (2008-2013), he talked to over three hundred people in fourteen cities about what they remember about their grandparents. In the video installation 21 – Memories of Growing Up he has portrayed members of different generations in the process of remembering the time when they were 21 years old. His online collection Ten Important Events In My Life, comprising around 3000 events, was also published as a book (Salis Verlag, 2014) and was continued as a site-specific as well as museum exhibition in Spain and Latin America as Diez moments en mi vida (2017-2019). Every project constitutes a growing archive of conversations and oral history from different countries, in different languages, often spanning several generations.

Staub has worked with different formats: besides his audio and video installations with online collections (Ten Important Events In My Life), books, site-specific audio walks (Bundesplatz and Metzgergasse) as well as exhibitions in museums and in public space (Diez momentos en mi vida).

His projects have been invited to festivals such as the Wiener Festwochen (2006, 2009, 2015), the Adelaide Festival (2018) and the Edinburgh Festival Fringe (2019).

== Works ==
- Death and Birth in My Life, long-term project since 2019
- 21- Memories of Growing Up, long-term project since 2012
- Artist (working title), 2018
- Diez momentos en mi vida, 2017-2019
- When Did You Stop Being a Child?, 2016
- My Other Life, long-term project since 2015
- Werdegänge (Winterthur), 2013-2017
- Ten Important Events In My Life, 2012-2015
- The Names of Love, 2012
- Bundesplatz, 2012
- Metzgergasse, 2011-2013
- Holidays, 2010-2012
- My Grandparents, 2008-2013
- 5000 Love Letters, 2004-2006

== Publications ==
- Meine Grosseltern. My Grandparents, Edition Patrick Frey, 2010 Hardcover, 192 Seiten, 115 S/W-Abbildungen, 15.7 × 22 cm ISBN Nummer: 978-3-905509-94-6
- Zehn wichtigste Ereignisse meines Lebens, Salis Verlag, 2014 Broschur, 396 Seiten, 11.5 x 17 cm
- "Leben – Erzählen – Zeigen. Gedanken zum Umgang mit dem Biographischen im künstlerischen Werk von Mats Staub." In: Krankenhagen, S. & Vahrson, V. (Hg.) Geschichte kuratieren. Kultur- und kunstwissenschaftliche An-Ordnungen der Vergangenheit. Köln, Weimar, Wien: Böhlau Verlag, 2017
