= Neptune Frost =

2021 American-Rwandan film

- Theatrical release poster
- Directed by: Saul Williams; Anisia Uzeyman
- Written by: Saul Williams
- Produced by: Ezra Miller; Stephen Hendel; Saul Williams
- Starring: Elvis Ngabo; Cheryl Isheja; Kaya Free
- Cinematography: Anisia Uzeyman
- Edited by: Anisha Acharya
- Music by: Saul Williams
- Production companies: Swan Films; Sopherim; Knitting Factory Entertainment; SPKN/WRD; Quiet; Carte Blanche; Redwire Pictures
- Distributed by: Kino Lorber
- Release dates: July 8, 2021 (Cannes); June 3, 2022 (United States)
- Running time: 110 minutes
- Countries: Rwanda; United States
- Languages: Kinyarwanda; Kirundi; Swahili; French; English
- Box office: $203,393

Neptune Frost is a 2021 science fiction romantic musical co-directed by Saul Williams and Anisia Uzeyman and starring Cheryl Isheja, Elvis Ngabo and Kaya Free. Set in a post-civil war Burundi spanning past, future, and present times, the film follows the relationship between an intersex hacker and a coltan miner. Ezra Miller is a producer and Lin-Manuel Miranda an executive producer. It had its world premiere at the 2021 Cannes Film Festival in the Directors Fortnight section on July 8, 2021, and was released in the United States on June 3, 2022, by Kino Lorber to critical acclaim.

== Plot ==
The film is an Afrofuturist story set in a village in Burundi made of computer parts, and centers on the relationship between Neptune, an intersex runaway, and Matalusa, a coltan miner, whose love leads a hacker collective.

The film begins with images of mining and sounds of communal song. In the mines are Matalusa and his brother Tekno. Tekno dies when, after he briefly pauses in his work in awe of the power of the coltan he mines, a guard demands he get back to work and clubs him with his rifle. The death of Tekno prompts Matalusa's hero's journey. Neptune's story also begins with death, as they attend a funeral for their aunt in which they also sing together to express their grief. The subconscious connection between Matalusa and Neptune, manifesting as visions sent by their future child, draw them together, each embarking on their on-the-road journeys across the country to find the "Unanimous Goldmine" community. "Unanimous Goldmine" is a code of unity that identifies characters' kinship to the group of young adults that encompass it in another realm layered upon reality. The two become the leaders of this community, bonded by powerful rhetoric through speech and song as well as a mission to subvert the big tech powers that control the internet.

Neptune's technokinetic abilities allow them to spread their ideas, creed and philosophy across the world through a series of hacks. Unable to trace its origin, Neptune's virus is blamed on Russia and China by world powers until Memory's brother, Innocent, posing in the disguise of the autocratic state's police officers, stumbles upon the hidden Unanimous Goldmine and briefly reunites with his sister. Memory compassionately scolds him for an earlier encounter with Neptune where discovering their gender caused him to react violently. She asks him to leave them in peace and discourages him from speaking with Neptune. But it is too late, as he has been followed by a drone which subsequently outs them to the world. The community is quickly destroyed by an explosion, though Neptune survives, having been away at the time of execution. The lone survivor of the attack, they project and reveal their existence to the world before the film ends.

== Cast ==
- Cheryl Isheja as Neptune
- Elvis Ngabo as Neptune
- Bertrand "Kaya Free" Ninteretse as Matalusa
- Eliane Umuhire as Memory
- Dorcy Rugamba as Innocent
- Rebecca Uwamahoro as Elohel
- Trésor Niyongabo as Psychology
- Eric Ngangare "1Key" as Potolo
- Natacha Muziramakenga as Binya
- Cécile Kayirebwa as Nun
- Diogene "Atome" Ntarindwa as Priest

== Production ==
The project was originally conceived by Saul Williams as a graphic novel in 2013, and later a stage musical. Williams' 2016 album MartyrLoserKing explored further ideas that were incorporated into the film.

In 2018, Williams launched a Kickstarter campaign to raise funds, with Lin-Manuel Miranda joining as an executive producer.

In February 2020, it was announced that Ezra Miller and Stephen Hendel were set to produce, with principal photography commencing. Production took place over the course of 27 days in Rwanda.

Neptune Frost is the debut feature film by directors Saul Williams and Rwandan-born artist and cinematographer Anisia Uzeyman, described as "a bombastic Afrofuturist sci-fi punk musical" on Rogerebert.com.

"Neptune Frost" is the name of a black Revolutionary soldier who served in the Continental Army in 1775.

== Release ==
Neptune Frost had its world premiere on July 8, 2021. at the Directors' Fortnight section at the 2021 Cannes Film Festival, where it was a nominee for the Queer Palm. It had its North American premiere in the Wavelengths program at the 2021 Toronto International Film Festival on September 10, 2021. It also screened at the New York Film Festival on October 2, 2021. and the 2022 Sundance Film Festival on January 21, 2022.

It had its Australian premiere at the Melbourne International Film Festival in August 2022, where it won the inaugural Bright Horizons award, the richest film prize in the southern hemisphere, at A$140,000 in cash.

In December 2021, Kino Lorber acquired distribution rights. It was released in the United States on a limited release on June 3, 2022.

== Reception ==
On the review aggregator website Rotten Tomatoes, 96% of 77 critics' reviews are positive, with an average rating of 7.80/10. The site's critical consensus reads "Bursting with ideas and ambition, Neptune Frost is difficult to describe -- and just as hard to resist." On Metacritic, the film had a weighted average score of 83 out of 100, based on 20 critics, indicating "universal acclaim".

In November 2022, the film was nominated for an Independent Spirit Award for Best Cinematography.

== See also ==
- List of Afrofuturist films
