= Marcia Jones (artist) =

American artist

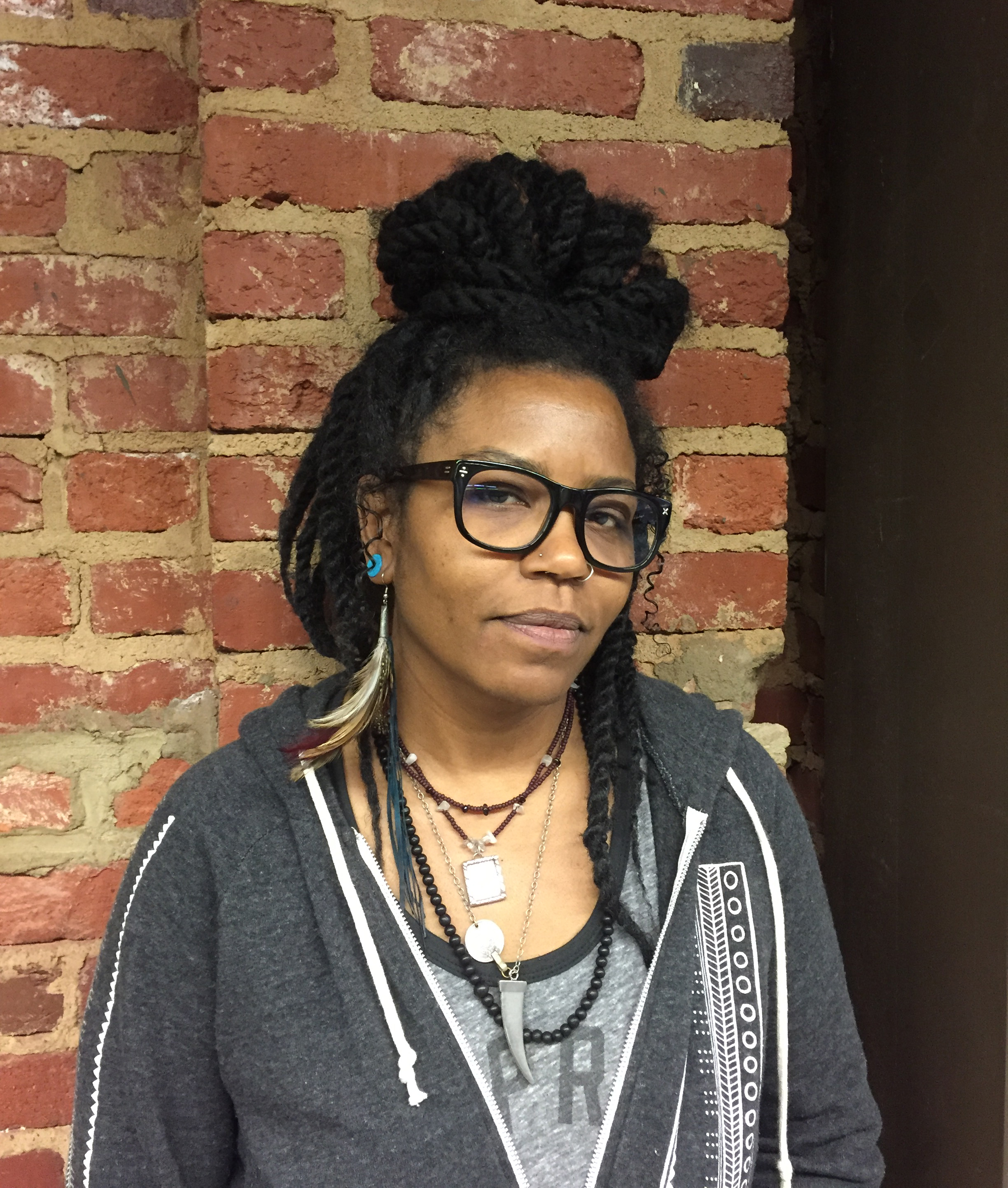
- Artist Marcia Jones
- Born: 1972 (age 53–54); Chicago, Illinois
- Education: University of North Carolina Greensboro and Clark Atlanta University
- Children: 1

Marcia Jones (born circa 1972 in Chicago Illinois) is an American professor and contemporary artist, known for her multimedia and large-scale installation works.

== Early life and education ==
Jones was born premature at Chicago's Little Company of Mary Hospital to Paul Davis and Christine Jones. After moving many times with her mother, she spent her high school years in Los Angeles, CA at Marshall High School. Jones majored in Fashion Design at Clark Atlanta University where she later taught and moved to New York in 1995 after being inspired by artists like Radcliffe Bailey to pursue fine art. She studied under Juan Logan, Kojo Griffin, Susan Page and Cora Cohen at UNC Greensboro to earn her MFA in visual arts in 2004.

== Career ==
Jones moved to New York in 1995 to pursue fashion design and worked for Harriette Cole before finding her calling as a fine artist. She was a kinetic (performance) painter, painting to live music on stage, with the Brooklyn Bohemian scene at venues such as the Brooklyn Moon Cafe that incubated the beginnings of careers such as Mos Def, Common, Saul Williams, Erykah Badu, Kevin Powell, and Sarah Jones. Her work appears as the cover art for Saul Williams' book, The Seventh Octave and his album, Amethyst Rock Star, and she collaborated with him on his book, S/HE.

Jones's work was featured on numerous book covers and has exhibited at the New Museum of Contemporary Art, Museum of Contemporary Art, Chicago, Southeastern Center for Contemporary Art, Weatherspoon Art Museum, and Spelman College Museum of Fine Art.

She was a professor of art at Clark Atlanta University from 2004-2009.

Jones's work explores personal identity, sexuality, history and the female paradigm. Her exhibition at the Harvey B. Gantt Center explored the dichotomy of the virgin and the whore through an analogy with Haitian Voodoo motifs and Magic City strip club culture.

Jones was a 2011 Artist-in-Residence at the McColl Center for Art + Innovation in Charlotte, North Carolina. Also in 2011 Jones was chosen to discuss creativity on a panel for Rocco Landesman, chairman of the National Endowment for the Arts. She was featured in the Afropunk Showcase at Moogfest in 2014. In 2005 she received a Caversham Printmaking Fellowship and attended the Spelman College Taller Portobello Artist Colony in 2006.

In 2018 Jones's work was included in the exhibition Black Blooded at the New Gallery of Modern Art in Charlotte, North Carolina. A performance of hers was featured as part of the opening reception, in which she wore raven feathers and a white dress while creating a live kinetic drawing in charcoal. The ephemera from the work was displayed in the gallery following the exhibition. Also included in this exhibit were works by Mickalene Thomas, Theaster Gates, Rashayla Marie Brown and Kerry James Marshall.

Also in 2018 Jones included work in The Black Woman is God: Assembly of Gods an annual exhibition of work by Black women artists at SOMArts Gallery in San Francisco.

== Personal life ==
Jones met poet Saul Williams after moving to New York and in 1996 birthed their daughter, Saturn River Renge, after sixty-hour labor. In 2004, three days after earning her MFA, Jones was hospitalized and diagnosed with multiple sclerosis.
