= Cyprien and Daphrose Rugamba =

Rwandan Christians killed in 1994 genocide

Servants of God Cyprien and Daphrose Rugamba
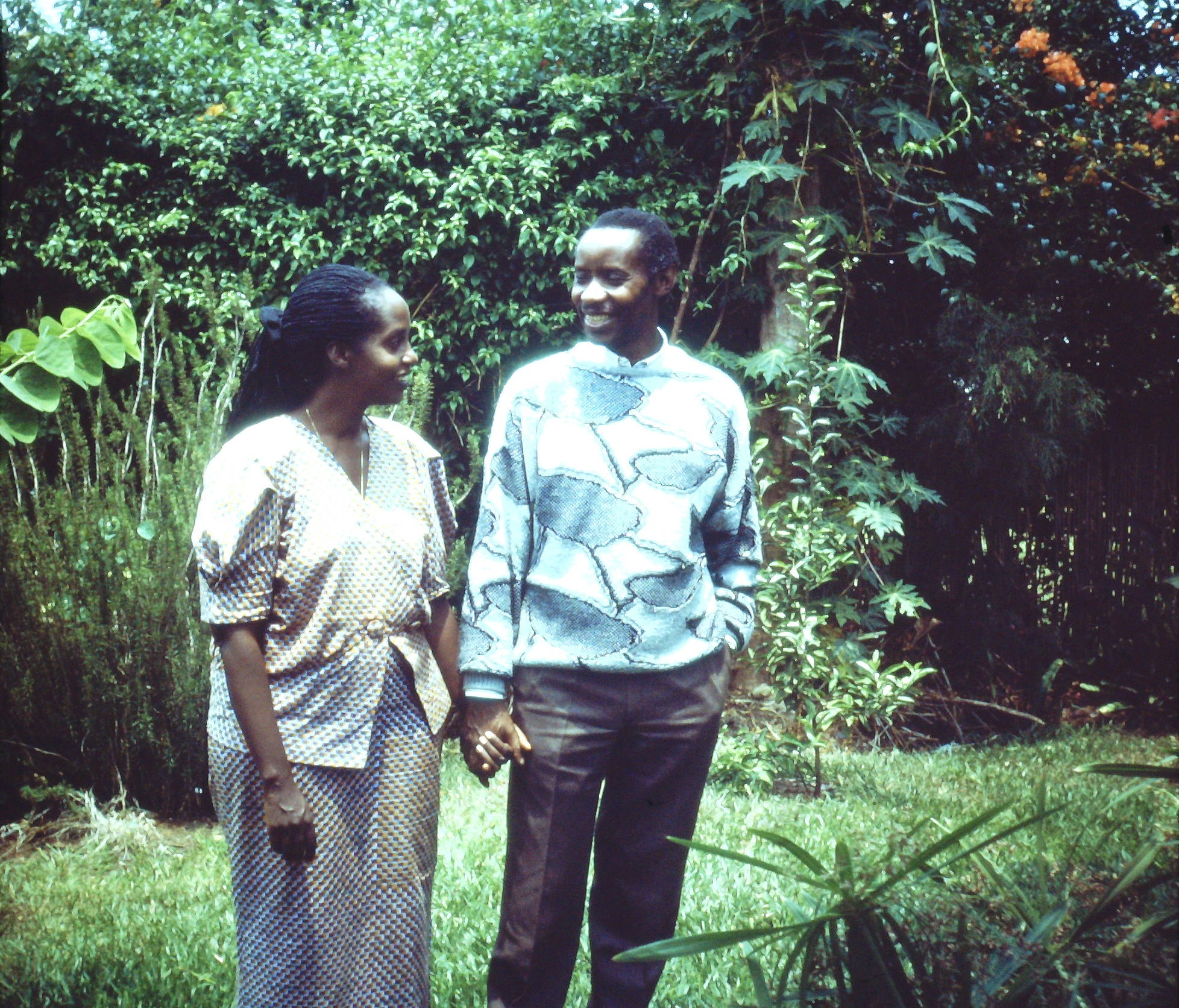
- Photograph taken in 1992 in the garden of their home in Kigali (Rwanda).
- Born: Cyprien Rugamba ca. 1935; Daphrose Mukansanga ca. 1944; Cyanika, Nyamagabe, Rwanda
- Died: 7 April 1994; Kigali, Rwanda

Cyprien (c. 1935 – 7 April 1994) and Daphrose Rugamba (c. 1944 – 7 April 1994) were a married couple from Rwanda, who introduced the Catholic Charismatic Renewal and the Emmanuel Community to their country in 1990. Cyprien was a writer, choreographer, composer, and museum curator, and Daphrose was a school teacher. They were both murdered in the Rwandan genocide of 1994. The cause for their canonization in the Catholic Church was opened in 2015.

== Biography ==
Cyprien [Sipiriyani] Rugamba was born around 1935. He attended primary school in Nyamagabe. In September 1948, he was admitted to Saint Léon Minor Seminary of Kabgayi, where he finished in 1954 and moved to Nyakibanda Major Seminary. He also studied history in Burundi and Belgium. He had a talent for poetry, music, and choreography, with a particular interest for ancestral art forms in Rwanda. He served as director of the Rwandan National Institute for Scientific Studies in Butare.

Daphrose [Daforoza] Mukasanga was a school teacher, born around 1944 in the same village of Cyanika in the south of Rwanda as Cyprien. They married in 1965, but the relationship was not easy; Cyprien neglected Daphrose and was unfaithful to her, leading to a separation. In 1982 Cyprien, who had lost his Catholic faith, had a religious experience which restored their marriage. They moved to Kigali, where they established a feeding center for street children.

They encountered the Emmanuel Community in 1989 through Fidesco and went on a pilgrimage to Paray-le-Monial. When they returned to Rwanda, they started a weekly sharing group. The first Community Weekend took place on 22–23 September 1990, thereby establishing the Emmanuel Community in that nation.

Cyprien was considered by many to be a Rwandan who created art for all people due to the general impression that his works, which included actors from all ethnic groups, embodied a concentrated focus on writing about Rwandan history and culture, regardless of ethnicity.

The independence of the Republic of Rwanda led to ethnic tensions between the Hutu and Tutsi peoples. Cyprien and Daphrose advocated peace. Cyprien declined to be a member of a political party, claiming that "the party of Jesus" was his only one. Cyprien advised President Juvénal Habyarimana to stop the registration of ethnicity on identity cards. He was warned that this stance would place him on a hit list.

Sensing their imminent death, the couple spent the night of 6 April 1994 in Eucharistic adoration. At 10am on 7 April 1994 their home in Kigali was stormed by Hutu militia, a day after the assassination of the president, which marked the start of the Rwandan genocide. Soldiers rounded up everyone in the home at the time: the six children of Cyprien and Daphrose, including two girls aged nine and seven, and their six-year-old cousin, along with a family employee and his parent. The soldiers asked Cyprien if he was a Christian, to which he answered with the verse of one of his own songs: "J'entrerai au ciel en dansant!" ("Yes... and I will enter heaven dancing!"). They were all killed by machine guns, apart from one teenage boy who had been covered up by the others' bleeding bodies. After the soldiers had left, the boy made his way to the phone and called his brother Dorcy Rugamba, who was in southern Rwanda visiting an aunt. After being told what had happened, Dorcy fled the country and made his way to Paris, and then to Belgium. Over the following 100 days up to a million people were massacred in an episode of ethnic cleansing.

== Legacy ==
In 1992 the Rugambas started a center in Kigali to feed and educate street children. Since 1995, after the genocide, this center has been managed by Fidesco. It is now called Centre Cyprien et Daphrose Rugamba (CECYDAR). In 2015 Cyprien and Daphrose Rugamba were declared "heroic in virtue," marking the start of the formal process towards their canonization as saints recognised by the Catholic Church. The diocesan inquiry phase of their cause was completed in 2021.

The 2016 documentary film J'entrerai au ciel en dansant, directed by François Lespés, is about the lives of the couple and their family. It is narrated by one of the couple's surviving sons, Dorcy Rugamba.

Dorcy Rugamba is an author, actor, dancer, and stage director, who is now based in Belgium but spends a lot of time in Rwanda. He has written and produced many theatrical works about the genocide. In March 2024, his memoir dedicated to his absent family, Hewa Rwanda, une lettre aux absents, was published by Éditions JC Lattès. The book was published in English as Hewa Rwanda, Letter to the Absent, and a new performance of the work accompanied by music is being premiered in February 2025 as part of the Adelaide Festival in Australia.

Their other surviving children and their children live in Rwanda.
