= Volcanic Sunlight =

Studio album by Saul Williams
- Released: May 10, 2011
- Genre: Dance-pop
- Length: 55:16
- Label: Columbia Records
- Producer: Renaud Létang

Saul Williams chronology
The Inevitable Rise and Liberation of NiggyTardust! (2007)	Volcanic Sunlight (2011)	MartyrLoserKing (2016)

Volcanic Sunlight is the fourth solo studio album by Saul Williams. It was released by Columbia Records in 2011.

The album features a different approach than his previous albums, embracing a dance-pop direction, with various influences from funk, disco, '60s garage rock, new wave, and dubstep.

== Critical reception ==
Professional ratings
Aggregate scores
Source	Rating
Metacritic	73/100
Review scores
Source	Rating
AllMusic	4/5 stars
Okayplayer	85/100
PopMatters	6/10 stars

At Metacritic, which assigns a weighted average score out of 100 to reviews from mainstream critics, the album received an average score of 73% based on 6 reviews, indicating "generally favorable reviews".

Alexander Heigl of PopMatters gave the album 6 stars out of 10, calling it "a solid, finely-tuned album that reveals new turns and tricks with every listen." Dylan Grier of Okayplayer gave the album an 85 out of 100, writing: "this album is, in many ways, much simpler than many of his previous offerings, but may leave listeners more confounded than ever."

== Track listing ==
All tracks are written by Saul Williams, except "Girls Have More Fun" by Williams and CX KiDTRONiK.

No.	Title	Length
1.	"Look to the Sun"	4:08
2.	"Patience"	3:52
3.	"Explain My Heart"	4:15
4.	"Triumph"	6:03
5.	"Diagram"	3:47
6.	"Girls Have More Fun" (also known as "Girls on Saturn")	2:27
7.	"Give It Up"	4:12
8.	"Dance" (featuring Janelle Monáe)	3:35
9.	"Volcanic Sunlight"	3:56
10.	"Rocket"	3:52
11.	"Fall Up"	4:17
12.	"Innocence"	5:43
13.	"New Day"	5:14

== Personnel ==
Credits adapted from liner notes.

- Saul Williams – lead vocals, songwriting, arrangement, guitar (3), bass guitar (13), keyboards (2–5, 7–11, 13), percussion (3)
- Renaud Létang – production, arrangement, keyboards (1–8, 10–13), guitar (1–5, 7, 8, 10–13), bass guitar (1, 2, 4, 8, 10, 12), percussion (3, 6), tambourine (13), piano (13), mixing
- David Sztanke – keyboards (1, 5–11, 13)
- Vincent Taeger – drums (1, 2, 4–9, 12, 13), tambourine (13)
- Vincent Taeger – percussion (1, 12)
- Lippie – backing vocals (2)
- Julien Chirol – brass (2, 9, 10, 13), trombone (3), flute (3)
- Lionel Segui – brass (2, 9, 10, 13), trombone (3), tuba (3)
- Misha Cliquennois – brass (2, 9, 10, 13), trumpet (3), horn (3)
- Mamané Thiam – percussion (3, 4)
- Denis Teste – keyboards (4)
- Saturn – backing vocals (6, 8)
- Deep Cotton – backing vocals (12)
- Janelle Monáe – backing vocals (12)
- Thomas Moulin – recording
- Howie Weinberg – mastering
