= Quake (soundtrack) =

1996 soundtrack

Soundtrack album by Nine Inch Nails
- Released: June 22, 1996
- Genre: Dark ambient
- Length: 58:53
- Labels: Interscope; id Software
- Producer: Trent Reznor

Nine Inch Nails chronology
Further Down the Spiral (1995)	Quake (1996)	The Fragile (1999)

Null numbers chronology
Null 0.5 (1996)	Null 01 (2010)

Quake is the soundtrack album to the 1996 id Software video game of the same name, composed by Trent Reznor and his industrial rock band Nine Inch Nails. It was released on June 22, 1996. Originally pressed on the same disc as the game, Quake was otherwise commercially unavailable until its release on vinyl in September 2020. Reznor also provided sound effects for the game.

== Recording and release ==
The collaboration between Nine Inch Nails and id Software occurred strictly due to a mutual admiration for each other's work; Reznor provided his services to Quake completely free of charge.

A vinyl LP edition of the soundtrack was released in 2020.

== Composition and content ==
"Damnation"
This clip from the seventh track showcases the soundtrack's eerie ambient nature.

Quake is a predominantly ambient soundtrack, and was Reznor's first experimentation with the genre. The music on Quake has been described as dark, immersive, and intended to accentuate the game's oppressive tone. The music is often called "subtle", "disturbing", and "hair-raising". About the soundtrack, Reznor said, "it is not music, it's textures and ambiences and whirling machine noises and stuff. We tried to make the most sinister, depressive, scary, frightening kind of thing [...] It's been fun."

== Critical reception ==
Professional ratings
Review scores
Source	Rating
AllMusic	2.5/5 stars

The Quake official soundtrack received positive reception, with many appreciating how the music builds upon the game's atmosphere. In his 1996 review of the game for GameSpot, Trent Ward wrote, "Simply put, this is the best soundtrack ever created for a computer game." Ward went on to write about how the eerie sounds and unsettling background noises heighten the game's already tense atmosphere. Major Mike of GamePro said that "With harsh, rockin' guitar riffs, and creepy low-key synthesizers, the music goes perfectly with each level and thoroughly enhances the overall atmosphere." Writing for Destructoid, Peter Glagowski said, "Not only did it show that the industry was moving beyond being targeted solely at children, but it pushed the action of its game into overdrive."

== Track listing ==
All music written and performed by Nine Inch Nails.

=== CD track listing ===
No.	Title	Length
2.	"Quake Theme"	5:08
3.	"Aftermath"	2:26
4.	"The Hall of Souls"	8:20
5.	"It Is Raped"	6:05
6.	"Parallel Dimensions"	7:24
7.	"Life"	8:38
8.	"Damnation"	5:35
9.	"Focus"	6:28
10.	"Falling"	3:32
11.	"The Reaction"	5:15
Total length:		58:53

=== Vinyl release track listing ===
Side one
No.	Title	Length
1.	"Quake Theme"	5:08
2.	"Aftermath"	2:26
3.	"The Hall of Souls"	8:20
Total length:		15:55

Side two
No.	Title	Length
1.	"It Is Raped"	6:05
2.	"Parallel Dimensions"	7:24
3.	"Life"	8:38
Total length:		22:07

Side three
No.	Title	Length
1.	"Damnation"	5:35
2.	"Focus"	6:28
3.	"Falling"	3:32
4.	"The Reaction"	5:15
Total length:		20:51 (58:53)

Notes

- Because the soundtrack is pressed onto the same disc as the game itself, track one is relegated to game data.
- Quake's original packaging provided no official song titles. Some fans came up with unofficial titles, most of the time linking the song to the name of the level in which it first appears. The titles seen above are taken from the 2020 vinyl re-issue, in which the official titles of the songs were finally revealed. The fourth side has no grooves, instead being etched with some of Quake's source code; the part of the source code being what triggers the game to play the CD audio tracks.

== Personnel ==
Credits adapted from the 2020 vinyl release.

- Trent Reznor – arranger, programming, producer
- Charlie Clouser, Robin Finck, Danny Lohner, Trent Reznor, Chris Vrenna – Nine Inch Nails (1996)
- Tom Baker – mastering
- John Crawford – art direction
- Corey Holms – design
- John Romero – war room photos
