= Saul Williams (album) =

Studio album by Saul Williams
- Released: September 21, 2004
- Genres: Hip-hop, punk rock, spoken word
- Length: 44:17
- Label: Fader Label
- Producers: Serj Tankian, Musa Bailey, Saul Williams, Mickey P, Thavius Beck

Saul Williams chronology
Not in My Name (2003)	Saul Williams (2004)	The Inevitable Rise and Liberation of NiggyTardust! (2007)

Singles from Saul Williams
- 1. "List of Demands (Reparations)" Released: 2004; 2. "Black Stacey" Released: 2004

Saul Williams is the second solo studio album by Saul Williams. It was released by Fader Label in 2004. It features contributions from Serj Tankian, Zack de la Rocha, and Isaiah "Ikey" Owens.

== Critical reception ==
Professional ratings
Review scores
Source	Rating
AllMusic	4/5 stars
The Austin Chronicle	3.5/5 stars
Drowned in Sound	10/10
Exclaim!	favorable
Pitchfork	7.2/10
PopMatters	favorable
Robert Christgau	(3-star Honorable Mention)
Stylus Magazine	D+
XLR8R	favorable

Adam Greenberg of AllMusic gave the album 4 stars out of 5, saying: "On his self-titled album, Williams moves toward a slightly more accessible format (compared to his previous, more poetry driven work) with twisted guitar lines, heavy bass thumps, and a closer stab at singing from time to time." Robert Gabriel of The Austin Chronicle gave the album 3.5 stars out of 5, saying: "Social, psychological, and cultural mores are run through a ringer of rap transformed as punk, metal, and jungle with Williams self-producing much of his own inflammatory cache." Mike Diver of Drowned in Sound gave the album a 10 out of 10, saying: "Its importance is absolute." Ari Levenfeld of PopMatters said, "Saul Williams' attempt to save hip hop is admirable, if not entirely successful."

== Track listing ==
All tracks are written by Saul Williams, except where noted.

No.	Title	Writer(s)	Length
1.	"Talk to Strangers"	Williams, Tankian	2:39
2.	"Grippo"	Williams, Bailey, Vardosi, Vardosi	3:03
3.	"Telegram"	Williams, Jenifer, Miller	3:30
4.	"Act III Scene 2 (Shakespeare)"	Williams, de la Rocha, Beck	4:19
5.	"List of Demands (Reparations)"		3:18
6.	"African Student Movement"		4:01
7.	"Black Stacey"		5:24
8.	"PG"		1:35
9.	"Surrender (A Second to Think)"		4:18
10.	"Control Freak"		4:14
11.	"Seaweed"	Williams, Todd	3:38
12.	"Notice of Eviction"		4:18

Australian edition bonus tracks
No.	Title	Length
13.	"Black Stacey" (The Bug Remix)	5:29
14.	"List of Demands (Reparations)" (Kid606 Remix)	3:45
15.	"Black Stacy" (Bravecaptain Remix)	6:44

Japanese edition bonus tracks
No.	Title	Length
13.	"List of Demands (Reparations)" (Kill Memory Crash Remix)	5:03
14.	"Black Stacey" (Deadbeat's Black Arkification Remix)	7:19

== Personnel ==
Credits adapted from liner notes.

Musicians

- Saul Williams – vocals, programming, production (3, 5, 6, 7, 8, 9, 10, 11, 12)
- Mickey P – co-production (3, 5, 6, 7, 8, 9, 10, 11, 12), programming (8), additional programming (2, 3, 5, 7), engineering, mixing
- Serj Tankian – production (1), piano (1), background vocals (1)
- Ani Maljian – background vocals (1)
- Musa Bailey – production (2), programming (2)
- Thavius Beck – production (4)
- Zack de la Rocha – additional vocals (4)
- Saturn – background vocals (5)
- Isaiah "Ikey" Owens – piano (7), organ (7)
- Mia Doi Todd – additional vocals (11)
- Carmen – background vocals (11)

Technical personnel

- Brandy Flower – design, photography
- Keba Konte – photography
- Katina Parker – photography
- Varshini Soobiah – photography
- Bridgette Yellen – photography

== Charts ==
Chart	Peak position
French Albums (SNEP)	197
