= Bird Box (soundtrack) =

2018 soundtrack album by Trent Reznor and Atticus Ross

Bird Box (Original Score)

Soundtrack album by Trent Reznor and Atticus Ross
- Released: January 7, 2019
- Recorded: 2018
- Genres: Ambient; electronic; industrial; experimental
- Length: 65:17
- Label: The Null Corporation
- Producers: Trent Reznor; Atticus Ross

Trent Reznor and Atticus Ross chronology
Mid90s (2018)	Bird Box (Original Score) (2019)	Waves (2019)

Bird Box (Original Score) is the score album for the 2018 film of the same name, composed by Trent Reznor and Atticus Ross. The score was published by Maisie Music Publishing, which accompanied the music catalogue for Netflix, the film's distributor and released by Reznor's The Null Corporation label on January 7, 2019, two weeks after the film's release through the band's website and later received a wide release on January 25. While the original album consisted only 10 tracks, the album was issued in a special edition vinyl box set on November 22, 2019, which contained 13 additional tracks.

In December 2019, Reznor was not favorable in the involvement of the film's score, and called it as a "waste of time".

== Release ==
Reznor and Ross shared the soundtrack listing on New Year's Day (January 1, 2019) through their band Nine Inch Nails' official website, with pre-orders beginning for the album. It was preceded with the 12-minute long cue "Outside" as the lead single. The album released on January 7, 2019, first at the band's website and later on Apple Music, Spotify, Amazon Music and other music streaming and digital providers on January 29. The original release was referred to the "abridged" version as the album consisted ten cues running for an hour long. The duo created "significant amount of music and conceptual sound" that were not present in the final version.

Though Reznor assured the "unabridged" version of the album would be released in spring, it was instead released on November 22, 2019, at a special edition vinyl box set through physical format while the digital version was only made available for purchase on the band's website. The 4-LP album consisted additional 13 tracks from the score, making the album over two hours long.

== Reception ==
=== Critical response ===
Sean T. Collins of Pitchfork rated 7.1 out of 10, saying "The soundtrack institution of Trent Reznor and Atticus Ross return to their well of ominousness and employ an array of techniques to convey anxiety, impending danger, and discomfort." Emily Yoshida from Vulture commented that Reznor and Ross' score is "going through the motions". Tim Grierson of Screen International commented that the score "feels like a faint echo of their earlier, better work". Todd McCarthy of The Hollywood Reporter called it as "atypical, ominous and vastly mood-enhancing", while Peter Travers of Rolling Stone called it as "haunting, hypnotic, palm-sweating score" and it "promises way more than the film delivers". Lewis Knight of Daily Mirror opined that Reznor and Ross' "thumping score" maintains the film's "chilling atmosphere".

=== Post-release ===
In December 2019, Reznor recalled his experience on working on the film's music as "f**king waste of time". He felt that some people "phoned in" during the scoring process, and slammed the production team, the film's editor for cutting down numerous cues from the film and the score mixer who had "mixed it too low, making it unable to hear". Ross, who had been handling the music production, arrangements, mixing and mastering could not do so for the film, as he and Reznor were on tour and supervised another person to mix the score.

== Track listing ==
Bird Box (Original Score) – "Abridged"
No.	Title	Length
1.	"Outside"	12:41
2.	"Undercurrents"	4:03
3.	"Looking Forwards and Backwards"	9:00
4.	"What Isn't Anymore"	7:48
5.	"Sleep Deprivation"	5:00
6.	"Careful What You Wish For"	7:29
7.	"A Hidden Moment"	3:06
8.	"And It Keeps on Coming"	7:14
9.	"Close Encounters"	4:38
10.	"Last Thing Left"	4:40
Total length:		65:39

Bird Box (Original Score) – "Unabridged" (expanded edition)
No.	Title	Length
1.	"Outside"	12:40
2.	"Undercurrents"	4:02
3.	"Looking Forwards & Backwards"	8:54
4.	"It Can Happen Here"	1:54
5.	"Sleep Deprivation"	5:01
6.	"Trespasser"	8:45
7.	"Still Feels"	2:29
8.	"What Isn't Anymore"	7:52
9.	"Careful What You Wish For"	7:25
10.	"And It Keeps On Coming"	7:18
11.	"Dreaming Forwards & Backwards"	9:06
12.	"A Hidden Moment"	3:11
13.	"Exposure"	7:27
14.	"Further Outside"	2:14
15.	"Can't Seem To Wake Myself Up"	6:54
16.	"Contagion A"	6:13
17.	"Contagion B"	4:16
18.	"Last Thing Left"	4:40
19.	"Contagion C"	2:42
20.	"So Much To See"	2:38
21.	"Incomplete Resolution"	2:34
22.	"Close Encounters"	4:31
23.	"Maybe This Is"	3:11
Total length:		125:57

== Credits ==
Adapted from liner notes:

- Art Direction – John Crawford
- Booking – Marc Geiger (WME)
- Project co-ordinator – Jeff Fura
- Engineers – Chris Richardson, Justin McGrath
- Lacquer cut – CB
- Legal advisor – Zia Modabber (Katten Munchin Rosenman, LLP), Ross Rosen (Ross B. Rosen & Associates, LLC)
- Artist management – Silva Artist Management
- Business management – Michael Walsh, William Harper (Gelfand, Rennet & Feldman)
- Mastered by – Tom Baker, Chris Bellman
- Mixed by – Atticus Ross
- Music composed, arranged, programmed and produced by – Atticus Ross, Trent Reznor
- Product manager – Jeremy Sponder, Monique McGuffin-Newman (Universal Music Enterprise)
