= The Inevitable Rise and Liberation of NiggyTardust! =

Studio album by Saul Williams
- Released: November 1, 2007
- Recorded: 2007; 1997-1999 (Skin of a drum)
- Genres: Industrial hip-hop, industrial rock
- Length: 60:44
- Label: Fader Label
- Producer: Trent Reznor

Saul Williams chronology
Saul Williams (2004)	The Inevitable Rise and Liberation of NiggyTardust! (2007)	Volcanic Sunlight (2011)

The Inevitable Rise and Liberation of NiggyTardust! is the third solo studio album by Saul Williams. It was released in 2007. It peaked at number 41 on the Billboard Heatseekers Albums chart, as well as number 89 on the Top R&B/Hip-Hop Albums chart. The album is entirely produced by Trent Reznor. The title of the album is a reference to David Bowie's 1972 album The Rise and Fall of Ziggy Stardust and the Spiders from Mars.

== Release ==
The album was available for purchase or free download at NiggyTardust.com. The website allowed users to pay $5 to support the artist and be given the choice of downloading a 192 kbit/s MP3 version, 320 kbit/s MP3 version or lossless FLAC version. Digital distribution of the album is provided by Musicane. Reznor publicised the album on the Nine Inch Nails website and mailing list, saying that "Saul's not the household name that Radiohead is" and urging fans to support him. This was a reference to Radiohead's In Rainbows, which was released in October on the band's own website with customers choosing how much they want to pay for the album. The free option has since been removed, with a message on the website claiming their intention had always been to remove it after 100,000 free downloads of the album.

It was announced at nin.com that, as of January 2, 2008, two months since its release, 154,449 people had downloaded NiggyTardust. Of that number, 28,322 people chose to pay the asked price of US$5 (US$141,610 Total). In comparison, Saul's self-titled album has sold 30,000 copies since its release in 2004.

A physical release of the album was released on July 8, 2008. It contained five bonus tracks.

== Critical reception ==
Professional ratings
Review scores
Source	Rating
AllMusic	4.5/5 stars
The A.V. Club	B+
Pitchfork	7.3/10
RapReviews.com	4.5/10
Robert Christgau	(3-star Honorable Mention)
Rolling Stone	3/5 stars

Thom Jurek of AllMusic gave the album 4.5 stars out of 5, saying: "This is Williams' finest moment, and interestingly, one of Reznor's, too."

Quentin B. Huff of PopMatters placed it at number 12 on the "101 Hip-Hop Albums of 2007" list.

== Track listing ==
All tracks are written by Saul Williams and Trent Reznor, except where noted.

No.	Title	Writer(s)	Length
1.	"Black History Month"	Williams, Reznor, Thavius Beck	3:15
2.	"Convict Colony"	Williams, Reznor, CX KiDTRONiK	3:24
3.	"Tr(n)igger"		3:54
4.	"Sunday Bloody Sunday"	Bono, The Edge, Adam Clayton, Larry Mullen Jr.	4:05
5.	"Break"		3:18
6.	"NiggyTardust"	Williams, Reznor, CX KiDTRONiK	3:40
7.	"DNA"	Williams, Reznor, Beck, Isaiah "Ikey" Owens	4:02
8.	"WTF!"	Williams, Reznor, CX KiDTRONiK	5:29
9.	"Scared Money"		3:48
10.	"Raw"		2:50
11.	"Skin of a Drum"		3:55
12.	"No One Ever Does"		3:14
13.	"Banged and Blown Through"		3:43
14.	"Raised to be Lowered"	Williams, Reznor, CX KiDTRONiK	5:22
15.	"The Ritual"		5:20
Total length:			60:44

Deluxe CD edition bonus tracks
No.	Title	Writer(s)	Length
16.	"Pedagogue of Young Gods"		3:18
17.	"World on Wheels"		1:27
18.	"Can't Hide Love"	Skip Scarborough	2:27
19.	"Gunshots by Computer"	Reznor	1:44
20.	"List of Demands (Reparations)"	Williams	3:18
Total length:			71:46

== Personnel ==
Credits adapted from liner notes.

Musicians

- Saul Williams – vocals, programming
- Trent Reznor – production, programming, backing vocals (5, 8)
- Atticus Ross – additional programming
- Thavius Beck – production (1, 7), programming (1, 7)
- CX KiDTRONiK – production, programming, backing vocals (1, 6)
- Isaiah "Ikey" Owens – keyboards (7)
- Xuly Azaro – backing vocals (9)
- Maryam Nalo Blacksher – viola (13)
- Gingger Shankar – double violin (13)
- Persia White – backing vocals (11)
- Alan Moulder – mixing
- Brian Gardner – mastering

Technical personnel

- Angelbert Metoyer – artwork
- Melody Ehsani – cover art, jewelry design
- Rob Sheridan – graphic design, layout

== Charts ==
Chart	Peak position
US Heatseekers Albums (Billboard)	41
US Top R&B/Hip-Hop Albums (Billboard)	89
