= I'll Enter Heaven Dancing =

- J'entrerai au ciel en dansant
- Directed by: François Lespés
- Produced by: Hubert de Torcy
- Narrated by: Dorcy Rugamba
- Production companies: SAJE and KTO
- Release date: 26 December 2016 (France)
- Running time: 52 mins
- Language: French

I'll Enter Heaven Dancing (original French title: J'entrerai au ciel en dansant) is a 2016 documentary film that gives account of how the Rwandan genocide ended the life of a Rwandan couple and most of their children.

== Synopsis ==
The film showed the life of Cyprien and Daphrose Rugamba from the difficult years of marriage until they were killed, together with 6 of their 10 children at their home in Kigali on the first day of the genocide.

== Production ==
The film is written and directed by François Lespés, and narrated by one of the couple's surviving sons, the playwright, stage director, dancer, and actor Dorcy Rugamba. The film was produced by Francophone European Catholic television network KTO and Hubert de Torcy of SAJE.

The title originates from Cyprien's answer to the soldiers who asked, after rounding his family up before massacring them in their home, if he was a Christian. Cyprien replied with the verse of one of his own songs: "J'entrerai au ciel en dansant!" ("Yes... and I will enter heaven dancing!").

The Catholic Church opened their process for beatification of the couple in September 2015.

The film was released on 26 December 2016.
