= Patriots Day (soundtrack) =

Film score by Trent Reznor and Atticus Ross
- Released: January 13, 2017
- Recorded: 2016
- Genres: Ambient; electronic
- Length: 68:37
- Label: Lakeshore
- Producers: Trent Reznor; Atticus Ross

Trent Reznor and Atticus Ross chronology
Before the Flood (2016)	Patriots Day (2017)	The Vietnam War (2017)

Patriots Day is the score album for Peter Berg's 2016 film of the same name, composed by Trent Reznor and Atticus Ross. The album was released digitally on January 13, 2017, through Lakeshore Records. It is the fifth film score composed by the duo.

== Background ==
Reznor and Ross had composed three soundtracks for David Fincher which earned them widespread acclaim and an Academy Award for The Social Network (2010).

For their next project they aimed to find something that "felt unfamiliar". Reznor told Deadline Hollywood "What lured us in was the challenge of seeing if we could try to color outside the lines a little bit of what music might be expected to do in a picture like that."

As part of the research for the soundtrack the two were given access to previously unreleased FBI files surrounding the events of the Boston Marathon bombing that the film was based on.

== Production ==
Reznor and Ross composed the entire soundtrack together in the studio, with Reznor playing all the instruments and Ross handling the arrangements. They worked simultaneously on Nine Inch Nails's 2016 EP Not the Actual Events and The Vietnam War soundtrack (2017). Most of the piano and live strings were filtered through a specially built for the purpose device which consisted of "two tape machines hooked to a computer, where it just endlessly locks something in and copies from one to the next, each one degenerating another time. [...] Leave it overnight and it's unrecognizable, but it does it in a way that's interesting, that's warm and nostalgic." About 30 of these pieces were created and left to play for different amounts of time in order to "invoke the sense of memory or place" for the more emotional motifs.

The more aggressive chase music was then built on top of that groundwork with each of the five film storylines having its own thematic basis. The sound of "a dentist scraping on a tooth" was sampled to create the propulsive rhythm of some scenes. For the minutes before the bombing, however, they decided to not employ direct tension but have Reznor play the piano in a way that creates "a sense of dread that's building up".

Reznor noted that unlike their previous experience of working on David Fincher's films who had their scores "more subtly woven into the DNA of the picture", Berg kept demanding "more music" from them in order to have a way to bridge film scenes. Ross wanted to avoid scoring the bombing with "thundering drums" like the ones heard in similar films of the genre. They also wanted to not "punish people too much" considering the subject matter and instead wanted to reflect "heartfelt sincerity and humanity."

Most of the picture was already filmed when the two signed on to do the score. However, Reznor found frustration in the fact that all new scenes kept getting added and old ones kept getting removed, which forced them to focus on composing "suites of themes that could interact with each other" and be easily changed according to the film changes. He told Collider,

Our first priority is to be in service to the picture and do what's right, but as composers, we're also trying to make something that feels like it has an introduction and can set up some expectations or themes that can be explored later, so that when you hear it, you realize that you heard it in a different context and it ties into something that feels like it resolves. But all of that was a deck of cards that had been thrown on the floor, and as you're putting them in order, someone takes a wind blower and blows them again. It gets difficult.

== Track listing ==
All music is composed by Trent Reznor and Atticus Ross.

No.	Title	Length
1.	"Them and Us"	4:18
2.	"We Forget Who We Are"	4:56
3.	"The Place You Are Right Now"	7:06
4.	"Inquiries"	4:38
5.	"Trails"	5:54
6.	"Broken Glass"	5:05
7.	"Nobody Cares About Me"	4:13
8.	"The Night Drive"	12:14
9.	"Escape"	6:34
10.	"Terminus"	2:55
11.	"Long Shadows on the Street"	7:10
12.	"Resolve"	3:34
Total length:		68:37

=== Award FYC album ===
An alternate album For Your Consideration (FYC) was sent by CBS Films/Lionsgate to awarding bodies. It features the actual film cues, which have alternate titles, edits and mixes from the versions on the commercially available soundtrack.

All tracks are written by Trent Reznor and Atticus Ross.

Disc 1
No.	Title	Length
1.	"Couples & Brothers"	7:15
2.	"Donuts & Legs"	2:31
3.	"Fornicator"	2:06
4.	"Twenty Six Seconds"	0:47
5.	"Arrival"	3:18
6.	"Dread"	3:08
7.	"Bombs"	6:31
8.	"FBI"	2:29
9.	"Black Falcon"	1:26
10.	"Hospital & Whole Milk"	5:37
11.	"Vigil"	1:59
12.	"Tommy Breaks Down"	3:54
13.	"Left of Boom"	4:07
14.	"Obama & Coffee"	2:03
15.	"Roommates"	2:27
16.	"Backpack & Brothers to M.I.T."	2:31
17.	"Shoot Seann"	1:14
18.	"Car Jack"	4:16
19.	"Drive to Watertown"	6:20
20.	"Escape"	6:26
21.	"Shoot Out"	3:30

Disc 2
No.	Title	Length
1.	"Tamerlan"	2:47
2.	"Manhunt"	2:11
3.	"They Got the Wife"	0:15
4.	"Interrogation"	4:40
5.	"Watchlisted"	1:08
6.	"Good Versus Evil"	2:58
7.	"The Boat"	1:03
8.	"SWAT"	2:13
9.	"Capture & Fenway"	4:22
10.	"Interviews"	5:06
11.	"Main Titles"	2:09
12.	"End Crawl" (Listed on the packaging, but not included on the disc)	2:44
