= Fidesco International =

Catholic development organization

Fidesco is a Catholic non-governmental organization for volunteering to development projects in countries in the global south, founded in 1981, and is run by the Emmanuel Community, following a meeting in the Vatican City with African bishops.

Volunteers who leave with Fidesco are singles, couples or families, young people, adults or retired, wishing in the name of their faith to work for the marginalized: this explains the name of FIDES - CO : faith and co-operation. They aim put their professional skills at the service of development projects, to help local populations or humanitarian actions.

== Mission work ==
Fidesco International is a religious based missions origination. They put themselves at the service of partners of the local Catholic Church, in answer to a need and a request. These partners already work for the good of disadvantaged populations, regardless of religion, ethnicity or culture, in very diverse fields: education, teaching, management, construction, health... and in varied establishments: dispensaries, refugee camps, centers for street children, agricultural schools. The volunteers for its humanitarian missions serve for one to two years.

As of 2021 the NGO is present in 23 countries in Africa, South America and Asia. It is one of the largest volunteer based NGO's in France.

== Organization of Fidesco ==
Fidesco is more and more present on the international stage and sends volunteers on mission from countries as far apart as Belgium, Australia and Brazil... Fidesco now has 11 offices all over the world: in France, Belgium, Germany, Portugal, Netherlands, Austria, Poland, the United States, Australia, Democratic Republic of Congo and Rwanda.

Fidesco has been granted the status of "Volunteer Organization of International solidarity" by the French Ministry of Foreign Affairs (VSI, statute defined by law of the 23/02/05).

In France Fidesco is rated an association of public utility and is member of the Coordination-South, CLONG-Voluntariat (Committee of Connected Volunteer ONG's) and the National Council of Solidarity. Globally Fidesco is part of the Pontifical Council Cor Unum.

Fidesco is an NGO (non-governmental organization). It is a charitable organization (law 1901) judged an association of public utility and therefore entitled to receive gifts and legacies.

== See also ==
- Catholic Church
- Catholicism
- Evangelism
- Mission
- Catholic mission
- Missionary
- Catholic social teaching
- Caritas Internationalis
