= Musicane =

Musicane was a social shopping and discovery network founded by internet entrepreneurs Sudhin Shahani, Kale McNaney, and Josh Zibit. Users could feature, recommend, and find new music and products through feeds and themed mixes, and broadcast to all their existing online communities. Every user had their own Musicane widget which could be embedded on websites, social network pages, and blogs. The widgets directly retailed music and physical products and contained all the user's featured items, mixes and media. Musicane offered all their users affiliate commissions on all music they helped sell.

In September 2006, The Black Eyed Peas' will.i.am joined Musicane as head of the company's marketing department.

Musicane garnered attention for partnering with Lil Wayne to sell Tha Carter III Direct-to-Fan via his website and widget and spreading 54,000 widgets in 1 week. They also distributed Saul Williams' album Niggy Tardust. Nine Inch Nails frontman Trent Reznor came out in support of the company's distribution services in an interview with New York Magazine.

Musicane ceased operations in 2009.

== Artists Using Musicane ==
- The Black Eyed Peas
- Saul Williams
- Lil' Wayne
- Sugarland
- Jason Mraz
- Ashanti
- Teddy Geiger
- Brazilian Girls
- Steve Aoki
- Elvis Costello
- Julianne Hough
- Carter's Chord
- Henry Rollins
- A Change of Pace
- 2 Pistols
- Prima J
- Beer For My Horses
- Def Leppard
- Night Ranger
- Thenewno2
