= Not in My Name =

EP by Saul Williams
- Released: May 20, 2003
- Genre: Alternative hip-hop
- Label: Synchronic
- Producers: Yoga, Paul D. Miller (exec.)

Saul Williams chronology
Amethyst Rock Star (2001)	Not in My Name (2003)	Saul Williams (2004)

Not in My Name is an EP by Saul Williams, released in May 2003.

Professional ratings
Review scores
Source	Rating
AllMusic	3/5 stars

== Track listing ==
1. "The Pledge" (Live @ Central Park)
2. "September 12th"
3. "Bloodletting"
4. "The Pledge" (Remix) (DJ Goo)
5. "Not in Our Name" (Remix) (DJ Spooky)
6. "The Pledge" (Ill Bootleg MP3 Remix) (DJ Spooky)
7. "The Pledge" (Remix) (Coldcut)
8. "Give Blood" (Phantom Dancehall Mix) (DJ Spooky)

== See also ==
- List of anti-war songs
