= Waves (soundtrack) =

2019 film soundtrack album

Waves (Original Motion Picture Soundtrack)

Film score by Trent Reznor and Atticus Ross
- Released: December 6, 2019
- Recorded: 2019
- Genre: Film score
- Length: 77:21
- Label: The Null Corporation
- Producers: Trent Reznor; Atticus Ross

Trent Reznor chronology
Watchmen (2019)	Waves (2019)	Mank (2020)

Atticus Ross chronology
Watchmen (2019)	Waves (2019)	Earthquake Bird (2019)

Waves (Original Motion Picture Soundtrack) is the film score to the 2019 film Waves directed by Trey Edward Shults starring Kelvin Harrison Jr., Taylor Russell, Lucas Hedges, Alexa Demie, Renée Elise Goldsberry and Sterling K. Brown. The original score is composed by Trent Reznor and Atticus Ross and released through The Null Corporation label on December 6, 2019.

== Development ==
In July 2018, it was announced that Trent Reznor and Atticus Ross would compose the score for Waves. Initially, Brian McOmber who composed for Shults' previous films, declined his offer to score the film considering the use of several pre-existing songs that had been included in the script. However, Reznor contacted Shults via his agent through an email considering that he was a fan of his work and wanted to meet him. Accepting the offer, Shults met Reznor and Ross at a lunch in Los Angeles and sent him the script and despite the skepticism on the pre-recorded music, the musician duo agreed to score as they liked the script and it was "exciting and different" for the duo. Shults added that part of the score was feeling like the subconscious of the characters coming out and their music linking to their spirits which intrigued the composers on using the sonic landscape of the environment musically, like the voices of the kids, train sounds, wrestling and nature, and manipulating them and using it as music to combine with piano melodies.

== Release ==
The soundtrack to Waves was released through The Null Corporation label on December 6, 2019, after being made available for premiere on the Nine Inch Nails online store, ten days earlier.

== Reception ==
Peter Bradshaw of The Guardian called it "a wonderful score by Trent Reznor and Atticus Ross." Brian Tallerico of RogerEbert.com called it "a tension-raising score by Atticus Ross & Trent Reznor". Markie Robson-Scott of The Arts Desk wrote "[the] wonderful score by Trent Reznor and Atticus Ross [is] blended with a soundtrack featuring songs by Frank Ocean, Animal Collective, Kendrick Lamar, Kanye West, Amy Winehouse and others. And this wall-to-wall music, along with the pulsating, often abstract use of colour, makes the film an overpoweringly sensuous experience."

Peter Debruge of Variety wrote "Shults clearly has his own ideas, using a stream of unexpected but meticulously chosen music tracks to communicate the emotional register throughout. At times, those cues — made seamless by composers Trent Reznor and Atticus Ross (“The Social Network”) — feel like one with the film’s sound design, echoing the buzz of a vibrating cellphone or a series of background beeps, whereas at others, they represent what words can’t convey." Pamela Hutchinson of Sight and Sound wrote "Trent Reznor and Atticus Ross’s excellent score, mostly pushed aside for a hip jukebox soundtrack, provides so much throbbing nervousness [...] It’s almost unbearable, as everything should be in this amped-up teen-melo mode."

Alex Godfrey of Empire called it a "foreboding but fuzzy score". Alison Willmore of Vulture described it as an "incredible, near wall-to-wall [...] score from Trent Reznor and Atticus Ross". Adam White of The Independent called it a "characteristically jittery score".

== Track listing ==
No.	Title	Length
1.	"Everything Burns"	1:05
2.	"Bad News"	3:00
3.	"I'm Disappearing"	5:04
4.	"Odds Against"	5:15
5.	"Holding It Together"	2:36
6.	"Feedback Loop"	11:15
7.	"After the Fire"	3:56
8.	"Nobody Home"	3:04
9.	"The Light Shines Through"	10:23
10.	"Forgetting"	1:53
11.	"How to Begin?"	0:52
12.	"Wounds Heal"	22:30
13.	"Ties"	2:12
14.	"Leaving Missouri"	4:16
Total length:		77:21

== Accolades ==
Award	Date of ceremony	Category	Recipient(s)	Result	Ref(s)
Austin Film Critics Association	February 7, 2020	Best Score	Trent Reznor and Atticus Ross	Nominated	
Black Reel Awards	February 6, 2020	Outstanding Original Score	Trent Reznor and Atticus Ross	Nominated	
Hollywood Critics Association	January 11, 2020	Best Score	Trent Reznor and Atticus Ross	Nominated	
Motion Picture Sound Editors	January 19, 2020	Outstanding Achievement in Sound Editing - Music Score for Feature Film	Sally Boldt, Trey Edward Shults, Johnnie Burn	Won	
St. Louis Film Critics Association	December 15, 2019	Best Soundtrack	Waves	2nd place	
