= Mid90s (soundtrack) =

Mid90s (Original Music from the Motion Picture)

Soundtrack album by Trent Reznor and Atticus Ross
- Released: October 19, 2018
- Genres: Ambient; electronic
- Length: 12:47
- Label: The Null Corporation
- Producers: Trent Reznor; Atticus Ross

Trent Reznor and Atticus Ross chronology
The Vietnam War (2017)	Mid90s (Original Music from the Motion Picture) (2018)	Bird Box (2018)

Mid90s (Original Music from the Motion Picture) is a soundtrack EP by Trent Reznor and Atticus Ross for Jonah Hill's film of the same name. It was released digitally on October 19, 2018 through Reznor's label The Null Corporation. It peaked at number 41 on the Billboard Independent Albums chart.

The film also features a selection of songs from the 1990s supervised by Hill, in particular hip hop from the period.

== Production ==
Reznor and Ross agreed to score Mid90s after Jonah Hill contacted them through producer Scott Rudin (with whom they had worked on The Social Network and The Girl with the Dragon Tattoo) despite the very low budget of the film. They communicated only via Skype. Hill asked for them to capture the "sound of the elation and the confusion and the pain of childhood", which Reznor found exciting since it was a theme that he hadn't explored with Nine Inch Nails. Hill also chose the duo because he wanted to hear what their interpretation of "warmth" would be, as a contrast to the "coldness and lack of connection" displayed in their previous soundtracks.

The film was scored in hotel rooms and backstages during Nine Inch Nails' 2018 European tour. Trent Reznor said "I remember we got to the Royal Albert Hall early and finished the closing credits cue and then went on stage".

== Critical reception ==
Rolling Stone called it "surprisingly sweet" and "a great standalone piece" and compared the ambient compositions to those of Brian Eno.

== Track listing ==
All tracks are written by Trent Reznor and Atticus Ross.

No.	Title	Length
1.	"The Start of Things"	2:55
2.	"Big Wide World"	3:19
3.	"Finding a Place"	3:11
4.	"Further Along"	3:22
Total length:		12:47

== Charts ==
Chart	Peak position
US Independent Albums (Billboard)	41
