= Queer (soundtrack) =

Queer (Original Score)

Film score by Trent Reznor and Atticus Ross
- Released: December 6, 2024
- Length: 49:21
- Label: Milan
- Producers: Trent Reznor; Atticus Ross; Jacob Moreno

Trent Reznor chronology
Challengers (Original Score) (2024)	Queer (Original Score) (2024)	The Gorge (2025)

Atticus Ross chronology
Shōgun (Original Soundtrack) (2024)	Queer (Original Score) (2024)	The Gorge (2025)

Queer (Original Score) is the score album composed by the Nine Inch Nails frontmen Trent Reznor and Atticus Ross. The album accompanies the 2024 period romantic drama film Queer directed by Luca Guadagnino, starring Daniel Craig and Drew Starkey. The film marked the duo's third consecutive collaboration with Guadagnino.

== Development ==
Trent Reznor and Atticus Ross composed the score for Queer, marking their third collaboration with Guadagnino following Bones and All (2022) and Challengers (2024). The score was more orchestral than their work for previous films with Guadagnino and had to capture the mind space of an alcoholic, longing-in-love writer who chases an elusive lover. In the scene, Craig and Starkey's characters take ayahuasca and engage in a choreography which they felt like "ballet on LSD".

The duo approached in the way as an overture melody for a classic Hollywood musical, where all the motifs and elements of the score blend together. They added that the idea of ayahuasca's scene in depth where the listeners heard various themes between Allerton and Lee leading up to that moment, and as they take ayahuasca, the duo came up with the process of treating the music into a more psychedelic version. Much of the bits of music to their relationship, were hidden in that scene and in terms of hitting the beats of their dance, it worked with the picture. They recalled on the composition for a choreography of the "unexpected trap" scene in Challengers as a basis for this scene.

Reznor and Ross collaborated with composer Caetano Veloso and R&B singer-songwriter Omar Apollo, who also starred in the film. Apollo performed the Spanish-language song "Te Maldigo" which was featured in the end credits with additional arrangements by the duo. Veloso performed the first track "Vaster than Empires" with Reznor, and featured lyrics from Burroughs' final diary entry. Another version of the song featured Alan Sparhawk and BJ Burton performing the vocals instead of Veloso.

== Release ==
The song "Te Maldigo" was released as the first single from the album on November 22, 2024. The album featuring the original score was released on December 6, 2024, through Milan Records. The single version of "Vaster than Empires" was released on December 13, 2024. A vinyl edition of the film's soundtrack was announced nearly a year later, in November 2025 and scheduled to be released on December 12, 2025.

== Track listing ==
All music is composed by Trent Reznor and Atticus Ross; William S. Burroughs is additionally credited as a writer on "Vaster than Empires".

Queer (Original Score) track listing
No.	Title	Length
1.	"Vaster than Empires" (with Caetano Veloso)	3:52
2.	"Pure Love"	4:34
3.	"Centipede"	1:25
4.	"God Had to Create"	2:53
5.	"Thinking Is Not Enough"	3:00
6.	"The Saddest Man in the World"	1:56
7.	"That's Him"	3:35
8.	"Wouldn't You?"	1:39
9.	"Love Would Shatter"	4:40
10.	"Place of Failure"	4:04
11.	"Real Enough"	1:51
12.	"No Holy Grail"	2:49
13.	"No Final Satori"	3:53
14.	"No Final Solution"	0:58
15.	"Just Conflict"	1:36
16.	"Love"	6:29

Notes

- "Love" is stylized as "LOVE."

== Reception ==
Bill Pearis of BrooklynVegan wrote "Reznor and Ross' score is decidedly warm and organic, full of strings and woodwinds which befit the '50s setting." Claire Biddles of The Wire wrote "repeated melodic themes are a common tool in soundtrack music, but Reznor and Ross utilise them in a thematically appropriate and emotionally devastating way [...] the music is at the edge of oversentimentality, almost embarrassingly confessional." Tom Breihan of Stereogum wrote "There's a hushed, jazz-influenced feel to this one, and the sound design is layered and elaborate."

Damon Wise of Deadline Hollywood called it a "terrific industrial-jazzy score by Trent Reznor and Atticus Ross". David Rooney of The Hollywood Reporter wrote "After their pounding beats energized Challengers, Trent Reznor and Atticus Ross shift gears with a score drenched in melancholy feeling, shaping the mood along with invigorating blasts of non-period tracks by New Order, Nirvana, Sinéad O’Connor and Prince, among others." Liz Shannon Miller of Consequence wrote "Essential to this is Trent Reznor and Atticus Ross's score, as the composers reunite with Guadagnino for a soundtrack that's not quite the club banger that Challengers was, but enhances the film's romantic, transportive qualities — as well as the moments which evolve into surrealism."

Ty Burr of The Washington Post described it as "a score by Trent Reznor and Atticus Ross that dreams of a heaven none of us deserves." Ross Bonaime of Collider wrote "Guadagnino has once again teamed up with Trent Reznor and Atticus Ross for the music here, and like Challengers, this duo finds just the right tone and mood to fit Guadagnino's story in every situation."

== Additional music ==
The film itself includes numerous tracks by prominent artists including: Nirvana, Sinéad O’Connor, New Order, Prince, Italian alternative rock band Verdena, and jazz musicians Benny Goodman, Charlie Parker, and Dizzy Gillespie.

- "All Apologies", performed by Sinéad O'Connor
- "Sin Ti", performed by Trío Los Panchos
- "Mi Corazon", performed by Rafael Mendez and His Orchestra
- "Muchos Besos", performed by Martin Y Malena
- "Come As You Are", performed by Nirvana
- "Darktown Strutters Ball", performed by Benny Goodman
- "La Malaguena"
- "Para Que Mentir", performed by Lydia Mendoza
- "Begin The Beguine", performed by The Bill Danzeisen Big Band Orchestra
- "Yes Sir, That’s My Baby", performed by Eddie Cantor
- "Marigold", performed by Nirvana
- "17 Days (Piano & A Microphone 1983 Version)", performed by Prince
- "Y Andale", performed by Capitan Chinaco Y Sus Guerrilleros, Polvorita and Trio Las Provincianas
- "Roses of Picardy", performed by Frankie Laine
- "Perdido", performed by Charlie Parker, Dizzy Gillespie, Bud Powell, Max Roach and Charles Mingus
- "Sui Ghiacciai", performed by Verdena
- "Do I Worry?", performed by The Ink Spots
- "Leave Me Alone", performed by New Order
- "Riders In The Sky (A Cowboy Legend)", performed by Vaughn Monroe and His Orchestra
- "Musicology", performed by Prince
