= Anisia Uzeyman =

Rwandan actress and playwright

Anisziya Uwizeyimana
- Born: Anisia Uzeyman; 1975 (age 50–51); Mbazi, Rwanda
- Occupations: actress, playwright, director, producer

Anisia Uzeyman (born Anisziya Uwizeyimana, February 1975) is a Rwandan actress and playwright. She is most noted as codirector with Saul Williams of the 2021 film Neptune Frost. She was born at Gihindamuyaga in Mbazi, Rwanda.

== Filmography ==
Year	Film	Actor	Writer	Director	Producer	Notes
2002	The Nest	✓	✗	✗	✗	Feature Film
2012	Aujourd'hui	✓	✗	✗	✗	Feature Film
2016	Ayiti Mon Amour	✓	✗	✗	✓	Feature Film
2016	Dreamstates	✓	✓	✓	✓	Feature Film
2021	Neptune Frost	✗	✗	✓	✗	Feature Film
