= MartyrLoserKing =

Studio album by Saul Williams
- Released: January 29, 2016
- Genre: Alternative hip-hop
- Length: 41:33
- Label: Fader Label
- Producer: Saul Williams

Saul Williams chronology
Volcanic Sunlight (2011)	MartyrLoserKing (2016)	Encrypted & Vulnerable (2019)

Singles from MartyrLoserKing
- 1. "Burundi" Released: April 21, 2015

MartyrLoserKing (sometimes stylized as Martyr Loser King) is the fifth solo studio album by Saul Williams. It was released by Fader Label on January 29, 2016. It includes guest appearances from Emily Kokal and Haleek Maul.

== Critical reception ==
Professional ratings
Aggregate scores
Source	Rating
Metacritic	78/100
Review scores
Source	Rating
AllMusic	4/5 stars
Clash	7/10
Exclaim!	8/10
MusicOMH	4/5 stars
Pitchfork	7.1/10
The Skinny	3/5 stars
Vice	A−

At Metacritic, which assigns a weighted average score out of 100 to reviews from mainstream critics, the album received an average score of 78% based on 17 reviews, indicating "generally favorable reviews".

Sam Walker-Smart of Clash gave the album a 7 out of 10, describing it as "a fevered slice of righteous rage moving at breakneck speed, filled to the brim with unsettling production and vivid imaginary." Bekki Bemrose of MusicOMH gave the album 4 stars out of 5, saying, "This collection of songs is a stark contrast to much of the politically neutered output of many contemporary musicians."

== Track listing ==
No.	Title	Length
1.	"Groundwork"	4:15
2.	"Horn of the Clock-Bike"	3:35
3.	"Ashes"	2:52
4.	"Think Like They Book Say"	3:53
5.	"The Bear/Coltan as Cotton"	4:18
6.	"Burundi" (featuring Emily Kokal)	4:05
7.	"The Noise Came from Here"	2:39
8.	"Down for Some Ignorance"	2:24
9.	"Roach Eggs"	4:23
10.	"All Coltrane Solos at Once" (featuring Haleek Maul)	3:23
11.	"No Different"	2:28
12.	"Homes/Drones/Poems/Drums"	3:18

== Charts ==
Chart	Peak position
US Heatseekers Albums (Billboard)	11
US Independent Albums (Billboard)	30
US Rap Albums (Billboard)	23
US Top R&B/Hip-Hop Albums (Billboard)	37
