= Mank (soundtrack) =

Film score by Trent Reznor and Atticus Ross
- Released: December 4, 2020
- Recorded: 2020
- Genres: Period; experimental; orchestral; ambient; contemporary jazz
- Length: 93:32
- Label: The Null Corporation
- Producers: Trent Reznor; Atticus Ross

Trent Reznor and Atticus Ross chronology
Waves (2019)	Mank (2020)	Soul (2020)

Mank (Original Music Score) is the score album for David Fincher's 2020 film of the same name, composed by Trent Reznor and Atticus Ross. It was released by The Null Corporation label on December 4, 2020, coinciding with the worldwide release on Netflix. The film marks Fincher's fourth collaboration with Reznor and Ross after the Academy Award-winning score for The Social Network (2010), The Girl with the Dragon Tattoo (2011) and Gone Girl (2014). Both Reznor and Ross used period-authentic instrumentation from the 1930s and 40s, instead of their synth-heavy style. The orchestral sections were performed by each members at their homes, due to the COVID-19 pandemic lockdown.

The score album featured 52-tracks with a duration of one-and-a-half hours, upon the initial release. A vinyl edition of the soundtrack was released in 2023. In addition, an extended soundtrack consisting of 87 tracks with a duration of three-and-a-half hours, was released through Reznor and Ross' blog on the online music distributor Bandcamp. The bonus content featured 35 tracks of unreleased music and demos that were not featured in the film.

The score received positive response from critics and listeners, appreciating Reznor and Ross, for the period setting and instrumentation saying that "it takes back to the 1930s" Following the reception, the film score received nominations from several award ceremonies, including Golden Globe, Academy and BAFTA. However, the awards at the major ceremonies went to Soul, which was also composed by Trent Reznor and Atticus Ross, Along with John Batiste.

== Development ==
Mank marked Trent Reznor and Atticus Ross' fourth consecutive collaboration with Fincher after The Social Network (2010), The Girl with the Dragon Tattoo (2011) and Gone Girl (2014), confirming their association in December 2019. Fincher did not have any pre-conceived musical approach while writing the script, but the team decided for a period-setting score reflecting Bernard Herrmann's composition for Citizen Kane (1941). Thus, Reznor and Ross used period-authentic instrumentation from the 1930s and 1940s, instead of their synth-heavy style, to accompany the film. (Note: Reznor and Ross earlier used period instrumentation for the sixth episode in the HBO original series Watchmen (2019).) The duo stated that "[Ross and I] were intimidated, as usual, but I think any good project starts with a level of discomfort [...] we were looking for something that's interesting and would feel, if it was in 1940, would be an experimental approach to how it would sound." They called scoring a period film was "challenging" as the score was highly unconventional, calling it as "a pre-modern story in postmodern clothes".

The musical palette ranges from big-band arrangements and percussive, jazz, orchestral pieces, strings and other period instruments to imitate Herrmann's style for Citizen Kane. In an interview with The New-York Magazine, Fincher stated that "The music has been recorded with older microphones, so it has a sort of sizzle and wheeze around the edges — you get it from strings, but you mostly get it from brass. What you're hearing is a revival house — an old theatre playing a movie."

As a result of the COVID-19 pandemic, each member of the orchestra recorded their sections for the score from home. Ross said that "When those sessions were presented to us, and we hit the spacebar, and we just heard the raw piece play, it sounded incredible. I thought I couldn't believe it". The first listen of the soundtrack was released on Reznor's private website on October 21, 2020. This featured over official stills and more than 200 behind-the-scenes footage regarding the making of the film. The soundtrack list was also released on the website on that date. While releasing the additional compositions, the band Nine Inch Nails had stated that "These are additional and alternate compositions that didn't get used in the film along with a selection of Trent and Atticus demos pre-orchestration".

== Track listing ==
Mank (Original Musical Score)
No.	Title	Length
1.	"Welcome to Victorville"	2:15
2.	"Trapped!"	1:17
3.	"All This Time"	2:01
4.	"Enter Menace"	0:48
5.	"First Dictation"	2:22
6.	"A Fool's Paradise"	1:33
7.	"Once More Unto the Breach"	2:05
8.	"About Something"	0:54
9.	"Glendale Station"	1:16
10.	"What's at Stake?"	0:53
11.	"Every Thing You Do"	3:01
12.	"Cowboys and Indians"	1:20
13.	"Presumed Lost"	1:09
14.	"(If Only You Could) Save Me"	3:18
15.	"Means of Escape"	0:49
16.	"All this Time (A White Parasol)"	0:34
17.	"M.G.M."	2:51
18.	"A Respectable Bribe"	1:03
19.	"I, Governor of California"	1:32
20.	"A Leaden Silence"	0:54
21.	"San Simeon Waltz"	4:55
22.	"Time Running Out"	0:44
23.	"Mank-heim"	1:24
24.	"Lend Me a Buck?"	1:20
25.	"You Wanted to See Me?"	1:03
26.	"In Your Arms Again"	3:18
27.	"The Dark Night of the Soul"	1:09
28.	"Clouds Gather"	0:13
29.	"Way Back When"	3:19
30.	"An Idea Takes Hold"	3:40
31.	"Marion's Exit"	3:18
32.	"Absolution"	1:05
33.	"Scenes from Election Night"	4:23
34.	"Election Night-mare"	1:31
35.	"All This Time (Dance Interrupted)"	1:01
36.	"All This Time (Victorious)"	1:12
37.	"I'm Eve"	0:32
38.	"A Rare Bird"	2:10
39.	"Look at What We Did"	2:30
40.	"Menace Returns"	0:33
41.	"Forgive Me"	2:15
42.	"Final Regards"	1:11
43.	"Where Else Would I Be?"	1:04
44.	"The Organ Grinder"	1:52
45.	"All This Time (Not No More)"	1:13
46.	"Costume Party"	1:10
47.	"Dulcinea"	0:37
48.	"Shoot-out at the OK Corral"	1:42
49.	"The Organ Grinder's Monkey"	2:24
50.	"The Act of Purging Violence"	0:38
51.	"All This Time (Happily Ever After)"	2:26
52.	"A Rare Bird (Reprise)"	4:45
Total length:		93:32

Mank (Original Musical Score – Extended)
No.	Title	Length
1.	"Welcome to Victorville"	2:15
2.	"Trapped!"	1:17
3.	"All This Time"	2:01
4.	"Enter Menace"	0:48
5.	"First Dictation"	2:22
6.	"A Fool's Paradise"	1:33
7.	"Once More Unto the Breach"	2:05
8.	"About Something"	0:54
9.	"Glendale Station"	1:16
10.	"What's at Stake?"	0:53
11.	"Every Thing You Do"	3:01
12.	"Cowboys and Indians"	1:20
13.	"Presumed Lost"	1:09
14.	"(If Only You Could) Save Me"	3:18
15.	"Means of Escape"	0:49
16.	"All this Time (A White Parasol)"	0:34
17.	"M.G.M."	2:51
18.	"A Respectable Bribe"	1:03
19.	"I, Governor of California"	1:32
20.	"A Leaden Silence"	0:54
21.	"San Simeon Waltz"	4:55
22.	"Time Running Out"	0:44
23.	"Mank-heim"	1:24
24.	"Lend Me a Buck?"	1:20
25.	"You Wanted to See Me?"	1:03
26.	"In Your Arms Again"	3:18
27.	"The Dark Night of the Soul"	1:09
28.	"Clouds Gather"	0:13
29.	"Way Back When"	3:19
30.	"An Idea Takes Hold"	3:40
31.	"Marion's Exit"	3:18
32.	"Absolution"	1:05
33.	"Scenes from Election Night"	4:23
34.	"Election Night-mare"	1:31
35.	"All This Time (Dance Interrupted)"	1:01
36.	"All This Time (Victorious)"	1:12
37.	"I'm Eve"	0:32
38.	"A Rare Bird"	2:10
39.	"Look at What We Did"	2:30
40.	"Menace Returns"	0:33
41.	"Forgive Me"	2:15
42.	"Final Regards"	1:11
43.	"Where Else Would I Be?"	1:04
44.	"The Organ Grinder"	1:52
45.	"All This Time (Not No More)"	1:13
46.	"Costume Party"	1:10
47.	"Dulcinea"	0:37
48.	"Shoot-out at the OK Corral"	1:42
49.	"The Organ Grinder's Monkey"	2:24
50.	"The Act of Purging Violence"	0:38
51.	"All This Time (Happily Ever After)"	2:26
52.	"A Rare Bird (Reprise)"	4:45
53.	"Dark Corners"	2:56
54.	"Constellations"	2:20
55.	"Internal Logic"	3:34
56.	"Picture Frame"	2:35
57.	"An Idea Takes Hold (Demo)"	3:36
58.	"Maybe Another Time"	4:17
59.	"Uncertainty Strikes"	2:05
60.	"Reasons to Continue"	5:17
61.	"The Organ Grinder's Monkey (Demo)"	5:41
62.	"Look At What We Did (Demo)"	3:41
63.	"M.G.M. (Demo)"	2:55
64.	"A Fool's Paradise (Demo)"	3:54
65.	"How It Could Have Been (Version 1)"	1:47
66.	"Enter Menace (Demo)"	5:21
67.	"Welcome to Victorville (Demo)"	1:57
68.	"It Can Get Cold at Night"	4:22
69.	"Marion's Exit (Demo)"	3:47
70.	"A Rare Bird (Demo)"	2:14
71.	"What's at Stake (Demo)"	3:51
72.	"You Can Count on Me"	2:34
73.	"A Respectable Bribe (Demo)"	2:23
74.	"Way Back When (Demo)"	1:59
75.	"Possibilities"	2:31
76.	"I Never Thought It Would Be You"	3:15
77.	"Scenes From Election Night (Demo)"	3:31
78.	"In Your Arms Again (Demo)"	1:07
79.	"An Act of Purging Violence (Demo)"	2:22
80.	"First Dictation (Demo)"	1:55
81.	"Glassy Eyes"	5:44
82.	"Election Night-mare (Demo)"	3:10
83.	"How It Could Have Been (Version 2)"	1:51
84.	"Shoot-out (Demo)"	4:05
85.	"Glendale Station (Demo)"	4:39
86.	"About Something (Demo)"	6:56
87.	"All This Time (Piano demo)"	4:44
Total length:		3:31:15

== Reception ==
Allie Gemmill of Collider said that: "The rich, warm, brassy sounds that score the story as we follow Mankiewicz through a decade's worth of professional and personal highs, lows, and revelations only enriches the viewing experience". Critic Jonathan Broxton stated: "The score works in the film and succeeds admirably as a standalone experience [...] It's compositionally interesting and intellectually stimulating, dramatically apt, thoroughly enjoyable from a purely musical point of view, and shows a rich new side to their musical personality that continues to evolve over time." Firstpost-based critic Lakshmi Govindarajan Javeri called the score album as "one of the refreshing soundtrack of the lockdown year", further adding that "Reznor and Ross have captured an entire bygone era in 52 tracks and have certainly left us with the impression of having lived at the time". Indulge-based Benjamin Milton said "The soundtrack is perfect, at times it even sounds like it may have been written and recorded in the nineteen-thirties." Filmtracks.com wrote "The quality of the score simply cannot support either length of time, but not because of the big band and foxtrot portions. Sprinkled extensively into the first two-thirds of the score and featuring the straight big band performances far more often, these passages are quite admirable in their variety and authenticity. If assembled into their own lengthy suite of cues, they'd be a compelling tribute to the style of the era."

== Chart performance ==
Chart (2010)	Peak position
US Soundtrack Albums (Billboard)	30

== Accolades ==
Award	Date of ceremony	Category	Recipient(s)	Result	Ref.
Academy Awards	April 25, 2021	Best Original Score	Trent Reznor and Atticus Ross	Nominated	
British Academy Film Awards	April 11, 2021	Best Original Music	Trent Reznor and Atticus Ross	Nominated	
Chicago Film Critics Awards	December 21, 2020	Best Original Score	Trent Reznor and Atticus Ross	Nominated	
Critics' Choice Awards	March 7, 2021	Best Score	Trent Reznor and Atticus Ross	Nominated	
Golden Globe Awards	February 28, 2021	Best Original Score – Motion Picture	Trent Reznor and Atticus Ross	Nominated	
Hollywood Critics Association Awards	March 5, 2021	Best Score	Trent Reznor and Atticus Ross	Nominated	
Hollywood Music in Media Awards	January 27, 2021	Best Original Score in a Feature Film	Trent Reznor and Atticus Ross	Nominated	
Satellite Awards	February 15, 2021	Best Original Score	Trent Reznor and Atticus Ross	Nominated	
Saturn Awards	October 26, 2021	Best Music	Trent Reznor and Atticus Ross	Nominated	
