= The Vietnam War (score) =

Soundtrack album by Trent Reznor and Atticus Ross
- Released: September 15, 2017
- Genre: Ambient; electronic
- Length: 95:25
- Label: The Null Corporation
- Producer: Trent Reznor; Atticus Ross

Trent Reznor and Atticus Ross chronology
Patriots Day (2017)	The Vietnam War (2017)	Mid90s (2018)

The Vietnam War (Original Score) is an electronic soundtrack album by Trent Reznor and Atticus Ross for Ken Burns and Lynn Novick's television documentary series The Vietnam War which first aired on PBS in September 2017. The album was released on vinyl, CD and digitally on September 15, 2017 by Universal Music Enterprises and Reznor's own label The Null Corporation.

Additionally, the TV series reused tracks from The Social Network (2010), The Girl with the Dragon Tattoo (2011), together with snippets of ten tracks from Nine Inch Nails' 2008 album Ghosts I–IV and instrumental versions of "The Wretched" from 1999's The Fragile and "The Beginning of the End" from 2007's Year Zero.

Separately, music for the series was also composed by Yo-Yo Ma and the Silk Road Ensemble, David Cieri and Doug Wamble. Ma's work, which served as a score for the Vietnam scenes in the documentary, was released on October 6, 2017 as The Vietnam War by In A Circle Records. A third soundtrack album was released by Universal Music Enterprises, a double disc compilation of 38 (of the over 120) pieces of popular music from the 1960s and 1970s played in the series, The Vietnam War (The Soundtrack).

Professional ratings
Review scores
Source	Rating
AllMusic	3.5/5 stars

== Track listing ==
All tracks are written by Trent Reznor and Atticus Ross

Disc 1
No.	Title	Length
1.	"Less Likely"	6:21
2.	"Four Enclosed Walls"	5:34
3.	"The Forever Rain"	5:01
4.	"Remnants"	4:58
5.	"Other Ways to Get to the Same Place"	8:07
6.	"Torn Polaroid"	5:16
7.	"Before Dawn"	2:45
8.	"What Comes Back"	7:36
9.	"Justified Response"	3:50
10.	"Counting Ticks"	5:28
Total length:		54:56

Disc 2
No.	Title	Length
11.	"A World Away"	6:13
12.	"The Right Things"	8:52
13.	"Passing the Point"	4:25
14.	"Strangers in Lockstep"	4:57
15.	"Before and After Faith"	6:24
16.	"The Same Dream"	4:17
17.	"Haunted"	5:21
Total length:		40:29
