= Rashayla Marie Brown =

American artist

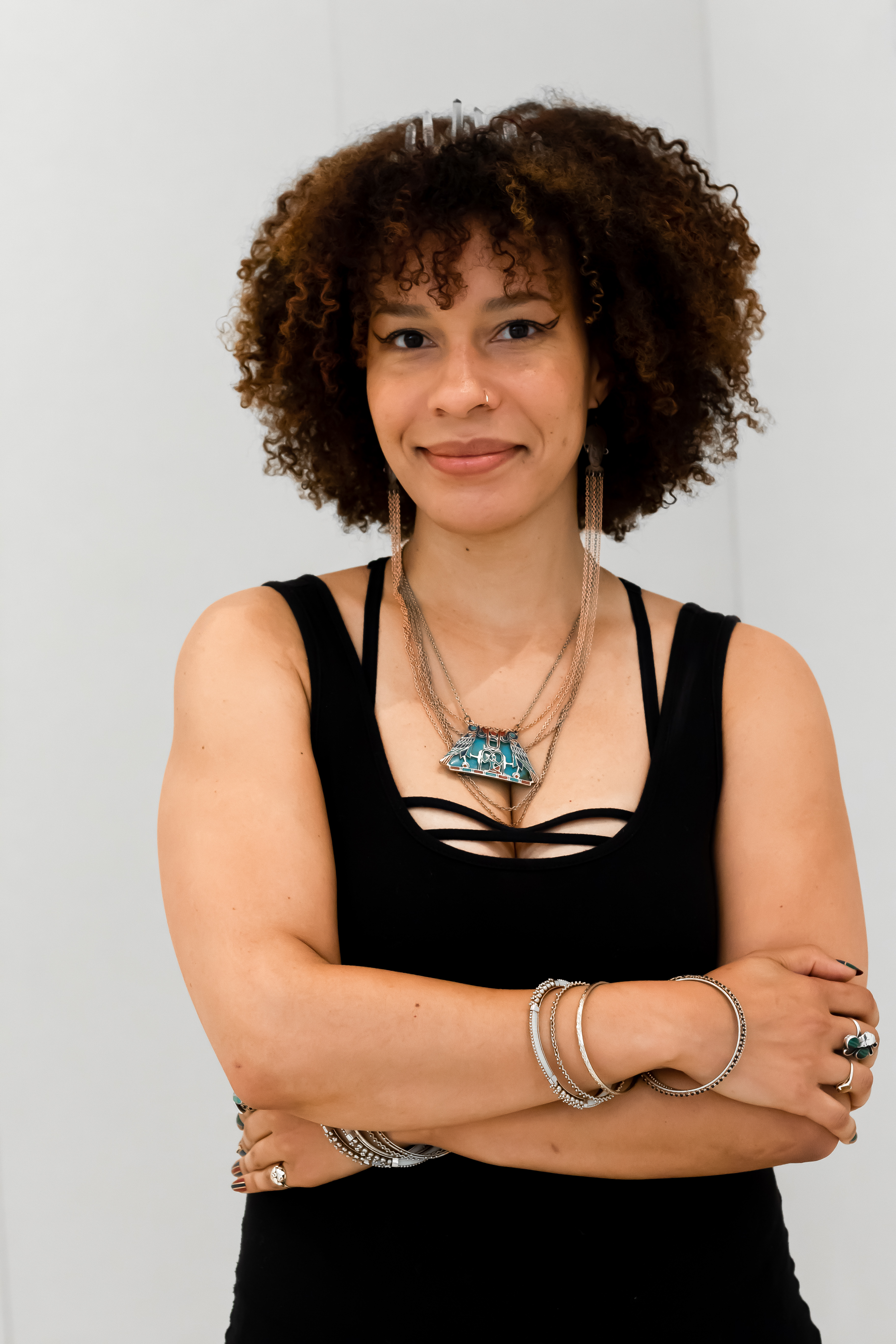
- Born: Toledo, Ohio, United States
- Education: Yale University, BA in African American Studies and Sociology, 2004; Northwestern University, MA in Performance Studies and PhD,

Rashayla Marie Brown is an American artist known for her work on Black feminism, spirituality, and the history of photography.

She received the Chicago Artadia Award in 2017.

== Early life and education ==
Brown was born in 1982 in Toledo, Ohio. In 2004, she earned a Bachelor of Arts degree in African American studies and sociology from Yale University. In 2015, she obtained a Bachelor of Fine Arts (BFA) from the School of the Art Institute of Chicago. Two years later, she received a Master of Arts in performance studies from Northwestern University, where she subsequently pursued a Ph.D. in performance studies.

== Career ==
Brown began her career as an artist in London, England, initially working as a radio DJ and poet. She founded the graphic design firm Selah Vibe, Inc. in Atlanta, Georgia, which is no longer active. She later served as the inaugural director of diversity and inclusion at the School of the Art Institute of Chicago (SAIC) and oversaw RMB Properties, a program focused on providing affordable housing solutions for traveling artists.

== Notable exhibitions ==
Brown presented a solo exhibition of "Single Black Femme" at Royal Academy in London and "The Moving Picture Association for Maintaining Personal Ambivalence" at Recess in Brooklyn. In 2022, her work "Reality Is Not Good Enough NY Premiere" was presented at Metrograph in New York, and "Tamara's Repair: A Moving Image" was included in the Southern Survey Biennial at Project Row Houses in Houston.

== Grants and fellowships ==
- Lucas Artists Fellow
- Artadia and Franklin Furnace grantee
- City of Chicago's Artist Residency
- Hyde Park Art Center Flex Residency
- Roger Brown Residency
- Yale Mellon Research Grant
- Anna Louise Raymond Fellowship
- Chicago Artist Coalition's BOLT Residency
- Propeller Fund
- Yale Mellon Research Grant
- residency support by the Republic and Canton of Geneva
