= Amethyst Rock Star =

Studio album by Saul Williams
- Released: May 8, 2001
- Genre: Alternative hip-hop
- Length: 58:26
- Label: American Recordings
- Producers: Rick Rubin, Musa Bailey, Krust, Saul Williams

Saul Williams chronology
Amethyst Rock Star (2001)	Not in My Name (2003)

Amethyst Rock Star is the debut solo studio album by Saul Williams. It was released by American Recordings in 2001. It peaked at number 135 on the French Albums Chart.

== Critical reception ==
Professional ratings
Review scores
Source	Rating
AllMusic	1.5/5 stars
Robert Christgau	(choice cut)
Drowned in Sound	9/10
Entertainment Weekly	B+
NME	3.5/5 stars
Pitchfork	8.1/10
RapReviews.com	8/10

Steve Kurutz of AllMusic gave the album 1.5 stars out of 5, saying: "Some of the language is downright laughable (see the trite themes of 'Fearless' for example) in any context, and the rest is mediocre at best." Kitty Empire of NME gave the album 3.5 stars out of 5, calling it "an ambitious collision of rock, hip-hop and spoken word, all united by a refusal to conform to the conventions of any of them."

== Track listing ==
All tracks are written by Saul Williams, except where noted.

No.	Title	Writer(s)	Length
1.	"Lalala"		2:40
2.	"Penny for a Thought"	Williams, Musa Bailey	4:34
3.	"Robeson"		4:21
4.	"Tao of Now"	Williams, Musa Bailey	4:19
5.	"Fearless"	Williams, Thom Bahler	3:12
6.	"Untimely Meditations"	Williams, Jerome Jordan, Maximina Juson	3:55
7.	"Om Nia Merican"		3:06
8.	"1987"		5:21
9.	"Coded Language"	Williams, Krust	8:48
10.	"Our Father"		7:06
11.	"Wine / Do You Know (hidden track)"		11:04

Japanese edition bonus track
No.	Title	Length
12.	"Brown Bags"	3:16

== Personnel ==
Credits adapted from liner notes.

Musicians

- Saul Williams – vocals, co–production, arrangement
- Rick Rubin – production
- Musa Bailey – additional production (2), additional programming, turntables
- Krust – additional production (9)
- Esthero – vocals (4)
- Chad Smith – drums (7)
- Jerome Jordan – guitar, backing vocals
- Maximina Juson – bass guitar
- Maryam Blacksher – viola
- Nioka Workman – cello
- Kwame Brandt-Pierce – keyboards
- Chris Eddleton – drums
- Greg Gordon – recording
- Russell Elevado – recording, mixing

Technical personnel

- Marcia Jones – visual art
- Michael Crivello – visual art
- Brandy Flower – graphic design
- Michele Miller – photography
- B+ – photography
- Mei Lei – journals
- Dorothy E. Wilcox – penpal
- Lindsay Chase – coordination

== Charts ==
Chart	Peak position
French Albums (SNEP)	135
