= Festival Theaterformen =

Coordinates: 52.373°N 9.733°E

Festival Theaterformen is a theatre festival in Germany.
