= Emmanuel Community =

Catholic charismatic lay society (1972–present)

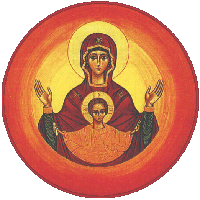
Logo of the Emmanuel Community

The Emmanuel Community is a Catholic association of the faithful of pontifical right, founded in 1972 by Pierre Goursat and Martine Lafitte-Catta, starting from a prayer group belonging to the Catholic charismatic renewal.

== History ==
The Emmanuel Community (Communauté de l’Emmanuel) was founded in Paris, France 1972 by Pierre Goursat and Martine Lafitte-Catta. It developed from a charismatic renewal prayer group. While the numbers of persons participating increased, it was felt that the prayer groups alone did not provide enough in the way of spiritual growth, so weekend retreats and catechism instruction were added. The first collective household formed in 1974 when Goursat formed a shared-living arrangement with two like-minded individuals and found that community living could be an aid to spirituality. In June 1977, leaders of the prayer groups invited members to join a committed community life of prayer and service. About fifty people responded.

It has been called "one of the most dynamic French ecclesial movements". Its success can be attributed, in part, to the support of some of the French bishops in the late 1970s, who welcomed it as an alternative to far-left movements in the French Catholic community at the time.

In 1986, Jean-Marie Lustiger, Archbishop of Paris, granted the group recognition as a Private Association of the Faithful, in the Archdiocese of Paris.

In 2017, the Congregation for the Clergy erected the Clerical Association of the Emmanuel Community for priests and deacons.

== Organization ==
The Emmanuel Community is headquartered in Paris. Internationally, the community is led by a general moderator, helped by an international council, both elected for a three-year mandate. Its members are from all walks of life. According to its statutes, the community strives for an approach that is both contemplative and apostolic. As of 2021, it has around 11,500 members in 67 countries on 5 continents, about half of whom live in France. The members include 270 priests, about 100 seminarians and 200 people, both males and females, living in consecrated celibacy.

== Activities ==
The Emmanuel Community publishes the periodical Il Est vivant. It has been entrusted with the task of animating various pilgrimage sites such as Paray-le-Monial and L'Île-Bouchard in France, Altötting in Germany and so on. Once bishops entrust a parish to a priest belonging to the Emmanuel Community, the members in the vicinity are themselves entrusted with animating and helping parish activities. The Community operates international, 9-month formation programs called Mission Schools in Paray-le-Monial, France, Rome, Italy, Altötting, Germany, and Manila, Philippines, as well as evangelization evening schools in various locations around the world.

The Emmanuel Community in Lecce operates as a non-profit organization that works with individuals and families in difficulty. The Organization also runs a treatment centre for drug addiction.

== Fidesco ==
Founded in 1981 by the Emmanuel Community following a meeting in the Vatican with African bishops, Fidesco is an NGO for international solidarity which sends volunteers to countries in the South to put their professional skills at the service of development projects, to help local populations or humanitarian actions.

Volunteers who leave with Fidesco are singles, couples or families, young people, adults or retired, wishing in the name of their faith to work for the marginalized: this explains the name of FIDES - CO : faith and co-operation.

== See also ==
- Catholic Church in France
- History of the Catholic Church in France
- Catholic mission
- Michael Lonsdale

== Bibliography ==
- Fire and hope : Pierre Goursat, founder of the Emmanuel Community (translated by Michelle K. Borras). Paris : éditions de l'Emmanuel, 2005. 216 pp.-16 pp. de pl., 24 cm. ISBN 2-915313-40-7.
- "A Zenit Daily Dispatch: Emmanuel Community". EWTN.
- Brendan Leahy (2011). Ecclesial Movements and Communities: Origins, Significance, and Issues. New City Press. ISBN 978-1-565483-96-5.
