= Saul Williams =

American singer, poet, actor (born 1972)

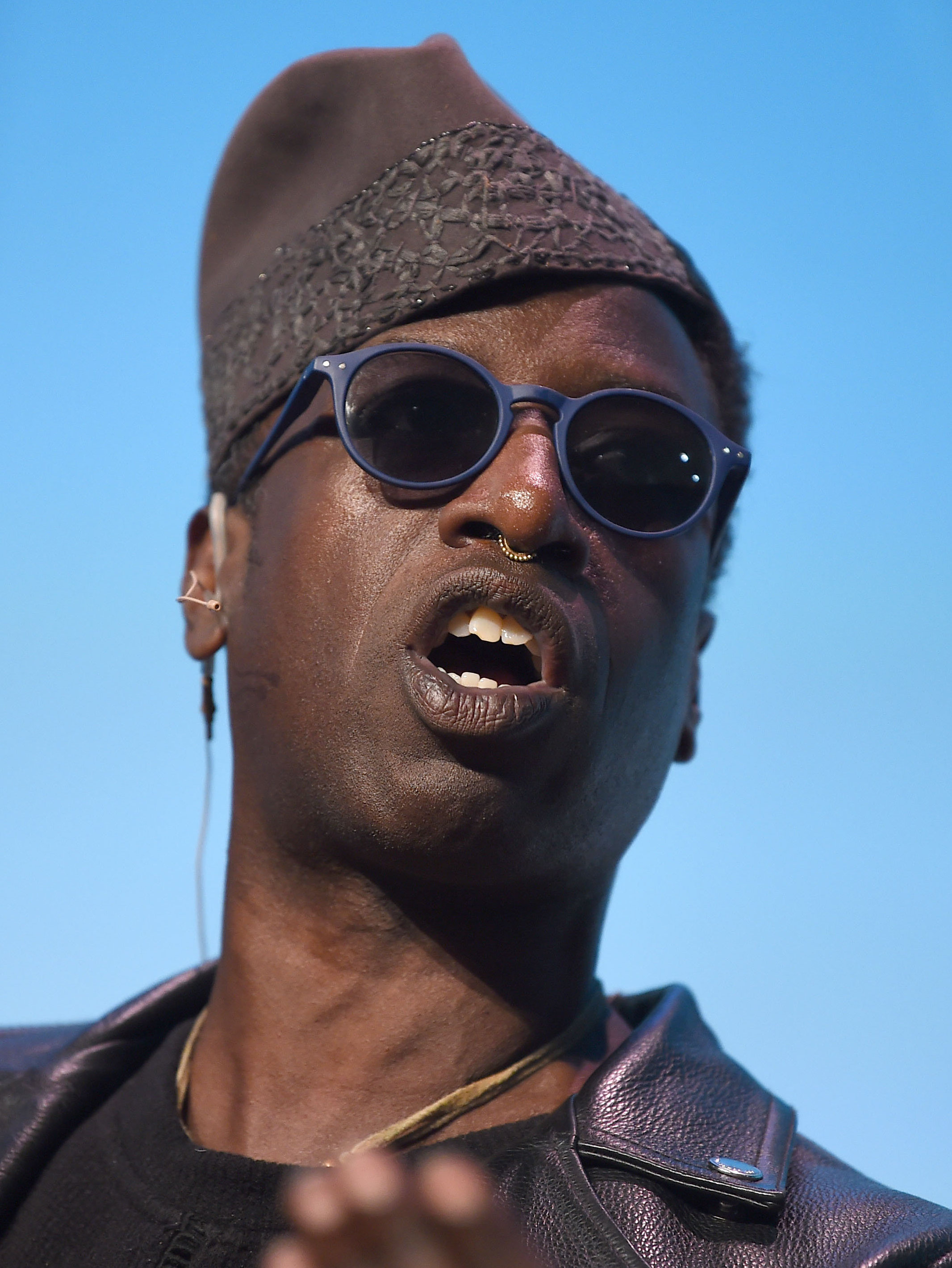
- Williams in 2018

Background information
- Born: Saul Stacey Williams; February 29, 1972 (age 54); Newburgh, New York, U.S.
- Education: Morehouse College (BA); New York University (MFA)
- Genres: Hip-hop; alternative hip-hop; experimental hip-hop; industrial hip-hop; spoken word; poetry
- Occupations: Rapper; singer; songwriter; musician; poet; writer; actor
- Instruments: Vocals; bass guitar; guitar; keyboards; percussion
- Labels: American; Fader Label; Wichita; Big Dada
- Spouses: Anisia Uzeyman (after 2008); Persia White (m. 2008, divorced)
- Website: saulwilliams.com

Saul Stacey Williams (born February 29, 1972) is an American rapper, singer, songwriter, musician, poet, writer, and actor. He is known for his blend of poetry and alternative hip-hop, and for his lead roles in the 1998 independent film Slam and the 2013 jukebox musical Holler If Ya Hear Me. His album Saul Williams Meets Carlos Niño & Friends At Treepeople was nominated in the Best Spoken Word Poetry Album category at the 68th Annual Grammy Awards.

== Early life and education ==
Saul Stacey Williams was born in Newburgh, New York, on February 29, 1972, the youngest of three children. He attended Newburgh Free Academy, where he wrote his song "Black Stacey". He graduated from Morehouse College with a BA in acting and philosophy, then moved to New York City, where he earned an MFA in acting from New York University's Graduate Acting Program at the Tisch School of the Arts. While at New York University, he became part of the New York café poetry scene. He also lived in Brazil as an exchange student from 1988 to 1989.

== Career ==
=== Poetry ===
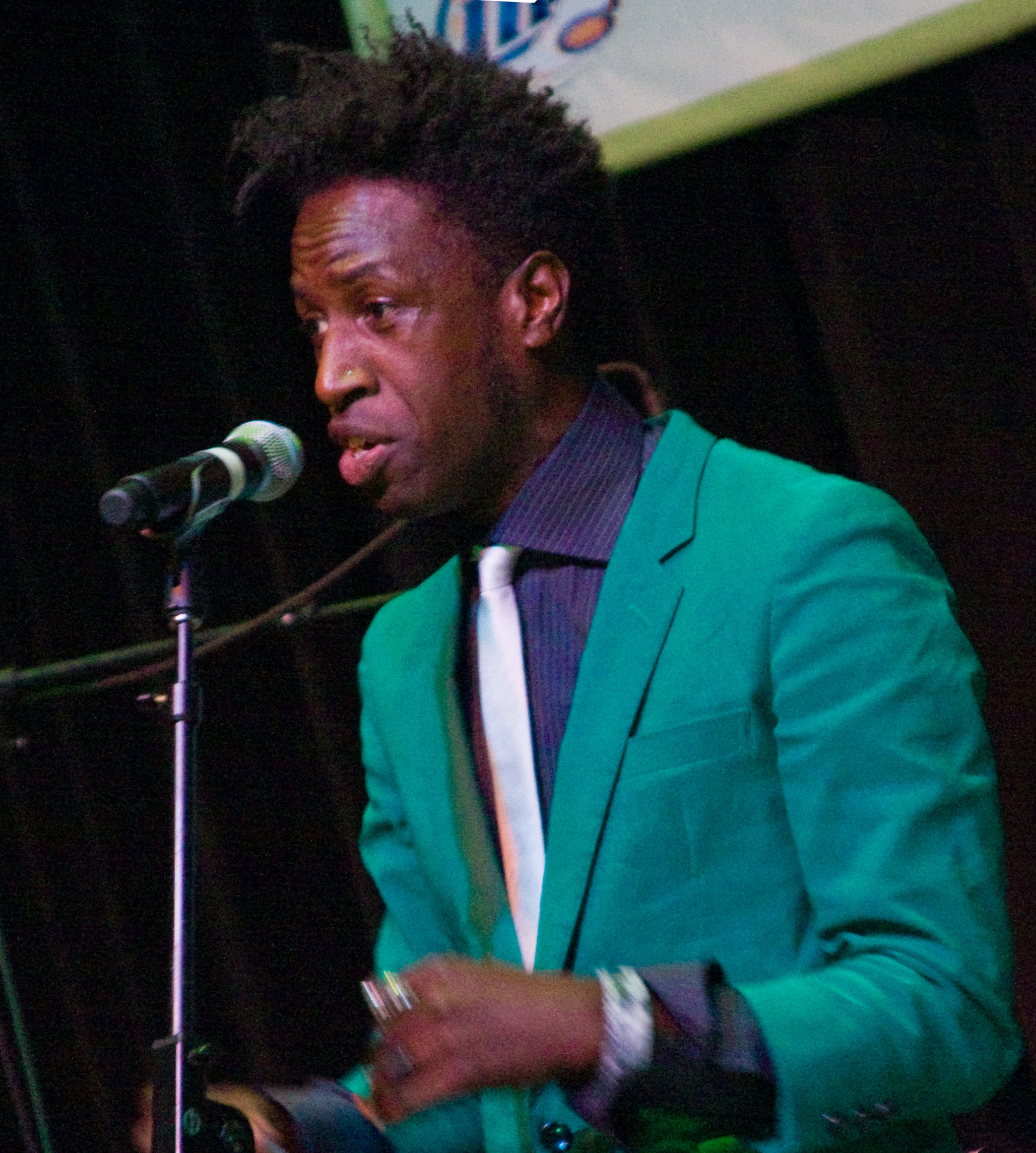
Williams live at SXSW 2008

By 1995, Williams had become an open mic poet. In 1996, he won the title of Nuyorican Poets Cafe's Grand Slam Champion. The documentary film SlamNation follows Williams and the other members of the 1996 Nuyorican Poets Slam team (Beau Sia, muMs da Schemer, and Jessica Care Moore) as they compete in the 1996 National Poetry Slam held in Portland, Oregon. The following year, Williams landed the lead role in the 1998 feature film Slam. Williams featured as both a writer and actor in the film, which would win both the Sundance Festival Grand Jury Prize and the Cannes Camera D'Or (Golden Camera).

=== Music ===
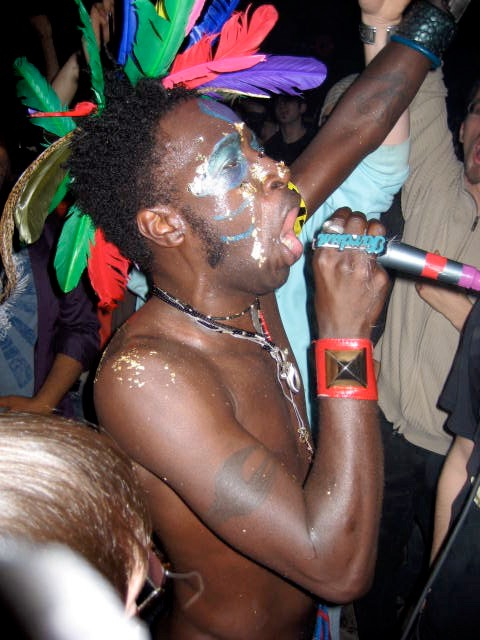
NiggyTardust! tour, Montreal (2008)

Around 1998, Williams was also breaking into music. He had performed with such artists as Nas, The Fugees, Blackalicious, Erykah Badu, KRS-One, Zack De La Rocha, De La Soul, Buckethead, and DJ Krust, as well as poets Allen Ginsberg and Sonia Sanchez. After releasing a string of EPs, he released the LP Amethyst Rock Star with producer Rick Rubin in 2001. In September 2004, he released his self-titled album to much acclaim. He played several shows supporting Nine Inch Nails on their European tour in summer 2005, and has also supported The Mars Volta. Williams was invited to the Lollapalooza music festival around that time, and the Chicago stage allowed Williams to attract a wider audience. He appeared on the Nine Inch Nails album Year Zero, and supported the group on their 2006 tour of North America. On the tour, Williams announced that Trent Reznor would co-produce his next album.

This collaboration resulted in 2007's The Inevitable Rise and Liberation of NiggyTardust!. The album was available only from its website until a physical CD was issued, featuring new tracks and extended album artwork. The first 100,000 customers on the website had the option to download a free lower-quality audio version of the album. The other option was for users to pay $5 to support the artist directly and be given the choice of downloading the higher-quality MP3 version or the lossless FLAC version. The material was produced by Trent Reznor and mixed by Alan Moulder. It was Reznor who said, after his own recent dealings with record labels, that they should release it independently and directly to the audience.

In early 2008, a Nike Sparq Training commercial featured Williams' song "List of Demands (Reparations)". In a November 2008 interview with Wired.com, Williams talked about his forthcoming projects: "There's one album that I'm waist-deep into. I'm aiming to finish it up next month. Trent wants to work on a sequel for Niggy that I think would be cool, and I also have an album and new songs demoed at home that I'm ready to go into the studio and lay down. It’s a complete reflection of how I feel in this country; it's a very transformative time."

Williams' fourth album, Volcanic Sunlight, was released on November 11, 2011. Williams showcased the album at London's Hoxton Bar Kitchen on January 26, 2011. Livemusic interviewed Williams on the evening and made a subsequent film, produced by artist Alex Templeton-Ward. When Williams was asked what the point of poetry was, he said: "I'm making this up, I have no idea but here we go. I think that it would be to express, to share, to relieve, to explore. For me, poetry offers some what of a cathartic experience. I am able to move through emotions and emotional experience particularly, you know, break-ups, difficulties in all the things that I may face, whether that is with an industry or a loved one or whomever, there needs to be an infiltration process, like you have a window open over there. That is the purpose of poetry: it is the window that opens, that allows some air in, some other insight, some other possibility so we can explore all that we feel, all that we think but with the space to see more than what we know, because there is so much more than we know. If I didn't open myself to the possibilities of the unknown, then I would be lost."

Williams' fifth album, MartyrLoserKing, was released on January 29, 2016. The first single released from the album was "Burundi", a collaboration with Emily Kokal of Warpaint.

In March 2018, The Kills released their cover of Williams' "List of Demands (Reparations)" and Williams opened for The Kills' sold-out performance at the Regent Theater in Los Angeles on August 13, 2018.

In June 2026, Williams released "Conspiracy" as the lead single for his album Leap Life. The album is scheduled to release on August 28, 2026.

=== Writing ===
As a writer, Williams has been published in The New York Times, Esquire, Bomb Magazine, and African Voices, as well as releasing four collections of poetry. As a poet and musician, Williams has toured and lectured across the world, appearing at many universities and colleges. In his interview in the book Words in Your Face: A Guided Tour Through Twenty Years of the New York City Poetry Slam, Williams explained why he creates within so many genres: "It's not that I balance those arts out, all the different arts balance me out. So, that there is a certain type of emotion that is more easily accessible through music than poetry... some things are meant to be written, some are meant to be sung, some things are meant to be hummed, some things are made to be yelled, and so that's just how life works."

In January 2009, he released NGH WHT – The Dead Emcee Scrolls with The Arditti Quartet, a reading of his 2006 poetry book of the same name. This collaboration with Thomas Kessler (who also set Williams' spoken-word track, "said the shotgun to the head" to music) was released with two payment options: listeners could download chapters 18 to 22 of the 27-minute composition in MP3 format for free, or could download the entire 33-chapter composition in lossless AIFF format for $6, along with the isolated vocal and quartet multitracks. The entire paid download totalled in size at 563 megabytes. Williams contributed to two tracks on the 2011 album Baba Love by Arthur H.

=== Acting ===
Williams starred in Slam (1998) and Today (2012). On stage, he was chosen for the lead role in Holler If Ya Hear Me, a Broadway musical featuring music by Tupac Shakur. Though it features Shakur's music, the musical is not about his life. It is an original script written by Todd Kreidler. Rolling Stone described the production as "the first hip-hop jukebox musical in Broadway history". The show opened on June 19, 2014. Williams' role in the musical landed him an interview on The Colbert Report, where he spoke about his career and performed a poem entitled "Amethyst Rocks".

He received a Canadian Screen Award nomination for Best Actor at the 9th Canadian Screen Awards in 2021, for his performance in the film Akilla's Escape.

In 2025 he had a role as a preacher in Ryan Coogler's horror film Sinners.

=== Directing ===
In 2021, Neptune Frost, which Williams wrote and co-directed with Anisia Uzeyman, premiered in Cannes at Directors' Fortnight. The film was supported by a successful Kickstarter campaign in 2018.

== Personal life ==
Williams is a vegan. He is a vocal critic of the war on terrorism and the wars in Iraq and Afghanistan. Among his better-known works are the anti-war anthems "Not in My Name" and "Act III Scene 2 (Shakespeare)". In 2011, he added his name to Occupy Musicians, supporting the worldwide Occupy movement against income inequality. He identifies as queer.

Williams and Marcia Jones, a visual artist and art professor, began a relationship in 1995 as collaborative artists on the Brooklyn performance art and spoken word poetry circuit. A collection of poems by Williams entitled S/HE is a series of reflections on the demise of his relationship with Jones. Jones created the cover artwork for The Seventh Octave, images throughout S/HE in response to Williams, and set-designed his 2001 album Amethyst Rock Star.

Williams has a son with choreographer Fatima Robinson.

On February 29, 2008 (his 36th birthday), Williams married actress Persia White after a five-year relationship. They met when he made a guest appearance on the series Girlfriends. On January 17, 2009, White announced via her Myspace blog that she and Williams were no longer together.

He is married to actress Anisia Uzeyman. He lived in Paris for four years but now resides in Los Angeles.

Williams' great grandmother immigrated through Ellis Island from Haiti in 1917.

== Discography ==
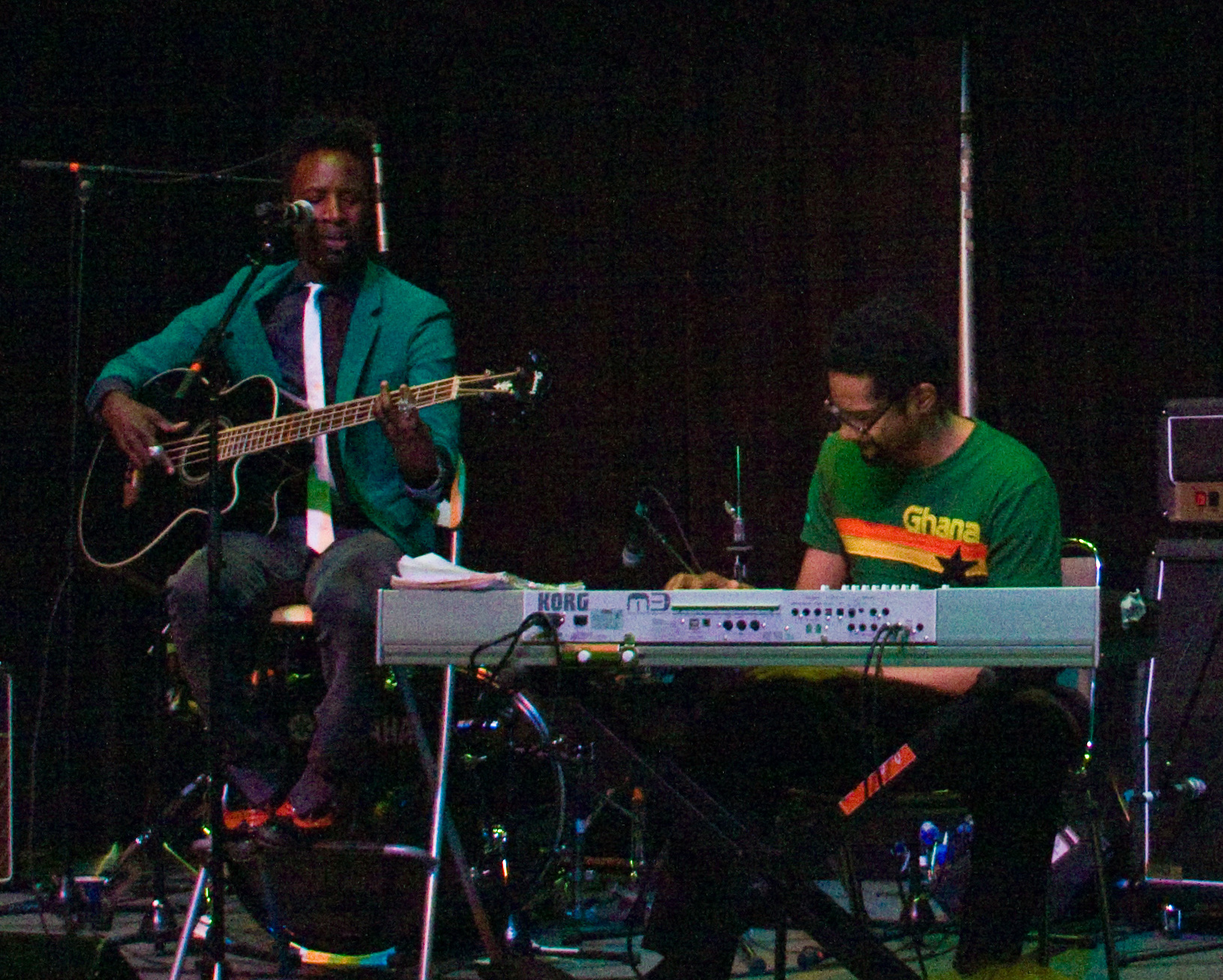
Williams playing the bass at SXSW 2008

=== Studio albums ===
- Amethyst Rock Star (2001)
- Saul Williams (2004)
- The Inevitable Rise and Liberation of NiggyTardust! (2007)
- NGH WHT (2009) (with Arditti Quartet)
- Volcanic Sunlight (2011)
- MartyrLoserKing (2016)
- Encrypted & Vulnerable (2019)
- Unanimous Goldmine (The Original Soundtrack of Neptune Frost) (2022)
- Leap Life (2026)

=== Compilation albums ===
- Real Niggery Volume One (2005)
- These Mthrfckrs: MartyrLoserKing - Remixes, B-Sides, & Demos (2016)

=== EPs ===
- Not in My Name (2003)

=== Singles ===
- "Elohim (1972)" (1998)
- "Penny for a Thought" b/w "Purple Pigeons" (2000)
- "List of Demands (Reparations)" (2004)
- "Black Stacey" (2005)
- "The Flaw You Worship" (2018)

=== Guest appearances ===
List of guest appearances
Title	Year	Other performer(s)	Album
"Coded Language"	1999	Krust	Coded Language
"Monkey Theme"	2000	The Infesticons	Gun Hill Road
"Release"	2002	Blackalicious, Zack de la Rocha, Lyrics Born, Sela Kerr	Blazing Arrow
"Playing House"	2002	Tre Hardson	Liberation
"Sent from Sandy Shores"	2003	Adventure Time	Dreams of Water Themes
"Time (Jungle)" (Temple of Soul Mix)	2003	Wax Poetic	Nublu Sessions
"Freedom"	2004	Karl Denson's Tiny Universe	—N/a
"Three Fingers"	2005	Buckethead & Friends	Enter the Chicken
"Sea Lion" (Extended version)	2005	Sage Francis, Will Oldham, Alias	—N/a
"Lyrical Gunplay"	2006	Thavius Beck	Thru
"Mr. Nichols"	2006	Coldcut	Sound Mirrors
"April Showers, April Tears"	2006	Stuart Davis	—N/a
"Said the Shotgun to the Head"	2006	Thomas Kessler	Thomas Kessler
"Survivalism" (backing vocals)	2007	Nine Inch Nails	Year Zero
"Me, I'm Not" (backing vocals)	2007	Nine Inch Nails	Year Zero
"Gunshots by Computer"	2007	Nine Inch Nails	Year Zero Remixed
"Survivalism"	2007	Nine Inch Nails	Year Zero Remixed
"Easter"	2009	Stuart Davis	Sex, God, Rock 'n Roll: Songs from the TV Series
"U Can Do It"	2010	Maeckes	Kids
"Dance or Die"	2010	Janelle Monáe	The ArchAndroid
"Black Intro"	2010	Vic Mensa	Straight Up
"Le Paradis II Est Chinois"	2011	Arthur H	Baba Love
"Basquiat"	2011	Arthur H	Baba Love
"Believe"	2011	Ayọ	Billie-Eve
"Rendez-Nous L'Argent"	2014	Nevche	Rétroviseur
"Money God"	2015	Haleek Maul	Prince Midas
"Imperial Sound"	2016	Torae	Entitled
"The Virus"	2016	A Tribe Called Red, Chippewa Travellers	We Are the Halluci Nation
"Wings"	2017	Vic Mensa, Pharrell Williams	The Autobiography
"Faster"	2017	Rone	Mirapolis
"Ancestral Recall"	2019	Christian Scott	Ancestral Recall
"Mental"	2022	Denzel Curry, Bridget Perez	Melt My Eyez See Your Future
"The Entrance"	2022	Niariu	Story of a Sad Mermaid
"Under Rats"	2025	Deerhoof	Noble and Godlike in Ruin

== Bibliography ==
- The Seventh Octave, 1998, Moore Black Press, ISBN 0-9658308-1-0
- She, 1999, MTV/Pocketbooks, ISBN 0-671-03977-6
- Said the Shotgun to the Head, 2003, MTV/Pocketbooks, ISBN 0-7434-7079-6
- The Dead Emcee Scrolls, 2006, MTV/Pocketbooks, ISBN 1-4165-1632-8
- Chorus, 2012, MTV Books, ISBN 978-1-4516-4983-3
- US (a.), 2015, Gallery Books/MTV Books, ISBN 9781476779324
- Martyr Loser King: A Graphic Novel (art by Morgan Sorne), 2026, 23rd Street Books, ISBN 978-1626721999
- Songs My Mother Taught Me: Why the Artist Must Take Sides, 2026, Haymarket Books, ISBN 979-8888905852

== Filmography ==
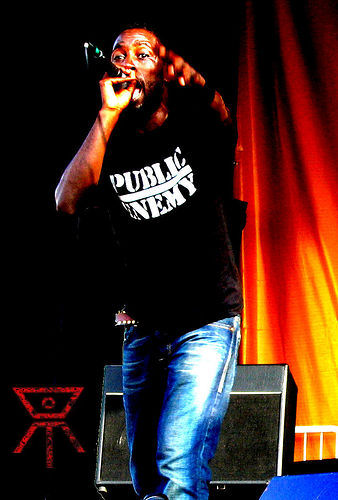
Williams in 2005

=== Film ===
- Underground Voices (1996)
- Slam (1998)
- SlamNation (1998)
- I'll Make Me a World (1999)
- Downtown 81 (voice) (2000)
- King of the Korner (2000)
- K-PAX (2001)
- The N-Word (2004)
- Lackawanna Blues (2005)
- Today (2012)
- A Midsummer Night's Dream (2017)
- Akilla's Escape (2020)
- Neptune Frost (2021)
- Blink Twice (2024)
- Sinners (2025)

=== Television ===
- Girlfriends (2003)
- The Colbert Report (2014)
