= Killers of the Flower Moon (soundtrack) =

2023 soundtrack album by Robbie Robertson

Killers of the Flower Moon (Soundtrack from the Apple Original Film)

Soundtrack album by Robbie Robertson
- Released: October 20, 2023
- Genres: Blues rock; country blues; country rock; folk rock; film score; Native American
- Length: 53:11
- Label: Sony Masterworks
- Producer: Robbie Robertson

Killers of the Flower Moon (Soundtrack from the Apple Original Film) is the soundtrack album composed by Robbie Robertson for the 2023 film Killers of the Flower Moon by Martin Scorsese. It was Robertson's final completed film score before he died in August 2023; the film is dedicated to his memory. For his score, Robertson was posthumously nominated for Best Original Score at the 96th Academy Awards.

== Background ==
Composer Robbie Robertson himself was of First Nations descent; his mother had Cayuga and Mohawk ancestry and was raised on the Six Nations of the Grand River reserve in Ontario. Although Robertson did not want to compose "any stereotypical Indian music" for the soundtrack, his heritage and experiences helped him incorporate tribal elements into the blues rock sound of the album.

I was gathering pictures in my head of music I heard as a child at the Six Nations Indian Reserve. My relatives are all sitting around with their instruments, and one guy would start a rhythm, and then somebody would start singing a melody to that, and it was just haunting. The feeling of the music beside you like that, humming and droning—the groove and the feel of it got under my skin and it lives there forever.

— Robbie Robertson

Robertson had a long-standing personal and working relationship with director Martin Scorsese, and had most recently compiled the soundtrack of Scorsese's 2019 film The Irishman. Scorsese had considered Robertson one of his closest friends and confidants.

Regarding Robertson's score, actress Lily Gladstone, who plays Mollie Kyle in the film, stated, "As young Native kids living around the [reservation] with my dad who loved The Band, loved Bob Dylan, loved Martin Scorsese, it was truly an honor to tell the story against [Robertson's] music and his greatness."

== Composition ==
Unable to read or write music, Robertson was initially hesitant to work with orchestrator Mark Graham, who had previously worked with esteemed composers such as John Williams and Alexandre Desplat. Scorsese did not want traditional "movie music" for his score, and Robertson was determined to deliver an extraordinary product. During principal photography, Robertson visited the film set in Oklahoma to meet with Osage musicians and ensure the authenticity of his music.

In July 2021, Robertson began sending Graham brief videos of his ideas for the score, which including him strumming the guitar or singing. Robertson put together an ensemble which included guitars, keyboards, mandolins, cellos, mandocellos, a zither, a manzarene, and a harmonica. The unorthodox band then gathered at Robertson's studio in Los Angeles to record the score.

Sometimes, it's a small build, but this was a really big one. A lot of music was involved with this. I wanted to build an orchestra of guitar sounds with different variations of the instrument. I kept building and building the orchestra and then I tore it down and tried to keep its soul.

— Robbie Robertson

As Scorsese prefers not to edit his films to temp scores, Robertson had completed a first draft of the score by the time filming had wrapped. Despite Robertson's progressing prostate cancer, he was able to complete the score and attend a private album release party before he died in August 2023. Scorsese fondly called Robertson's score "the beating heart of the picture" and "one of the most beautiful scores ever written for a film."

=== "Wahzhazhe (A Song for My People)" ===
The Osage language song "Wahzhazhe (A Song for My People)", used in the final scene of the film, was composed by Osage Nation members Scott George, Kenny Bighorse, and Vann Bighorse. Regarding the song's inclusion in the film, Scorsese stated, "I felt that we should end the film with a special piece of music created by the Osage," and noted that "the music of the Osage is the best display of [their] extraordinary survival."

Scorsese and actors Leonardo DiCaprio and Lily Gladstone had attended the Osage Nation's annual I'n-Lon-Schka dances in June 2021. They were impressed by the energy and movement of the dances, and Scorsese wished to create a similar energy for the film's conclusion. Scorsese contacted Vann Bighorse, who served as a consultant on the film and who, in turn, contacted Scott George and Kenny Bighorse to help him compose a song for the film. The three men decided against using existing traditional music and instead opted to compose a new song. They composed two pieces that they then sent to Scorsese to select from.

Regarding his selected piece, George stated, "It's talking about our people, asking our people to stand up. We know that God has gotten us this far and it's acknowledging that. It's saying Wahzhazhe Ni-ka-zhi: stand up ... the meaning is we're thankful that we're here and we've gone this far." The song was performed by the Osage Tribal Singers, a collective of singers from the Osage Nation's I'n-Lon-Schka drum committees.

"Wahzhazhe (A Song for My People)" was nominated for Best Original Song at the 96th Academy Awards. making George the first ever Osage Nation member to be nominated for an Academy Award. Commenting on the film's Academy Awards nominations, Principal Chief Geoffrey Standing Bear stated, "Osage Nation is especially proud that Osage Composer Scott George, consultants Kenny and Vann Bighorse, and all our tribal singers are receiving this extraordinary recognition for 'Wahzhazhe (A Song For My People)'."

== Critical reception ==
Brian Tallerico of Roger Ebert wrote that "Robbie Robertson's thrumming score is practically a character, giving the film a heartbeat that adds tension to its notable runtime. This story wouldn't have nearly the same momentum with a traditional, classical score. Hamish MacBain of the Evening Standard wrote that Robertson's score was "absolutely fantastic, particularly the recurring, minimal, two note retro-bass motif that effectively ramps up the tension at key points." Moira Macdonald of The Seattle Times called Robertson's score "quietly powerful," while Peter Travers of ABC News called it "haunting" and "a fitting legacy" for Robertson's career.

Tim Greiving of the Los Angeles Times wrote that "Robertson's contribution is an astonishing and lively musical ecosystem that gives immediate authenticity to Scorsese's equally vivid presentation of Osage life and culture in 1920s Oklahoma. It's music that proudly worships and dances with these people — and alternately weeps for their oppression, at times sounding almost sick at their treatment by the story's white predators." He also called the soundtrack "the best music Robertson ever wrote for the screen."

== Live performances ==
On November 15, 2023, Martin Scorsese held a tribute concert for Robertson, which included excerpts from his Killers of the Flower Moon score. Notable guests included Leonardo DiCaprio and Lily Gladstone, who both starred in the film.

== Accolades ==
Killers of the Flower Moon (Soundtrack from the Apple Original Film) awards and nominations
Award	Year (Note: Indicates the year of ceremony. Each year is linked to the article about the awards held that year, wherever possible.)	Category	Recipients	Result	Ref.
Hollywood Music in Media Awards	2023	Best Original Score in a Feature Film	Robbie Robertson (p.r.)	Won	
St. Louis Film Critics Association Awards	2023	Best Score	Robbie Robertson (p.r.)	Runner-up	
Washington D.C. Area Film Critics Association Awards	2023	Best Score	Robbie Robertson (p.r.)	Nominated	
Chicago Film Critics Association Awards	2023	Best Original Score	Robbie Robertson (p.r.)	Won	
Dallas–Fort Worth Film Critics Association Awards	2023	Best Musical Score	Robbie Robertson (p.r.)	Won	
Florida Film Critics Circle Awards	2023	Best Score	Robbie Robertson (p.r.)	Nominated	
Astra Film Awards	2024	Best Score	Robbie Robertson (p.r.)	Nominated	
Golden Globe Awards	2024	Best Original Score	Robbie Robertson (p.r.)	Nominated	
Critics' Choice Movie Awards	2024	Best Score	Robbie Robertson (p.r.)	Nominated	
Online Film Critics Society Awards	2024	Best Original Score	Robbie Robertson (p.r.)	Nominated	
Society of Composers & Lyricists Awards	2024	Outstanding Original Score for a Studio Film	Robbie Robertson (p.r.)	Nominated	
British Academy Film Awards	2024	Best Original Score	Robbie Robertson (p.r.)	Nominated	
Satellite Awards	2024	Best Original Score	Robbie Robertson (p.r.)	Nominated	
Academy Awards	2024	Best Original Score	Robbie Robertson (p.r.)	Nominated	
Academy Awards	2024	Best Original Song	"Wahzhazhe (A Song for My People)" (Scott George)	Nominated	

== Track listing ==
Killers of the Flower Moon (Soundtrack from the Apple Original Film) track listing
No.	Title	Performer(s)	Length
1.	"Intro (The Sacred Pipe)"		0:38
2.	"Osage Oil Boom"		2:51
3.	"My Land...My Land"		2:10
4.	"Heartbeat Theme/ Ni-U-Kon-Ska"		3:33
5.	"They Don't Live Long"		2:55
6.	"The Wedding"		2:04
7.	"Tribal Council"		1:12
8.	"Reign of Terror"		2:51
9.	"Insulin Train"		2:50
10.	"Tulsa Massacre Newsreel"		2:24
11.	"Shame on Us"		2:42
12.	"Too Much Dynamite"		2:56
13.	"Not if it's Illegal"		2:47
14.	"Salvation Adagio"		3:11
15.	"Still Standing"		3:48
16.	"Tupelo Blues"	Rayna Gellert; Kieran Kane; Philip Jamison; David Mansfield	2:53
17.	"Livery Stable Blues"	Vince Giordano; Nighthawks	1:54
18.	"The Gallop, Chasse, Pas de Bouree"	Adam Nielsen	0:37
19.	"Metropolis (A Blue Fantasie)"	Vince Giordano; Nighthawks	2:10
20.	"Mollie"	Andy Stein	0:20
21.	"Wahzhazhe (A Song for My People)"	Osage Tribal Singers	6:25
Total length:			53:11

== Release history ==
Release history and formats for Killers of the Flower Moon (Soundtrack from the Apple Original Film)
Region	Date	Format(s)	Label(s)	Ref.
Various	October 20, 2023	Digital download; streaming	Sony Masterworks	
United States	December 8, 2023	CD	Sony Masterworks	
United States	December 15, 2023	LP	Sony Masterworks	
Japan	December 27, 2023	CD	Sony Music	
