= Satellite Award for Best Original Score =

Annual film music award

- Awarded for: Best Score
- Country: United States
- Presented by: International Press Academy
- First award: 1996
- Currently held by: Ludwig Göransson – Sinners (2025)

The Satellite Award for Best Original Score is an annual award given by the International Press Academy. Hans Zimmer is both the most awarded and the most nominated composer in this category, with five wins and ten nominations.

== Winners and nominees ==
=== 1990s ===
Year	Winners and nominees	Composer(s)
1996	The English Patient	Gabriel Yared
1996	Hamlet	Patrick Doyle
1996	Mars Attacks!	Danny Elfman
1996	Michael Collins	Elliot Goldenthal
1996	Sling Blade	Daniel Lanois
1997	Titanic	James Horner
1997	Amistad	John Williams
1997	Anastasia	David Newman
1997	L.A. Confidential	Jerry Goldsmith
1997	One Night Stand	Mike Figgis
1998	The Thin Red Line	Hans Zimmer
1998	Beloved	Rachel Portman
1998	City of Angels	Gabriel Yared
1998	Pleasantville	Randy Newman
1998	Saving Private Ryan	John Williams
1999	Sleepy Hollow	Danny Elfman
1999	The Legend of 1900	Ennio Morricone
1999	The Red Violin	John Corigliano
1999	Snow Falling on Cedars	James Newton Howard
1999	The Thomas Crown Affair	Bill Conti

=== 2000s ===
Year	Winners and nominees	Composer(s)
2000	Gladiator	Hans Zimmer
2000	The Legend of Bagger Vance	Rachel Portman
2000	Malèna	Ennio Morricone
2000	Proof of Life	Danny Elfman
2000	Traffic	Cliff Martinez
2001	Moulin Rouge!	Craig Armstrong
2001	A Beautiful Mind	James Horner
2001	Hannibal	Hans Zimmer
2001	Legally Blonde	Rolfe Kent
2001	Spy Game	Harry Gregson-Williams
2002	Frida	Elliot Goldenthal
2002	24 Hour Party People	Liz Gallacher
2002	25th Hour	Terence Blanchard
2002	About a Boy	Damon Gough
2002	Roger Dodger	Craig Wedren
2003	The Last Samurai	Hans Zimmer
2003	Camp	Stephen Trask
2003	Cold Mountain	Gabriel Yared
2003	Finding Nemo	Thomas Newman
2003	The Lord of the Rings: The Return of the King	Howard Shore
2003	The Missing	James Horner
2003	Seabiscuit	Randy Newman
2004	Napoleon Dynamite	John Swihart
2004	Alfie	Mick Jagger, John Powell, and David A. Stewart
2004	The Aviator	Howard Shore
2004	Finding Neverland	Jan A. P. Kaczmarek
2004	The Incredibles	Michael Giacchino
2004	Spider-Man 2	Danny Elfman
2005	Kingdom of Heaven	Harry Gregson-Williams
2005	Brokeback Mountain	Gustavo Santaolalla
2005	The Constant Gardener	Alberto Iglesias
2005	Corpse Bride	Danny Elfman
2005	Memoirs of a Geisha	John Williams
2005	Sin City	Robert Rodriguez
2006	Babel	Gustavo Santaolalla
2006	Brick	Nathan Johnson
2006	The Da Vinci Code	Hans Zimmer
2006	Flags of Our Fathers	Clint Eastwood
2006	The Lives of Others	Gabriel Yared
2006	Notes on a Scandal	Philip Glass
2007	The Kite Runner	Alberto Iglesias
2007	The Assassination of Jesse James by the Coward Robert Ford	Nick Cave
2007	Atonement	Dario Marianelli
2007	Eastern Promises	Howard Shore
2007	The Lookout	James Newton Howard
2007	Ratatouille	Michael Giacchino
2008	Slumdog Millionaire	A. R. Rahman
2008	Australia	David Hirschfelder
2008	Horton Hears a Who!	John Powell
2008	Milk	Danny Elfman
2008	Quantum of Solace	David Arnold
2008	WALL-E	Thomas Newman
2009	Up in the Air	Rolfe Kent
2009	Amelia	Gabriel Yared
2009	The Informant!	Marvin Hamlisch
2009	Public Enemies	Elliot Goldenthal
2009	Up	Michael Giacchino
2009	Where the Wild Things Are	Carter Burwell and Karen O

=== 2010s ===
Year	Winners and nominees	Composer(s)
2010	Inception	Hans Zimmer
2010	127 Hours	A. R. Rahman
2010	Black Swan	Clint Mansell
2010	The Eclipse	Fionnuala Ní Chiosáin
2010	Harry Potter and the Deathly Hallows – Part 1	Alexandre Desplat
2010	Salt	James Newton Howard
2010	The Social Network	Trent Reznor and Atticus Ross
2010	The Twilight Saga: Eclipse	Howard Shore
2011	Soul Surfer	Marco Beltrami
2011	Drive	Cliff Martinez
2011	Harry Potter and the Deathly Hallows – Part 2	Alexandre Desplat
2011	Super 8	Michael Giacchino
2011	War Horse	John Williams
2011	Water for Elephants	James Newton Howard
2012	Argo	Alexandre Desplat
2012	Anna Karenina	Dario Marianelli
2012	Beasts of the Southern Wild	Benh Zeitlin and Dan Romer
2012	Lincoln	John Williams
2012	The Master	Jonny Greenwood
2012	Skyfall	Thomas Newman
2013	Gravity	Steven Price
2013	12 Years a Slave	Hans Zimmer
2013	The Book Thief	John Williams
2013	Her	Arcade Fire
2013	Philomena	Alexandre Desplat
2013	The Secret Life of Walter Mitty	Theodore Shapiro
2014	Birdman	Antonio Sánchez
2014	Fury	Steven Price
2014	Gone Girl	Trent Reznor and Atticus Ross
2014	The Imitation Game	Alexandre Desplat
2014	Interstellar	Hans Zimmer
2014	The Judge	Thomas Newman
2015	Carol	Carter Burwell
2015	The Danish Girl	Alexandre Desplat
2015	Inside Out	Michael Giacchino
2015	The Martian	Harry Gregson-Williams
2015	Spectre	Thomas Newman
2015	Spotlight	Howard Shore
2016	La La Land	Justin Hurwitz
2016	The BFG	John Williams
2016	Hacksaw Ridge	Rupert Gregson-Williams
2016	Hidden Figures	Hans Zimmer, Pharrell Williams, and Benjamin Wallfisch
2016	The Jungle Book	John Debney
2016	Manchester by the Sea	Lesley Barber
2017	Wonder Woman	Rupert Gregson-Williams
2017	Darkest Hour	Dario Marianelli
2017	Dunkirk	Hans Zimmer
2017	The Shape of Water	Alexandre Desplat
2017	War for the Planet of the Apes	Michael Giacchino
2017	Wonderstruck	Carter Burwell
2018	First Man	Justin Hurwitz
2018	Colette	Thomas Adès
2018	BlacKkKlansman	Terence Blanchard
2018	If Beale Street Could Talk	Nicholas Britell
2018	The Sisters Brothers	Alexandre Desplat
2018	Widows	Hans Zimmer
2019	Joker	Hildur Guðnadóttir
2019	1917	Thomas Newman
2019	Ford v Ferrari	Marco Beltrami and Buck Sanders
2019	Harriet	Terence Blanchard
2019	The Irishman	Robbie Robertson
2019	Marriage Story	Randy Newman

=== 2020s ===
Year	Film	Recipient(s)
2020	The Midnight Sky	Alexandre Desplat
2020	Mank	Trent Reznor and Atticus Ross
2020	Minari	Emile Mosseri
2020	News of the World	James Newton Howard
2020	One Night in Miami...	Terence Blanchard
2020	Tenet	Ludwig Göransson
2021	Dune	Hans Zimmer
2021	The French Dispatch	Alexandre Desplat
2021	The Harder They Fall	Jeymes Samuel
2021	The Last Duel	Harry Gregson-Williams
2021	Parallel Mothers	Alberto Iglesias
2021	The Power of the Dog	Jonny Greenwood
2021	Spencer	Jonny Greenwood
2022	Babylon	Justin Hurwitz
2022	The Banshees of Inisherin	Carter Burwell
2022	The Fablemans	John Williams
2022	Top Gun: Maverick	Lorne Balfe, Harold Faltermeyer, Lady Gaga, and Hans Zimmer
2022	The Woman King	Terence Blanchard
2022	Women Talking	Hildur Guðnadóttir
2023	American Fiction	Laura Karpman
2023	Killers of the Flower Moon	Robbie Robertson (posthumous)
2023	Oppenheimer	Ludwig Göransson
2023	Poor Things	Jerskin Fendrix
2023	Society of the Snow	Michael Giacchino
2023	Spider-Man: Across the Spider-Verse	Daniel Pemberton
2024	Emilia Pérez	Clément Ducol and Camille
2024	The Room Next Door	Alberto Iglesias
2024	The Brutalist	Daniel Blumberg
2024	Dune: Part Two	Hans Zimmer
2024	The Wild Robot	Kris Bowers
2024	Conclave	Volker Bertelmann
2025	Sinners	Ludwig Göransson
2025	Frankenstein	Alexandre Desplat
2025	F1	Hans Zimmer
2025	One Battle After Another	Jonny Greenwood
2025	Hamnet	Max Richter
2025	A House of Dynamite	Volker Bertelmann
