= Harriet (soundtrack) =

Harriet (Original Motion Picture Soundtrack)

Soundtrack album by Terence Blanchard
- Released: November 1, 2019
- Recorded: 2019
- Studio: The Village, Los Angeles; Reservoir Studios, New York City; Whole Team Winnin' Studios, New York City; Ocean Way Recording Studios, Nashville
- Genre: Film score
- Length: 67:12
- Label: Back Lot Music
- Producer: Terence Blanchard

Terence Blanchard chronology
BlacKkKlansman (2018)	Harriet (2019)	Da 5 Bloods (2020)

Singles from Harriet (Original Motion Picture Soundtrack)
- 1. "Stand Up" Released: October 25, 2019

Harriet (Original Motion Picture Soundtrack) is the soundtrack album to the 2019 film Harriet directed by Kasi Lemmons starring Cynthia Erivo, Leslie Odom Jr., Joe Alwyn and Janelle Monáe. The film score is composed by Terence Blanchard and released through Back Lot Music on November 1, 2019. The song "Stand Up", performed by Erivo, was released as a single a week prior, and received Oscar, Grammy and Golden Globe nominations.

== Development ==
Terence Blanchard composed the film score in his fourth collaboration with Lemmons after Eve's Bayou (1997), The Caveman's Valentine (2001) and Talk to Me (2007). He considered the project he had to work on as Harriet Tubman "was a heroine, and this is one of the few times where we're seeing an action hero female that's not fiction. This is a real person" which led to being attracted towards the film. During their early discussion with Lemmons, Blanchard wanted an orchestra for the "big, sweeping moments" and denied finding instruments that are historically appropriate.

While writing the themes, he wanted the melody to ascend at the beginning as it was supposed to be uplifting, and Blanchard wanted to find harmony which had powerful vocals and did multiple variations as it sounded masculine at a major key, and being dark while trying at a minor key, which Blanchard denied as "it needs to pick people's spirits up, because that's what this woman did". Blanchard wrote themes at piano, playing melodies and harmonies, while also created rhythmic palettes which was not used in a film as it was inappropriate. One of the themes had him use his voice to create a rhythmic voice but denied as it was a male voice and did not work.

Blanchard used a full orchestra while also playing African percussion in the chase sequences and created drum loops by layering 6–7 drum parts. He collaborated with The E-Collective's jazz pianist Fabian Almazan, who played piano with effects for Harriet's visions, suggested by Lemmons who wanted a musical element over sound design, which worked well in the film. The tuning of piano with effects in Almazan's computer gave an electronic feel for the score. Blanchard used several percussions ranging from djembes, doumbeks, congas, toms and other ethnic percussion. Much of the instruments were arranged through the vocals, where much of the sounds came from the brass and strings. In order to avoid overpowering, Blanchard doubled the lower brass with lower strings and utilized French horns to create a haunting effect as it had a distant sound, while bringing trumpets for dramatic portions.

For the scenes that build tensions, Blanchard considered it as the superhero part using the themes they decided for Harriet, as they were "not heavy action music, but music with motion". Blanchard noted the shootout scene which progress towards the action music, and until that sequence, a lot of melodic themes followed. The score accompanied numerous emotional colors, ranging from tragedy and melancholy to beauty and hope, with several aspects ranging from harmony, rhythm, sound and color stemmed during the initial discussions with Lemmons, noted "it's a balancing act between the orchestrations, and the articulations that you write for them, and the dynamics that you write for them".

== Track listing ==
No.	Title	Artist(s)	Length
1.	"Opening"		1:14
2.	"Hold On"	Vondie Curtis-Hall	0:49
3.	"Broken Contract"		1:28
4.	"On the Run"		1:43
5.	"Goodbye Song"	Terence Blanchard; Cynthia Erivo	1:12
6.	"I'll Be with You"		1:30
7.	"Fear Is Your Enemy"		1:40
8.	"Running for the Bridge"		2:08
9.	"Suicide"		1:22
10.	"Back on the Move"		1:40
11.	"Walking into Freedom"		1:20
12.	"Walk Like You Have a Right To"		1:01
13.	"Minty's Story"		2:41
14.	"To Marie's"		0:34
15.	"Harriet Gets Bath"		2:44
16.	"I'm Going Back"		3:04
17.	"I Listen for Your Voice"		1:07
18.	"The Railroad Starts"		4:29
19.	"Bigger Long Meeting"		1:51
20.	"We Go Left"		1:21
21.	"Ye of Little Faith"		2:10
22.	"I Lost Them"		1:33
23.	"Back in Philly"		0:32
24.	"Talking to God"		2:05
25.	"Meeting the Underground"		1:36
26.	"Freeing Rachel"		1:20
27.	"You the One They Call Moses"		1:00
28.	"Gotta Go"		4:14
29.	"Marie's Death"		4:05
30.	"Flash"		1:58
31.	"Sign of the Judgement"	Vondie Curtis-Hall	1:02
32.	"Bigger and Gideon"		2:16
33.	"Our Time Is Near"	Our People Are	1:08
34.	"Harriet Comes Home"		2:12
35.	"Stand Up"	Cynthia Erivo	5:03
Total length:			67:12

== Reception ==
Owen Gleiberman of Variety wrote "the score of "Harriet," written by the jazz composer Terence Blanchard, has a surprisingly standard Jerry Goldsmith-meets-Aaron-Copland blandness that keeps getting in the way of what we're watching." David Rooney of The Hollywood Reporter wrote "Terence Blanchard's lush score swells into soaring uplift mode over a rain-soaked field, aggressively signaling emotional cues before we've encountered a single character." Ann Hornaday of The Washington Post called it "a characteristically gorgeous musical score".

Peter Travers of Rolling Stone called it a "celestial score". Charlotte O'Sullivan of London Evening Standard wrote "Terence Blanchard's score, too, is painfully unsubtle." Robbie Collin of The Daily Telegraph called it an "ever-swelling score". Mark Jenkins of NPR considered Blanchard's score "as earnest and conventional as the movie". Eric Kohn of IndieWire described it as a "euphoric score".

Allan Hunter of Screen International wrote "Terence Blanchard's heavy-handed score doesn't do the film many favours as it constantly pushes scenes towards emotional uplift or emphatically underlines impending danger." Clarisse Loughrey of The Independent wrote "Terence Blanchard's score feels like it was ripped from this era, too. It often intrudes on the drama, announcing every single one of Tubman's heroic acts with the swell of an orchestra." Monica Castillo of TheWrap for "Terence Blanchard's score often hijacks scenes' emotions by wringing every possible note of sentimentality."

== Personnel ==
Credits adapted from liner notes:

- Music composer and producer – Terence Blanchard
- Digital recordist – Jasper LeMaster, Ryan Yount
- Recording – Nick Spezia
- Mixing – Matt Ward, Austin Atwood, Greg Hayes
- Mastering – Reuben Cohen
- Score editor – Josh Ditty
- Music editor – Marvin Morris
- Music coordinator – Robin Burgess
- Copyist – Michael Lloyd, Sammy Sanfilippo
- Package design – Brian Porizek

Orchestra

- Performer – Nashville Music Scoring Orchestra
- Orchestration – Howard Drossin, Terence Blanchard
- Conductor – Terence Blanchard
- Choir contractor – Jasper Randall
- Orchestra contractor – Alan Umstead

Instruments

- Bass – Craig Nelson, Jack Jezzerio, Jordan Wright, Elizabeth Stewart, Quentin Flowers, Sarah Ransom, Victor Gonzalez
- Bassoon – Jim Lotz, Peter Kolkay
- Cello – Alex Krew, Anthony Lamarchina, Elizabeth Robinson, Emily Nelson, Ian Robinson, Keith Nicholas, Kevin Bate, Paul Maiksy, Sarah Berry, Scott Peters, Xiao Fan Zhang, Nick Gold
- Clarinet – Bill Jackson, James Zimmermann, Katherine Kohler, Spencer Prewitt, Todd Waldecker
- Flute – Abi Coffer, Erik Gratton
- Horn – Angela DeBoer, Gordon James, Harry Ditzel, Jeffrey Whaley, Joey Demko, Kelsey Bentley, Leander Star, Tara Johnson
- Oboe – Luke Simonsen
- Percussion – Eric Darken, Scott Corey
- Piano – Fabian Almazan, Nate Strasser
- Trombone – Barry Green, Matt Jefferson, Prentiss Hobbs
- Trumpet – José Sibaja, Nathan Warner, Steve Patrick
- Tuba – Joe Murphy
- Viola – Bergen Christensen, Bruce Christiansen, Carl Larson, Elizabeth Lamb, Idalynn Besser, Jack Griffin, Jim Grosjean, Kameron Myers, Michael Holub, Seanad Chang, Shu Zheng Yang, Simona Rusu
- Violin – Alan Umstead, Alayna Nicotera, Alicia Enstrom, Amy Helman, Bruce Wethey, Carrie Bailey, Catherine Umstead, Conni Ellisor, Eliza Cho, Emily Crane, Erin Hall, Erin Long, Gerald Greer, Gordon Tsai, Janet Darnall, Jenny Bifano, Julia Fisher Jocelyn, Julia Noone, Jung-Min Shin, Karen Winkelmann, Katelyn Kelly, Kimberly Yokoyama, Liz Kitts, Maria Conti, Mary Kathryn Vanosdale, Patricia Rudisill, Peter Povey, Ricardo Amador, Sean Claire, Stefan Petrescu, Wei Tsun Chang, Wendy Case, Gabriel Lefkowitz

Management

- Music business and legal affairs for Focus Features – Tanya Perara, Terra Hatch
- Executive in charge of music for Focus Features – Mike Knobloch
- Marketing manager for Back Lot Music – Nikki Walsh
- Production manager for Back Lot Music – Andy Kalyvas
- Music production supervisor for Focus Features – Natalie Hayden

== Accolades ==
Award / Film Festival	Nomination	Recipient	Result	Ref.
Academy Awards	Best Original Song	"Stand Up" – Joshuah Brian Campbell and Cynthia Erivo	Nominated	
Critics' Choice Awards	Best Song	"Stand Up" – Joshuah Brian Campbell and Cynthia Erivo	Nominated	
Golden Globe Awards	Best Original Song	"Stand Up" – Joshuah Brian Campbell and Cynthia Erivo	Nominated	
Grammy Awards	Best Song Written for Visual Media	"Stand Up" – Joshuah Brian Campbell and Cynthia Erivo	Nominated	
Hollywood Music in Media Awards	Best Original Score – Feature Film	Terence Blanchard	Nominated	
Hollywood Music in Media Awards	Best Original Song – Feature Film	"Stand Up" – Joshuah Brian Campbell and Cynthia Erivo	Won	
NAACP Image Awards	Outstanding Soundtrack/Compilation Album	Harriet (Original Motion Picture Soundtrack) – Terence Blanchard	Nominated	
NAACP Image Awards	Outstanding Song – Traditional	"Stand Up" – Joshuah Brian Campbell and Cynthia Erivo	Nominated	
Satellite Awards	Best Original Score	Terence Blanchard	Nominated	
