= The Last Duel (soundtrack) =

The Last Duel (Original Motion Picture Soundtrack)

Film score by Harry Gregson-Williams
- Released: October 15, 2021
- Recorded: 2020–2021
- Studio: Newman Scoring Stage, Twentieth Century Studios
- Genre: Film score
- Length: 45:16
- Label: Hollywood
- Producer: Harry Gregson-Williams

Harry Gregson-Williams chronology
Infinite (2021)	The Last Duel (2021)	House of Gucci (2021)

The Last Duel (Original Motion Picture Soundtrack) is the soundtrack to the 2021 film of the same name directed by Ridley Scott. Featuring musical score composed and conducted by Harry Gregson-Williams, who previously collaborated with Scott in Kingdom of Heaven (2005) and The Martian (2015), the soundtrack that accompanied 21 tracks from the film's score, released by Hollywood Records on October 15, 2021.

== Development ==
Gregson-Williams looked back to the advantage of the 14th century setting to guide the score and the narrative that builds to the judicial duel Jean de Carrouges (Matt Damon) and Jacques Le Gris (Adam Driver) after Marguerite (Jodie Comer) accuses the latter of rape. Scott had suggested him not to underscore the battle sequences, going with the "sound effects of horses snorting and swords clashing" and provide intro and outro music for those sequences.

In an unusual way of composing the film's music, Gregson-Williams tasked to take note of the last page of the script, which had a sequence where Marguerite singing to her young child (ultimately deleted from the film). Taking inspiration from medieval composer Theobald, Count of Champagne, he provided a melodic theme that eventually became Marguerite's theme. For de Carrouges, he wanted the thematic material "to start out quiet, stout and heroic and maybe warlike drums, but quite expected" and for Le Gris, he wanted an unsettling tone, for which he sought singer Iestyn Davies to provide countertenor vocals. He further integrated with moody orchestral textures and gentle synthesizers for the "dark and imposing music" to surround Jacques [Le Gris] in the third act.

He considered medieval instruments to bring historical authenticity to the score, but as he felt that it would restrict them to move the story forward, especially in the Rashomon-style narrative between the three characters, he used a consort of viols that had "an edgy sound and bring to mind early music" despite not being developed during that period, and used lutes and gossamers, being layered over a "decent-sized orchestra".

Gregson-Williams wanted a vocal element to provide an essence to the score, where unlike, Kingdom of Heaven, which employed more than 100 members of London's Bach Choir, he recruited the British acapella octet group Voces8, led by English soprano artist Grace Davidson. About her performance, Gregson-Williams said "She sings not in an operatic way but with quite little vibrato, which I really liked [...] It's very direct — an intimate sound that's very pristine."

== Track listing ==
No.	Title	Artist(s)	Length
1.	"Duel Preparations"		3:36
2.	"Leaving for Scotland"		2:42
3.	"Marguerite de Carrouges"		2:18
4.	"Returning Home"		1:14
5.	"Jean de Carrouges"		1:18
6.	"Managing the Estate"		2:23
7.	"Court of King Charles"		0:56
8.	"The Wolves"		2:33
9.	"Confrontation"		0:37
10.	"Jacques LeGris"		1:13
11.	"I've Never Seen You Like This"		1:12
12.	"Confession"		2:16
13.	"I Offer You a Name"		3:28
14.	"House Meeting"		0:58
15.	"Chapter 3"		1:11
16.	"Left Alone"		1:17
17.	"Forgive Me for Intruding"		1:27
18.	"Tell No One"		2:28
19.	"The Duel"		5:12
20.	"The Aftermath"		3:08
21.	"Celui Que Je Désire"	Grace Davidson	3:49
Total length:			45:16

== Reception ==
Music critic Jonathan Broxton summarised, "unlike The Green Knight, the comparative straightforwardness of The Last Duel will likely make it much more palatable to mainstream audiences than Daniel Hart's offbeat experimental effort. It is perhaps best described as a more serious take on Kingdom of Heaven, and people who admired the dramatic non-action parts of that score will have a positive experience with this one [...] Combine this with some expertly-researched medieval music and authentic period instruments, and you have a score which succeeds on all fronts." James Southall of Movie Wave wrote "The Last Duel is fine music – perhaps like a sanitised, much more easy listening take on Daniel Hart's recent The Green Knight – as an album perhaps the brevity of so many of the cues is a bit of a blocker to the listening experience, but it's a calming album, ethereal at times". Anton Smit of Soundtrack World wrote "If you think about duels and medieval times, you think about fighting, clashing swords and a lot of manly adrenaline, but the music does not reflect that at all. Instead, the music is more about tension, emotion and drama."

== Accolades ==
Gregson-Williams' score was shortlisted as one of the contenders for the Academy Award for Best Original Score at the 94th Academy Awards, but is not nominated.

Award	Category	Nominee(s)	Result	Ref.
Hollywood Music in Media Awards	Best Original Score in a Feature Film	Harry Gregson-Williams	Nominated	
International Film Music Critics Association	Film Score of the Year	The Last Duel	Nominated	
International Film Music Critics Association	Best Original Score for a Drama Film	Ben Affleck	Nominated	
Satellite Awards	Best Original Score	Harry Gregson-Williams	Nominated	
