= The Monuments Men (disambiguation) =

The Monuments Men may refer to:

- The Monuments Men, a 2014 film directed by George Clooney adapted from the Robert M. Edsel book
  - The Monuments Men (soundtrack), the soundtrack album composed by Alexandre Desplat for the film
- The Monuments Men (book), a 2009 non-fiction book by Robert M. Edsel about the Monuments, Fine Arts, and Archives program
- Monuments, Fine Arts, and Archives program, an Allied World War II unit whose members were often referred to as "Monuments Men"
