= Society of the Snow (soundtrack) =

Society of the Snow (Soundtrack from the Netflix Film)

Film score by Michael Giacchino
- Released: 4 January 2024
- Recorded: 2023
- Venue: Abbey Road Studios
- Genre: Film score
- Length: 70:55
- Label: Netflix Music
- Producer: Michael Giacchino

Michael Giacchino chronology
Next Goal Wins (2023)	Society of the Snow (2023)	IF (2024)

Singles from Society of the Snow (Soundtrack from the Netflix Film)
- 1. "Found" Released: 8 September 2023; 2. "Andes Ascent" Released: 10 November 2023

Society of the Snow (Soundtrack from the Netflix Film) is the soundtrack to the 2023 film of the same name directed by J. A. Bayona. It is an adaptation of Pablo Vierci's book of the same name, which is about the Uruguayan 1972 Andes flight disaster. Featuring musical score composed by Michael Giacchino, the album featured 28 tracks and was released by Netflix Music on 4 January 2024.

== Background ==
In June 2023, Bayona announced that Michael Giacchino would compose the musical score for Society of the Snow, after their previous collaboration on Jurassic World: Fallen Kingdom (2018). It was Giacchino's first Spanish film, which Bayona felt that his music "brings a special voice and energy that turns the Andes odyssey into an even more relevant, encouraging and universal story".

Giacchino has said Society of the Snow was the most emotional film he had worked on to date, following Pixar's Up (for which he had won an Academy Award), due to the dread, isolation and helplessness of the survivors. Speaking to GoldDerby, he admitted that he tries to put on the shoes of fictional characters for whom his music had to be written, doing so for the real people who survived the ordeal is "wholly different". Furthermore, Giacchino met with two survivors of the plane crash to study their experiences of the disaster and its aftermath, as he thought it as the only way to get the truth of what the music should do. He admitted the score at times is bleak, but also melancholic. Due to these experiences - Giacchino declined to use any puns in the names of the tracks on the soundtrack, which are a trademark of his previous film and television compositions.

Giacchino employed a vocal choir that sings in the language of Mapuche, an indigenous language of the Andes, which he felt that "was the voice of the people who didn't come back [...] It's really talking about Mother Earth and nature and all the things they were surrounded by at the time". The score was recorded at the Abbey Road Studios in London, England with minimal orchestra and devoid of brass, due to the characters' religious upbringings.

The score was preceded with the first track, titled Found, released on 8 September 2023, the day before its premiere at the 80th Venice International Film Festival. The second track, Andres Ascent, was released on 10 November. Netflix Music released the full score on 4 January 2024.

== Track listing ==
No.	Title	Length
1.	"Leaving Home"	1:23
2.	"Crash"	1:04
3.	"Barren"	1:33
4.	"Alien World"	2:56
5.	"Flashback"	1:03
6.	"First Scout"	1:32
7.	"Susy Passes"	8:18
8.	"News Radio"	0:58
9.	"What Do I Become"	1:14
10.	"The Second Expedition"	4:43
11.	"Trapped"	0:44
12.	"Today Is My Birthday"	1:20
13.	"What's the Limit"	2:31
14.	"I See the Sky"	2:01
15.	"A Plan to Cross the Mountains"	3:10
16.	"Arturo's Death"	0:55
17.	"Setting Out"	1:07
18.	"Heading Back"	2:03
19.	"Take Home the Love"	1:13
20.	"Nando Returns"	5:02
21.	"Radio Failure"	0:50
22.	"Sleeping Bag"	0:53
23.	"Numa Accepts His Place"	5:30
24.	"Andes Ascent"	4:16
25.	"Onward"	3:16
26.	"Over the River"	1:09
27.	"Found"	6:22
28.	"Home"	4:06
Total length:		70:55

== Reception ==
David Rooney of The Hollywood Reporter wrote that "[Michael] Giacchino's hard-working, typically forceful orchestral score can only do so much to keep the momentum humming". Guy Lodge of Variety described it as "a typically maximalist score from Michael Giacchino that throws frantic percussion and a keening choir in alongside the ample strings". Amon Warmann of Empire wrote "Regular Bayona collaborator Michael Giacchino accentuates proceedings with a score that alternates between haunting horror chords and moving melodies." Pete Hammond of Deadline Hollywood called it a "stirring musical score".

James Southall of Movie Wave wrote "Society of the Snow is what great film music should be – it doesn't shy away from accentuating the lows as well as the highs, it paints a tremendously vivid dramatic picture, it treats the real-life horrors with great respect and features moments of tremendous beauty." Music critic Jonathan Broxton described it as the "subtle" and one of the "most understated of Giacchino's career".

== Accolades ==
In December 2023, the score was shortlisted for Best Original Score at the 96th Academy Awards, but failed to get nominated.

Award	Date	Category	Recipient	Result	Ref.
Hollywood Music in Media Awards	15 November 2023	Best Original Score — Independent Film (Foreign Language)	Michael Giacchino	Won	
Critics' Choice Awards	14 January 2024	Best Score	Michael Giacchino	Nominated	
Feroz Awards	26 January 2024	Best Original Soundtrack	Michael Giacchino	Nominated	
CEC Medals	5 February 2024	Best Music	Michael Giacchino	Nominated	
Goya Awards	10 February 2024	Best Original Score	Michael Giacchino	Won	
Satellite Awards	18 February 2024	Best Original Score	Michael Giacchino	Nominated	
