= Spotlight (soundtrack) =

Spotlight (Original Motion Picture Soundtrack)

Film score by Howard Shore
- Released: November 6, 2015
- Recorded: 2015
- Genre: Film score
- Length: 33:13
- Label: Howe Records
- Producer: Howard Shore

Howard Shore chronology
The Hobbit: The Battle of the Five Armies (2014)	Spotlight (2015)	Denial (2016)

Spotlight (Original Motion Picture Soundtrack) is the soundtrack album to the 2015 film of the same name. The film's original score is written and composed by Howard Shore, who used a 10-piece chamber orchestra, with the piano being the primary instrument to highlight the film's theme and motifs, instead of writing music for the characters, which Shore had approached in the music of The Lord of the Rings and The Hobbit series. The score was released by Shore's label Howe Records on November 6, 2015.

== Development ==
"I wrote themes and motifs based on those ideas away from the film, more based on the story and the screenplay. I like to work that way. Then, once the film was close to an edit, I started to do what I call scoring the film where I take pieces of these compositions and start to write them into the film, to score the film, if you will."

— Howard Shore

In an interview to Bill Desowitz of IndieWire, Shore described it as "I look for the rhythms of the film, how the actors move, how dialogue is expressed, how the scenes are cut [and lit]". Instead of writing music for specific characters, Shore devised the score around themes and motifs that he discussed with McCarthy, such as the pressure of the church, investigative reporting, legacy journalism and the victims' pain and anguish (titled as the cues). He discussed "I work on music away from the film for quite a while and then start applying all of these compositional ideas. The pieces are very detailed with harmony and counterpoint that are interwoven through the film."

The score consisted of a 10-piece orchestra, with instruments include piano, electric keyboard, harp, percussion, fiddle, accordion, electric bass, electric guitar, acoustic guitar and French horn. Shore used the piano as the primary instrument of the film, as it had "a black and white, ebony and ivory quality to it" which connected with the newspaper, adding that there was certain truthfulness to the sound, which would work well for "a story based on the discovery of the truth". He felt that the chamber orchestra used the thematic language to work as a theme to various approaches in terms of how the music was used depending on the theme itself.

Shore recalled that the scene he found the hardest to score, were "the directory investigative montage and the ending that connects the residence of one of the Spotlight team to the close vicinity of one of the accused priests. It was a pre-Internet investigation using a very tedious and rather old-fashioned type of approach. The method proved very difficult but it was successful and led to the major discovery that pushed the case wide open." Some of the scenes he recalled, was in the conclusion, where Robby (Michael Keaton) returns back to the Spotlight office and the camera turns close to him, and though he does not say anything, the music makes the shift, that matched his expression that he had accomplished what he set out to do, as he got the story out in the way he wanted. Shore described that "It's not triumphant by any means, because the movie ends on somewhat of a tragic note by listing all of the countries in the world where this type of abuse was going on. But I think that look on his face is that small glimmer of hope that maybe he could help invoke a change in the world."

== Track listing ==
No.	Title	Length
1.	"Spotlight"	1:03
2.	"Deference and Complicity"	1:13
3.	"Investigative Journalism"	2:10
4.	"Legacy"	1:28
5.	"The Directories"	2:40
6.	"Keep Silent"	2:31
7.	"Summer Investigation"	2:00
8.	"The Children"	1:15
9.	"Pressure of the Church"	1:37
10.	"The Sealed Documents"	2:06
11.	"The Globe Newsroom"	2:02
12.	"Courthouse"	1:11
13.	"Practice and Policy"	2:07
14.	"City on the Hill"	2:09
15.	"Pain and Anguish"	1:01
16.	"Night Mass"	1:04
17.	"Delivering the News"	3:40
18.	"The Story Breaks"	1:56
Total length:		33:13

== Reception ==
Music critic Jonathan Broxton of Movie Music UK summarised "The themes are ambiguously understated, and as such will not resonate with the 'common listener', while the reliance on rhythm, texture and movement rather than melody and variation will likely alienate those who need more of the latter and less of the former in their film music. Not only that, but anyone who comes to this score having loved his Lord of the Rings and Hobbit scores are likely to be aghast, especially if they don't realize that this sort of music, rather than the bold strokes provided for Frodo and company, has typified much more of his career."

Justin Chang of Variety wrote that Shore's score "busily marking the passage of time in the background". Michael Philips of Chicago Tribune wrote "Composer Howard Shore probably needed one more insinuating piano theme on which to pull moody variations. There are moments of overstatement, and some drab staging. But it feels honest and earnest in all the right ways."

Collider ranked the musical score for Spotlight third on the "10 Best Movie Scores of 2015". Matt Goldberg complimented "Relying mostly on piano, Spotlight almost has the feel of a dirge and provides a constant reminder of innocence lost." IndieWire also listed the scored in the "30 Best Scores & Soundtracks of 2015", while a review complimented:

"Steering away from the religious allusions or Boston Irish folksiness that lesser composers might have employed, Shore's work here gives the film much of its propulsive, ever-searching energy, pushing you along with the journalists as they try to make their case, relying on a simple, almost minimalist piano-led collection of instruments. It's as sober, understated, unsentimental and sophisticated as the film it works for, and yet it doesn't feel like Shore's restraining himself: Indeed, as different as it is from his other work, it feels like he's the only composer who could have written it."

== Accolades ==
Award	Date of ceremony	Category	Recipient(s)	Result	Ref.
Critics' Choice Awards	January 17, 2016	Best Score	Howard Shore	Nominated	
Satellite Awards	February 21, 2016	Best Original Score	Howard Shore	Nominated	
