= The Informant! (soundtrack) =

2009 film score by Marvin Hamlisch

The Informant! (Original Motion Picture Soundtrack)

Film score by Marvin Hamlisch
- Released: September 15, 2009
- Recorded: 2009
- Studio: Eastwood Scoring Stage, Warner Bros. Studios, Burbank, California
- Genre: Film score
- Length: 36:17
- Label: Warner Sunset; Warner Bros.
- Producer: Marvin Hamlisch

Marvin Hamlisch chronology
The Mirror Has Two Faces (1996)	The Informat! (2009)	Behind the Candelabra (2013)

The Informant! (Original Motion Picture Soundtrack) is the film score to the 2009 film The Informant! directed by Steven Soderbergh and starred Matt Damon. The film score is composed by Marvin Hamlisch and released through Warner Sunset Records and Warner Bros. Records on September 15, 2009. It was Hamlisch's final film he worked on, before his death on August 7, 2012.

== Development ==
Soderbergh listened to the original score for the Woody Allen-directorial Bananas (1971) which was composed by Hamlisch and liked the work. When he approached the composer to work for the film, the latter agreed as he would not refuse the offer to work with Soderbergh. The Informant! was Hamilsch first film he composed after a decade-long hiatus since The Mirror Has Two Faces (1996), as he had worked mostly on plays.

On working on this film, Hamlisch noted that most of the films did not have a unique range of score unlike this film; the very thought had him intrigued. Though he noted that every note had been written out hodgepodge, they serve a purpose with the film. Though he did not read the novel based on the film, he met the original Mark Whitacre and his wife during the screening, who felt that his work was appropriate for the film.

Hamlisch noted that Soderbergh did not want energetic music, but had to underline the funny aspect, alerting the audience that the film was a comedy. He admitted that the music signified the mind of Whitacre and his perception, as he was bipolar, thereby becoming another character for the film. With this understanding, Hamlisch composed a "light and breezy" theme that uses 1960s hammond organ, but when the character imagines himself as an undercover agent, he composed a James Bond-inspired theme utilizing electric guitars and bongos. (Note: Hamlisch also composed the score for the Bond film The Spy Who Loved Me (1977).)

Most of the score has been underlined with jazz elements, like piccolos, kazoos, bass saxophone and fiddles, which used when Whitacre is taking a polygraph test, all contributed to the zany atmosphere. An 18-piece band in New York City, with Hamlisch playing the Piano contributed to the score. He composed an original song "Trust Me" with lyrics by his longtime collaborators Alan and Marilyn Bergman and performed by Steve Tyrell, which also featured an instrumental version, where the song was arranged and conducted in the Frank Sinatra-manner. The song was composed in order to indicate the comedic undertones to the audience, and the song was written in 1 1/2–3 minutes. A couple of bars had been used for writing the song, where the melody was tuned before the lyrics being written.

== Reception ==
William Ruhlmann of AllMusic called it a "the most delightful soundtrack album of 2009" and added "this is a score that is anything but a subtle background to the action; it's foreground music that helps dictate the tone of the film". Christian Clemmensen of Filmtracks wrote "Hamlisch, firmly rooted in his comfort zone, nails it with authority." Jonathan Broxton of Movie Music UK noted that he liked the score, partially as it "represents a welcome return to the silver screen for Hamlisch" and also being the "absolute antithesis to all the inane testosterone-fuelled action scores that have littered the summer’s film music scene". James Southall of Movie Wave wrote "the whole score is simply a delight."

Peter Bradshaw of The Guardian called it "a relentlessly jazzy, wacky musical score from Hollywood veteran Marvin Hamlisch". Kirk Honeycutt of The Hollywood Reporter called it a "jaunty score, like something out of a 1960s Doris Day movie". Chris Roberts of Uncut called it "jarringly jaunty". Mike Goodridge of Screen International described it a "razzle-dazzle comedy score". Manohla Dargis of The New York Times called it a "zany" and "neo-slapstick" score, while Kim Newman of Empire called it a "breezy Bond knock-off score".

Dana Stevens of Slate called it a "bouncy score, which sounds like something a ‘70s cartoon character would bop down the street to, grows ever punchier." Todd McCarthy of Variety wrote "the jaunty, old-fashioned score by Marvin Hamlisch serve as immediate tipoffs as to the film’s hyperreal intentions". Christopher Orr of The Atlantic called Hamlisch's score, "a dizzy, inventive triumph, a throwback pastiche of whistling, tubas, and kazoos." George Lang of The Oklahoman wrote "Marvin Hamlisch's score only accentuates the film's goofball aesthetic."

== Track listing ==
No.	Title	Length
1.	"The Informant"	5:05
2.	"Meet Mark"	2:16
3.	"Car Meeting"	1:40
4.	"The Raid"	2:50
5.	"Multi-Tasking"	2:28
6.	"Polygraph"	1:43
7.	"Boxes"	2:25
8.	"After Car"	2:15
9.	"Trust Me" (Instrumental)	3:57
10.	"Sellout"	2:46
11.	"Triplets"	1:13
12.	"Golf"	1:21
13.	"Trust Me" (Steve Tyrell)	3:36
14.	"The Informant!" (solo piano)	2:42
Total length:		36:17

== Personnel ==
Credits adapted from liner notes:

- Music composer and producer – Marvin Hamlisch
- Recording and mixing – Todd Whitelock
- Score editor – Missy Cohen
- Liner notes – Marvin Hamlisch, Steven Soderbergh
- Art direction – Sandeep Sriram
- Music administrator – Debi Streeter
- Music business affairs – Keith Zajic, Lisa Margolis
- Executive in charge of music – Jason Linn, Doug Frank

Orchestra

- Orchestra – Hollywood Studio Symphony
- Orchestrator – Larry Hochman
- Conductor – Marvin Hamlisch
- Contractor – Michael Keller

Instruments

- Acoustic and electric bass– David Kuhn
- Acoustic guitar – Scott Kuney, Kevin Kuhn
- Alto saxophone – Vincent DellaRocca
- Baritone saxophone, bassoon – Chad Smith
- Bass Clarinet, oboe – David Young
- Cello – Deborah Assael, Sarah Hewitt, Stephanie Cummins
- Clarinet – David Young, John Moses, Vincent DellaRocca
- Drums – Dave Ratajczak
- Electric guitar, banjo – Kevin Kuhn
- Flute – Brian Miller, Keith Bonner
- French horn – Bob Carlisle, Larry Di Bello
- Harmonica – William Galison
- Harp – Laura Sherman
- Percussion – Ben Herman, Eric Charleston, Joseph Passaro
- Piano – James Abbott, Lee Musiker
- Piccolo flute – Brian Miller
- Synthesizer, organ (hammond) – James Abbott
- Tenor saxophone – David Young, John Moses
- Trombone – Birch Johnson, Keith O'Quinn
- Trumpet – Brian Pareschi, John Chudoba, Bob Millikan
- Violin – Antoine Silverman, Paul Woodiel
- Whistle – Kevin Osborne

== Accolades ==
Award	Date of ceremony	Category	Recipients	Result	Ref.
Critics Choice Awards	January 15, 2010	Best Score	Marvin Hamlisch	Nominated	
Chicago Film Critics Association	December 21, 2009	Best Original Score	Marvin Hamlisch	Nominated	
Golden Globe Awards	January 17, 2010	Best Original Score	Marvin Hamlisch	Nominated	
Houston Film Critics Society	December 19, 2009	Best Original Score	Marvin Hamlisch	Nominated	
International Film Music Critics Association	December 14, 2009	Best Original Score for a Comedy Film	Marvin Hamlisch	Nominated	
Motion Picture Sound Editors	February 20, 2010	Best Sound Editing – Music in a Feature Film	Missy Cohen (supervising music editor)	Nominated	
Online Film Critics Society	January 5, 2010	Best Original Score	Marvin Hamlisch	Nominated	
Satellite Awards	December 20, 2009	Best Original Score	Marvin Hamlisch	Nominated	
