= Best Original Score =

Best Original Score is the name of an award which is presented by various film, television and theatre organizations, festivals, and people's awards. It may refer to:

- Academy Award for Best Original Score
- Academy of Canadian Cinema and Television Award for Best Achievement in Music – Original Score
- Golden Globe Award for Best Original Score
- Satellite Award for Best Original Score
- Tony Award for Best Original Score
