= Gravity (soundtrack) =

Gravity: Original Motion Picture Soundtrack

Soundtrack album by Steven Price
- Released: September 17, 2013 (download); October 1, 2013 (physical)
- Recorded: 2012
- Studios: Abbey Road Studios and British Grove Studios (London, United Kingdom)
- Genre: Soundtrack
- Length: 71:44
- Label: WaterTower Music
- Producers: Alfonso Cuarón; Steven Price

Gravity: Original Motion Picture Soundtrack is the soundtrack album of the 3D science fiction thriller film Gravity, composed by Steven Price, conducted by Geoff Alexander and performed by the Hollywood Studio Symphony. The album was released in 2013 via WaterTower Music label.

Price's score was universally applauded by film critics and audiences alike, leading Price to win and receive nominations for several Best Original Score awards at ceremonies, including a BAFTA Award, a Satellite Award and an Academy Award, as well as a Golden Globe Award nomination.

== Development ==
"We knew we needed to express silence. We didn't want the score to be descriptive, but psychological and emotional. We composed a score which is expressive of surroundings. Here the music is moving around you all the time."

— Gravity director Alfonso Cuarón, on the film's musical intent

Composer Steven Price was originally called in to help out for three weeks on the music design of Gravity. After having a creative discussion with director Alfonso Cuarón, Price began coming up with a template of sounds and noises that eventually led to him being hired as the film's composer. As work began on the film's score, Cuarón and Price set ground rules for distancing the score from conventional Hollywood-style action scores such as omitting the use of percussion. "Ordinarily in an action film you're often competing with explosions and god knows what else, whereas with this [movie] music could do things a different way," said Price. "With everything we did we would try and look beyond the normal way of doing things. [For] some of the action sequences where there are explosions, I knew that [...] those explosions had to be inherent."

The score was recorded in small groups or single instruments as opposed to a collective orchestra in order for each sound to be electronically processed and mixed individually to create a layered and surrounding effect.

== Reception ==
Professional ratings
Review scores
Source	Rating
Empire	4/5 stars
Filmtracks	3/5 stars
Mania	A+
Movie Wave	5/5 stars
Screen Invasion	5/5 stars
Sputnikmusic	4.5/5 stars
Synchrotones	4/5 stars

Steven Price's score has been acclaimed by critics and audiences alike, in particular for its two final tracks, "Shenzou" and "Gravity". It was nominated for and won multiple awards in the Best Original Score category at several ceremonies: it received a nomination for Best Original Score at the 71st Golden Globe Awards and won Best Original Music at the 67th British Academy Film Awards and Best Original Score at the 86th Academy Awards. James Southall of Movie Wave awarded the album five stars out of a possible five and said that "it feels like the most intelligent and most satisfying score for a science fiction movie since Ennio Morricone's stunning, dishearteningly lambasted Mission to Mars."

=== Accolades ===
Award	Date	Category	Result
Academy Awards	March 2, 2014	Best Original Score	Won
Alliance of Women Film Journalists	December 19, 2013	Best Music or Score	Nominated
Awards Circuit Community Awards	February 28, 2014	Best Original Score	Won
British Academy Film Awards	February 16, 2014	Best Original Music	Won
Broadcast Film Critics Association	January 16, 2014	Best Score	Won
Central Ohio Film Critics Association	January 2, 2014	Best Score	Runner-up
Chicago Film Critics Association	December 13, 2013	Best Original Score	Nominated
Denver Film Critics Society	January 13, 2014	Best Original Score	Won
Golden Globe Awards	January 12, 2014	Best Original Score	Nominated
Grammy Awards	February 8, 2015	Best Score Soundtrack for Visual Media	Nominated
Houston Film Critics Society	December 15, 2013	Best Original Score	Won
San Diego Film Critics Society	December 11, 2013	Best Original Score	Nominated
Satellite Awards	February 23, 2014	Best Original Score	Won
St. Louis Gateway Film Critics Association	December 16, 2013	Best Musical Score	Nominated
Washington D.C. Area Film Critics Association	December 9, 2013	Best Score	Nominated

== Track listing ==
All tracks are written by Steven Price.

No.	Title	Length
1.	"Above Earth"	1:50
2.	"Debris"	4:24
3.	"The Void"	6:15
4.	"Atlantis"	3:43
5.	"Don't Let Go"	11:11
6.	"Airlock"	1:57
7.	"ISS"	2:53
8.	"Fire"	2:57
9.	"Parachute"	7:40
10.	"In the Blind"	3:07
11.	"Aurora Borealis"	1:43
12.	"Aningaaq"	5:08
13.	"Soyuz"	1:43
14.	"Tiangong"	6:28
15.	"Shenzou"	6:11
16.	"Gravity"	4:35
Total length:		71:44

Notes

- "Airlock" is actually not played during the film. The beginning of "Aningaaq" is instead used in the scene it was intended for.
- "Shenzou" includes a spelling mistake as the spacecraft is called Shenzhou.

== Credits and personnel ==
Credits adapted from AllMusic and from the liner notes of Gravity: Original Motion Picture Soundtrack.

Performers and musicians

- The Hollywood Studio Symphony – orchestra
- Philip Collin – organ
- Katherine Ellis – vocals
- Haley Glennie-Smith – vocals
- Lisa Hannigan – vocals
- Alasdair Malloy – glass harmonica
- Metro Voices – choir
- Will Schofield – cello soloist
- Vicci Wardman – principal viola

Technical personnel

- Geoff Alexander – conductor
- Robin Baynton – assistant music editor
- Christopher Benstead – music editor
- Paul Broucek – executive in charge of music
- David Butterworth – orchestration
- Gareth Cousins – score mixer, recording engineer
- Alfonso Cuarón – producer
- George Drakoulias – music supervisor
- Andrew Dudman – engineer
- Isobel Griffiths – orchestra contractor
- David Heyman – executive producer
- Martin Hollis – assistant engineer
- Toby Hulbert – assistant engineer
- Lewis Jones – assistant engineer
- Matt Jones – assistant engineer
- Joe Kearns – assistant
- Jason Linn – executive in charge of music
- Lisa Margolis - music business affairs
- Charlotte Matthews – orchestra contractor
- Everton Nelson – orchestra leader
- Jenny O'Grady – choir master
- Sam Okell – engineer
- Steven Price – composer, primary artist, producer
- Nicki Sherrod – executive in charge of music
- Sandeep Sriram – art direction
- Jill Streater – music preparation
- Christian Wright – mastering
