= The Last Samurai (soundtrack) =

The Last Samurai (Original Motion Picture Score)

Film score by Hans Zimmer
- Released: November 25, 2003
- Recorded: 2003
- Studios: Newman Scoring Stage, Twentieth Century Fox; Media Ventures; Cups 'N Strings
- Genre: Soundtrack
- Length: 59:41
- Label: Warner Sunset
- Producer: Hans Zimmer

Hans Zimmer chronology
Matchstick Men (2003)	The Last Samurai (2003)	King Arthur (2004)

The Last Samurai (Original Motion Picture Score) is the soundtrack to the 2003 film The Last Samurai directed by Edward Zwick and starring Tom Cruise. The film's original score is composed and arranged by Hans Zimmer and performed by the Hollywood Studio Symphony under the supervision of conductor and orchestrator Blake Neely. The score was released through Warner Sunset Records on November 25, 2003.

== Reception ==
Christian Clemmensen of Filmtracks.com wrote "Zimmer's supplemental ethnic instruments, though, along with his genuinely interesting contemplative work for the film, make The Last Samurai one his better efforts of the 2000's [sic]." Thomas Glorieux of Maintitles.net wrote "if Gladiator was powerful, raw and relentless (while equally moving at times), then The Last Samurai goes deeper so it can touch the soul." Tamara Sue Crews of Soundtrack World called it as "most enjoyable to simply allow the music to unfold its power to draw me into a certain state of emotion without considering the whos, hows and whys."

Simon K. of Sputnikmusic summarized "if you're a fan of OSTs, this is definitely worth checking out." Heather Phares of AllMusic called it as "a somber but expertly crafted score that ranks among Zimmer's finest work." Kirk Honeycutt of The Hollywood Reporter wrote "Hans Zimmer's score works a little too hard. He might have mixed Eastern and Western musical themes to greater advantage, but instead Zimmer sticks mostly to Western motifs and instruments." Todd McCarthy of Variety wrote "Hans Zimmer, whose 100th motion picture score this is, occasionally inflects the instrumentations of his industrious compositions with Japanese motifs." Matthew Wilkinson of Screen Rant listed the album as one of the iconic scores of the composer and summarized "Blending Japanese cultural music in with a high-paced action score when the film needs it, this soundtrack has everything."

== Live performances ==
Zimmer produced a rearrangement of the film's themes and released as "Last Samurai Suite" for his live album that featured "reimagining" of his themes from The Lion King (1994), Gladiator (2000), The Dark Knight (2008), Inception (2010) and Dunkirk (2017). He performed the score live at concerts in London.

== Track listing ==
The Last Samurai (Original Motion Picture Score) track listing
No.	Title	Length
1.	"A Way of Life"	8:04
2.	"Spectres in the Fog"	4:07
3.	"Taken"	3:36
4.	"A Hard Teacher"	5:44
5.	"To Know My Enemy"	4:49
6.	"Idyll's End"	6:41
7.	"Safe Passage"	4:57
8.	"Ronin"	1:53
9.	"Red Warrior"	3:56
10.	"The Way of the Sword"	7:59
11.	"A Small Measure of Peace"	10:31
Total length:		62:17

== Awards and nominations ==
Awards and nominations for The Last Samurai (Original Motion Picture Score)
Award	Category	Result	Ref.
Critics' Choice Movie Awards	Best Score	Nominated	
Golden Globe Awards	Best Original Score	Nominated	
Golden Satellite Awards	Best Original Score	Won	
Online Film Critics Society	Best Original Score	Nominated	
