= House of Gucci (soundtrack) =

House of Gucci (Music from the Motion Picture)

Soundtrack album by various artists
- Released: December 10, 2021
- Genres: Classical; pop; rock
- Length: 73:21
- Label: Decca

House of Gucci (Music from the Motion Picture) is the soundtrack to the 2021 film of the same name directed by Ridley Scott. It features songs from the 1970s and 1980s performed by George Michael, Donna Summer, David Bowie, Miguel Bosé, Caterina Caselli, Alice, Bruno Lauzi and David Stewart amongst several others. The album also included a score suite from Harry Gregson-Williams, who composed music for the film. The soundtrack was released by Decca Records on December 10, 2021, two weeks after the film.

== Development ==
Gregson-Williams composed music for the film, in his fourth collaboration with Scott as a composer, following Kingdom of Heaven (2005), The Martian (2015) and The Last Duel (2021); he worked on contributing additional music for Prometheus (2012) and Exodus: Gods and Kings (2014). After he finished composing for The Last Duel, Scott offered him the opportunity to compose the music for the film, whose role was to establish the romance between Maurizio Gucci (Adam Driver) and Patrizia Reggiani (Lady Gaga). Gregson-Williams felt it was not like any score he had done, as much of his music was interspersed with the needle drops that had been picked by Scott, which he felt was challenging and fun.

== Track listing ==
No.	Title	Artist(s)	Length
1.	"Faith"	George Michael	3:17
2.	"La ragazza col maglione" (Remaster 2004)	Pino Donaggio	2:43
3.	"On the Radio"	Donna Summer	4:05
4.	"Anna (Ana)"	Miguel Bosé	4:40
5.	"Love to Love You Baby" (Single Edit)	Donna Summer	3:22
6.	"Sono bugiarda (I'm a Believer)"	Caterina Caselli	2:52
7.	"Verdi: La traviata / Act 1 – Libiamo ne'lieti calici (Brindisi)"	Luciano Pavarotti, Joan Sutherland, London Opera Chorus, National Philharmonic Orchestra and Richard Bonynge	2:50
8.	"Una notte speciale" (2005 Remaster)	Alice	4:17
9.	"Ritornerai"	Bruno Lauzi	2:43
10.	"Here Comes the Rain Again" (Remastered Version)	Eurythmics, Annie Lennox and David Stewart	4:53
11.	"I Feel Love"	Donna Summer	3:11
12.	"Blue Monday" (12" Version)	New Order	7:30
13.	"Paid in Full"	Eric B. & Rakim	3:39
14.	"A Fifth of Beethoven"	Walter Murphy and The Big Apple Band	3:03
15.	"Heart of Glass"	Blondie	4:10
16.	"Ashes to Ashes" (Single Version) (2014 Remaster)	David Bowie	3:38
17.	"How Gee"	Black Machine	4:27
18.	"House of Gucci Score Suite"	Harry Gregson-Williams	8:01
Total length:			73:21

== Chart performance ==
Chart (2012)	Peak position
UK Compilation Albums (OCC)	86
UK Soundtrack Albums (OCC)	10
