= The Legend of Tarzan (soundtrack) =

The Legend of Tarzan (Original Motion Picture Soundtrack)

Soundtrack album / film score by Rupert Gregson-Williams
- Released: June 24, 2016 (digital); July 15, 2016 (physical)
- Recorded: 2016
- Genre: Film score
- Length: 71:19
- Label: WaterTower Music
- Producer: Rupert Gregson-Williams

Rupert Gregson-Williams chronology
The Do-Over (2016)	The Legend of Tarzan (2016)	Hacksaw Ridge (2016)

Singles from The Legend of Tarzan (Original Motion Picture Soundtrack)
- 1. "Better Love" Released: June 24, 2016

The Legend of Tarzan (Original Motion Picture Soundtrack) is the soundtrack and score album to the film of the same name featuring original music composed and arranged by Rupert Gregson-Williams. Initially, he was set to co-write the score with Hans Zimmer, before receiving the sole credit as the film's composer. WaterTower Music released the soundtrack album digitally on June 24, 2016, followed by a physical release on July 15, 2016. It featured two songs, "Opar" co-written by Gregson-Wiliams and Lebo M and performed by Zoe Mthiyane, and "Better Love" written and performed by Hozier, which was used in the film's end credits. Anthony Clarke, Thomas Farnon, and Tom Howe are credited for additional music.

The Japanese version of the film uses "Nawe, Nawe" by Alexandros as its theme song.

== Reception ==
Music critic Jonathan Broxton gave a mixed review for the soundtrack, saying "There's nothing greatly wrong with The Legend of Tarzan in the bigger scheme of things; it's functional, inoffensive, culturally respectful, and goes out of its way to mirror the current board-approved action music sound, which won't upset any of the film's key target demographics. "

== Track listing ==
No.	Title	Writer(s)	Artist(s)	Length
1.	"Opar"	Gregson-Williams; Lebo Morake	Zoe Mthiyane	3:28
2.	"Diamonds"	Gregson-Williams	Gregson-Williams	4:50
3.	"Togetherness"	Gregson-Williams	Gregson-Williams	1:44
4.	"Steamer and Butterfly"	Gregson-Williams; Thomas Farnon	Gregson-Williams	2:40
5.	"Orphaned"	Gregson-Williams	Gregson-Williams	2:46
6.	"Returning Home"	Gregson-Williams	Gregson-Williams	4:01
7.	"Campfire"	Gregson-Williams; Farnon	Gregson-Williams	2:40
8.	"Tarzan and Jane"	Gregson-Williams	Gregson-Williams	3:39
9.	"Village Ambush"	Gregson-Williams; Tom Howe	Gregson-Williams	4:41
10.	"Catching the Train"	Gregson-Williams; Howe	Gregson-Williams	2:16
11.	"Rom's Plan"	Gregson-Williams	Gregson-Williams	2:11
12.	"Akut Fight"	Gregson-Williams; Anthony Clarke	Gregson-Williams	2:16
13.	"Elephants in the Night"	Gregson-Williams	Gregson-Williams	3:12
14.	"Jane Escapes"	Gregson-Williams	Gregson-Williams	2:44
15.	"Jungle Shooting"	Gregson-Williams	Gregson-Williams	2:41
16.	"Kala's Death"	Gregson-Williams	Gregson-Williams	5:15
17.	"Where Was Your Honor?"	Gregson-Williams; Farnon	Gregson-Williams	2:29
18.	"Boma Port"	Gregson-Williams	Gregson-Williams	4:04
19.	"Stampede"	Gregson-Williams; Farnon	Gregson-Williams	4:33
20.	"On the Boat"	Gregson-Williams	Gregson-Williams	3:10
21.	"The Legend of Tarzan"	Gregson-Williams	Gregson-Williams	2:36
22.	"Better Love"	Andrew Hozier-Byrne	Hozier	3:23
Total length:				71:19

== Personnel ==
Album credits adapted from CD liner notes:

Instruments

- Cello – Peter Gregson
- Violin – Thomas Bowes
- Percussion – Paul Clarvis

Vocals

- Solo vocals – Zoe Mthiyane
- Vocal production – Lebo M
- Vocal recording – Johan Van Der Colff

Choir

- Choir – London Voices
- Choirmasters – Ben Parry, Terry Edwards

Orchestra

- Concertmaster – Thomas Bowes
- Orchestration and conductor – Alastair King
- Orchestra contractor – Isobel Griffiths
- Music preparation – Jill Streater

Management

- Music business and legal affairs – Dirk Hebert, Lisa Margolis, Ray Gonzalez
- Executive in charge of music (Warner Bros. Pictures) – Paul Broucek
- Executive in charge of soundtracks (WaterTower Music) – Jason Linn

Studio managers

- AIR Studios – Alison Burton
- Remote Control Productions – Shalini Singh

Production

- Music composer and arranger – Rupert Gregson-Williams
- Additional music and programming – Thomas Farnon, Tom Howe, Tony Clarke
- Technical score engineer – James Roberson
- Score recording – Nick Wollage
- Mixing – Alan Meyerson, Nick Wollage
- Mixing assistance – Forest Christenson, Tom Bailey
- Mastering – Gavin Lurssen
- Score editor – Allan Jenkins, JJ George, Andy Patterson
- Music production services – Steven Kofsky
- Pro-tools operator – Adam Miller

Cover

- Art direction – Sandeep Sriram
- Photography – Benjamin Ealovega
- Liner notes – David Yates
