= Parallel Mothers (soundtrack) =

Parallel Mothers (Original Motion Picture Soundtrack)

Film score by Alberto Iglesias
- Released: 30 December 2021
- Studio: AIR Studios, London
- Genre: Film score
- Length: 51:33
- Label: Quartet Records
- Producer: Alberto Iglesias

Alberto Iglesias chronology
The Human Voice (2020)	Parallel Mothers (2021)	Maixabel (2021)

Parallel Mothers (Original Motion Picture Soundtrack) is the soundtrack to the 2021 film Parallel Mothers directed by Pedro Almodóvar. The film is scored by Alberto Iglesias, a recurrent collaborator of Almodóvar, and the soundtrack that accompanied two songs and 17 cues from Iglesias' score was released by Quartet Records on 8 October 2021 coinciding with the Spanish theatrical release and 30 December 2021 in the United States.

== Development ==
Iglesias and Almodóvar collaborated for Parallel Mothers for the 13th time. Like their previous collaborations, Iglesias provided the score only after watching the final edit so that he could draw the musical ideas for the intense moments. At the crucial juncture, he came across how Cruz's character learns the truth about her baby which Iglesias described it as the soul of the film and he oriented the music to the suspense which gave him several voices for other sequences. He did not give two different themes for the characters instead followed a parallel structure, where the two themes would be one at the same time and syncs with the narration.

Much of the score was written for the string orchestra, where he used two different types—one being a string quintet, and the other, a 49-piece orchestra with strings, piano, woodwinds and harmonies, recorded at the AIR Studios in London—and built a separate musical language with the contrast. The score has a connection with the fandango, and also featured lullabies at some points, and suspense music that is akin to Bernard Herrmann's musical style.

== Track listing ==
No.	Title	Artist(s)	Length
1.	"Sesión de fotos"		1:11
2.	"El visillo volante"		2:14
3.	"Las visitas"		4:12
4.	"Fotos a la niña"		2:23
5.	"Prueba de maternidad"		4:41
6.	"El cuestionario del laboratorio"		0:49
7.	"Terrible certeza"		0:57
8.	"Madre de día"		2:12
9.	"La pesadilla"		2:52
10.	"Tortilla española"		0:57
11.	"Anita ha muerto"		2:52
12.	"No te despiertes"		2:40
13.	"La revelación del secreto"		10:32
14.	"Campo de cultivo"		0:47
15.	"La vieja cama"		1:16
16.	"Relato del bisabuelo asesinado"		0:49
17.	"En procesión / La fosa"		10:09
18.	"Summertime"	Janis Joplin	4:00
19.	"Autumn Leaves"	Miles Davis	11:04
Total length:			51:33

== Reception ==
A. O. Scott of The New York Times, Ian Freer of Empire and Justin Chang of Los Angeles Times described the score as "piercing", "striking" and "exquisitely moving". Nicholas Barber of IndieWire described it as "palpitating". Anthony Lane of The New Yorker said "the score, by Alberto Iglesias, could be that of a sad whodunnit". Stephanie Bunbury of Deadline Hollywood wrote "A truly inspired emotional roller-coaster of a score by Alberto Iglesias runs through almost the entire film that would give any Bette Davis movie a run for its melodramatic money." David Rooney of The Hollywood Reporter called it as a "Hitchcockian score" that is "lush and enveloping even by the composer’s distinguished standards".

== Accolades ==
Award	Date of ceremony	Category	Recipient(s)	Result	Ref.
Hollywood Music in Media Awards	17 November 2021	Original Score – Independent Film (Foreign Language)	Alberto Iglesias	Won	
Los Angeles Film Critics Association Awards	18 December 2021	Best Music/Score	Alberto Iglesias	Won	
Golden Globe Awards	9 January 2022	Best Original Score	Alberto Iglesias	Nominated	
Feroz Awards	29 January 2022	Best Original Soundtrack	Alberto Iglesias	Won	
77th CEC Medals	9 February 2022	Best Score	Alberto Iglesias	Nominated	
Satellite Awards	2 April 2022	Best Original Score	Alberto Iglesias	Nominated	
Academy Awards	27 March 2022	Best Original Score	Alberto Iglesias	Nominated	
Platino Awards	1 May 2022	Best Original Score	Alberto Iglesias	Won	
