= Hacksaw Ridge (soundtrack) =

Hacksaw Ridge (Original Motion Picture Soundtrack)

Film score by Rupert Gregson-Williams
- Released: November 4, 2016
- Recorded: September–October 2016
- Studios: Abbey Road Studios, London
- Genre: Film score
- Length: 53:56
- Label: Varèse Sarabande
- Producer: Rupert Gregson-Williams

Rupert Gregson-Williams chronology
The Legend of Tarzan (2016)	Hacksaw Ridge (2016)	Sandy Wexler (2017)

Hacksaw Ridge (Original Motion Picture Soundtrack) is the score album to the 2016 biographical war film Hacksaw Ridge directed by Mel Gibson. The film is scored by Rupert Gregson-Williams, who replaced John Debney, the original composer who had attached to write music for the film. The score was recorded at the Abbey Road Studios, London during September and October 2016. The score was released by Varèse Sarabande on November 4, alongside the film.

== Development ==
James Horner was originally approached to compose music for the film before his death in a plane crash in June 2015. That September, John Debney was hired to score music for the film after previously working with Gibson on The Passion of the Christ (2004). Debney had written and recorded much of the music for the film. However, the team was dissatisfied with Debney's score and it had been rejected before its premiere at the Venice Film Festival. Subsequently, Rupert Gregson-Williams replaced Debney as the film's composer in September 2016. Gregson-Williams did not want "the music to sound like it belonged to a conventional war hero; he [Doss] was bearing his faith and no gun" intending to strike an emotional tonal balance between the lead character's spirituality and bravery on the battlefield without being heavy-handed.

"Trying to understand and represent someone’s motives whose principles are so specific and deeply spiritual is not an easy task [...] Mel and I both felt it was important not to represent Desmond as a conventional war hero – he wasn’t. I wanted to drill down into the spiritual heart of the man and not represent him falsely. Andrew Garfield’s performance is so powerful I didn’t need to tell people how brave and special a man he was."

— Rupert Gregson-Williams, to Billboard, on writing the score for the lead character

For Doss' main theme, which was reminiscent of a Gregorian chant, he chose two bassoons and two cellos for a two-part melody that harkens back to his Virginian roots. The cue was underpinned in later iterations turning out to be a love theme, that was heard during the war scenes as Doss yearned to return to his wife, Dororthy. He intentionally left the score out of the first 10-minute battle scenes to let the sound take over, not changing the intensity of the sequence. But the music returns in the second battle scene, as Doss stood atop the ridge, doubting on his faith and pointed whether he should go back and save the men. The opening sequence was first scored for the film as it captured the exact tone need for the film: the brutality of war and the beauty of Virginia. He further used themes for Doss' faith and his early childhood in the Blue Ridge Mountains.

The score was recorded at the Abbey Road Studios with a 70-piece orchestra conducted by Cliff Masterson and accompanied by a 36-piece choir. Peter Gregson and Caroline Dale, played cellos alongside bassoon player Sarah Burnett. Varèse Sarabande released the soundtrack, featuring 16 tracks from Gregson-Williams score on the same date of its release, November 4, 2016.

== Track listing ==
All tracks are written by Rupert Gregson-Williams.

Track listing
No.	Title	Length
1.	"Okinawa Battlefield"	3:59
2.	"I Could Have Killed Him"	2:20
3.	"A Calling"	2:42
4.	"Pretty Corny"	1:44
5.	"Climbing for a Kiss"	3:47
6.	"Throw Hell at Him"	1:58
7.	"Sleep"	2:18
8.	"Dorothy Pleads"	3:17
9.	"Hacksaw Ridge"	4:20
10.	"Japanese Retake the Ridge"	4:36
11.	"I Can't Hear You"	2:54
12.	"One Man at a Time"	2:30
13.	"Rescue Continues"	3:46
14.	"A Miraculous Return"	2:50
15.	"Praying"	5:49
16.	"Historical Footage"	4:59
Total length:		53:56

== Reception ==
Calling it the "best score of Rupert Gregson-Williams’s career", music critic Jonathan Broxton of Movie Music UK said "... [Gregson-Williams] successfully navigates the fine line between allowing Desmond Doss’s faith and humanity to shine through the film, while not trivializing death or under-playing the butchery of war, and he does it with strong themes, intelligent orchestrations, and a healthy dollop of film music nostalgia that impressed enormously." Bernhard H. Heidkamp of Behind The Audio also commended the same and said "Hacksaw Ridge is a really solid score with a good, somewhat unique first half and some neat RCP-callbacks in its final act. Sadly, the repetitiveness of the main theme, some meandering and especially the not-bad-but-just-passable action music diminishes the listening experience a bit. Nonetheless, there are enough hidden gems in almost every track: a guitar part, some nice metallic percussion, the Horner-sensibilities in some of the quieter string-movements, and so on to make it Rupert Gregson-Williams’ best score to date and while it's not mindblowing, one hopes that this will open up some new paths to go."

Tall Writer of Blogcritics called it as "a strong soundtrack that matches the emotions". James Southall of Movie Wave called it as "a shallow but entertaining modern action score with some highlights that more than offset the low ones." Pete Simons of Synchrotones commented it as Gregson-Williams' "most impressive and perhaps most enjoyable score to date".

== Accolades ==
Award	Date of ceremony	Category	Recipient(s)	Result	Ref.
Hollywood Music in Media Awards	November 17, 2016	Best Original Score – Feature Film	Rupert Gregson-Williams	Nominated	
Satellite Awards	February 19, 2017	Best Original Score	Rupert Gregson-Williams	Nominated	
