= Amelia (soundtrack) =

Amelia (Original Motion Picture Soundtrack)

Film score by Gabriel Yared
- Released: October 20, 2009
- Recorded: 2009
- Studio: Abbey Road Studios, London
- Genre: Film score
- Length: 53:10
- Label: Varèse Sarabande
- Producer: Gabriel Yared; Kirsty Whalley

Gabriel Yared chronology
The Hedgehog (2009)	Amelia (2009)	In the Land of Blood and Honey (2011)

Amelia (Original Motion Picture Soundtrack) is the film score to the 2009 biographical film Amelia directed by Mira Nair, which featured Hilary Swank as aviation pioneer Amelia Earhart. The film score is composed by Gabriel Yared and released through Varèse Sarabande on October 20, 2009.

== Development ==
Gabriel Yared composed the film score. The album was recorded at the Abbey Road Studios in London and took him around five months to complete the score. The soundtrack was released through Varèse Sarabande record label on October 20, 2009.

== Reception ==
Jonathan Broxton of Movie Music UK wrote "[Amelia's score] has a similar tone to earlier Yared scores such as Message in a Bottle (1999) and Possession (2002), and fans of those works, or of John Barry's sweeping romance work, will find their tastes catered to here." Michael Koresky of IndieWire wrote "every time a plane soars, the traditional score by Gabriel Yared will swell". Ray Bennett of The Hollywood Reporter wrote "composer Gabriel Yared's orchestral score — muscular in the aerial scenes, jovial where it needs to be and foreboding in its evocation of Earhart's fate — ranks with his Academy Award-winning music for The English Patient (1996)."

Lisa Schwarzbaum of Entertainment Weekly wrote "composer Gabriel Yared lays on blasts of musical exclamations that are as distracting as sirens". Brent Simon of Screen International wrote "composer Gabriel Yared's score trades in conventional melodramatic cues." Justin Chang of Variety called it a "hyperactive score". Chris Bumbray of JoBlo.com wrote "a fantastic musical score by Gabriel Yared, which calls to mind the work of composer John Barry." Nick Schager of Slant Magazine wrote "Gabriel Yared's persistently swooning orchestral score does the heavy lifting when it comes to conveying the thrill of flight."

Peter Travers of Rolling Stone called it a "sudsy score". Manohla Dargis of The New York Times wrote "[the score] works hard to inject some emotional coloring into the proceedings [and] screams 1940s big-screen melodramatic excess and beautiful suffering." Ray Pride of Newcity wrote "Gabriel Yared's emphatic, old-fashioned yet slightly desperate score hails in from distant Minghella-ville."

== Track listing ==
No.	Title	Length
1.	"Introducing Amelia"	2:16
2.	"Flight to Wales"	4:27
3.	"Amelia and George"	4:14
4.	"No Longer a Passenger"	6:56
5.	"Flying with Eleanor Roosevelt"	2:37
6.	"Amelia and Gene"	3:05
7.	"The Ecstasy of Flying"	2:02
8.	"Vagabond of the Air"	3:39
9.	"Hawaii Crash"	2:22
10.	"The Call of the Wild"	3:11
11.	"Radio Love Call"	2:17
12.	"Final Flight"	11:03
13.	"Amelia"	5:01
Total length:		53:10

== Personnel ==
Credits adapted from liner notes:

- Music composer – Gabriel Yared
- Music producer – Gabriel Yared, Kirsty Whalley
- Recording and mixing – Peter Cobbin
- Music editor and programmer – Kirsty Whalley, Lewis Morison
- Technical engineer – Lewis Jones, Patrick Phillips
- Music coordinator – Becky Bentham
- Copyist – Dakota Music
- Executive producer – Robert Townson

=== Instruments ===
- Piano – Gabriel Yared
- Indian flute – Ashwin Srinivasan
- Reeds – Jan Hendrickse

=== Orchestra ===
- Orchestrators – Gabriel Yared, Jeff Atmajian
- Additional orchestrator – Kirsty Whalley
- Conductor – Jeff Atmajian
- Leader – Thomas Bowes
- Contractor – Isobel Griffiths
- Assistant contractor – Lucy Whalley

=== Management ===
- Music business affairs for 20th Century Fox – Tom Cavanaugh
- Executive in charge of music for 20th Century Fox – Robert Kraft
- Music supervisor for 20th Century Fox – Mike Knobloch

== Accolades ==
Award	Date of ceremony	Category	Recipients	Result	Ref.
Satellite Awards	December 20, 2009	Best Original Score	Gabriel Yared	Nominated	
