= The Monuments Men (soundtrack) =

The Monuments Men (Original Motion Picture Soundtrack)

Film score by Alexandre Desplat
- Released: February 4, 2014
- Recorded: October 22–23, 2013
- Studio: Abbey Road, London
- Genre: Film score
- Length: 60:32
- Label: Sony Classical
- Producer: Alexandre Desplat; Dominique Lemonnier

Alexandre Desplat chronology
Philomena (2013)	The Monuments Men (2014)	The Grand Budapest Hotel (2014)

The Monuments Men (Original Motion Picture Soundtrack) is the soundtrack to the 2014 film The Monuments Men directed by George Clooney. The film's musical score is composed by Alexandre Desplat and consists of a huge symphonic orchestral score, recorded within a short span of time. It was released through Sony Classical Records on February 4, 2014 to critical acclaim.

== Development ==
The Monuments Men is Desplat's second collaboration with Clooney as a director, after previously working on The Ides of March (2011). When Clooney offered him the script, Desplat felt excited as it reflected the scores of Maurice Jarre and Elmer Bernstein from the 1950s and 1960s, adding that Clooney wanted the film to reflect the timeline instead of making an epic war film. Hence, Desplat wanted to curate a narrative score that resembled war music, which consisted of "a big symphony orchestra that can go from a solid, masculine, brassy sound to a very intimate, solo flute and harp duet." Since, most of the classical war scores had been curated by symphonists who had the heritage of military bands and marches, brass music played an important role to the orchestral music. The score was recorded at the Abbey Road Studios in London, with Desplat conducting the 110-piece orchestra and was entirely recorded within 16 hours.

== Critical response ==
Calling it as a "delightful nostalgic score", Thomas Glorieux of Maintitles wrote "The Monuments Men is at times incredibly wonderful to listen to, a bit long, but a nostalgic enjoyable attempt nonetheless." Timothy Monger of AllMusic wrote "With dozens of film scores in a myriad of styles to his credit, Desplat is appropriately tasteful, adapting to a classic period style while still adding his own distinctive flourishes." Filmtracks.com wrote "Even if you don't find yourself in a position to enjoy this score for its affable retro styling alone, then at least you should be able to derive some pleasure from deconstructing it intellectually."

David Edelstein of New York called it as a "lighthearted marching-drum-and-woodwind score". Matt Zoller Seitz of RogerEbert.com called it as "alternately rousing and lyrical". Scott Foundas of Variety described it as "one of his most conventional scores" describing it as "a John Williams-esque Americana fanfare". Todd McCarthy of The Hollywood Reporter wrote "Alexandre Desplat's score is uncharacteristically sentimental." Peter Travers of Rolling Stone described it as "jaunty". Alonso Duralde of TheWrap called it as "vintage-sounding".

== Track listing ==
The Monuments Men (Original Motion Picture Soundtrack) track listing
No.	Title	Performer(s)	Length
1.	"The Roosevelt Mission"		1:20
2.	"Opening Titles"		2:38
3.	"Ghent Altarpiece"		2:38
4.	"Champagne"		1:00
5.	"Basic Training"		1:16
6.	"Normandy"		1:06
7.	"Deauville"		2:34
8.	"Stokes"		1:24
9.	"I See You, Stahl"		2:41
10.	"John Wayne"		2:17
11.	"Sniper"		2:35
12.	"Into Bruges"		1:52
13.	"The Letter"		3:17
14.	"The Nero Decree"		1:40
15.	"Stahl's Chalet"		0:52
16.	"Jean-Claude Dies"		3:30
17.	"Siegen Mine"		3:05
18.	"Claire & Granger"		3:28
19.	"Gold!"		1:29
20.	"Heilbronn Mine"		4:24
21.	"Castle Art Hoard"		2:02
22.	"Altaussee"		0:54
23.	"Finale"		9:18
24.	"End Credits"		1:08
25.	"Have Yourself a Merry Little Christmas"	Nora Sagal	2:04
Total length:			60:32

== Awards and nominations ==
Awards and nominations for The Monuments Men (Original Motion Picture Soundtrack)
Award	Date of ceremony	Category	Recipients and nominees	Result
World Soundtrack Awards	14 August 2014	Film Composer of the Year	Alexandre Desplat (Note: also for Godzilla, The Grand Budapest Hotel, Marius, Philomena, Venus in Fur, Zulu)	Won

== Personnel ==
Credits adapted from liner notes.

- Music composed and conducted by – Alexandre Desplat
- Music producers – Alexandre Desplat, Dominique Lemonnier
- Orchestra – London Symphony Orchestra
- Orchestration – Alexandre Desplat, Jean-Pascal Beintus, Nicolas Charron, Sylvain Morizet, William Ross
- Orchestra leader – Carmine Lauri
- Programming – Jongnic Bontemps, Romain Allender
- Recording – Peter Cobbin, Jonathan Allen, Simon Rhodes
- Mixing – Peter Cobbin
- Music editor – Gerard McCann
- Pro-tools operator – John Barrett
- Music co-ordinator – Xavier Forcioli
- Design – WLP Ltd.
