= Colette (soundtrack) =

2018 film soundtrack album

Colette (Original Motion Picture Soundtrack)

Film score by Thomas Adès
- Released: December 7, 2018
- Recorded: 2017–2018
- Studio: AIR Studios, London
- Genre: Film score
- Length: 40:17
- Label: Lakeshore
- Producer: Victor Olegovich Chaga

Colette (Original Motion Picture Soundtrack) is the film score to the 2018 biographical film Colette directed by Wash Westmoreland starring Keira Knightley as the eponymous French novelist. The original score is composed by British classical composer Thomas Adès and was recorded at the AIR Studios in London. The score was released through Lakeshore Records on December 7, 2018, and Adès won the Hollywood Music in Media Award for Best Original Score in an Independent Film and a nomination for the Satellite Award for Best Original Score.

== Development ==
British concert composer Thomas Adès contributed to the music for Colette, his first for a feature film. Westmoreland and Adès discussed about the music of Paris in the 1890s and 1900s, to which Adès replied it as one of the exciting periods in music history. Westmoreland who was intrigued with the response, asked Adès to be involved in the project to which the latter agreed. Adès then managed to utilize the material, themes and harmony in the context of 1890s and once beginning with the style, would focus on the drama and emotional contours of the story and each of the character's development musically.

Adès however felt the challenge being making music for the character and the world and not restricted to himself, which was much freeing to pare the music down to essentials to allow the film speak through it. Adès recalled that since his classical work deals with often an intense, obsessive focus on details of harmony, composing the film provided him an opportunity to focus down even closer to reveal the possible emotional truth of the moment. Colette's character had several musical motifs and themes, often voiced by the harp—when the young Colette remembers or experiences something—and through piano—when she re-creates the same experience, writing and thinking about it as it becomes part of the art. Colette's husband Willy's motif utilizes the French horn while her friend and lover Missy's motif is played on the clarinet.

Adès wrote his version of the "Dream of Egypt" when performed on stage by Colette and Missy in 1907, that caused a riot when the two lovers kissed. Adès recalled on Westmoreland needed the piece the following week for shooting, which he realized that he was not in Kansas anymore, and felt that in the opera world it would be at least two or three years. Adès recalled that he had "real fun" composing that piece, as he felt this being a moment on hearing the eruption of 20th century and birth of modernism happening, which led him to have the slight edge musically.

The hour-long score featured only 40 minutes in the album. Adès played piano and conducted with a small ensemble of 15 musicians. The score was written over two months in New York in late 2017, when he was conducting "The Exterminating Angel" at the Metropolitan Opera. Adès also chose most of the period classical works and arranged pieces by Claude Debussy ("Arabesques"), Erik Satie ("Gnossienne No 1 Lent") and Camille Saint-Saëns ("Septet in E-flat major (Op. 65) IV") for this film.

== Reception ==
Jonathan Broxton of Movie Music UK wrote "Colette is a really beautiful piece of music filled with sublime orchestral textures and gorgeous instrumental combinations, anchored by a strong and memorable main theme. It will absolutely appeal to those whose tastes in film music tend to veer towards the traditionally classical, especially anyone with an affinity for the joie de vivre of music from 19th century France. As a film music debut for Thomas Adès, Colette is very impressive indeed, and I sincerely hope he graces us with more soundtrack commissions in the future." Adrian Edwards of Gramophone wrote "All this music is lovingly played by a group of hand-picked musicians, led by Jacqueline Shave, in homage to a lady who was an iconoclast of her age, newly minted for our time by Adès."

Peter Debruge of Variety wrote "one of the film's strongest assets is its score, the first written expressly for the screen by British opera composer Thomas Adès, and the source of so much of what audiences perceive as Colette's sparkling intellect. The entire movie seems brighter by dint of Adès' nimble piano and alert string work, propelling us forward through so many elegantly photographed, Merchant-Ivory like scenes in which stuffy snobs stand around in expensive waistcoats." Andrea Long Chu of 4 Columns wrote "A seasoned composer of orchestral and choral music here scoring his first film, Thomas Adès fully delivers, especially in his waltzes: a dark and decadent one for the salon scenes, and another with an earnest, childlike theme that I whistled all the way home."

Critc based at The Victoria Advocate wrote "Thomas Adès beautiful score captures the romance of the era". John Anderson of The Wall Street Journal wrote "The sense of epoch is enhanced by the use of period music—Debussy, Satie, Saint-Saëns—along with Thomas Adès's original score." Critic based at East London and West Essex Guardian wrote "British composer Thomas Ades' orchestrations underscore the hard fought battle for parity and respect."

== Track listing ==
No.	Title	Writer(s)	Length
1.	"Snow Globe"		2:58
2.	"Willy's Arrival"		1:12
3.	"Valse Du Salon"		3:36
4.	"Willy Finds the Manuscripts"		0:43
5.	"Etching Montage"		1:23
6.	"The Lake"		1:17
7.	"These are the Copses"		1:30
8.	"Septet in E-flat major (Op. 65) IV"	Camille Saint-Saëns	2:04
9.	"Claudine a L'Ecole Print"		1:01
10.	"Claudine a Paris"		1:04
11.	"Arrival at the Theatre"		0:41
12.	"Dream of Egypt"		2:05
13.	"Anger by the Seine"		0:42
14.	"Polaire's Arrival"		1:05
15.	"Jules Colette Burial"		1:08
16.	"Gnossienne No 1 Lent"	Erik Satie	0:47
17.	"Lost Your Touch"		1:35
18.	"Still Need Your Headmaster"		1:15
19.	"Missy and Colette"		1:04
20.	"Claudines Are Everywhere"		1:01
21.	"Arabesque"	Claude Debussy	2:21
22.	"Colette Is Free"		1:24
23.	"Flesh"		1:08
24.	"La Vagabonde"		1:07
25.	"Colette's Journey"		1:57
26.	"Colette"		4:09
Total length:			40:17

== Personnel ==
Credits adapted from liner notes:

- Music composer, conductor, piano – Thomas Adès
- Orchestrators – Thomas Adès, Anthony Weeden
- Orchestra leader – Jacquie Shave
- Orchestra contractor – Lucy Whalley
- Music producer, programmer, editor – Victor Olegovich Chaga
- Pro-tools recordist – Adam Miller
- Recording and mixing – Nick Wollage
- Technical assistance – Ashley Andrew-Jones
- Executive producer – Brian McNelis, Skip Williamson
- Score coordinator – Catherine Grieves
- Copyist – Anthony Weeden
- A&R – Eric Craig
- Art direction – John Bergin

== Accolades ==
Award	Date of ceremony	Category	Recipient(s)	Result	Ref.
Hollywood Music in Media Awards	November 14, 2018	Best Original Score — Independent Film	Thomas Adès	Won	
Satellite Awards	February 22, 2019	Best Original Score	Thomas Adès	Nominated	
