= The Irishman (soundtrack) =

2019 soundtrack album by Various Artists

The Irishman (Original Motion Picture Soundtrack)

Soundtrack album by various artists
- Released: November 1, 2019
- Studios: Abbey Road Studios, London
- Genre: Film soundtrack
- Length: 60:13
- Labels: Maisie Music Publishing; Sony Music Entertainment; Netflix
- Compilers: Robbie Robertson; Randall Poster

The Irishman (Original Motion Picture Soundtrack) is the soundtrack album to the 2019 film The Irishman directed by Martin Scorsese. The film score is written and composed by Scorsese's frequent collaborator Robbie Robertson, who also compiled the soundtrack with music supervisor Randall Poster. It features both original and existing music tracks. Sony Music Entertainment released the soundtrack digitally on November 1, 2019, and through physical formats on November 29. In addition, a vinyl edition album which was specially cut at Abbey Road Studios, London was released on February 7, 2020.

== Development ==
"The film spans many decades, and we had song ideas that we wanted to use for the different periods. When we started breaking it down into time periods, it all grew from there. We also started thinking about what would work as counterpoint, or what would not be the obvious choice. That’s where we started, and when it came time to figure out the score, Marty said, 'Rule number one is that it can’t sound like movie music.' [...] That eliminated a lot of possibilities, so I had to go to a musical headspace that I had never been before. It works beautifully in the movie."

— Robbie Robertson on compiling the soundtrack for The Irishman in an interview with Vulture.

Speaking to Rolling Stone, Robertson said, "This is probably the tenth film I've worked on with Marty [Scorsese], and every time we do it, it's a whole new experience ... The music score for The Irishman was an unusual feat. We were trying to discover a sound, a mood, a feel, that could work, over the many decades that this story takes place." Robertson also wrote the score for the film, although only his "Theme for the Irishman" appears on the soundtrack. Two tracks Robertson wrote for the film that appear in the credits, "I Hear You Paint Houses" and "Remembrance" featuring Frederic Yonnet on the diatonic harmonica, were earlier included on his studio album Sinematic, which released on the same year in September.

== Track listing ==
The Irishman (Original Motion Picture Soundtrack)
No.	Title	Artist(s)	Length
1.	"In the Still of the Night"	The Five Satins	3:05
2.	"Tuxedo Junction"	Glenn Miller and His Orchestra	3:26
3.	"I Hear You Knockin'"	Smiley Lewis	2:45
4.	"The Fat Man"	Fats Domino	2:36
5.	"El Negro Zumbón" (from the motion picture Anna)	Flo Sandon's	2:29
6.	"Le Grisbi"	Jean Wetzel	3:26
7.	"Delicado"	Percy Faith and His Orchestra	2:53
8.	"Have I Sinned"	Donnie Elbert	2:59
9.	"Theme for the Irishman"	Robbie Robertson ft Frederic Yonnet (harmonica)	4:36
10.	"Song of the Barefoot Contessa"	Hugo Winterhalter and His Orchestra	2:39
11.	"A White Sport Coat (And a Pink Carnation)"	Marty Robbins (feat. Ray Conniff)	2:31
12.	"Canadian Sunset" (Single Version)	Eddie Heywood & Hugo Winterhalter and His Orchestra	2:55
13.	"Honky Tonk, Pt. 1"	Bill Doggett	3:05
14.	"Melancholy Serenade"	Jackie Gleason	3:15
15.	"Qué Rico el Mambo"	Pérez Prado	3:58
16.	"Cry"	Johnnie Ray & The Four Lads	3:04
17.	"Sleep Walk"	Santo & Johnny	2:27
18.	"The Time Is Now"	The Golddiggers	2:03
19.	"Al di là"	Jerry Vale & The Latin Casino All Stars	3:18
20.	"Pretend You Don't See Her"	The Latin Casino All Stars	2:42
Total length:			60:13

== Charts ==
Chart (2019)	Peak position
UK Compilation Albums (OCC)	48
UK Independent Albums (OCC)	34
UK Digital Albums (OCC)	47
UK Soundtrack Albums (OCC)	39
US Billboard 200	80
US Independent Albums (Billboard)	23
US Soundtrack Albums (Billboard)	19

== Release history ==
Region	Date	Format(s)	Label	Version(s)	Catalog Code(s)	Ref.
Worldwide	November 1, 2019	Digital download; streaming	Maisie Music; Sony Music	Standard	—N/a	
Europe	November 29, 2019	CD	Maisie Music; Sony Music	Compilation	19075969472	
Japan	December 27, 2019	CD	Sony Classical	Compilation	SICP 6249	
Japan	January 3, 2020	CD	Sony Music Entertainment Japan	Sampler	SDCI-82576	
US	February 7, 2020	Vinyl	Maisie Music; Masterworks; Netflix	Deluxe	19075969471	
Europe	February 7, 2020	Vinyl	Maisie Music; Masterworks; Netflix	Deluxe	19075969471	

== Accolades ==
In December 2019, IndieWire reported that Robertson would be ineligible for an Oscar nomination for his original music used in the film (along with Captain Marvel and Knives Out) due to the presence of too many high-profile hit singles featured in the film's soundtrack. Robertson was however nominated for Original Score awards at the Critics' Choice and Satellite Awards respectively.

Award	Date of ceremony	Category	Recipient(s)	Result	Ref.
Critics' Choice Movie Awards	January 12, 2020	Best Score	Robbie Robertson	Nominated	
Satellite Awards	December 19, 2019	Best Original Score	Robbie Robertson	Nominated	
