= Philomena (soundtrack) =

Philomena (Original Motion Picture Soundtrack)

Soundtrack album by Alexandre Desplat
- Released: 25 October 2013
- Genre: Film score
- Length: 51:16
- Label: Decca
- Producer: Alexandre Desplat

Alexandre Desplat chronology
Venus in Fur (2013)	Philomena (Original Motion Picture Soundtrack) (2013)	The Monuments Men (2014)

Philomena (Original Motion Picture Soundtrack) is the score album composed by Alexandre Desplat to the 2013 film of the same name directed by Stephen Frears, released on 25 October 2013 through Decca Records. The score received positive response from critics, and led him a nomination for Academy Award for Best Original Score and Satellite Award for Best Original Score.

== Development ==
"Philomena Lee, in both the movie and in life, is a person who's very strong but at the same time doesn't show it — you can feel it if you get close to her, you can feel a great strength and a great dignity. [It was] very difficult to score because of that because I was worried that I would hurt — that I would be intruding, that I would be in the way."

— Alexandre Desplat

Philomena marked Desplat's fourth collaboration with Stephen Frears, after The Queen (2006), Chéri (2009) and Tamara Drewe (2010). Desplat recalled that he loved the Italian comedy-dramas from the 1960s, particularly those directed by Ettore Scola, as it would have deep subjects treated with sense of humour, that makes them even stronger. The film had the duality as with Frears' previous films where the tragedy is strong, but also have a distant wit, adding "There's this balance between drama and comedy. It's always a better way of delivering a message, whether it's political or social."

Desplat found the film "very difficult" to score as the real Philomena Lee (the character which the film is based on) is a woman of "great strength and dignity" and wanted to honor her as well as his on-screen character (played by Judi Dench in the film). So he wanted something simple in melody and in range to symbolize the feeling of restraint that comes across the film. He was specifically inspired by the fairground moment in her story, that served as the catalyst for the film. Praising Dench's performance, Desplat added that "She gives so much doing nothing that the music has to respect that. If [the music] plays, it has to be so subtle" while further adding that his score guided the audience "to open windows, emphasize things that you might feel even more, and sometimes just pull back, leave the actors alone and respect the dialogue."

Desplat orchestrated the melody echoing the sound of fair organ using recorders, bass clarinets, strings, and harmonics, that gives an "eerie and haunting sound" as this music was "ghosting her" and further continued "This [melody] is reminding her of what happened and the pain and the loss and actually reminding us, the audience, to share in the pain and the tragedy." He added the orchestration is just as important as the melody and wanted to ensure that the size of orchestra should not overwhelm the melodies. The theme for Philomena was written within two days, was considered as "both melancholic and joyful".

== Track listing ==
No.	Title	Length
1.	"Philomena"	02:53
2.	"Martin"	01:38
3.	"Birth"	03:00
4.	"Laundry"	01:59
5.	"Adoption"	03:37
6.	"Drives to Roscrea"	01:15
7.	"Reminiscence"	01:48
8.	"Airport"	03:11
9.	"Landing in USA"	01:35
10.	"Discovering Michael"	04:52
11.	"Mary"	01:56
12.	"Confession"	05:48
13.	"Memories"	01:16
14.	"No Thought of Ireland"	02:07
15.	"Quiet Time, To Pete's"	03:36
16.	"Anthony's Story"	03:25
17.	"Sister Hildegarde"	03:14
18.	"Farewell"	02:48
19.	"Fairground Carousel"	01:08
Total length:		51:16

== Reception ==
Mfiles wrote "The music is both of a piece with the rest of Desplat's career yet fresh and engaging enough to stand on its own – moving without being syrupy, yet emotional enough not to feel detached. Desplat's Oscar nomination (his sixth) is well deserved; but more important than that is the way in which he continues to prove himself as one of the most distinctive film composers to have emerged in recent years." James Southall of Movie Wave wrote "Philomena is no exception – this is music with a whimsical air, a clever nostalgic charm thanks to its chimes and piano that forever seem to be leading the listener towards a welcoming place. No Hollywood schmaltz here – it's hard to imagine Desplat doing schmaltz – it's all blessed with a wonderful touch of class. There's real feeling, too – an emotional underbelly to the music that cleverly develops over the course of the score."

Music critic Jonathan Broxton wrote "Philomena is a comparatively lightweight score in the wider context of Alexandre Desplat's career, but having been largely absent from mainstream scoring projects since Argo and Zero Dark Thirty a year ago, its nice to hear from him again. While the themes are not immediately memorable, Philomena more than makes up for this with plenty of appropriate emotion, beautiful textures and orchestrations, and sensible and intelligent application of the thematic material that is there. If Philomena ends up being a popular hit with Academy voters in other categories I can see Desplat sneaking in with an Oscar nomination on Judi Dench and Steve Coogan's coat tails; otherwise, it's a pleasant reminder of the fact that Desplat remains one of the most interesting and uniquely-voiced composers working today." Mentioning it as "one of the best film scores of 2013", Bobby Finger of The Atlantic wrote "A perfectly lovely, waltzy, almost lullaby-ish score. But not as memorable as Desplat when he's at his best."

== Accolades ==
Award	Date of ceremony	Category	Recipients and nominees	Result
Academy Awards	2 March 2014	Best Original Score	Alexandre Desplat	Nominated
Satellite Awards	23 February 2014	Best Original Score	Alexandre Desplat	Nominated
World Soundtrack Awards	14 August 2014	Film Composer of the Year	Alexandre Desplat (Note: also for Godzilla, The Grand Budapest Hotel, Marius, The Monuments Men, Philomena, Venus in Fur, Zulu)	Won
