= Scott George =

Native American singer and drummer

- Born: 1957 or 1958 (age 68–69); Kansas, United States
- Children: Wynema Hamilton,Edward George

Scott George is a Native American singer, drummer, and composer of the Osage Nation. He was nominated for an Academy Award for Best Original Song for his song "Wahzhazhe (A Song for My People)" from Killers of the Flower Moon (2023).

== Life and career ==
George was born in Kansas and raised in Hominy, Oklahoma. As of 2024, he has spent 30 years working in tribal housing, including a decade as director of the Citizen Potawatomi Nation's housing department. He began singing at age 16 and has sung in I'n-Lon-Schka drum committees since 1983. He began composing his own music in 2000, mostly in the Ponca language.

Director Martin Scorsese and actors Leonardo DiCaprio and Lily Gladstone attended the Osage Nation's annual I'n-Lon-Schka dances in June 2021 and wanted to capture the energy of the dance for the conclusion of their film Killers of the Flower Moon (2023). Vann Bighorse, a consultant on the film, contacted George and Kenny Bighorse to compose a song for the film's ending. The three men decided against using existing traditional music and instead opted to compose new songs in the Osage language. They presented two pieces to Scorsese; the chosen piece was given the name "Wahzhazhe (A Song for My People)". The song was nominated for Best Original Song at the 96th Academy Awards, making George the first Osage nominated for an Academy Award and the first indigenous person nominated for Best Original Song.
