= Soul Surfer (soundtrack) =

Soundtrack to 2011 film

Soul Surfer (Music From The Motion Picture)

Soundtrack album by Various artists
- Released: April 5, 2011
- Genre: Film soundtrack
- Length: 36:24
- Label: Rhino Records

Soul Surfer (Music From The Motion Picture) is the soundtrack to the 2011 film Soul Surfer, released on April 5, 2011 by Rhino Records. The album featured numerous songs performed by artists James “Bla” Pahinui, Michael Franti & Spearhead, Britt Nicole, Brian Setzer and Two Door Cinema Club.

It also had two original recordings written for the film: an original song "Runaway" by Mat Kearney and a cover of Katy Perry's 2010 hit single "Firework" by American Idol finalist Chris Sligh. Mat Kearney claimed that he met Bethany Hamilton (whom the film is based) in Hawaii, before the accident and impressed with her and when the film's biopic was under production, Keaney was offered to write a song from the production's music staff, thereby leading his track "Runaway" being made into the final soundtrack. The musical choices were supervised by Hamilton's family.

== Reception ==
James Christopher Monger of AllMusic called it as "a pleasant mix of alternative rock, CCM, teen pop, and a little slack key Hawaiian music tossed in for good measure."

== Track listing ==
No.	Title	Artist(s)	Length
1.	"The Sound Of Sunshine" (album version)	Michael Franti & Spearhead	3:45
2.	"This Is The Life"	Two Door Cinema Club	3:30
3.	"Like A Star"	Britt Nicole	3:53
4.	"Ho' Oheno Keia No Beauty"	James "Bla" Pahinui	2:56
5.	"Runaway"	Mat Kearney	3:51
6.	"Go-Go Godzilla"	Brian Setzer	3:37
7.	"It's Your Life" (album)	Francesca Battistelli	2:51
8.	"The Unknown"	Athlete	4:42
9.	"Set The World On Fire"	Britt Nicole	3:36
10.	"Firework"	Chris Sligh	3:43
Total length:			36:24

== Original score ==
Soul Surfer (Original Motion Picture Score)

Film score by Marco Beltrami
- Released: April 5, 2011
- Genre: Film score
- Length: 45:35
- Label: Madison Gate Records
- Producer: Marco Beltrami

Soul Surfer (Original Motion Picture Score) is the score album to the film composed by Marco Beltrami and released on April 5, 2011 by Madison Gate Records.

=== Track listing ===
No.	Title	Length
1.	"Main Titles From Soul Surfer"	2:34
2.	"Turtle Bay Surfing"	2:12
3.	"Fireworks"	0:35
4.	"Shark Attack"	6:22
5.	"Alana Visits Bethany"	1:18
6.	"Homecoming"	1:59
7.	"Dark Day"	3:38
8.	"Back in the Water"	2:38
9.	"Trying to Get Out"	2:03
10.	"Bethany and Dad"	2:21
11.	"Phuket"	1:20
12.	"Half Pint Boards"	2:53
13.	"Humn for Bethany"	2:24
14.	"Welcome to Nationals"	1:28
15.	"Big Drum Competition"	3:09
16.	"Paddle Battle"	1:51
17.	"Bethany's Wave"	3:26
18.	"Awards"	1:59
19.	"Bethany Gives Thanks"	1:25
Total length:		45:35

=== Reception ===
Filmtracks.com wrote "Like Christopher Young's Priest from the same period of time, Soul Surfer is a score that merits the expenditure. You rarely hear a score with so many integrated facets, all of them successful. "
