= The Martian (soundtrack) =

Motion picture soundtrack album

The Martian is the 2015 science fiction film based on Andy Weir's 2011 novel of the same name directed by Ridley Scott. Two soundtrack albums for the film were released by Columbia Records on October 2, 2015. The first album titled The Martian: Original Motion Picture Score, features instrumental tracks from the original score composed and conducted by Harry Gregson-Williams, and the latter, featured incorporated songs used in the film, that was released as a separate album under the title Songs from The Martian. The music served as a "comic relief" to provide sarcasm where most of the songs are chosen and performed ironically.

This film marked the fourth collaboration between Gregson-Williams and Scott, the former worked on Kingdom of Heaven (2005), Prometheus (2012) and Exodus: Gods and Kings, composing the main film score for the first and last films, and doing additional music for the other two. Williams said that, the score would be mostly hybrid, but also being "epic" and "large" in terms of scale, while the film tells about a man's survival. A deluxe edition combining both the film score and the soundtrack, were released in digital and physical formats on November 6.

== Original soundtrack ==
Songs from The Martian

Soundtrack album by various artists
- Released: October 2, 2015
- Genre: Disco; pop
- Length: 33:06
- Label: Columbia

=== Track listing ===
No.	Title	Artist(s)	Length
1.	"Turn the Beat Around"	Vicki Sue Robinson	3:24
2.	"Hot Stuff"	Donna Summer	5:12
3.	"Rock the Boat"	The Hues Corporation	3:19
4.	"Don't Leave Me This Way"	Thelma Houston	3:37
5.	"Starman"	David Bowie	4:14
6.	"Waterloo"	ABBA	2:46
7.	"Love Train"	The O'Jays	2:58
8.	"I Will Survive"	Gloria Gaynor	3:17
9.	"The Martian Score Suite"	Harry Gregson-Williams	4:19
Total length:			33:06

Notes

- A running gag in the film is commander Melissa Lewis's love for 1970s songs (especially of the disco genre, which apparently Watney hates), the only music available to Watney on Mars which often appears as diegetic music.
- A track titled "All Along the Watchtower", performed by Jimi Hendrix and Bob Dylan, was played in the film, but was not included in the soundtrack.

=== Reception ===
Critics noted the use of 70's disco music in the film being compiled into a soundtrack, would bring a prominent response, similar to the soundtrack of Guardians of the Galaxy (2014). Johny Brayson of Bustle said "The Martian soundtrack reflects Watney's struggle, and by the time you leave the theater, you'll have heard enough '70s hits to last a lifetime." Megan Garner of The Atlantic wrote "the music of The Martian becomes a metaphor not just for an exploratory approach to the cosmos—space, the final frontier and all that—but for a colonial one". Matt Zoeller Seitz, in his review for RogerEbert.com felt that the musical choices "make Mark's predicament seem like an elevated version of a tedious but necessary task, like tiling a roof or repainting a garage. Hard work always seems to go faster when you put some tunes on." IndieWire ranked it as one among the "30 Best Film Soundtracks of 2015".

== Original score ==
The Martian: Original Motion Picture Score

Film score by Harry Gregson-Williams
- Released: October 2, 2015
- Studio: Abbey Road Studios, London
- Genre: Film score
- Length: 33:06
- Label: Columbia
- Producer: Harry Gregson-Williams

Harry Gregson-Williams chronology
Monkey Kingdom (2015)	The Martian (2015)	Miss You Already (2015)

=== Background ===
After providing additional music for Exodus: Gods and Kings (2014), Scott asked Gregson-Williams to read the script of The Martian, confirming his involvement. He was involved in the project, four weeks before the film entered post-production, and Scott supervised the film in the editing room, and was further amazed by the "tight and innovative" writing, performances, and the "perfectly executed" edit which thought of him as "a charm to work on a film where three moons are aligned". They discussed about the textures, sounds and colors of the music might provide and the emotional arc of the film.

Gregson-Williams, however had certain challenges geographically, as most of the film's story set in Mars and had to find a character, in which he would serve as a "monster" metaphorically, and that approach would counter what they were really after, where Mars had the austerity to it, being calming and spacious, and there had been hints of danger and malevolence because Mars will kill him if he puts a foot wrong.

The score had plenty of long notes, which were not in hurry at most of the times. It was further being a hybrid score, of epic and large in scale, but at its heart, it depicts about Watney's (Matt Damon) survival. The thematic material attached to him progresses and evolves throughout his journey, that starts very bleak, but his character was quite optimistic and humorous. Gregson-Williams wanted to track his ups and downs musically. On writing his theme, he found a "more personal sound" that accompanied his monologues and required him to go deeper into it. He used arpeggiated synth sounds which could accompany a piano or similar instruments, but as the film progressed and his tasks became more grander, so as the music. He recorded a large orchestra and choir at Abbey Road Studios in London.

=== Track listing ===
No.	Title	Length
1.	"Mars"	2:25
2.	"Emergency Launch"	3:09
3.	"Making Water"	2:38
4.	"Spotting Movement"	1:49
5.	"Science the S*** Out of This"	2:16
6.	"Messages from Hermes"	3:31
7.	"Sprouting Potatoes"	1:39
8.	"Watney's Alive!"	2:46
9.	"Pathfinder"	2:33
10.	"Hexadecimals"	2:33
11.	"Crossing Mars"	3:36
12.	"Reap & Sow"	2:21
13.	"Crops Are Dead"	3:26
14.	"Work The Problem"	1:57
15.	"See You In A Few"	5:11
16.	"Build a Bomb"	5:06
17.	"Fly Like Iron Man"	4:45
Total length:		51:49

=== Reception ===
Music critic Jonathan Broxton wrote "Although The Martian might not have the crowd-pleasing overt heroism of something like an Apollo 13, and may disappoint listeners looking for that sort of score, I personally think Harry Gregson-Williams interpreted Ridley Scott's vision perfectly. The electronic ideas capture its scientific backbone in terms of the film's celebration of intellect and ingenuity, and pays homage to its classic sci-fi outlook." James Southall of Movie Wave wrote "The Martian is smart music, cleverly conceived and like all good film music there's a great dramatic impetus to it on the album, a clear course being travelled." Pete Simons of Synchrotones called it as "a very stylish score with each cue feeling like a nicely rounded piece of music. The composer effortlessly mixes orchestral and synthesized textures to create a very human, yet very alien atmosphere. It suits the film to the ground, and makes for a beautiful, new age-type album."

== Accolades ==
Award / Film Festival	Category	Recipient(s)	Result	Ref(s)
Empire Awards	Best Soundtrack		Nominated	
Hollywood Music in Media Awards	Best Original Score in a Sci-Fi/Fantasy Film	Ridley Scott	Nominated	
Motion Picture Sound Editors	Best Sound Editing – Music in Feature Film	Tony Lewis, Richard Whitfield	Nominated	
Satellite Awards	Best Music	Harry Gregson-Williams	Nominated	
St. Louis Film Critics Association	Best Soundtrack		Nominated	
