= Black Machine =

Italian band

- Origin: Italy
- Genres: Electronic, dance
- Years active: 1991–present
- Labels: PLM Records; New Music International; London; Carrere
- Members: Marius Percali; Pippo Landro; Ottorino Menardi

Black Machine is an Italian electronic music group, who were most active throughout the 1990s. They are best known for the singles "How Gee", "Funky Funky People" and "Jazz Machine", all of which charted in several countries across Europe.

In 1992, "How Gee" peaked at No. 45 in France and No. 32 in the Netherlands, with "Funky Funky People" and "Jazz Machine (Remix)" also charting in the top 40 of the Dutch Single Top 100, both reaching No. 38. "Funky Funky People" was a top 20 hit in Austria, peaking at No. 18. "How Gee" was most successful in the United Kingdom, where it reached No. 17 in April 1994. It also reached No. 37 on the U.S. Billboard Hot Dance Club Play chart. The song was also featured in the 2021 film House of Gucci.

== Discography ==
=== Albums ===
- The Album (1992)
- Love 'N' Peace (1993)

Compilations

- Double Mix (1991)
- Double Mix (1993)

=== Singles ===
- "How Gee" (1991) – UK #17, NETH #32, FRA #45, U.S. Dance #37
- "Jazz Machine" (1992) – NETH #38
- "Funky Funky People" (1992) – AUT #18, NETH #38
- "Get Funky" (1993)
- "Love 'N' Peace" (1993)
- "U Make Me Come a Life" (1995)
- "Jump Up" (1996)
- "Thinkin' About You" (1997)
- "Funky Banana" (1999)
- "One, Two, Three, Four (How Gee)" (as Black Machine 2005) (2005)
- "How Gee (25th Anniversary)" (2018)
