= Salt (soundtrack) =

Salt (Original Motion Picture Soundtrack)

Film score by James Newton Howard
- Released: July 20, 2010
- Recorded: 2010
- Genre: Contemporary classical
- Length: 59:10
- Label: Madison Gate
- Producer: James Newton Howard

James Newton Howard chronology
| The Last Airbender (2010) | Salt (Original Motion Picture Soundtrack) (2010) | Inhale (2010) |

Salt (Original Motion Picture Soundtrack) is the soundtrack to the 2010 film Salt. The film's original score is composed by James Newton Howard and released through Madison Gate Records through iTunes on July 20, 2010, and physically as an on-demand CD-R from Amazon.com on August 10, 2010.

== Development ==
Salt is Howard's maiden collaboration with Noyce. Howard described it as a "state-of-the-art" score which was a mixture of orchestra and electronic music. The instrumentation consisted of drums and other percussion elements, along with the orchestral accompaniment. Describing the complexity of the film's score, he recalled a sequence where Jolie meets her husband Mike Krause (August Diehl), where he wrote a piece of music that described it as a "fantasy, magical" moment energized on Krause's quality and building their relationship. The song "Orlov's Story" includes a Russian lullaby that music editor Joe E. Rand found at Amoeba Music, and which served as inspiration for the choir heard in other tracks – but the chants in the rest of the score are only random syllables, as Rand and Howard thought actual Russian words would be a spoil about Salt's allegiance.

== Reception ==
Thomas Glorieux of Maintitles described it as a "overlong action exercise of James Newton Howard". Filmtracks.com wrote "Salt is a functional but not spectacular score with a few notable highlights." Jordan Raup of The Film Stage wrote "the score, by James Newton Howard, features heavy guitars anytime Jolie does something bad-ass." Kirk Honeycutt of The Hollywood Reporter and Justin Chang of Variety described the score as "nerve-teasing" and "topnotch". Lisa Kennedy of The Denver Post called it as "propulsive". In contrast, A. O. Scott of The New York Times criticized it as "loud and empty".

== Track listing ==
All tracks are written by James Newton Howard.

Salt (Original Motion Picture Soundtrack) track listing
| No. | Title | Length |
|---|---|---|
| 1. | "Prisoner Exchange" | 4:09 |
| 2. | "Escaping the CIA" | 5:20 |
| 3. | "Cornered" | 1:09 |
| 4. | "Orlov's Story" | 4:43 |
| 5. | "Chase Across DC" | 6:51 |
| 6. | "Hotel Room Preparations/Parade" | 3:59 |
| 7. | "Attack on St. Bart's Cathedral" | 3:10 |
| 8. | "A Dark Goddamn Hole" | 1:47 |
| 9. | "Taser Puppet" | 1:34 |
| 10. | "You Are My Greatest Creation" | 4:13 |
| 11. | "Destiny" | 2:22 |
| 12. | "Barge Apocalypse" | 2:26 |
| 13. | "Day X" | 1:37 |
| 14. | "I'm Going Home" | 2:16 |
| 15. | "Eight Floors Down" | 2:51 |
| 16. | "Arming the Football" | 2:11 |
| 17. | "Not Safe with Me" | 2:27 |
| 18. | "You're About to Become Famous" | 1:38 |
| 19. | "Mano a Mano" | 1:51 |
| 20. | "Garroted" | 3:32 |
| 21. | "Go Get Em" | 3:10 |
| Total length: | | 59:10 |

== Personnel ==
Credits adapted from CD liner notes.

- Music composer and producer – James Newton Howard
- Co-producer and arranger – Stuart Michael Thomas
- Programming – Rob Persaud, Stuart Michael Thomas
- Recording – Shawn Murphy
- Digital recordist – Adam Michalak
- Mixing – Joel Iwataki
- Mixing assistance – Matt Ward
- Music editor – Joe E. Rand
- Assistant music editor – Steven R. Galloway
- Auricle control systems – Richard Grant
- Pro-tools operator – Erik Swanson
- Soundtrack co-ordinator – Tim Ahlering
- Music co-ordinator – Pamela Sollie
- Executive producer – Lorenzo Di Bonaventura
- Art direction – Elizabeth Prochnow

Orchestra

- Orchestra – The Hollywood Studio Symphony
- Orchestrations – Conrad Pope, Jeff Atmajian, John Ashton Thomas, Jon Kull, Marcus Trumpp, Pete Anthony
- Orchestra conductor – Pete Anthony
- Orchestra contractor – Peter Rotter, Sandy DeCrescent
- Orchestra leader – Roger Wilkie
- Music preparation – Joann Kane Music Service, Mark Graham
- Scoring crew – David Marquette, Greg Loskorn, Jay Selvester, Mark Eshelman

Instruments

- Bass – Bruce Morgenthaler, Christian Kollgaard, David Parmeter, Drew Dembowski, Edward Meares, Michael Valerio, Neil Garber, Nico Abondolo, Nico Philippon, Oscar Hidalgo
- Bassoon – Allen Savedoff, Judy Farmer, Ken Munday, Michael O'Donovan, Rose Corrigan
- Cello – Andrew Shulman, Anthony Cooke, Armen Ksajikian, Cecelia Tsan, Chris Ermacoff, Dane Little, David Speltz, Dennis Karmazyn, Erika Duke, Kim Scholes, John Walz, Jonathan Karoly, Paul Cohen, Paula Hochhalter, Steve Erdody, Timothy Landauer, Trevor Handy
- Clarinet – Ben Lulich, Donald Foster, Gary Bovyer, Ralph Williams, Steve Roberts, Stuart Clark
- Flute – Dave Shostac, Geraldine Rotella, Heather Clark, Jenni Olson, James Walker
- Guitar – George Doering, Michael Landau
- Harp – Ellie Choate, Gayle Levant, Marcia Dickstein
- Horn – Brian O'Connor, Daniel Kelley, Dave Everson, James Thatcher, Jenny Kim, Laura Brenes, Mark Adams, Paul Klintworth, Phillip Yao, Richard Todd, Steve Becknell
- Oboe – Barbara Northcutt, Jessica Pearlman, Leslie Reed, Tom Boyd
- Percussion – Alan Estes, Robert Zimmitti, Michael Fisher, Peter Limonick
- Piano and celesta – Randy Kerber
- Trombone – Andy Malloy, Bill Reichenbach, George Thatcher, Bill Booth
- Trumpet – Jon Lewis, Malcolm McNab, Tim Morrison
- Tuba – Doug Tornquist, Jim Self
- Viola – Aaron Oltman, Alma Fernandez, Andrew Duckles, Brian Dembow, Carrie Castillo, Carrie Holzman, Darrin McCann, David Walther, Denyse Buffum, Gina Coletti, Jennie Hansen, Karie Prescott, Katie Kadarauch, Keith Greene, Luke Maurer, Marlow Fisher, Matthew Funes, Mike Nowak, Pamela Jacobson, Pam Goldsmith, Rob Brophy, Roland Kato, Scott Hosfeld, Shawn Mann, Steven Gordon, Thomas Diener, Vickie Miskolczy
- Violin – Aimee Kreston, Alan Grunfeld, Alyssa Park, Amy Hershberger, Ana Landauer, Armen Anassian, Bruce Dukov, Darius Campo, Dimitrie Leivici, Elizabeth Hedman, Elizabeth Johnson, Endre Granat, Eun Mee Ahn, Haim Shtrum, Henry Gronnier, Irina Voloshina, Jackie Brand, Jay Rosen, Jeanne Skrocki, Josefina Vergara, Julie Gigante, Katia Popov, Kenneth Yerke, Kevin Connolly, Lisa Sutton, Marc Sazer, Miran Kojian, Miwako Watanabe, Natalie Leggett, Neil Samples, Nina Evtuhov, Phillip Levy, Radu Pieptea, Rafael Rishik, Richard Altenbach, Roger Wilkie, Sara Parkins, Sarah Schwartz, Sarah Thornblade, Searmi Park, Serena McKinney, Tammy Hatwan, Tereza Stanislav
