= BlacKkKlansman (soundtrack) =

2018 soundtrack album by Terence Blanchard

BlacKkKlansman (Original Motion Picture Soundtrack)

Soundtrack album by Terence Blanchard
- Released: August 10, 2018
- Studio: Sony Pictures Soundstage (Los Angeles)
- Length: 37:46
- Label: Back Lot Music

BlacKkKlansman (Original Motion Picture Soundtrack) is the soundtrack album composed by Terence Blanchard for the 2018 film BlacKkKlansman. It was released by Back Lot Music on August 10, 2018, the same day as the film's theatrical release.

== Background ==
Composer Terence Blanchard had been a longtime collaborator of director Spike Lee, scoring Lee's films from Jungle Fever (1991) to Inside Man (2006). Lee did not give specific direction to Blanchard on the tone he wanted for BlacKkKlansman. He simply told Blanchard, "R&B band", to which Blanchard replied, "Electric guitar" as a nod to Jimi Hendrix.

When I saw some of the first cut, there was something about seeing those Afros, those leather coats and those bellbottom jeans that took me back to that period. I’m a product of the ’70s, so the first thing that I thought of was Jimi Hendrix, playing the National Anthem. I kept saying that in my mind, that has to be one of the most patriotic things on the planet. Here was an African-American guy, playing this theme, which to me had the effect of screaming, “I’m an American, too. I belong here, and I should be afforded all of the rights that everybody else has."

— Terence Blanchard, on Jimi Hendrix inspiring his soundtrack of BlacKkKlansman

== Production ==
To give the soundtrack its unique tone, Blanchard integrated the jazzy sound of his band, The E-Collective, with that of a traditional 65-piece orchestra. For example, for the main theme's signature electric guitar riff, Blanchard aimed to create a melancholic sound with an underlying strength, so he backed the guitar with low-pitched orchestral horns. The E-Collective recorded in New Orleans while the orchestra recorded at the Sony Pictures Soundstage in Los Angeles.

The film opens with the battlefield scene from Gone with the Wind over Blanchard's orchestration of "Swanee River".

The ending of the film, which shows footage from the Unite the Right rally of 2017, reused Blanchard's main theme from Inside Man, a deliberate choice by director Spike Lee over what Blanchard had already composed for the film's closing music.

As Lee needed a song for the film's ending credits, he reached out to his friend Troy Carter, a Spotify executive and advisor of Prince's estate. After Carter attended a private screening of BlacKkKlansman, he offered Lee Prince's unreleased cover of "Mary Don't You Weep", which had been recorded on cassette in the mid-80s.

== Release ==
The album was released digitally on August 10, 2018. It was released on vinyl on February 15, 2019 via Waxwork Records.

== Legacy and accolades ==
In 2019, Blanchard's song "Blut Und Boden (Blood and Soil)" earned him the Grammy Award for Best Instrumental Composition, his first Grammy. That year, his soundtrack was also nominated for the Academy Award for Best Original Score and the BAFTA Award for Best Original Music.

== Track listing ==
No.	Title	Length
1.	"Gone With the Wind"	1:01
2.	"Hatred at Its Best"	2:37
3.	"Main Theme"	1:01
4.	"Ron's Theme"	1:26
5.	"Firing Range"	1:33
6.	"No Cross Burning Tonight"	3:11
7.	"Patrice Library"	1:33
8.	"Ron Meets FBI Agent"	1:55
9.	"Connie and the Bomb"	1:17
10.	"Guarding David Duke"	0:57
11.	"Tale of Two Powers 1"	2:40
12.	"Tale of Two Powers 2"	2:20
13.	"Tale of Two Powers 3"	1:44
14.	"Woodrow Wilson"	0:21
15.	"Klan Cavalry"	0:45
16.	"Ron's Search"	1:05
17.	"Patrice Followed"	1:26
18.	"Here Comes Ron"	0:45
19.	"White Power Theme"	0:44
20.	"Partner Funk Theme"	0:40
21.	"Main Theme - Ron"	1:23
22.	"Blut Und Boden (Blood and Soil)"	3:41
23.	"Photo Opps"	3:39
Total length:		37:46
