= Critics' Choice Movie Award for Best Score =

Award given by the Critics Choice Association

Critics' Choice Award for Best Score
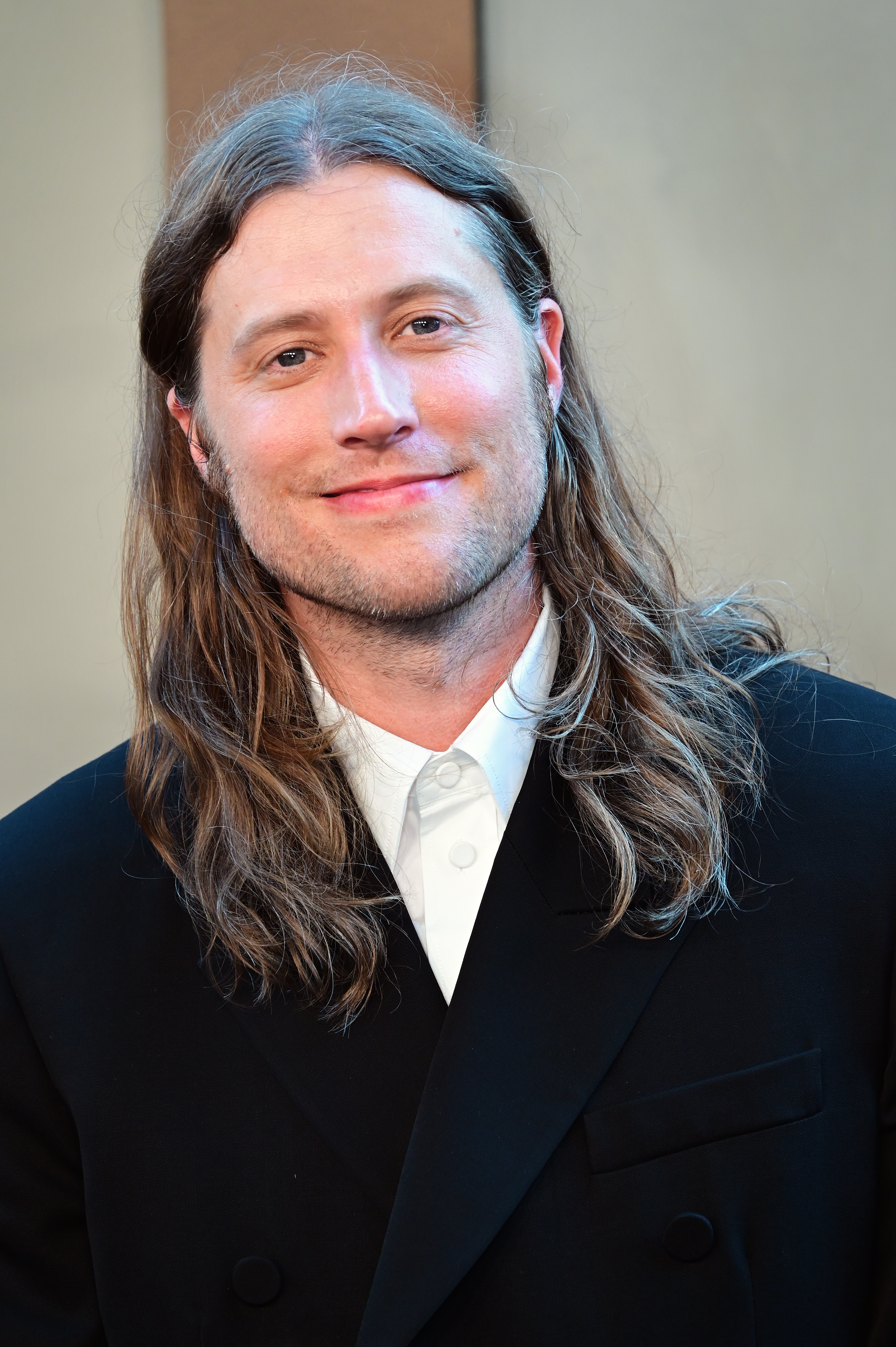
- 2025 recipient: Ludwig Göransson
- Awarded for: Best Score
- Location: Los Angeles, California
- Presented by: Critics Choice Association
- Currently held by: Ludwig Göransson for Sinners (2025)
- Website: www.criticschoice.com

The Critics' Choice Award for Best Score (previously known as the Critics' Choice Award for Best Composer) is one of the Critics' Choice Awards given to people working in the film industry by the Critics Choice Association. It was first given out as a juried award from 1999 to 2001 and then competitively in 2002 onward.

== Winners and nominees ==
=== 1990s ===
Year	Composer(s)	Film	Ref.
1998	John Williams	Saving Private Ryan	
1999	Gabriel Yared	The Talented Mr. Ripley	

=== 2000s ===
Year	Composer(s)	Film(s)	Ref.
2000	Hans Zimmer	Gladiator, Mission: Impossible 2, and The Road to El Dorado	
2001	Howard Shore	The Lord of the Rings: The Fellowship of the Ring	
2001	John Williams	A.I. Artificial Intelligence and Harry Potter and the Sorcerer's Stone	
2001	Christopher Young	The Shipping News	
2002	John Williams	Catch Me If You Can, Harry Potter and the Chamber of Secrets, and Minority Report	
2002	Philip Glass	The Hours	
2002	Howard Shore	The Lord of the Rings: The Two Towers	
2003	Howard Shore	The Lord of the Rings: The Return of the King	
2003	Clint Eastwood	Mystic River	
2003	Danny Elfman	Big Fish	
2003	Gabriel Yared	Cold Mountain	
2003	Hans Zimmer	The Last Samurai	
2004	Howard Shore	The Aviator	
2004	Michael Giacchino	The Incredibles	
2004	Rolfe Kent	Sideways	
2005	John Williams	Memoirs of a Geisha	
2005	James Horner	The New World	
2005	Gustavo Santaolalla	Brokeback Mountain	
2005	Nancy Wilson	Elizabethtown	
2006	Philip Glass	The Illusionist	
2006	Clint Mansell	The Fountain	
2006	Thomas Newman	The Good German	
2006	Gustavo Santaolalla	Babel	
2006	Howard Shore	The Departed	
2006	Hans Zimmer	The Da Vinci Code	
2007	Jonny Greenwood	There Will Be Blood	
2007	Marco Beltrami	3:10 to Yuma	
2007	Alexandre Desplat	Lust, Caution (Se, jie)	
2007	Clint Eastwood	Grace Is Gone	
2007	Dario Marianelli	Atonement	
2007	Alan Menken	Enchanted	
2008	A. R. Rahman	Slumdog Millionaire	
2008	Alexandre Desplat	The Curious Case of Benjamin Button	
2008	Clint Eastwood	Changeling	
2008	Danny Elfman	Milk	
2008	James Newton Howard and Hans Zimmer	The Dark Knight	
2009	Michael Giacchino	Up	
2009	Carter Burwell and Karen O	Where the Wild Things Are	
2009	Marvin Hamlisch	The Informant!	
2009	Randy Newman	The Princess and the Frog	
2009	Hans Zimmer	Sherlock Holmes	

=== 2010s ===
Year	Composer(s)	Film	Ref.
2010	Trent Reznor and Atticus Ross	The Social Network	
2010	Carter Burwell	True Grit	
2010	Alexandre Desplat	The King's Speech	
2010	Clint Mansell	Black Swan	
2010	Hans Zimmer	Inception	
2011	Ludovic Bource	The Artist	
2011	Cliff Martinez	Drive	
2011	Trent Reznor and Atticus Ross	The Girl With the Dragon Tattoo	
2011	Howard Shore	Hugo	
2011	John Williams	War Horse	
2012	John Williams	Lincoln	
2012	Mychael Danna	Life of Pi	
2012	Alexandre Desplat	Argo	
2012	Alexandre Desplat	Moonrise Kingdom	
2012	Jonny Greenwood	The Master	
2013	Steven Price	Gravity	
2013	Arcade Fire	Her	
2013	Thomas Newman	Saving Mr. Banks	
2013	Hans Zimmer	12 Years a Slave	
2014	Antonio Sánchez	Birdman	
2014	Alexandre Desplat	The Imitation Game	
2014	Jóhann Jóhannsson	The Theory of Everything	
2014	Trent Reznor and Atticus Ross	Gone Girl	
2014	Hans Zimmer	Interstellar	
2015	Ennio Morricone	The Hateful Eight	
2015	Carter Burwell	Carol	
2015	Jóhann Jóhannsson	Sicario	
2015	Ryuichi Sakamoto and Alva Noto	The Revenant	
2015	Howard Shore	Spotlight	
2016	Justin Hurwitz	La La Land	
2016	Nicholas Britell	Moonlight	
2016	Jóhann Jóhannsson	Arrival	
2016	Mica Levi	Jackie	
2016	Dustin O'Halloran and Hauschka	Lion	
2017	Alexandre Desplat	The Shape of Water	
2017	Jonny Greenwood	Phantom Thread	
2017	Dario Marianelli	Darkest Hour	
2017	Benjamin Wallfisch and Hans Zimmer	Blade Runner 2049	
2017	John Williams	The Post	
2017	Hans Zimmer	Dunkirk	
2018	Justin Hurwitz	First Man	
2018	Kris Bowers	Green Book	
2018	Nicholas Britell	If Beale Street Could Talk	
2018	Alexandre Desplat	Isle of Dogs	
2018	Ludwig Göransson	Black Panther	
2018	Marc Shaiman	Mary Poppins Returns	
2019	Hildur Guðnadóttir	Joker	
2019	Michael Abels	Us	
2019	Alexandre Desplat	Little Women	
2019	Randy Newman	Marriage Story	
2019	Thomas Newman	1917	
2019	Robbie Robertson	The Irishman	

=== 2020s ===
Year	Composer(s)	Film	Ref.
2020	Jon Batiste, Trent Reznor, and Atticus Ross	Soul	
2020	Alexandre Desplat	The Midnight Sky	
2020	Ludwig Göransson	Tenet	
2020	James Newton Howard	News of the World	
2020	Emile Mosseri	Minari	
2020	Trent Reznor and Atticus Ross	Mank	
2021	Hans Zimmer	Dune	
2021	Nicholas Britell	Don't Look Up	
2021	Jonny Greenwood	The Power of the Dog	
2021	Jonny Greenwood	Spencer	
2021	Nathan Johnson	Nightmare Alley	
2022	Hildur Guðnadóttir	Tár	
2022	Alexandre Desplat	Guillermo del Toro's Pinocchio	
2022	Michael Giacchino	The Batman	
2022	Hildur Guðnadóttir	Women Talking	
2022	Justin Hurwitz	Babylon	
2022	John Williams	The Fabelmans	
2023	Ludwig Göransson	Oppenheimer	
2023	Jerskin Fendrix	Poor Things	
2023	Michael Giacchino	Society of the Snow	
2023	Daniel Pemberton	Spider-Man: Across the Spider-Verse	
2023	Robbie Robertson (posthumous)	Killers of the Flower Moon	
2023	Mark Ronson and Andrew Wyatt	Barbie	
2024	Trent Reznor and Atticus Ross	Challengers	
2024	Volker Bertelmann	Conclave	
2024	Daniel Blumberg	The Brutalist	
2024	Kris Bowers	The Wild Robot	
2024	Clément Ducol and Camille	Emilia Pérez	
2024	Hans Zimmer	Dune: Part Two	
2025	Ludwig Göransson	Sinners	
2025	Alexandre Desplat	Frankenstein	
2025	Jonny Greenwood	One Battle After Another	
2025	Daniel Lopatin	Marty Supreme	
2025	Max Richter	Hamnet	
2025	Hans Zimmer	F1	

== Multiple winners ==
=== 4 wins ===
- John Williams

=== 3 wins ===
- Trent Reznor
- Atticus Ross
- Howard Shore (2 consecutive)

=== 2 wins ===
- Ludwig Göransson
- Hildur Guðnadóttir
- Justin Hurwitz
- Hans Zimmer

== Multiple nominations (3 or more) ==
=== 12 nominations ===
- Alexandre Desplat

=== 11 nominations ===
- Hans Zimmer

=== 8 nominations ===
- John Williams

=== 7 nominations ===
- Howard Shore

=== 6 nominations ===
- Jonny Greenwood

=== 4 nominations ===
- Michael Giacchino
- Ludwig Göransson
- Trent Reznor
- Atticus Ross

=== 3 nominations ===
- Nicholas Britell
- Carter Burwell
- Clint Eastwood
- Hildur Guðnadóttir
- Justin Hurwitz
- Jóhann Jóhannsson
- Thomas Newman

== See also ==
- BAFTA Award for Best Original Music
- Academy Award for Best Original Score
- Golden Globe Award for Best Original Score
- Grammy Award for Best Score Soundtrack for Visual Media
- Grammy Award for Best Compilation Soundtrack for Visual Media
