= Future Ruins (festival) =

Music festival in Los Angeles, US

- Event poster
- Genre: Orchestral, Electronic
- Dates: 8 November 2025 (Cancelled)
- Locations: Los Angeles Equestrian Center, Los Angeles, United States
- Years active: 2025
- Founders: Trent Reznor, Atticus Ross
- Website: futureruins.com

Future Ruins (also known as the Future Ruins Festival) was a cancelled one-day music and arts festival organized by composers and performers Trent Reznor and Atticus Ross. Scheduled to be held in November 2025 at the Los Angeles Equestrian Center, the event was to focus on film and television composers along with performed sets of electronic music.

== History ==
Reznor and Ross began working together on film scores in 2010 with David Fincher's film The Social Network. The collaboration spanned several film and TV show soundtracks.

Future Ruins was first mentioned as a teaser without a name to upcoming ventures under Reznor's and Ross' band Nine Inch Nails in a GQ interview in April 2024. Without a name this left fans speculating on what the ventures would be under vague descriptions as Reznor had mentioned which were film productions, a collaboration with Epic Games, and fashion. Fans continued on how the band had been teasing a music festival since the release of their album Ghosts I–IV in 2008.

The event was cancelled on October 3, 2025.

== Promotion ==
Future Ruins was first announced on May 13, 2025, via Instagram, and its official website launched on May 15, 2025. The festival described itself as an immersive event with three stages that fans can travel through, and promoted as in a once in a lifetime experience and is the first of its kind to occur in Los Angeles. The event puts emphasis on the non-typical structure of hierarchy of artists and each set will be encompassed as its own event, as Reznor states: "Every artist is a headliner, each with their own specially curated moment."

== Line up ==
The festival was promoted to have the following composers.

| Artists and performers billed | Soundtrack credits highlighted by the festival's organizers |
|---|---|
| Cristobal Tapia de Veer | Babygirl, Smile, The White Lotus, Black Mirror, Utopia, Philip K. Dick’s Electric Dreams, Ponyboi, The Third Day, National Treasure, The Girl with All the Gifts, Humans |
| Ben Salisbury and Geoff Barrow | Ex Machina, Civil War, Men, Drokk, Annihilation, Luce, Free Fire, Black Mirror: Men Against Fire, Devs |
| Danny Elfman | Batman, Pee-wee's Big Adventure, Edward Scissorhands, The Nightmare Before Christmas, Beetlejuice, Men in Black, Good Will Hunting, Charlie and the Chocolate Factory, Big Fish, Alice in Wonderland, Spider-Man, Milk |
| Claudio Simonetti's Goblin | Suspiria, Profondo Rosso, Dawn of the Dead, Demons, Tenebrae, Phenomena, Opera |
| Hildur Guðnadóttir | Joker, Chernobyl, A Haunting in Venice, Sicario: Day of the Soldado, Mary Magdalene, Tár, 28 Years Later: The Bone Temple, Women Talking, Hedda |
| TBA | A performance of Howard Shore's score of David Cronenberg’s Crash |
| Isobel Waller-Bridge | Munich – The Edge of War, Emma, Black Mirror: Rachel, Jack and Ashley Too, I Came By, Wicked Little Letters, Fleabag, The Lesson, The Boy, the Mole, the Fox and the Horse, Magpie, Sweetpea |
| John Carpenter | Halloween, They Live, The Thing, Christine, Escape from New York |
| Kyle Dixon and Michael Stein | Stranger Things, Lost in the Night, The Hole in the Fence, Spheres, Native Son, Butterfly, Retaliators, Valley of the Boom |
| Mark Mothersbaugh | The Life Aquatic with Steve Zissou, The Royal Tenenbaums, Rushmore, Bottle Rocket, Rugrats, The Lego Movie, A Minecraft Movie, Cocaine Bear, Thor: Ragnarok |
| Questlove | performing the score works of Curtis Mayfield |
| Robert Aiki Aubrey Lowe | Candyman, Master, Telemarketers, The Color of Care, Grasshopper Republic, Power, Unvion, Seeds, Life After |
| Tamar-kali | Mudbound, Shirley, The Assistant, The Fire Inside, The Last Thing He Wanted, Come Sunday, Palmer, The Lie, Little Richard: I am Everything |
| Terence Blanchard | BlacKkKlansman, Malcolm X, Inside Man, Da 5 Bloods, When the Levees Broke, One Night in Miami, The Woman King, Perry Mason |
| Trent Reznor and Atticus Ross | The Social Network, Watchmen, Gone Girl, Soul, The Girl with the Dragon Tattoo, Challengers, Empire of Light, Waves, The Vietnam War, Mank, The Killer |
| Volker Bertelmann a.k.a. Hauschka | All Quiet on the Western Front, Conclave, Lion, The Amateur, Dune: Prophecy, The Day of the Jackal, Hollywoodgate, Adrift, War Sailor, The Old Guard, Stowaway, Patrick Melrose |
