= Women Talking =

Women Talking may refer to:

- Women Talking (novel), a 2018 novel by Miriam Toews
  - Women Talking (film), a 2022 film adaptation of the novel
  - Women Talking (soundtrack), a score album composed by Hildur Guðnadóttir for the film

== See also ==
- Bechdel test, a measure of the representation of women talking in films.
