= I Am Become Death (disambiguation) =

"I am become Death" is part of a famous quotation from chapter 11, verse 32 of the Bhagavad Gita ("Now I am become Death, the destroyer of worlds"). Physicist J. Robert Oppenheimer recalled that the line came to mind when he witnessed the Trinity nuclear test in 1945.

The phrase may also refer to:

- "I Am Become Death", an episode of the television drama Heroes
- "I Am Become Death", a song by Joe Satriani from his self-titled EP
- "I Am Become Death", a 2015 track by Ben Salisbury and Geoff Barrow from Ex Machina (soundtrack)
- "I Am Become Death", a 2002 album by Wretch Like Me featuring Dave Klein
- "I Am Become Death", a 2014 episode of The 100
