= List of awards and nominations received by Leslie Odom Jr. =

Leslie Odom Jr. awards and nominations
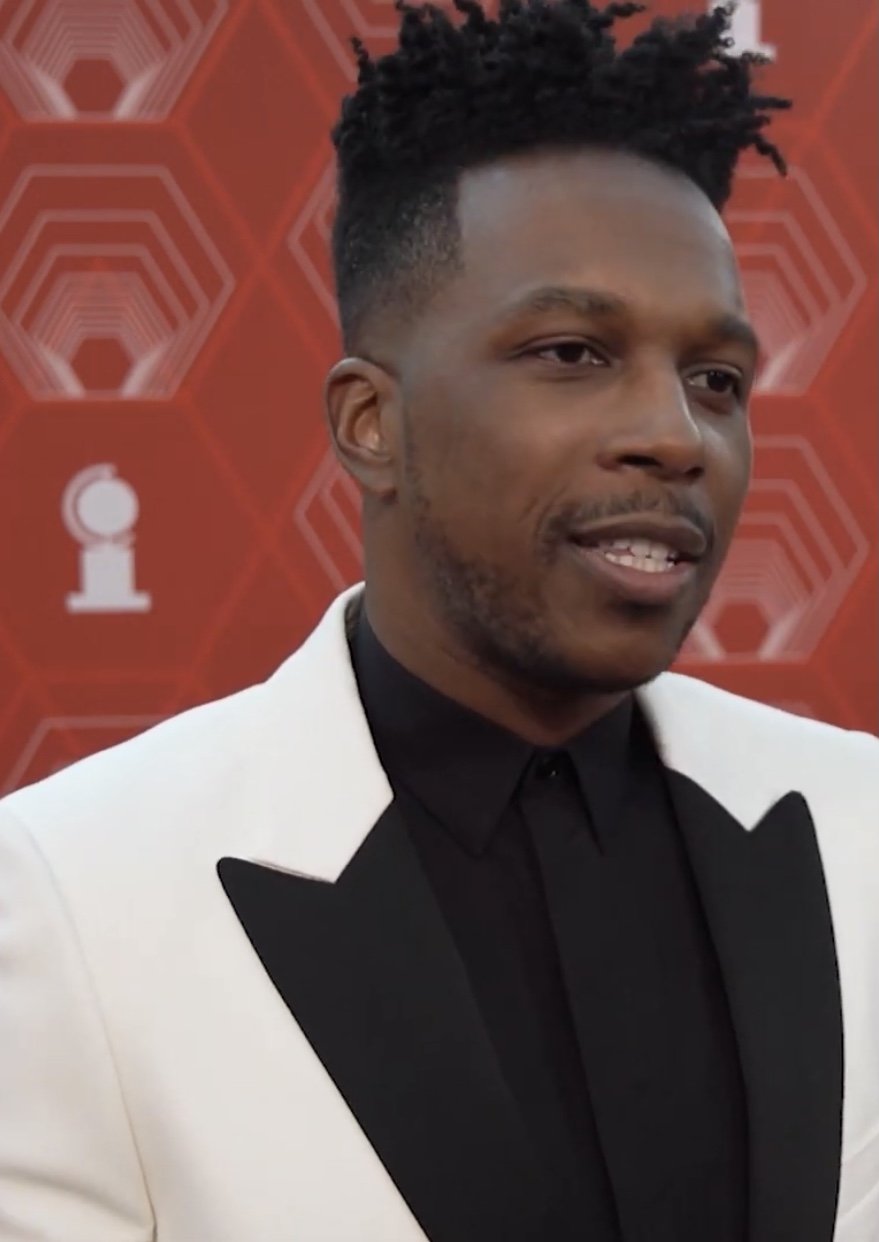
- Odom Jr. at the 74th Tony Awards in 2021
Awards and nominations
Award	Wins	Nominations
Academy Awards	0	2
BAFTA Awards	0	1
Critics' Choice Awards	1	3
Emmy Awards	0	3
Golden Globes	0	2
Grammy Awards	1	3
SAG Awards	0	2
Tony Awards	1	3

Totals (Note: Certain award groups do not simply award one winner. They acknowledge several different recipients, have runners-up, and have third place. Since this is a specific recognition and is different from losing an award, runner-up mentions are considered wins in this award tally. For simplification and to avoid errors, each award in this list has been presumed to have had a prior nomination.)
- Wins: 35
- Nominations: 76

This is a list of awards and nominations received by Leslie Odom Jr.

Leslie Odom Jr. is an American actor, singer and songwriter. He is known for his performances on stage and screen. Over his career he has received various accolades including a Tony Award, a Grammy Award, and a Critics' Choice Award as well as nominations for two Academy Awards, a BAFTA Award, three Primetime Emmy Awards, two Golden Globe Awards, and two Screen Actors Guild Awards.

Leslie Odom Jr. gained prominence and national attention for his portrayal of Aaron Burr in the Lin-Manuel Miranda created Broadway musical Hamilton (2015–2016) for which he earned several awards including the Tony Award for Best Actor in a Musical and the Grammy Award for Best Musical Theater Album. His performance was captured in the Disney+ live stage recording of Hamilton he was nominated for the Primetime Emmy Award for Outstanding Actor in a Leading Role in a Limited Series or Movie. He returned to Broadway in the revival of the Ossie Davis satirical farce Purlie Victorious (2023) for which he was nominated for the Tony Award for Best Actor in a Play.

On film, he portrayed singer Sam Cooke in a semi-fictional historical drama One Night in Miami... (2020). His performance earned him nominations for the Academy Award for Best Supporting Actor, BAFTA Award for Best Actor in a Supporting Role, Golden Globe Award for Best Supporting Actor – Motion Picture, and Screen Actors Guild Award for Outstanding Actor in a Supporting Role. He was also nominated for the Academy Award for Best Original Song and Golden Globe Award for Best Original Song for writing the film's original song "Speak Now". He is also known for his performances in the films Murder on the Orient Express (2017), Harriet (2019), and Glass Onion: A Knives Out Mystery (2022).

On television, he voiced Owen Tillerman, a park manager in the Apple TV+ animated comedy series Central Park (2020) for which he was nominated for the Primetime Emmy Award for Outstanding Character Voice-Over Performance. For producing and hosting The Tony Awards Present: Broadway's Back! (2022) he was nominated for the Outstanding Variety Special (Live). He guest-starred as Draemond Winding, a chief executive of a Charter School in the ABC sitcom Abbott Elementary (2023) he was nominated for the Astra TV Award and Black Reel Award.

== Major associations ==
=== Academy Awards ===
Year	Category	Nominated work	Result	Ref.
2020	Best Supporting Actor	One Night in Miami...	Nominated	
2020	Best Original Song	"Speak Now" (from One Night in Miami...)	Nominated	

=== BAFTA Awards ===
Year	Category	Nominated work	Result	Ref.
British Academy Film Awards
2020	Best Actor in a Supporting Role	One Night in Miami...	Nominated	

=== Critics' Choice Awards ===
Year	Category	Nominated work	Result	Ref.
Critics' Choice Movie Awards
2020	Best Supporting Actor	One Night in Miami...	Nominated	
2020	Best Acting Ensemble	One Night in Miami...	Nominated	
2020	Best Song	"Speak Now" (from One Night in Miami...)	Won	

=== Emmy Awards ===
Year	Category	Nominated work	Result	Ref.
2020	Outstanding Character Voice-Over Performance	Central Park (for "Episode 1")	Nominated	
2021	Outstanding Lead Actor in a Limited Series or Movie	Hamilton	Nominated	
2022	Outstanding Variety Special (Live)	The Tony Awards Present: Broadway's Back!	Nominated	

=== Golden Globe Awards ===
Year	Category	Nominated work	Result	Ref.
2020	Best Supporting Actor – Motion Picture	One Night in Miami...	Nominated	
2020	Best Original Song	"Speak Now" (from One Night in Miami...)	Nominated	

=== Grammy Awards ===
Year	Category	Nominated work	Result	Ref.
2016	Best Musical Theater Album	Hamilton	Won	
2022	Best Compilation Soundtrack for Visual Media	One Night in Miami...	Nominated	
2022	Best Song Written for Visual Media	"Speak Now" (from One Night in Miami...)	Nominated	
2027	Best Traditional Pop Vocal Album	An Offering: Live at Speakeasy Studios	Pending	

=== Screen Actors Guild Awards ===
Year	Category	Nominated work	Result	Ref.
2020	Outstanding Actor in a Supporting Role	One Night in Miami...	Nominated	
2020	Outstanding Cast in a Motion Picture	One Night in Miami...	Nominated	

=== Tony Awards ===
Year	Category	Nominated work	Result	Ref.
2016	Best Actor in a Musical	Hamilton	Won	
2024	Best Actor in a Play	Purlie Victorious	Nominated	
2024	Best Revival of a Play	Purlie Victorious	Nominated	

== Theater awards ==
Year	Association	Category	Project	Result	Ref.
2012	Fred and Adele Astaire Awards	Best Dancer on Broadway	Leap of Faith	Won	
2012	Drama League Awards	Distinguished Performance	Leap of Faith	Nominated	
2015	Drama Desk Awards	Outstanding Featured Actor in a Musical	Hamilton	Nominated	
2015	Lucille Lortel Awards	Outstanding Lead Actor in a Musical	Hamilton	Nominated	
2016	Broadway.com Audience Awards	Favorite Leading Actor in a Musical	Hamilton	Nominated	
2016	Broadway.com Audience Awards	Favorite Onstage Pair (w/ Lin-Manuel Miranda)	Hamilton	Won	
2024	Drama League Awards	Distinguished Performance	Purlie Victorious	Nominated	
2024	Drama Desk Awards	Outstanding Lead Performance in a Play	Purlie Victorious	Nominated	
2024	Drama Desk Awards	Outstanding Revival of a Play	Purlie Victorious	Nominated	
2024	Broadway.com Audience Awards	Favorite Performance of the Year (Play)	Purlie Victorious	Won	
2024	Broadway.com Audience Awards	Favorite Leading Actor in a Play	Purlie Victorious	Won	

== Miscellaneous awards ==
Year	Association	Category	Project	Result	Ref.
2002	Princess Grace Awards	Acting		Won	
2017	NAACP Image Awards	Outstanding Jazz Album	Leslie Odom Jr.	Nominated	
2018	Teen Choice Awards	Choice Drama Movie Actor	Murder on the Orient Express	Nominated	
2020	NAACP Image Awards	Outstanding Supporting Actor in a Motion Picture	Harriet	Nominated	
2021	AAFCA Awards	Best Ensemble	One Night in Miami...	Won	
2021	Alliance of Women Film Journalists Awards	Best Supporting Actor	One Night in Miami...	Won	
2021	Austin Film Critics Association Awards	Best Supporting Actor	One Night in Miami...	Nominated	
2021	Black Film Critics Circle Awards	Best Supporting Actor	One Night in Miami...	Won	
2021	Black Film Critics Circle Awards	Best Ensemble	One Night in Miami...	Won	
2021	Black Reel Awards	Outstanding Supporting Actor	One Night in Miami...	Nominated	
2021	Black Reel Awards	Outstanding Original Song (For "Speak Now")	One Night in Miami...	Won	
2021	Chicago Film Critics Association Awards	Best Supporting Actor	One Night in Miami...	Nominated	
2021	Chicago Indie Critics Circle Awards	Best Original Song (For "Speak Now")	One Night in Miami...	Won	
2021	Dallas–Fort Worth Film Critics Association Awards	Best Supporting Actor	One Night in Miami...	Nominated	
2021	Denver Film Critics Society Awards	Best Original Song (For "Speak Now")	One Night in Miami...	Won	
2021	Detroit Film Critics Society Awards	Best Supporting Actor	One Night in Miami...	Nominated	
2021	Dorian Awards	Best Film Performance – Supporting Actor	One Night in Miami...	Nominated	
2021	Georgia Film Critics Association Awards	Best Supporting Actor	One Night in Miami...	Nominated	
2021	Georgia Film Critics Association Awards	Best Original Song (For "Speak Now")	One Night in Miami...	Won	
2021	Greater Western New York Film Critics Association Awards	Best Supporting Actor	One Night in Miami...	Nominated	
2021	Hawaii Film Critics Society Awards	Best Supporting Actor	One Night in Miami...	Nominated	
2021	Hawaii Film Critics Society Awards	Best Original Song (For "Speak Now")	One Night in Miami...	Won	
2021	Hollywood Critics Association Awards	Best Supporting Actor	One Night in Miami...	Nominated	
2021	Hollywood Critics Association Awards	Best Original Song (For "Speak Now")	One Night in Miami...	Nominated	
2021	Houston Film Critics Society Awards	Best Supporting Actor	One Night in Miami...	Won	
2021	Houston Film Critics Society Awards	Best Original Song (For "Speak Now")	One Night in Miami...	Won	
2021	Indiana Film Journalists Association Awards	Best Supporting Actor	One Night in Miami...	Won	
2021	Indiana Film Journalists Association Awards	Best Ensemble	One Night in Miami...	Nominated	
2021	Independent Spirit Awards	Robert Altman Award	One Night in Miami...	Won	
2021	International Online Cinema Awards	Best Supporting Actor	One Night in Miami...	Nominated	
2021	International Online Cinema Awards	Best Original Song (For "Speak Now")	One Night in Miami...	Nominated	
2021	Iowa Film Critics Awards	Best Supporting Actor	One Night in Miami...	Nominated	
2021	Iowa Film Critics Awards	Best Original Song (For "Speak Now")	One Night in Miami...	Won	
2021	Kansas City Film Critics Circle Awards	Best Supporting Actor	One Night in Miami...	Won	
2021	Latino Entertainment Journalists Association Film Awards	Best Supporting Actor	One Night in Miami...	Nominated	
2021	Latino Entertainment Journalists Association Film Awards	Best Original Song (For "Speak Now")	One Night in Miami...	Won	
2021	Minnesota Film Critics Alliance Awards	Best Supporting Actor	One Night in Miami...	Nominated	
2021	Music City Film Critics Association Awards	Best Supporting Actor	One Night in Miami...	Nominated	
2021	Music City Film Critics Association Awards	Best Original Song (For "Speak Now")	One Night in Miami...	Won	
2021	Music City Film Critics Association Awards	Best Ensemble	One Night in Miami...	Won	
2021	New Mexico Film Critics Award	Best Original Song (For "Speak Now")	One Night in Miami...	Nominated	
2021	New York Film Critics Online Awards	Best Supporting Actor	One Night in Miami...	Nominated	
2021	North Dakota Film Society Awards	Best Original Song (For "Speak Now")	One Night in Miami...	Nominated	
2021	Online Association of Female Film Critics	Best Supporting Male	One Night in Miami...	Nominated	
2021	Online Film & Television Association Awards	Best Supporting Actor	One Night in Miami...	Nominated	
2021	Online Film & Television Association Awards	Best Breakthrough Performance: Male	One Night in Miami...	Nominated	
2021	Online Film & Television Association Awards	Best Original Song (For "Speak Now")	One Night in Miami...	Won	
2021	Online Film Critics Society Awards	Best Supporting Actor	One Night in Miami...	Won	
2021	Philadelphia Film Critics Circle Awards	Best Supporting Actor	One Night in Miami...	Nominated	
2021	Phoenix Critics Circle	Best Supporting Actor	One Night in Miami...	Nominated	
2021	Phoenix Film Critics Society Awards	Best Original Song (For "Speak Now")	One Night in Miami...	Won	
2021	San Diego Film Critics Society Awards	Best Ensemble	One Night in Miami...	Nominated	
2021	San Francisco Bay Area Film Critics Circle Awards	Best Supporting Actor	One Night in Miami...	Nominated	
2021	San Francisco Film Awards	Outstanding Ensemble Performance	One Night in Miami...	Won	
2021	Santa Barbara International Film Festival	Variety Artisans Award (For "Speak Now")	One Night in Miami...	Won	
2021	Satellite Awards	Best Original Song (For "Speak Now")	One Night in Miami...	Nominated	
2021	Seattle Film Critics Society	Best Supporting Actor	One Night in Miami...	Nominated	
2021	St. Louis Film Critics Association Awards	Best Supporting Actor	One Night in Miami...	Nominated	
2021	Sunset Film Circle Awards	Best Supporting Actor	One Night in Miami...	Nominated	
2021	Toronto Film Critics Association Awards	Best Supporting Actor	One Night in Miami...	Nominated	
2021	Utah Film Critics Association Awards	Best Supporting Actor	One Night in Miami...	Won	
2021	Vancouver Film Critics Circle Awards	Best Supporting Actor	One Night in Miami...	Nominated	
2021	Washington D.C. Area Film Critics Association Awards	Best Supporting Actor	One Night in Miami...	Won	
2021	Black Reel Awards	Outstanding Actor, TV Movie/Limited Series	Hamilton	Won	
2021	Hollywood Critics Association Television Awards	Best Actor in a Limited Series, Anthology Series, or Television Movie	Hamilton	Nominated	
2021	NAACP Image Awards	Outstanding Actor in a Television Movie, Mini-Series or Dramatic Special	Hamilton	Nominated	
2021	Online Film & Television Critics Association Awards	Best Actor in a Motion Picture or Limited Series	Hamilton	Nominated	
2021	Satellite Awards	Best Actor in a Motion Picture – Comedy or Musical	Hamilton	Nominated	
2023	Astra TV Awards	Best Guest Actor in a Comedy Series	Abbott Elementary	Nominated	
2023	Black Reel Awards	Outstanding Guest Performance in a Comedy Series	Abbott Elementary	Nominated	
2023	International Online Cinema Awards	Best Guest Actor in a Comedy Series	Abbott Elementary	Nominated	
2023	Online Film & Television Association Awards	Best Guest Actor in a Comedy Series	Abbott Elementary	Nominated	

== Honorary degrees ==
Organizations	Year	Award	Result	Ref.
Carnegie Mellon University,	2019	Honorary Doctorate of Fine Arts (Note: by his alma mater, at its 122nd Commencement, where Odom was also the keynote speaker)	Honored	
