= Wanted (soundtrack) =

2008 album by Danny Elfman

Wanted: Original Motion Picture Soundtrack

Soundtrack album by Danny Elfman
- Released: June 24, 2008
- Recorded: 2007–2008
- Studio: Newman Scoring Stage, 20th Century Fox Studios, Los Angeles
- Genre: Film score
- Length: 48:06
- Label: Lakeshore Records
- Producer: Danny Elfman; Bill Abbott

Danny Elfman chronology
Standard Operating Procedure (2008)	Wanted: Original Motion Picture Soundtrack (2008)	Hellboy II: The Golden Army (2008)

Wanted: Original Motion Picture Soundtrack is the soundtrack to the 2008 film, which is loosely based on the comic book miniseries of the same name and composed by Danny Elfman. It was released by Lakeshore Records on June 24, 2008 in the United States and Canada.

== Background ==
Danny Elfman was invited to do the Wanted score, and accepted because he was a fan of director Timur Bekmambetov's previous films, Night Watch and Day Watch. Considering the film to be a "weird, twisted, sarcastic thing," Elfman decided to make a guitar-based soundtrack, with the "nastiest sounds" and a "heavy metal approach."

The main song that features throughout the film and as the credits roll is a rock song written and performed by Elfman called "The Little Things". Initially, it was just a guitar riff, to which the producers first asked Elfman to add a beat, and then some lyrics. Then, while Elfman was in London scoring Hellboy II: The Golden Army, he received a call from Bekmambetov, asking him to make a full version of the song. "The Little Things" also received a version in Russian.

Also featured twice in the film is the song "Every Day Is Exactly the Same" by Nine Inch Nails. Played for comic relief after the initial car chase is the song "Escape (The Pina Colada Song)" by Rupert Holmes, and "Time to Say Goodbye" by Andrea Bocelli plays while Fox and Wesley kill a man in a limousine.

The Japanese version of Wanted uses the song "DAIGO" by Breakerz as its ending theme.

== Track listing ==
All tracks are written by Danny Elfman.

Track listing
No.	Title	Length
1.	"The Little Things"	3:26
2.	"Success Montage"	3:32
3.	"Fraternity Suite"	3:28
4.	"Wesley's Office Life"	5:15
5.	"The Scheme"	1:44
6.	"Fox in Control"	2:16
7.	"Welcome to the Fraternity"	4:28
8.	"Fox's Story"	3:29
9.	"Exterminator Beat"	2:52
10.	"Rats"	3:28
11.	"The Train"	3:59
12.	"Revenge"	4:33
13.	"Fox's Decision"	2:29
14.	"Breaking the Code"	1:21
15.	"Fate"	1:46

== Release ==
=== Critical response ===
Professional ratings
Review scores
Source	Rating
AllMusic	3.5/5 stars
ScoreNotes	9/10 stars

William Ruhlmann of Allmusic gave the score a positive review, stating:

Composer Danny Elfman proves a good choice to score the action film Wanted, but before his typically lively background music begins, he returns to his earlier career as the leader of a pop/rock band with the opening track, "The Little Things". Here, he pretends that he is once again the lead singer of Oingo Boingo, turning in a good song in the style of the late blue-eyed soul singer Robert Palmer. Then, he gives the 87-member Hollywood Symphony Orchestra some work to do, keeping up with the adventures of the film's hero, Wes, in what must be lots of chasing and shooting; the orchestra is augmented here and there with synthesized sounds to accentuate some of the more forceful passages. A mock Gregorian chant lends reverence to "Fraternity Suite", as Wes learns of his heritage. A Middle Eastern flavor enters into "Fox's Decision". But for the most part this is rigorously written and performed Hollywood action music meant to supplement an already high-adrenalin viewing experience.

Christopher Coleman of Tracksounds.com gave the soundtrack 7 out of 10 rating, stating, "Danny Elfman weaves, what seems to be, nearly a dozen different motifs and other slightly less descript musical segments together to give Wanted its density." Sue Klasky of Monsters and Critics gave the soundtrack a mixed review, stating that "the music is dark, scary and ominous and performed on lots of violins." And that "Elfman's score sounds like it conveys the action in the film."

Zach Freeman of the Blogger News Network gave the soundtrack a positive review and a B+ rating, stating, "Elfman is one of the best composers working today, and though this isn't his best work, it's still darn good."

=== Chart positions ===
Year	Chart	Peak
2008	Billboard Top Independent Albums	48
2008	Top Soundtracks	19
