= Hellboy II: The Golden Army (soundtrack) =

2008 film soundtrack album

Hellboy II: The Golden Army (Original Motion Picture Soundtrack)

Film score by Danny Elfman
- Released: July 8, 2008
- Recorded: 2008
- Studios: Abbey Road Studios, London
- Genre: Film score
- Length: 44:58
- Label: Varèse Sarabande
- Producer: Danny Elfman

Danny Elfman chronology
| Wanted (2008) | Hellboy II: The Golden Army (Original Motion Picture Soundtrack) (2008) | Milk (2008) |

Hellboy II: The Golden Army (Original Motion Picture Soundtrack) is the film score to the 2008 film Hellboy II: The Golden Army directed by Guillermo del Toro based on the Dark Horse Comics character of the same name, created by Mike Mignola. Starring Ron Perlman reprising his role as the titular superhero, it is the second instalment in the Hellboy franchise and a sequel to Hellboy (2004). Danny Elfman composed the film score which was recorded at the Abbey Road Studios in London, with the London Philharmonic Orchestra, conducted by Rick Wentworth, performing the score. Varèse Sarabande released the soundtrack on July 8, 2008.

== Background and development ==
Marco Beltrami, who composed Hellboy (2004) did not score The Golden Army, as the film's production rights transferred to Universal Pictures whose executives demanded a British composer to be hired. Del Toro was curious on working with Danny Elfman and decided to recruit him for The Golden Army. Despite being an American composer, Elfman visited England for recording his scores. Kathy Nelson, president of film music for Universal Music Group and Universal Pictures was also instrumental in Elfman's involvement, having personally known Elfman. He considered the collaboration with Elfman to be rewarding as there was a kinship of spirit. Throughout their musical discussions, del Toro discussed about Ray Harryhausen's animated styles as well as Bernard Herrmann's adventure scores such as The 7th Voyage of Sinbad (1958) and Jason and the Argonauts (1963) and wanted the film to be scored like an old-fashioned adventure film. Elfman instead of aping Herrmann's style, just procreated it and fused with his own style, which del Toro noted on the Herrmannesque style through Elfman's pulse and rhythm. Besides temping Herrmann's score, he also used Elfman's music from Edward Scissorhands (1990) and Planet of the Apes (2001).

Elfman created the score in an operatic way by writing music for each character. He and del Toro denied using Beltrami's theme for Hellboy to refrain sounding it close to his music; the latter considered it to be a jarring effect to have one personality of a composer being shoehorned into another theme, instead agreed with Elfman to make the Golden Army theme and other adventurous themes. Elfman, however, did a minimalistic cue for the main character, but did proceed to create themes, sounds and personalities of the prince, princess and elf kingdom and fused it altogether. Del Toro considered the adventure themes to be Herrmannesque and wanted the film to have a new personality with "The Golden Army Theme". This was achieved using percussions and brass.

Del Toro complimented the wide range of Elfman's musical palette ranging from a romantic, sweet sound to epic and darker themes and to a melancholic sound. The use of children's choir came from Elfman's idea on tooth faries' singing, with the use of xylophone sounds made it creepier. For the ectoplasmic physical medium, Johann Kraus, Elfman had a brief theme which was made with the little march for the introduction of Johann, wanting it to be "Teutonic" and "Bavarian". On Elfman's music, del Toro considered the Troll Market scene giving the spirit of the place and the golden army chamber and golden army fight was considered crucial to the narrative, explaining the character of the robots. The score was recorded at the Abbey Road Studios in London.

== Release ==
Hellboy II: The Golden Army (Original Motion Picture Soundtrack) was released through Varèse Sarabande on July 8, 2008. A deluxe edition of the album was released on February 23, 2024, featuring 39 tracks. It is also available in both digital and physical formats: CD and LPs.

== Track listing ==
=== Standard edition ===
| No. | Title | Length |
|---|---|---|
| 1. | "Introduction" | 3:37 |
| 2. | "Hellboy II Titles" | 1:18 |
| 3. | "Training" | 1:50 |
| 4. | "The Auction House" | 2:28 |
| 5. | "Hallway Cruise" | 1:35 |
| 6. | "Where Fairies Dwell" | 4:17 |
| 7. | "Teleplasty" | 1:21 |
| 8. | "Mein Herring" | 1:05 |
| 9. | "Father and Son" | 6:02 |
| 10. | "A Link" | 1:29 |
| 11. | "A Troll Market" | 1:21 |
| 12. | "Market Troubles" | 3:41 |
| 13. | "A Big Decision" | 1:10 |
| 14. | "The Last Elemental" | 4:11 |
| 15. | "The Spear" | 1:47 |
| 16. | "A Dilemma" | 2:55 |
| 17. | "Doorway" | 3:35 |
| 18. | "A Choice" | 3:58 |
| 19. | "In the Army Chamber" | 5:47 |
| 20. | "Finale" | 6:06 |
| Total length: | | 59:33 |

=== Deluxe edition ===
| No. | Title | Length |
|---|---|---|
| 1. | "Introduction (from Hellboy II)" | 3:39 |
| 2. | "Hellboy II (Main Theme)" | 1:18 |
| 3. | "Enter Mr. Wink" | 1:55 |
| 4. | "Auction House" | 2:34 |
| 5. | "Hallway Cruise" | 1:34 |
| 6. | "Intro Big Red" | 0:38 |
| 7. | "Domestic Fight" | 1:50 |
| 8. | "Where Fairies Dwell (Unedited Original Version)" | 7:12 |
| 9. | "Red's OK" | 0:43 |
| 10. | "Royal Family" | 1:21 |
| 11. | "A Big Decision" | 0:22 |
| 12. | "Manning Ridicule / Father and Son" | 5:16 |
| 13. | "Mein Herring" | 1:04 |
| 14. | "Teleplasty" | 1:19 |
| 15. | "Intimidated? / Secret Agent Suite" | 1:05 |
| 16. | "Entering Troll Market / Marketplace Suite" | 1:21 |
| 17. | "Troll Market Source" | 0:56 |
| 18. | "Troll Market Source (Alternate Version)" | 1:11 |
| 19. | "Princess and Abe" | 0:28 |
| 20. | "Search and Interrogation" | 1:51 |
| 21. | "Reading Each Other" | 2:28 |
| 22. | "Market Fight / Ground Wink" | 2:29 |
| 23. | "Little Informants / The Bean Suite" | 1:19 |
| 24. | "Birth of a God" | 0:41 |
| 25. | "Elemental Flight 1 & 2" | 2:55 |
| 26. | "The Last Elemental" | 4:13 |
| 27. | "Big Decision" | 1:12 |
| 28. | "A Link" | 1:28 |
| 29. | "F**k – Used" | 0:36 |
| 30. | "He's Here" | 0:52 |
| 31. | "Spear (Film Version)" | 2:00 |
| 32. | "The Dilemma" | 2:53 |
| 33. | "Recollection" | 1:57 |
| 34. | "They're Off" | 1:01 |
| 35. | "Doorway – Pts. 1-3" | 3:31 |
| 36. | "A Choice" | 3:42 |
| 37. | "Decision Made Pt. 1 & Pt. 2 Suite" | 1:11 |
| 38. | "Army Chamber / Kill Them (Film Version)" | 6:02 |
| 39. | "Finale (from Hellboy II) (Film Version)" | 3:46 |
| Total length: | | 81:53 |

== Reception ==
Mark Morton of AllMusic wrote "Following his heart-stopping, action score for Wanted, Elfman gets right back on track to make Hellboy II: The Golden Army a jostling ride through chilling adventures." Christian Clemmensen of Filmtracks wrote "Hellboy II: The Golden Army represented an overdue return to Elfman's often beautiful gothic tendencies in most of its length, but it may not resonate with the same success as the best music from his early days." In contrast, Sean Cameron of BBC wrote "At its high points Hellboy II: The Golden Army feels like a retread of his better work; making little impact and failing to work as an album in its own right."

Critic Roger Ebert had noticed "hints of John Williams' "Star Wars" score in the score by Danny Elfman, especially during the final battle. Not a plundering job, you understand; more of an evocation of mood." Tom Joliffe of Flickering Myth called it "a fantastic Elfman score that feels inherently him but also defiantly different from his Batman and Spidey work. It still needs those identifiable marches and quirks but there's a classic adventure score feel beneath those Elfman specialities and even some great use of taiko drums and striking percussive tracks." Olly Harris of Comic Book Resources considered this film and the predecessor to have best superhero scores, with both Elfman and Beltrami "do a great job of creating a dark gothic atmosphere, and it really enhances the moody visuals of the films" capturing Hellboy's world.

== Additional music ==
List of songs featured in the film, but not included in the soundtrack:

- Eddy Arnold – "Santa Claus Is Coming to Town"
- Takako Nishizaki and Jenő Jandó – "Violin Sonata No. 9"
- Travis – "All I Want to Do Is Rock"
- Poet in Process – "Why"
- Brenga Astur – "Nel Caleyu La Fonte"
- Eels – "Beautiful Freak"
- Barry Manilow – "Can't Smile Without You"
- Red Is for Fire – "Noir"

== Personnel credits ==
Credits adapted from liner notes:

- Music composer and producer – Danny Elfman
- Additional music – Halli Cauthery
- Musical arrangements and programming – Thomas Lindgren
- Recording – Peter Cobbin, Noah Scot Snyder
- Score recordist – Lewis Jones
- Mixing – Dennis S. Sands
- Mix recordist – Richard Lancaster
- Mastering – Patricia Sullivan Fourstar
- Music editor – Shie Rozow
- Additional midi preparation – Ernie Lee
- Midi supervision and preparation – Marc Mann
- Musical assistance – Chris Cozens
- Music preparation – Dave Hage
- Executive producers – Robert Townson, Guillermo del Toro, Kathy Nelson

Orchestra

- Orchestra – London Philharmonic Orchestra
- Orchestration – David Slonaker, Edgardo Simone, Jeff Atmajian, Mark McKenzie, Steve Bartek
- Conductor – Rick Wentworth
- Concertmaster – Thomas Bowes
- Orchestra contractor – Isobel Griffiths
- Assistant orchestra contractor – Charlotte Matthews
- Scoring stage crew – John Barrett, Paul Pritchard

Choir

- Choir – Metro Voices
- Choirmaster – Jenny O'Gradey

Management

- Executives in charge of music for Universal Pictures – Harry Garfield, Kathy Nelson
- Music business affairs for Universal Pictures – Phil Cohen
- Album direction for Universal Pictures – David Buntz
- Director of film scoring for Universal Pictures – Tiffany Jones

== Accolades ==
| Award | Category | Recipient(s) and nominee(s) | Result | Ref. |
|---|---|---|---|---|
| International Film Music Critics Association | Best Original Score for a Fantasy/Science Fiction/Horror Film | Danny Elfman | Nominated | |
| Motion Picture Sound Editors | Best Sound Editing – Music in a Feature Film | Shie Rozow (supervising music editor) | Nominated | |
