= Dark Star (soundtrack) =

Soundtrack album by John Carpenter
- Released: 1980
- Recorded: 1973
- Genre: Electronic; film score
- Length: 51:01
- Label: Citadel (original release); We Release Whatever The Fuck We Want (2016 release)

John Carpenter chronology
Halloween (1979)	Dark Star (1980)	Escape from New York (1981)

Dark Star is a soundtrack by John Carpenter for the 1974 film of the same name. While recorded in 1973, it wasn't released by Citadel until 1980, after the 1979 re-release of the film and the success of Carpenter's 1978 film Halloween. A limited expanded edition was released in 2016 through We Release Whatever The Fuck We Want Records.

== Track listing ==
No.	Title	Length
1.	"Music, Sound Effects and Dialogue Excerpts Part 1"	25:10
2.	"Music, Sound Effects and Dialogue Excerpts Part 2"	25:51
Total length:		51:01

2016 reissue bonus tracks
No.	Title	Artist(s)	Length
3.	"When Twilight Falls On NGC 891 (Spring Bossa)"	Martin Segundo and the Scintilla Strings (James Clarke)	3:47
4.	"Doolittle's Solo (Remake)"	Alan Howarth	1:21
5.	"Benson Arizona (Remake)"	Dominik Hauser	2:37
