= Da 5 Bloods (soundtrack) =

Da 5 Bloods (Soundtrack from the Netflix Film)

Film score by Terence Blanchard
- Released: June 5, 2020
- Recorded: 2019–2020
- Studio: Sony Scoring Stage, Sony Pictures Studios, Culver City, California
- Genre: Film score
- Length: 56:46
- Label: Milan
- Producer: Terence Blanchard

Terence Blanchard chronology
Harriet (2019)	Da 5 Bloods (2020)	One Night in Miami... (2021)

Da 5 Bloods (Soundtrack from the Netflix Film) is the soundtrack to the 2020 film Da 5 Bloods, directed by Spike Lee and featuring original music composed by Terence Blanchard. The film's score was released through Milan Records on June 5, 2020 to critical acclaim. Blanchard was nominated for the Academy Award for Best Original Score amongst numerous accolades.

== Development ==
Da 5 Bloods is the sixteenth collaboration between Lee and Blanchard, whose inclusion was confirmed in November 2019. He employed a 90-piece string orchestra to compose the film's score; regarding the use of duduk, played by flautist Pedro Eustache, Blanchard said that his work had "brought a certain color and tone to the film that was perfect". Blanchard had to reflect the humor of the soldiers who were suffering from Post-traumatic stress disorder after the Vietnam war where he described the challenge from being a dramatic to comedic composer. He called the first battle sequence and the helicopter scene as the hardest to score as it took him nearly five days to balance the harmonic and orchestral shifts with the music and analyze the context on how its fits that sequence.

The film also utilised several source music, out of which six songs are from Marvin Gaye's What's Going On (1971). Blanchard deciphered the album as the basis of the score propelling it to have a grandeur and universal theme. He felt that "Gaye's music was going to cover a certain aspect of the emotion of dealing with social injustice in this country" and he wanted the score to accompany the same with a broader experience and emotional connectivity.

== Critical reception ==
Filmtracks.com wrote "Da 5 Bloods is a score that must have looked fabulous on paper but presents issues as recorded." RogerEbert.com wrote "Blanchard’s score is bombastic, terrifying and militaristic one minute, achingly beautiful the next." David Rooney of The Hollywood Reporter and Peter Debruge of Variety described it as "symphonic" and "emotion-rousing". Fionnuala Halligan of Screen International wrote "Da 5 Bloods uses the talents of Lee’s regular musical collaborator Terence Blanchard to remind us we’re in epic Hollywood territory as the crew traipses through the jungle." A critic from Soundtrack World summarized "There are some gorgeous pieces on the album, which are definitely worth listening to."

Kambole Campbell of Empire described it as "a typically rousing score from long-time collaborator Terence Blanchard". Peter Travers of Rolling Stone called it as "an evocative score by Terence Blanchard that ups its resonance with soulful cuts from Marvin Gaye’s seminal 1971 album What’s Going On". Mark Kermode of The Guardian wrote "Terence Blanchard’s rich score is interspersed with bursts of Marvin Gaye’s 1971 album What’s Going On, sometimes erupting as a group singalong, elsewhere surfacing as a plaintive solo voice." Anthony Lane of The New Yorker called it as a "soaring soundtrack". Brian Trutt of USA Today wrote "the sweetest sounds on the "Bloods" soundtrack come from Terence Blanchard's heroic score".

== Track listing ==
Da 5 Bloods (Soundtrack from the Netflix Film) track listing
No.	Title	Length
1.	"What This Mission's About"	4:44
2.	"Otis and Tien Have Dinner"	5:06
3.	"Tien and Daughter Talk"	1:01
4.	"We Bury It (For Now)"	1:36
5.	"MLK Assassinated"	3:47
6.	"David Meets Hedy"	1:32
7.	"Rice Paddies"	1:29
8.	"David and Paul Get Spooked"	3:45
9.	"Bloods Go Into Jungle"	2:15
10.	"Finding the Gold"	3:49
11.	"Paul and David Have a Fallout"	2:35
12.	"Lamb Wants Share of Gold"	1:04
13.	"The VC Are Back"	1:03
14.	"Letter to David"	1:21
15.	"Paul Is Bitten"	0:41
16.	"Otis Talks Family"	3:50
17.	"Paul Loses Money"	1:46
18.	"David Talks About His Mother"	1:55
19.	"Paul and Norman"	5:02
20.	"Paul's Letter"	2:48
21.	"End Credits"	5:37
Total length:		56:46

== Personnel ==
Credits adapted from liner notes.

- Music composer and producer – Terence Blanchard
- Recording – Larry Mah
- Mixing – Greg Hayes
- Mixing assistance – Matt Friedman
- Music editor – Marvin Morris
- Music co-ordinator – Encompass Music Partners
- Executive producer – JC Chamboredon, Stefan Karrer

Orchestra

- Orchestration – Terence Blanchard, William Ross
- Conductor – Terence Blanchard
- Contractor – Peter Rotter
- Concertmaster – Bruce Dukov
- Recording supervisor – Mary Webster
- Session co-ordinator – Robin Burgess
- Copyist – Joann Kane Music Service
- Scoring crew – Brian Van Leer, Greg Dennen, Keith Ukrisna, Ryan Nelson

Instruments

- Bassoon – Kenneth Munday, Rose Corrigan, Anthony Parnther
- Cello – Adrienne Woods, Armen Ksajikian, Dennis Karmazyn, Eric Byers, Giovanna Clayton, Jacob Braun, Michelle Rearick, Timothy Loo, Vanessa Freebairn-Smith, Helen Altenbach, Steve Erdody
- Clarinet – Chris Stoutenborough, Donald Foster, Joshua Ranz, Ralph Williams, Stuart Clark
- Contrabass – BJ Johnson, Edward Meares, Karl Vincent-Wickcliff, Nico Abondolo, Nicolas Philippon, Stephanie Payne, Stephen Dress, Michael Valerio
- Duduk – Pedro Eustache
- Flute – Ben Smolen, Jennifer Olson, Julie Burkert, Heather Clark
- Harp – Lara Somogyi
- Horn – Adedeji Ogunfolu, Benjamin Jaber, Dylan Hart, Jaclyn Rainey, Katelyn Faraudo, Laura Brenes, Mark Adams, Steven Becknell, Teag Reaves, David Everson
- Oboe – Jennifer Cullinan, Geoffrey Johnson
- Percussion – Brian Kilgore, Donald Williams, Edward Atkatz, Kenneth Morgan, Pete Korpela, Steven Schaeffer, Wade Culbreath
- Trombone – William Reichenbach, Burt Mason, John Lofton, Alexander Iles
- Trumpet – Aaron Smith, Barry Perkins, Daniel Rosenboom, Robert Schaer, Jon Lewis
- Tuba – Doug Tornquist
- Viola – Alma Fernandez, David Walther, Zach Dellinger, Luke Maurer, Lynne Richburg, Michael Nowak, Michael Whitson, Morgan O'Shaughnessey, Nikki Shorts, Phillip Triggs, Robert Brophy, Shawn Mann, Stefan Smith, Victoria Miskolczy, Andrew Duckles
- Violin – Amy Hershberger, Carol Pool, Charlie Bisharat, Chris Woods, Crystal Alforque, Dale Briedenthal, Darius Campo, Eun-Mee Ahn, Helen Nightengale, Irina Voloshina, Jessica Guideri, Jessica McJunkins, Marc Sazer, Mark K. Cargill, Max Karmazyn, Melissa White, Nadira Scruggs, Natalie Leggett, Philip Payton, Phillip Levy, Rafael Rishik, Roger Wilkie, Ron Clark, Sarah Thornblade, Scott Tixier, Shalini Vijayan, Stephanie Matthews, Tamara Hatwan, Tereza Stanislav, Wynton Grant, Julie Gigante

== Accolades ==
Accolades for Da 5 Bloods (Soundtrack from the Netflix Film)
Award	Category	Recipients(s)	Result	Ref.
Academy Awards	Best Original Score	Terence Blanchard	Nominated	
Austin Film Critics Association	Best Score	Terence Blanchard	Nominated	
Chicago Film Critics Association	Best Original Score	Terence Blanchard	Nominated	
Hollywood Music in Media Awards	Best Original Score in a Feature Film	Terence Blanchard	Nominated	
International Film Music Critics Association	Best Original Score for a Drama Film	Terence Blanchard	Nominated	
Online Film Critics Society	Best Original Score	Terence Blanchard	Nominated	
San Francisco Bay Area Film Critics Circle	Best Original Score	Terence Blanchard	Nominated	
Seattle Film Critics Society	Best Original Score	Terence Blanchard	Nominated	
Society of Composers & Lyricists	Outstanding Original Score for a Studio Film	Terence Blanchard	Nominated	
