= Inside Man (soundtrack) =

Inside Man (Original Motion Picture Soundtrack)

Film score by Terence Blanchard
- Released: March 21, 2006
- Genre: Film score
- Length: 56:16
- Label: Varèse Sarabande
- Producer: Terence Blanchard

Terence Blanchard chronology
She Hate Me (2004)	Inside Man (2006)	Talk to Me (2007)

Inside Man (Original Motion Picture Soundtrack) is the soundtrack to the 2006 film Inside Man directed by Spike Lee. The soundtrack featured several themes from the film score composed by Terence Blanchard, Lee's regular collaborator and the track "Chaiyya Chaiyya Bollywood Joint", which is a remixed version of the song "Chaiyya Chaiyya" from the Hindi film Dil Se.. (1998). This song is played in the opening credits of the film, while its remix (performed by Panjabi MC) appears in the end credits. It was first released in physical formats on March 21, 2006, by Varèse Sarabande. Most of the themes featured in the film consisted of an old-school rhythm and blues flavor, which was to match Denzel Washington's career.

== Reception ==
James Southall of Movie Wave wrote "The album as a whole is effective and impressive, if not the most entertaining; a solid thriller score." Filmtracks.com wrote "this music is all over the map, and as much interesting talent as Blanchard exhibits on a regular basis, it might have been more fruitful had he resisted the temptation of a standard orchestral action score and infused the film with some consistent high stakes jazz or other genre-bending style that would cater to his abilities."

== Track listing ==
No.	Title	Artist(s)	Length
1.	"Ten Thirty"		1:58
2.	"Thrown a Bone"		2:36
3.	"Steve Switcharoo"		1:35
4.	"Dalton's World"		0:45
5.	"357"		0:58
6.	"392"		1:39
7.	"2nd Floor Window"		0:46
8.	"Defend Brooklyn"		1:17
9.	"Food Chain"		1:11
10.	"Above Your Pay Grade"		1:27
11.	"Everything Hunky Dory"		1:29
12.	"Frazier's Tour"		4:52
13.	"Press Here to Play"		1:41
14.	"Nothing Yet"		2:06
15.	"Demands In Place"		1:00
16.	"Here Lies Peter Hammond"		2:34
17.	"Nazis Pay Too Well"		3:54
18.	"Nice Talking to You"		1:18
19.	"They Bugged Us"		1:45
20.	"Hostage Takedown"		2:49
21.	"Dr. Phil"		1:12
22.	"Photo Ops"		2:00
23.	"ESU Search"		1:26
24.	"Dalton's Cell"		1:11
25.	"Follow the Ring"		4:17
26.	"Good and Ready"		2:20
27.	"Chaiyya Chaiyya Bollywood Joint"	Sukwinder Singh and Sapna Awasthi featuring Panjabi MC	6:12
Total length:			56:18

== Accolades ==
Blanchard received a nomination for Outstanding Original Score at the Black Reel Awards of 2007.

== Credits ==
Credits adapted from liner notes.

- Composer – Terence Blanchard
- Producer – Spike Lee, Terence Blanchard
- Engineer – Frank Wolf
- Music editor – Todd Bozung
- Mastering – Erick Labson
- Music co-ordinator – Robin Burgess
- Assistant co-ordinator – Vincent Bennett
- Copyist – Julian Bartolyubov
- Scoring crew – Jay Silvester, Kirsten Smith, Marc Gebauer, Tom Hardisty
- Executive producer – Robert Townson, Brian Grazer, Spike Lee
- Assistant producer – Robin Burgess
- Liner notes – Terence Blanchard
- Album direction (Universal Pictures) – David Buntz
- Executive in charge of music (Universal Pictures) – Harry Garfield, Kathy Nelson
- Music business and legal affairs (Universal Pictures) – Phil Cohen

Instruments

- Bass – Derrick Hodge, Don Ferrone, Mike Valerio, Neil Garber, Nicholas Franco, Nicolas Philippon, Oscar Hidalgo, Steve Edelman, Timothy Eckert, Ed Meares
- Bassoon – Kenneth Munday, Michael O'Donovan
- Cello – Christina Soule, Dane Little, David Low, Douglas Davis, Eric Sung, Erika Duke, George Scholes, Larry Corbett, Roger Lebow, Rowena Hammill, Sebastian Toettcher, Stan Sharp, Steve Richards, Todd Hemmenway, Trevor Handy, Victor Lawrence, Dave Speltz
- Clarinet – Steve Roberts, Jim Kanter
- Drums – Kendrick Scott
- Flute – Geri Rotella, James Walker
- Horn – James Thatcher, John Reynolds, Kristy Morrell, Mark Adams, Brian O'Connor
- Oboe – Phil Ayling, Thomas Boyd
- Percussion – Alan Estes, Dan Greco, Donald Williams, Gregory Goodall, Wade Culbreath, Steve Schaeffer
- Piano – Aaron Parks
- Saxophone – Brice Winston
- Trombone – Alan Kaplan, Bill Reichenbach, George Thatcher, Charlie Loper
- Trumpet – Jon Lewis, Terence Blanchard, Malcolm McNab
- Tuba – Tommy Johnson
- Viola – Andrew Duckles, Andrew Picken, Dan Neufeld, Denyse Buffum, Jennie Hansen, Karen Van Sant, Karie Prescott, Lynne Richburg, Pamela Goldsmith, Piotr Jandula, Rick Gerding, Robert Becker, Sam Formicola, Scott Hosfeld, Simon Oswell
- Violin – Agnes Gottschewski, Alyssa Park, Armen Garabedian, Charlie Bisharat, Darius Campo, Galina Golovin, Henry Gronnier, Isabelle Senger, Ishani Bhoola, Jay Rosen, Joel Derouin, Josefina Vergara, Julie Gigante, Liane Mautner, Lorand Lokuszta, Marc Sazer, Marina Manukian, Mario DeLeon, Michele Richards, Miran Kojian, Ray Kobler, Robin Olson, Roger Wilkie, Shalini Vijayan, Sid Page, Songa Lee-Kitto, Tereza Stanislav

Orchestra

- Orchestra – The Hollywood Studio Symphony
- Orchestration – Howard Drossin, Terence Blanchard
- Conductor – Terence Blanchard
- Contractor – Sandy de Crescent
- Concertmaster – Bruce Dukov
