= A Haunting in Venice (soundtrack) =

2023 soundtrack album by Hildur Guðnadóttir

A Haunting in Venice (Original Motion Picture Soundtrack)

Soundtrack album by Hildur Guðnadóttir
- Released: September 15, 2023
- Recorded: 2023
- Studio: Abbey Road Studios
- Genre: Film score
- Length: 34:46
- Label: Hollywood
- Producer: Hildur Guðnadóttir

Hildur Guðnadóttir chronology
| Women Talking (2022) | A Haunting in Venice (2023) | Joker: Folie à Deux (2024) |

A Haunting in Venice (Original Motion Picture Soundtrack) is the soundtrack album composed by Hildur Guðnadóttir for the 2023 film A Haunting in Venice by Kenneth Branagh. It was released by Hollywood Records on September 15, 2023.

== Background ==
At CinemaCon in April 2023, director Kenneth Branagh announced that composer Hildur Guðnadóttir would be scoring A Haunting in Venice, marking Hildur's first collaboration with Branagh. Hildur replaced Branagh's longtime collaborator Patrick Doyle, who had scored the film's two sequels, Murder on the Orient Express and Death on the Nile.

== Production ==
Hildur grew up reading Agatha Christie novels, and already had a "strong idea" about how she felt the genre would sound before she signed on to score the film. As the film takes place during a séance at a Halloween party, Branagh wanted his score to feel "darker and almost horror"-like.

The score heavily features strings and woodwinds, as Hildur wanted it to feel like an "organic and classical" chamber piece.

[Branagh] wanted to enter the realm of the supernatural, and he really wanted the orchestration to be much narrower and closer. So he always talked about wanting this to be a chamber piece, and he also wanted the tonality to be quite abstract. So these were the large parameters that I had to play with, and I just think that they fit so perfectly for the film, because it stays more on Poirot and the personal questions that he's asking himself. It's a more focused Poirot story. The movie is in one space most of the time, so it's kind of claustrophobic. And the music being on the smaller side helps with that.

— Hildur Guðnadóttir

The film takes place in post-war Venice, which Hildur kept in mind when scoring the film. When the film reflects on pre-war times, Hildur used "incredibly romantic, overdramatic and over-expressive tonality". On the other hand, in the post-war period, Hildur switched to an atonal sound to accompany the sense of "rebuilding the world" after the war.

The score was performed by the London Contemporary Orchestra at Abbey Road Studios.

== Track listing ==
A Haunting in Venice (Original Motion Picture Soundtrack) track listing
| No. | Title | Length |
|---|---|---|
| 1. | "Haunt" | 3:45 |
| 2. | "Gondolas" | 2:47 |
| 3. | "Alcoven" | 2:52 |
| 4. | "No Music Without Her" | 2:46 |
| 5. | "Seance" | 1:48 |
| 6. | "Psychic Pain" | 2:53 |
| 7. | "St. Louis" | 3:09 |
| 8. | "Pipes" | 2:13 |
| 9. | "Confession" | 8:14 |
| 10. | "Money in the Mattress" | 4:19 |
| Total length: | | 34:46 |

== Reception ==
=== Critical response ===
Hildur's score received positive reviews from film critics, with Ann Hornaday of The Washington Post complimenting it as "elegiac". Brian Truitt of USA Today said that Hildur's "darkly classical score sets a pleasingly creepy vibe". Tim Grierson of Screen International wrote that the "string-laden score only amplify the audience's dread that something paranormal is afoot". Lindsey Bahr of ABC News wrote that the score enhances the "moody but palatable scares".

However, reviews from music critics were mostly negative. Filmtracks.com opined that "The only distinguishing characteristic of the music for A Haunting in Venice is its totally inscrutable and meaningless existence." Music critic Jonathan Broxton summarised "A Haunting in Venice is a huge disappointment. It's not interesting from a musical point of view, it doesn't offer anything new or challenging – in fact, this is an example of [Hildur] staying very firmly within her cello texture comfort zone – and the album listening experience comes close to being boring."

=== Accolades ===
A Haunting in Venice (Original Motion Picture Soundtrack) awards and nominations
| Award | Year (Note: Indicates the year of ceremony. Each year is linked to the article about the awards held that year, wherever possible.) | Category | Result | Ref. |
|---|---|---|---|---|
| Hollywood Music in Media Awards | 2023 | Best Original Score in a Horror Film | Won | |
