= Babygirl (soundtrack) =

Babygirl (Original Soundtrack)

Film score by Cristobal Tapia de Veer
- Released: December 25, 2024
- Length: 20:19
- Label: A24 Music
- Producer: Cristobal Tapia de Veer

Cristobal Tapia de Veer chronology
Smile 2 (Music from the Motion Picture) (2024)	Babygirl (Original Soundtrack) (2024)

Singles from Babygirl (Original Soundtrack)
- 1. "Mommy's Dollhouse" / "Wolves" Released: November 27, 2024

Babygirl (Original Soundtrack) is the film score soundtrack to the 2024 film Babygirl directed by Halina Reijn, starring Nicole Kidman, Harris Dickinson, Sophie Wilde and Antonio Banderas. The album features 12 tracks from the score composed by Cristobal Tapia de Veer and released through A24 Music on December 25, 2024.

== Background and development ==
On February 14, 2024, it was announced that Cristobal Tapia de Veer would compose the musical score for Babygirl. The main themes—"Mommy's Dollhouse" and "Wolves"—were tuned as integral to the storyline, which utilized strings, piano and operatic vocals which was written with de Veer's partner Kim Neundoff; the latter was playing with the right hand which was a "waltz-y melody" while de Veer played the left hand as a "military march". While waltz would be played thrice, his rendition has been four times, providing the militaristic approach to Romy's professional life. The second song "Wolves" used distorted vocals, animalistic breathing and the growling sound of wolves, which emphasized Romy's personal transformation as a werewolf situation, described in the film.

While composing the theme for "Wolves", de Veer recorded a sample of Kidman's "woo" sound when she almost tripped on the set during one of the dailies, which de Veer saw. As he found it spontaneous, he used the sample in this track. It was the second instance, where he sampled Kidman's voice in his work, after he did the same for a part of Kidman's argument with Tom Cruise in Eyes Wide Shut (1999). The final sequence—when Romy's husband Jacob helps bring her fantasies to life—blends those two themes in terms of soundscape and harmony.

Meghan Currier served as the music supervisor who helped Reijn select diegetic music. The George Michael song "Father Figure" (1987) was written in the film's first draft, where Reijn played the song constantly while writing. The song served as the guiding sound to Romy and Samuel's relationship and was secured by Currier as there were no alternative songs to that situation. She added "The song has a much more grounded, soft quality to it that supports what we're seeing in the dynamics of the two in this beautiful hotel room. It feels more cocooned and safe."

Besides the use of pre-recorded music, Sky Ferreira wrote and co-produced the song "Leash" for the film. It was her first independent release after her departure from Capitol Records in 2023. Reijn wanted her to contribute to the soundtrack as her style coincided with the film's theme. After watching the film, she understood and connected with the story, agreeing to compose the song.

== Release ==
The song "Leash" was released as an independent single on December 5. de Veer's score was released digitally on December 25, 2024, through A24 Music, and was preceded by the singles "Mommy's Dollhouse" and "Wolves" which released a month prior.

== Reception ==
Hannah Strong of Little White Lies described it as a "breathy, intense" and Marshall Shaffer of Slant Magazine called it as a "electrifying". Chris Bumbray of JoBlo.com called it as "propulsive score". David Rooney of The Hollywood Reporter further described it as "a fabulously eclectic, mood-shaping score by Chilean-born Canadian composer Cristobal Tapia de Veer." Radhika Seth of Vogue appreciated the "expertly tension-building score". Sara Michelle Fetters of The Seattle Times wrote "Coupled with composer Cristobal Tapia de Veer's chillingly sultry themes, the overall effect is sensuously intoxicating."

For the 97th Academy Awards, de Veer's score was shortlisted in the category of Best Original Score.

== Track listing ==
All tracks are written by Cristobal Tapia de Veer.

Babygirl (Original Soundtrack) track listing
No.	Title	Length
1.	"Mommy's Dollhouse"	1:38
2.	"Whatever You Tell Me to Do"	1:25
3.	"No No"	2:02
4.	"Mentor"	1:08
5.	"Pain"	1:55
6.	"Waking Up"	0:42
7.	"Whatever I Tell You to Do"	0:46
8.	"Pool"	2:40
9.	"If I Wanna Be Humiliated I'm Gonna Pay Someone to Do It"	1:47
10.	"Come Back"	1:04
11.	"Wolves"	2:47
12.	"Babygirl"	2:20

== Additional music ==
List of songs featured in the film but not in the soundtrack:

- "It's Christmas" by Carl Coccomo
- "Dancing on My Own" by Robyn
- "Carres" by Crowander
- "12 Clock" by The Skyler Hagner Big Band
- "De Toneelacademie" by De Jeugd Van Tegenwoordig
- "Never Tear Us Apart" by INXS
- "Father Figure" by George Michael
- "Sleeper" by BadBadNotGood and Charlotte Day Wilson
- "Deceptacon" by Le Tigre
- "Creep" by Yellow Claw, Stolenhoff and Police in Paris
- "Crush" by Yellow Claw and Natte Visstick ft. Rhyme
- "LSD" by Yellow Claw ft. Syaqish
