= Cocaine Bear (soundtrack) =

Cocaine Bear (Original Motion Picture Soundtrack)

Film score by Mark Mothersbaugh
- Released: February 24, 2023
- Recorded: 2022–2023
- Genre: Film score
- Length: 46:54
- Label: Back Lot Music
- Producer: Mark Mothersbaugh

Mark Mothersbaugh chronology
Hotel Transylvania: Transformania (2022)	Cocaine Bear (2023)	The Magician's Elephant (2023)

Cocaine Bear (Original Motion Picture Soundtrack) is the soundtrack to the 2023 film directed by Elizabeth Banks. Featuring original score composed by Mark Mothersbaugh, whom previously collaborated with Banks on Pitch Perfect 2 (2015), the film also marked Mothersbaugh's first score for a live action film since Holmes & Watson (2018). The soundtrack was released by Back Lot Music on February 24, 2023, featured Mothersbaugh's original score, as well as a remix of Melle Me''s 1983 single "White Lines (Don't Don't Do It)", performed by Pusha T. The album was issued by Waxwork Records on a 180-gram double vinyl, which released the album on August 11, 2023.

== Development ==
In February 2022, Natalie Holt was signed to compose music for the film but was replaced by Mothersbaugh in November 2022. The film's setting allowed him to use the synth sensibilites that permeated Devo's sound to complement the film, that had moments of jocularity. Mothersbaugh went back and listened to popular music from the 1980s which "pulled out old Devo out of the closet to put on some of the tracks". He received a complete edit of the film by Banks by early 2022, resulting him to compose the score within weeks. In June 2022, the recording of the score held at Abbey Road Studios with Mothersbaugh supervising the score through Zoom.

== Track listing ==
No.	Title	Artist(s)	Length
1.	"Kristoffer and Elsa Hike"		2:16
2.	"Bear Attack"		1:33
3.	"Bathroom Fight"		2:28
4.	"Up and Down a Tree"		4:41
5.	"Bear on the Roof"		2:45
6.	"Bob Arrives"		1:03
7.	"No Entry…Bear"		3:14
8.	"Bob Finds Gazebo"		0:46
9.	"Bob Shoots Daveed"		1:48
10.	"Cokey Falls Asleep"		1:40
11.	"Bear Dance"		3:27
12.	"Bad Cop and Butterfly"		2:39
13.	"Waterfall"		5:36
14.	"Cliffside Confrontation"		2:47
15.	"Cokey Comes Alive"		3:23
16.	"Bros"		1:06
17.	"Rosette / Wrap Up"		2:40
18.	"White Lines (Cocaine Bear Remix)"	Pusha T	3:02
Total length:			46:54

== Reception ==
Clint Worthington of Consequence praised the score as "sprightly synth" and "layered with Devo charm". Tim Grierson of Screen International praised that composer Mothersbaugh "craft over-the-top dramatic themes". Richard Trenholm of CNET wrote that the synth-driven score from Mothersbaugh and the needle drops "add to the tacky retro feel". "Alonso Duralde of TheWrap complimented the score as "witty but strategically-placed".

== Additional music ==
The film consisted of the following songs, which were not included in the soundtrack.

- Jefferson Starship – "Jane"
- Scandal feat. Patty Smyth – "The Warrior"
- Slim Whitman – "Love Song of the Waterfall"
- Jeffrey Osborne – "On the Wings of Love"
- Commodores – "Too Hot ta Trot"
- Berlin – "No More Words"
- Depeche Mode – "Just Can't Get Enough (The Math Cluc Remix)"
- Young Goose – "Pyro (Dizzy Spells Remix)"
- Kathe Dee – "Trail Of Tears"

== Release history ==
Release dates and formats for Red, White & Royal Blue (Amazon Original Motion Picture Soundtrack)
Region	Date	Format(s)	Label	Ref.
Various	February 24, 2023	CD; digital download; streaming	Back Lot Music	
Various	August 11, 2023	Vinyl	Waxwork Records	
