= Escape from New York (soundtrack) =

Escape from New York: Original Motion Picture Soundtrack

Film score by John Carpenter and Alan Howarth
- Released: 1981
- Studios: Pi West Studios, Glendale, California
- Genres: Electronic; film score
- Length: 37:22
- Label: Varèse Sarabande
- Producers: John Carpenter, Alan Howarth

John Carpenter chronology
Dark Star (1980)	Escape from New York (Original Motion Picture Soundtrack) (1981)	Halloween II (1981)

Alan Howarth chronology
Escape from New York (Original Motion Picture Soundtrack) (1981)	Halloween II (1981)

Alternative cover
- 2000 remastered edition

Professional ratings
Review scores
Source	Rating
AllMusic	4.5/5 stars

Escape from New York (Original Motion Picture Soundtrack) is a soundtrack album composed and performed by John Carpenter and Alan Howarth, featuring the score to the 1981 film of the same name.

== Recording ==
Sound designer Alan Howarth was introduced to John Carpenter by the picture editor of the film, Todd Ramsay, who had worked with Howarth on Star Trek: The Motion Picture. Howarth used equipment including ARP and Prophet-5 synthesizers and a Linn LM-1 drum machine, as well as an acoustic piano and Fender guitars, to create the palette of sounds used in the score, while Carpenter composed the melodies on the synthesizer keyboards. As the MIDI standard had yet to be invented, Howarth manually synchronized the equipment to picture while listening to a copy of the film's dialogue. Initial inspirational directions which Carpenter shared with Howarth included albums by Tangerine Dream and The Police.

== Release ==
The original release included a contractual obligation to provide a written musical score, which Howarth manually transcribed after recording was completed. The soundtrack was released in 1981 through Varèse Sarabande (originally on vinyl, then CD in 1982); a remastered and remixed edition was reissued in 2000 through Silva Screen Records, containing an extra fifteen tracks not included on the original version (eight of them being short extracts of dialogue from the film), as well as expanded liner notes.

== Track listing ==
All tracks are written by John Carpenter and Alan Howarth, except where noted.

No.	Title	Length
1.	"Main Title"	3:51
2.	"Up the Wall/Airforce #1"	2:27
3.	"Orientation #2"	1:47
4.	"Engulfed Cathedral" (Claude Debussy)	3:32
5.	"Back to the Pod/The Crazies Come Out"	3:01
6.	"Arrival at the Library"	1:05
7.	"Everyone's Coming to New York" (Nick Castle)	2:52
8.	"The Duke Arrives/The Barricade"	3:35
9.	"Police State/Romero and the President"	3:21
10.	"The President at the Train"	2:53
11.	"The President Is Gone"	2:30
12.	"Chase Across the 69th Street Bridge"	2:46
13.	"Over the Wall"	3:42
Total length:		37:22

=== 2000 remastered edition ===
No.	Title	Length
1.	"Main Title"	3:53
2.	"The Bank Robbery"	3:30
3.	""Prison Introduction"" (dialogue)	0:20
4.	"Over the Wall/Airforce One"	2:23
5.	"He's Still Alive/Romero"	2:12
6.	""'Snake' Plissken"" (dialogue)	1:41
7.	"Orientation"	1:47
8.	""Tell Him"" (dialogue)	1:46
9.	"Engulfed Cathedral" (writer: Claude Debussy)	3:33
10.	"Across the Roof"	1:17
11.	"Descent into New York"	3:37
12.	"Back to the Pod – Version #1"	1:34
13.	"Everyone's Coming to New York" (writer: Nick Castle)	2:24
14.	""Don't Go Down There!"" (dialogue)	0:19
15.	"Back To The Pod – Version #2/The Crazies Come Out"	2:09
16.	""I Heard You Were Dead!"" (dialogue)	0:08
17.	"Arrival at the Library"	1:06
18.	""You Are the Duke of New York"" (dialogue)	0:16
19.	"The Duke Arrives/Barricade"	3:35
20.	"President at the Train"	2:28
21.	""Who Are You?"" (dialogue)	0:27
22.	"Police Action"	2:27
23.	"Romero and the President"	1:43
24.	"The President Is Gone"	1:53
25.	"69th Street Bridge"	2:44
26.	"Over the Wall"	3:42
27.	""The Name Is Plissken"" (dialogue)	0:25
28.	"Snake Shake"	3:58
Total length:		57:17

== Personnel ==
- John Carpenter – piano, synthesizers, composition, production
- Alan Howarth – synthesizers, guitar, bass guitar, sequencing, programming, composition, engineering, production
- Tommy Lee Wallace – guitar
- Pamela Smith – piano
