= Halloween (1978 soundtrack) =

Film score by John Carpenter
- Released: October 1983 (USA)
- Recorded: 1978
- Studios: Sound Arts Studio, Los Angeles, California
- Genres: Electronic; film score
- Length: 33:43 (1983 release); 51:51 (1998 release); 45:58 (2018 release)
- Labels: Columbia (1979 release); Varèse Sarabande (1983 & 1998 releases); Mondo Records (2018 release)

John Carpenter chronology
Halloween (1978)	Dark Star (1980)

Professional ratings
Review scores
Source	Rating
AllMusic	4/5 stars

Halloween is a soundtrack album composed and performed by John Carpenter, featuring the score to the 1978 film Halloween. It was released in Japan in 1979 by Columbia Records and in the United States in 1983 through Varèse Sarabande. An expanded 20th Anniversary Edition was released in 1998 through Varèse Sarabande. In 2018, an LP was released by Mondo Records featuring the mono tracks taken from the original 35mm stem of the film and for the first time features the music as originally heard in theaters and on the earliest VHS releases of the film.

Lacking a symphonic soundtrack, the film's score consists of a piano melody played in a 10/8 or "complex 5/4" time signature, composed and performed by director Carpenter. He admitted that the music was inspired by Dario Argento's Suspiria (which also influenced the film's slightly surreal color scheme) and William Friedkin's The Exorcist. Carpenter composed the entire soundtrack in just three days. Beyond the film's critical and commercial success, Carpenter's Halloween Theme became recognizable far beyond the movie itself.

Critic James Berardinelli described the soundtrack as "relatively simple and unsophisticated" but acknowledged that "Halloween's music is one of its strongest assets." In an interview, Carpenter confessed, "I can play just about any keyboard, but I can't read or write a note." At the end of the credits, Carpenter humorously credits himself as the "Bowling Green Philharmonic Orchestra" for the film's soundtrack but received assistance from composer Dan Wyman, a music professor at San Jose State University.

The soundtrack would later play a major role in influencing the synthwave music genre.

Some additional songs are featured in the film, including an untitled track performed by Carpenter and a group of friends who formed a band called The Coupe De Villes. Another notable song in the film is "(Don't Fear) The Reaper" by the classic rock band Blue Öyster Cult.

== Track listing ==
All music is composed by John Carpenter.

1983 release
No.	Title	Length
1.	"Halloween Theme – Main Title"	2:54
2.	"Laurie's Theme"	2:05
3.	"Shape Escapes"	1:42
4.	"Myers' House"	5:35
5.	"Michael Kills Judith"	3:11
6.	"Loomis and Shape's Car"	3:32
7.	"The Haunted House"	3:33
8.	"The Shape Lurks"	1:35
9.	"Laurie Knows"	3:01
10.	"Better Check the Kids"	3:27
11.	"The Shape Stalks"	3:08
Total length:		33:43

20th Anniversary Edition
No.	Title	Length
1.	"Halloween Theme"	2:21
2.	"Halloween 1963"	3:11
3.	"The Evil Is Gone!"	4:08
4.	"Halloween 1978"	2:50
5.	"The Boogeyman Is Coming"	0:40
6.	"The Shape"	1:43
7.	"The Hedge"	1:35
8.	"He Came Home"	2:40
9.	"Trick or Treat"	0:39
10.	"The Haunted House"	1:43
11.	"The Devil's Eyes"	1:39
12.	"The Boogeyman Is Outside"	1:27
13.	"Damn You for Letting Him Go!"	1:34
14.	"Empty Street"	0:33
15.	"See Anything You Like?"	2:22
16.	"Lock the Door"	2:53
17.	"He's Here?"	0:55
18.	"Light's Out"	2:49
19.	"Cut It Out"	1:19
20.	"Tombstone"	1:19
21.	"The Shape Stalks Laurie"	1:35
22.	"Turn Around"	0:33
23.	"Unlock the Door"	2:53
24.	"The Hanger"	3:04
25.	"Call the Police"	0:28
26.	"Last Assault"	1:34
27.	"Was It the Boogeyman?"	0:32
28.	"End Credits/Halloween Theme (Reprise)"	3:36
Total length:		51:51

40th Anniversary Edition
No.	Title	Length
1.	"Halloween Theme"	2:21
2.	"Michael Kills Judith"	3:38
3.	"Shape Escape"	1:40
4.	"Myers' House"	4:07
5.	"Shape in the Shadows"	2:47
6.	"Laurie's Theme"	2:31
7.	"Nightfall in Haddonfield"	3:04
8.	"Backyard"	1:48
9.	"Killing Spree"	2:39
10.	"Run and Hide"	4:43
11.	"Love Death"	2:44
12.	"Shadowed Streets"	2:19
13.	"The Shape Stalking"	2:40
14.	"He's in the House"	4:14
15.	"Was it the Boogie Man"	1:07
16.	"Halloween Theme (Reprise)"	3:36
Total length:		45:58

== Personnel ==
- John Carpenter – composition, performance
- Dan Wyman – synthesizer programming
- Peter Bergren – recording engineer

== Bibliography ==
- Burnand, David; Mena, Miguel (2004). "Fast and Cheap? The Film Music of John Carpenter". The Cinema of John Carpenter: The Technique of Terror. London: Wallflower Press. pp. 49–65. ISBN 978-1-904-76414-4.
- Larson, Randall D. (1985). Musique Fantastique: A Survey of Film Music in the Fantastic Cinema. Lanham, Maryland: Scarecrow Press. ISBN 978-0-810-81728-9.
