= Milk (soundtrack) =

Milk (Original Motion Picture Soundtrack)

Soundtrack album by Danny Elfman
- Released: November 18, 2008
- Recorded: 2008
- Genre: Film score
- Length: 58:34
- Label: Decca
- Producer: Danny Elfman

Danny Elfman chronology
Hellboy II: The Golden Army (2008)	Milk (2008)	Notorious (2009)

Milk (Original Motion Picture Soundtrack) is the soundtrack to the 2008 film of the same name, featuring musical score composed by Danny Elfman and a selection of contemporary pop hits. The album was released on November 18, 2008 through Decca Records to critical acclaim and received nominations at various ceremonies, including an Academy Award nomination.

== Reception ==
Michael G. Nastos, in his review for AllMusic gave three-and-a-half stars out of five to the album, and wrote "the pieces Elfman has composed bear a strong resemblance to that of the minimalist music of Philip Glass, at times in melancholy preludes to dramatic circumstance, and eventually victory. A reserved mood is held throughout the film, as if anticipation of these breakthrough events is tempered by the feeling that battle lines are being drawn, and there are huge obstacles to overcome under a hopeful horizon. Elfman's music is at once serene, a bit ominous, foreboding, and marginally triumphant." Thomas Glorieux of Maintitles.net commented "Milk is one of the many examples of musical scores that stands for what filmmusic is today. Lovely and well written, but not classic so that you won't remember it that easy after a week. It nonetheless made the year of Elfman complete, and it secured him back in the saddle once again. Milk is definitely one of the more appreciated works of the year 2008, and any fan wanting a little Elfman magic will find this lightly example pleasantly hidden in a carton of Milk."

James Southall of Movie Wave commented "Milk is a really fine score from Elfman, certainly deserving of the plaudits it's attracted; and if he continues into 2009 in the kind of form he found himself during 2008, then we're in for a real treat." Music critic Jonathan Broxton wrote "It's not a score which has big themes, or even especially big moments of emotional catharsis. It's not even Elfman's best score of 2008 – that accolade goes to his documentary score, Standard Operating Procedure. What Milk does do, however, is further illustrate the increasing maturation of Elfman as a dramatic film composer, with the musical chops to write successful, appropriate, intelligent music across a variety of genres, and for this reason alone comes recommended."

Filmtracks.com wrote "there is much to admire about Elfman's work for Milk; it is a satisfying conclusion to a very strong year for the composer. But while he hits all the right notes in terms of balancing personality with history, there is an intangible sense of weight missing from this score. Elfman sacrifices gravity for intimacy, partly in the composition and partly in his close recording mix of the performance."

== Track listing ==
No.	Title	Artist(s)	Length
1.	"Queen Bitch"	David Bowie	3:14
2.	"Everyday People"	Sly and the Family Stone	2:21
3.	"Rock the Boat"	The Hues Corporation	3:18
4.	"You Make Me Feel (Mighty Real)"	Sylvester	6:34
5.	"Hello, Hello"	Sopwith Camel	2:24
6.	"Prelude No.7 in E flat" (The Well-Tempered Clavier – Book 2 BWV 876)	The Swingles	2:39
7.	"Harvey's Theme 1"	Danny Elfman	1:11
8.	"Main Titles" (Soundtrack Version)	Danny Elfman	3:06
9.	"Harvey's Will"	Danny Elfman	1:41
10.	"The Castro"	Danny Elfman	0:59
11.	"The Kiss"	Danny Elfman	0:45
12.	"Politics Is Theater"	Danny Elfman	3:15
13.	"New Hope"	Danny Elfman	1:46
14.	"Harvey Wins"	Danny Elfman	0:31
15.	"Proposition 6"	Danny Elfman	1:25
16.	"Repealed Rights"	Danny Elfman	1:03
17.	"Gay Rights Now!"	Danny Elfman	2:20
18.	"Dog Poo"	Danny Elfman	0:25
19.	"Vote Passes"	Danny Elfman	0:53
20.	"Briggs Pushing"	Danny Elfman	0:44
21.	"The Debates"	Danny Elfman	2:48
22.	"Weepy Donuts"	Danny Elfman	0:52
23.	"Harvey's Last Day"	Danny Elfman	3:11
24.	"Give 'Em Hope"	Danny Elfman	4:42
25.	"Postscript"	Danny Elfman	2:03
26.	"Harvey's Theme 2"	Danny Elfman	1:00
27.	"Anita's Theme" (Bonus Track)	Danny Elfman	0:52
28.	"Main Titles Sax Solo" (Bonus Track)	Danny Elfman	2:32
Total length:			58:34

== Accolades ==
Award	Category	Name	Outcome
81st Academy Awards	Best Original Score	Danny Elfman	Nominated
14th BFCA Critic's Choice Awards	Best Composer	Danny Elfman	Nominated
21st Chicago Film Critics Association Awards	Best Original Score	Danny Elfman	Nominated
5th International Film Music Critics Association Awards	Best Original Score for a Drama Film	Danny Elfman	Nominated
13th Satellite Awards	Best Original Score	Danny Elfman	Nominated

== Personnel ==
Credits adapted from AllMusic.

- A&R administration – Evelyn Morgan
- A&R direction – Brian Drutman
- Art direction and design – Carla Leighton
- Choir – Metro Voices, Reigate St. Mary's Choir School
- Music composed and produced by – Danny Elfman
- Conductor – Rick Wentworth
- Contractor – Isobel Griffiths
- Assistant contractor – Charlotte Matthews
- Soundtrack co-ordinator – Paul Altomari, Tom Arndt
- Creative director – Fanny Gotschall
- Choir director – John Tobin
- Choirmaster – Jenny O'Grady
- Edited by – Bill Abbott
- Orchestra leader – Thomas Bowes
- Music business affairs – Sheryl Gold
- Mastered by – Patricia Sullivan Fourstar
- Mixed by – Dennis Sands
- Musician – Ian Balmain, John Parricelli, Nicholas Bucknall, Phil Todd
- Orchestrated by – David Slonaker, Edgardo Simone, Jeff Atmajian, Marc Mann, Steve Bartek
- Photography by – Phil Bray
- Recorded by – Peter Cobbin
- Supervised by – Jill Meyers
