= Annihilation (soundtrack) =

Annihilation (Music from the Motion Picture)

Film score by Ben Salisbury and Geoff Barrow
- Released: February 23, 2018
- Recorded: 2016–2018
- Studios: Air-Edel; Invada; Optimum Mastering
- Genre: Film score
- Length: 82:14
- Labels: Lakeshore; Invada

Ben Salisbury chronology
Free Fire (Original Motion Picture Soundtrack) (2017)	Annihilation (Music from the Motion Picture) (2018)	Hanna (2019)

Geoff Barrow chronology
Free Fire (Original Motion Picture Soundtrack) (2017)	Annihilation (Music from the Motion Picture) (2018)	>>> (2018)

Annihilation (Music from the Motion Picture) is the soundtrack to the 2018 science fiction film Annihilation, directed by Alex Garland. The film score is composed by Ben Salisbury and Geoff Barrow and released through Lakeshore Records in the United States, and Invada Records in the United Kingdom on February 23, 2018.

== Development ==
In August 2016, it was announced that Ben Salisbury and Geoff Barrow would compose the musical score for the film; the duo previously worked with Garland on their debut film Ex Machina (2014). The duo worked on the film's musical score for a year. According to Salisbury, as the film "vaguely references – like Southern Comfort – those searching-in-jungles-and-backwoods-of-America-type films, it just felt right to put acoustic guitar there." Examining the psychedelic nature of the film, Salisbury had to utilize synthesizers in a distorted effect to provide thrills as the characters' DNA being affected by "the shimmer" (the mysterious place the characters visit). Salisbury and Barrow had to compose a bigger cue that represent the mystic place. They had written five different versions of the score, but at one point, the four notes of that theme existed throughout the score in an orchestral version, and they did not use synthesizers. In the final version, the theme was used harmonically throughout orchestral theme and used an acoustic guitar that heard throughout the film. However, the version used in the trailer had them using synthesizers and being put through various processes which led to the said version.

The thematic approach was the same way the duo did for Ex Machina. Salisbury recalled that when they first saw the alien sequence in the lighthouse, they were "blown away" and composed a choral arrangement for the 12-15-minute-long sequence. The piece "The Alien" had four sections, where the duo conjointly scored the orchestral parts, and separately scored the electronic and choral parts, respectively and stitched the pieces. From the onset, they refrained from the use of synthesizers. The duo used a waterphone to produce weird noises in the early part of the film, as it referenced Lalo Schifrin's score for Dirty Harry (1971) in the sound effects. However, they tried to bring a waterphone choir out of it, hence, Salisbury would sing the notes in the control room and Barrow would bow that tone out of it, which was like a steel octopus. He added "Because it's not tunable, it would never produce perfect results, it always wobbled and was weird," which eventually made as the perfect tune for the Shimmer.

Since they recorded most of the portion without synthesizers, they however found that the lighthouse scene felt suitable for using the electronics. The four-note bed that composed for the score was produced with the sound of waterphone and strings interspersed with guitar elements. The theme was a bigger cue in the original version which Garland wanted to use in the climax, so as to get the desired impact. The proper use of themes helped them on the scoring process.

== Release ==
The soundtrack album was distributed by Lakeshore Records in the United States and Invada Records in the United Kingdom on February 23, 2018, coinciding with the film's release, and was later made available in CDs and vinyl LPs. The album's track listing order unfolds in the same sequence as the music in the film, as the score had a journey of narrative arc. Salisbury added that by not replicating the narrative arc on the record, it makes it difficult to listen for those who have not seen the film. This process would help the audiences to like the music, the same way they liked the film.

== Reception ==
=== Critical reception ===
Annihilation's score was positively received by music critics. Aaron Vehling of Vehlinggo wrote "On Annihilation, Barrow and Salisbury achieve this profoundly and with great reward for listeners and, notably, filmgoers." Kaya Savas of Film.Music.Media called it as a "much more daring and more complex experience" in comparison with the duo's previous album Ex Machina. Rob Wacey of AllMusic wrote "The score for Annihilation is a refreshing listen for soundtrack aficionados and proves that Salisbury and Barrow have plenty of tricks up their sleeves as innovative composers." Pete Simons of Synchrotones gave a negative review, summarizing "other than unease, they offer no emotion, no storytelling, no dramatic arch."

Film critics, however, responded to the score more positively. Todd McCarthy of The Hollywood Reporter wrote "The rumbling, churning electronic score by Ben Salisbury and Portishead's Geoff Barrow, who previously collaborated on the score to Ex Machina, finds a path directly to the viewer's anxiety button and presses it incessantly." Ann Hornaday of The Washington Post wrote the film's "meditative tone deepened by Geoff Barrow and Ben Salisbury's counterintuitive score, composed largely of soothing acoustic guitar riffs, rather than the usual synthesized bloops and beeps." Kimberly Jones of The Austin Chronicle, reviewed that it "adds an emotional complexity with its mix of heartland guitar, spooky AF strings, and submerged-sounding synths."

Julian Roman of MovieWeb called that the score was instrumental in building anxiety with the use of "odd sound effects, followed by guitar melodies to alternately creep; then lull before pivotal scenes. It's a winning combination that delivers some first-rate scares." Henry Stewart of Slant Magazine wrote "Geoff Barrow and Ben Salisbury's score evokes that unsteady imbalance, mixing acoustic, finger-pickin' folk with dissonant droning, respectively evoking the organic and the inhuman."

=== Best-of lists ===
- 8th – David Ehrlich, IndieWire
- 26th – Jeremy D. Larson, Pitchfork (top 50)
- Honourable mention – Adam Chitwood, Collider
- Bilge Ebiri, Vulture (sorted alphabetically)
- Claire Lobenfeld and John Twells, Fact (sorted alphabetically)

== Controversy ==
On January 31, 2019, rapper Lil Pump released the single "Racks on Racks" from his second studio album Harverd Dropout (2019). Two days later, Barrow through his Twitter (now X) account, accused him of sampling the track "The Alien" for the song "Racks on Racks" without his permission and also criticized the song for its sexist lyrics.

== Track listing ==
Disc 1 track listing
No.	Title	Length
1.	"What Do You Know?"	2:36
2.	"Ambulance Chase"	2:58
3.	"Approaching the Shimmer"	1:52
4.	"Disoriented"	2:37
5.	"The Alligator"	1:02
6.	"For Those That Follow"	2:48
7.	"The Swimming Pool"	2:57
8.	"The Watchtower"	2:08
9.	"Sheppard"	2:45
10.	"The Body"	2:04
11.	"Plant People"	2:44
12.	"Cells Divide"	1:37
13.	"The Bear"	4:52
14.	"The Beach"	4:23
15.	"Were You Me?"	3:03
16.	"Lighthouse Chamber"	2:05
17.	"The Alien"	12:03
18.	"Annihilation"	5:22
Total length:		59:56

Disc 2 track listing
No.	Title	Length
1.	"The Beach" (alternate version)	2:52
2.	"Coma"	2:27
3.	"Southern Reach Questioning"	2:06
4.	"Shimmer Reveal"	0:38
5.	"Abandoned Army Base"	2:10
6.	"Camp Awakening"	0:35
7.	"Two Theories"	2:12
8.	"In All of Us"	1:46
9.	"We Are Headed That Way"	2:10
10.	"End Titles" (alternate version)	1:18
11.	"End Credits" (alternate version)	4:04
Total length:		22:18

== Personnel ==
Credits adapted from liner notes.

- Ben Salisbury – composer, producer, guitar, percussion, electronics
- Geoff Barrow – composer, producer, guitar, percussion, electronics
- Jerry Crozier-Cole – guitar
- Alison Garner – vocals
- Charlotte Newstead – vocals
- Judith Ogden – vocals
- Chamber Orchestra of London – strings
- RSVP Singers – choir
- Elizabeth Purnell – orchestrator, conductor
- Gareth Griffiths – contractor
- Simon Ashdown – sound design
- Stuart Mattews – recording
- Nick Taylor – recording
- James Trevascus – recording assistance
- Adam Miller – recording assistance
- Shawn Joseph – mastering
- Rupert Coulson – mixing
- Yann McCullough – music editor
- Darrell Alexander – score coordinator
- Jason Richmond – album coordinator
- John Bergin – art direction
- Brian McNelis – executive producer
- Skip Williamson – executive producer
- Scott Rudin – executive producer
- Randy Spendlove – executive in charge of music

== Accolades ==
Accolades for Annihilation (Music from the Motion Picture)
Award	Date of ceremony	Category	Result	Ref.
Austin Film Critics Association	January 7, 2019	Best Original Score	Nominated	
Florida Film Critics Circle	December 21, 2018	Best Score	Nominated	
Georgia Film Critics Association	December 1, 2018	Best Original Score	Nominated	
International Cinephile Society	February 4, 2019	Best Original Score	Nominated	
St. Louis Film Critics Association	December 16, 2018	Best Score	Nominated	

== Release history ==
Release history for Annihilation (Music from the Motion Picture)
Region	Date	Format(s)	Label	Ref.
Various	February 23, 2018	Digital download; streaming	Lakeshore; Invada	
Various	April 13, 2018	CD	Lakeshore; Invada	
Various	August 3, 2018	vinyl	Lakeshore; Invada	
