= Tár (album) =

2022 album by Hildur Guðnadóttir

Tár (Music from and Inspired by the Motion Picture)

Studio album / soundtrack album by Hildur Guðnadóttir
- Released: October 21, 2022
- Recorded: 2021–2022
- Studio: Abbey Road Studios, London
- Genre: Classical; orchestral
- Length: 1:03:51
- Label: Deutsche Grammophon
- Producer: Hildur Guðnadóttir; Todd Field; Francesco Donadello; Job Maarse; Rachel Smith

Hildur Guðnadóttir chronology
Joker (2019)	Tár (2022)	Women Talking (2022)

Tár (Music from and Inspired by the Motion Picture) is a concept album consisting of 20 tracks, curated, composed, and produced by Icelandic musician Hildur Guðnadóttir. Featuring contributions from Cate Blanchett and cellist Sophie Kauer, and performances from Dresden Philharmonic, London Contemporary Orchestra (conducted by Robert Ames), and London Symphony Orchestra, many of the tracks on the album, along with several others, served as the soundtrack to Todd Field's 2022 psychological drama film, Tár, starring Blanchett in the lead role as Lydia Tár. Hildur's original music acts as the centrepiece of the album. The album was ruled ineligible for an Oscar nomination, as the content does not accurately reflect the music featured in the film.

The album was digitally released under the Deutsche Grammophon label on October 21, 2022, (two weeks after the film's limited release) and was released on vinyl on January 20, 2023. The album received positive responses by critics, praising Hildur's composition, production, and engineering, and topped the Billboard Traditional Classical Albums from the week beginning November 5, 2022, ahead of albums released during the period by the actual Berlin Philharmonic.

== Concept album ==
The album, titled Tár (Music from and Inspired by the Motion Picture) is a concept album. It includes new music by Hildur Guðnadóttir as well as extracts of various works by Mahler and Edward Elgar. The online film music listings show over 30 tracks featured in the film.

The album is a listening experience of what Field referring the film as "the messiness of the work involved in preparing classical music for performance", which involves a combination of audio glimpses from real-life recording sessions, sequences from fictional rehearsals, music listened to by the film's characters, and completed versions of the music on which Lydia Tár had worked on. The cover of the recording is a nod to the photograph used for Claudio Abbado's 1993 Berlin recording of Gustav Mahler's Symphony No. 5. It does not include all of the tracks featured in the film, and does include some that are not used in the film.

Blanchett performed and conducted Mahler's Symphony No. 5 in collaboration with the Dresden Philharmonic and concertmaster Wolfgang Hentrich; she felt "blessed to have her name featured in a talented assembly as a musician". She also performed on piano the Prelude in C major from Johann Sebastian Bach's The Well-Tempered Clavier as a part of Tár's teaching sessions. Extracts from Edward Elgar's Cello Concerto, performed by Sophie Kauer who plays the role of Russian cellist Olga Metkina, (a cellist in real life), along with the London Symphony Orchestra, conducted by Natalie Murray Beale. In addition to the classical pieces, the album featured jazz compositions: Jimmy Van Heusen and Johnny Burke's "Here's That Rainy Day" – performed by the New Trombone Collective with soloist Al Kay, conducted by Martijn Sohler, and "Cura mente" by shaman Elisa Vargas Fernández, which was used to "illustrate Tár's history in Shipibo-Konibo ethnomusicological fieldwork".

Hildur's new music created for the film serves as the central to both the film as well as the album. The album's introductory cue is a voice memo she sang to provide the main melody titled "For Petra", which is the music featured in the final session. A part of the recording session for the orchestral version, performed by the London Contemporary Orchestra and conducted by Robert Ames, is also included. Another piece written by Hildur is "Mortar", which she performed on cello.

== Production ==
Hildur was involved in the project after Field's persistence on the importance of the film's music. The original score was recorded at the Abbey Road Studios in London, England. The album is a combination of audio glimpses from real-life recording sessions, sequences from fictional rehearsals, music listened by the film's characters and completed versions of the film's music, created by Lydia Tár in fiction. Recordings of classical pieces – Gustav Mahler's Symphony No. 5, Edward Elgar's Cello Concerto and Johann Sebastian Bach's The Well-Tempered Clavier – and non-classical compositions: the jazz song "Here's That Rainy Day" and "Cura Mente" were also included, whereas Hildur's original music acts as the centrepiece of the album.

The original score is composed by Hildur Guðnadóttir, who was reported to be the second person to be involved after the leading actress, Blanchett. Hildur had earlier been roped in for David O. Russell's Amsterdam (2022), prior to scoring for Tár, and had left the former project to focus on the latter. (She was eventually replaced on Amsterdam by Daniel Pemberton.) While reading the script, she felt that Field had authentically pictured on the life of composers and conductors in real life in the modern-day world, saying "There's a lot of how the character is that's very different from my musical world and my musical landscape. But I think that for a certain type of musician, I think he came pretty close." Field wanted her involvement in the process, as music was important and the film is about "the psychological and emotional aspects of what it is to rehearse music, what it is to write music, like what it is to be frustrated with that process, to be really encapsulated by it – or what happens if you're misaligned in your process."

Hildur explained that writing the score for the film was a three-fold process. While working on the script, she met Field multiple times during the location scoutings, discussing on the use of tempo and BPM for sequences and characters, and then tempo-mapped the film. Later, she wrote music that the main character Lydia Tár (Blanchett) was writing on the film, and witnessed her progress, but Hildur opined that they cannot hear the final version of the music she was writing in the film, but ended up finishing the music that she wrote on a record and played it in the final film. The final phase it to write the actual score of the film, different from the daily rehearsal and orchestra space, that Tár lives in her day-to-day world. She further added that the score "lives in a realm that is more than the subconscious level, the otherworldly place where you're not sure exactly what is real and who is who. There's actually an incredible amount of score in the film, but the audience probably won't notice it as much. It's like having a ghost in the room that you can't see, but you can feel."

My initial reaction can be heard in the melody that [Lydia is] writing, because that is the thread that follows her throughout the entire film. It's this one melody that she's trying to figure out. [It was] the first thing that came to me musically, and it came to me almost immediately after I read the script. And then it was a dialogue [between us]. Because this is a film about process, it was really important to Todd that the film was also a process – he didn't want to go in and be like, This is how it is. The film had room to change a lot; it's probably very different to what we set out to do in the first place. But that was the beauty of it.

— Hildur Guðnadóttir, on creating music for the film, after the screenplay.

On setting the tone for Tár, she said that "the big frustration in her life, is that she's not really living according to what she really wants to be doing. Her passion in music and her passion in life is totally different from what she's actually spending most of her days." She felt that Lydia Tár wanted to take her compositional work in an experimental directions in the line of Charles Ives or Henryk Górecki. But, the character ends up getting drawn into a classical world, where "she feels that she needs to be really strong and powerful and angry, where she has to kind of take everyone on head first. And the conflict in her life comes from these paths not aligning, you know, and not managing to marry each other." Hildur felt that she was misaligned, which forces her back in the first place. Hence, she thought that writing that music, Tár was writing and accessing the mindset on how her lifestyle should be, sets the tone of the film, which felt that was informative on the character building.

The track "For Petra" is the only piece Hildur wrote that was included in the final credits. Hildur said that it was the piece Tár wrote for the film and the first she thought on reading the script, saying "in the script she was working on this melody that she's exploring, and she's trying to find her way to the right way of this melody, or finding the path that this melody wants to go to". Hence, the cue ends up as the main theme that led the whole film. She also sang few melodic pieces, recording her voice in a phone. She disregarded on how her voice meant to replicate Tár, but added that it is the voice of how the music comes to the viewer, and feels as the sound of Tár; she felt that a lot of music she heard has been written for other instruments, which ends up being not her voice, but felt interesting on how the process has been analyzed, and how music comes to an individual, in his/her day-to-day life. She added that, "there are elements that this character [Tár] hears where she's not sure if it's music or if it's some other sound, whether it's irritating or scary. She's someone that hears sounds really loud, you know so there's a lot of sounds that she experiences", opining that her voice lives in that space.

== Track listing ==
No.	Title	Writer(s)	Performer(s)/Conductor(s)	Length
1.	"For Petra" (vocal version)	Hildur Guðnadóttir	Hildur Guðnadóttir	1:11
2.	"Mortar"	Hildur Guðnadóttir	Guðnadóttir; London Contemporary Orchestra	3:36
3.	"Introductory Words by Hildur Guðnadóttir"		Hildur Guðnadóttir	0:19
4.	"For Petra" (recording session)	Hildur Guðnadóttir	London Contemporary; Robert Ames	8:18
5.	"Hildur's Impressions"		Hildur Guðnadóttir	0:14
6.	"Tár: I. Largo"	Hildur Guðnadóttir	London Contemporary	5:44
7.	"Tár: II. Allegro"	Hildur Guðnadóttir	London Contemporary	4:14
8.	"Tár: III. Moderato"	Hildur Guðnadóttir	London Contemporary	4:56
9.	"Symphony No. 5 in C-sharp minor / Pt. 1: I. Trauermarsch & II. Stürmisch bewegt" (rehearsals)	Gustav Mahler	Cate Blanchett; Jan Wolf; Dresden Philharmonic	3:19
10.	"Symphony No. 5 in C-sharp minor / Pt. 3: IV. Adagietto" (rehearsals)	Mahler	Blanchett; Dresdner Philharmonie	4:24
11.	"Introductory Words" (recording session)		Rachel Smith; Natalie Murray Beale; Sophie Kauer	0:21
12.	"Elgar: Cello Concerto in E minor, Op. 85: IV. Allegro" (recording session / first take / excerpt)	Edward Elgar	London Symphony Orchestra; Beale; Kauer	1:32
13.	"Control Room Talk" (recording session)		Smith; Beale; Kauer; Todd Field	1:19
14.	"Cello Concerto in E minor, Op. 85: IV. Allegro" (recording session)	Elgar	London Symphony; Beale; Kauer	12:08
15.	"Applause" (recording session)		Smith; Beale	0:20
16.	"Cello Concerto in E minor, Op. 85: I. Adagio – Moderato" (recording session / excerpt)	Elgar	London Symphony; Beale; Kauer	3:44
17.	"Here's That Rainy Day"	Jimmy Van Heusen; Johnny Burke	Al Kay; Martijn Sohier; New Trombone Collective	2:41
18.	"Prelude in C major, BWV 846 from The Well-Tempered Clavier" (lesson / excerpt)	Johann Sebastian Bach	Blanchett; Zethphan Smith-Gneist	1:27
19.	"Lydia Tár Field Recording"		Blanchett; Elisa Vargas Fernandez	0:30
20.	"Cura mente"	Fernandez	Fernandez	3:14

== Release and reception ==
On 2 September 2022, Variety announced the film's concept album that featured 20 tracks, running for an hour long. Deutsche Grammophon published the concept album on 21 October 2022, two weeks after the film's US theatrical release on 7 October.

A vinyl edition of the album was released on January 20, 2023.

The album topped the Billboard Traditional Classical Albums from the week beginning November 5, 2022, ahead of albums released during the period by the actual Berlin Philharmonic.

=== Critical response ===
Hildur's score received critical acclaim, A. O. Scott from The New York Times and Richard Lawson of Vanity Fair called the score one of the best aspects of the film. David Rooney of The Hollywood Reporter wrote that "the score by composer Hildur Guðnadóttir brings subtle indications of the influences Lydia is hearing in her own compositions, elegantly interwoven with the classical pieces — primarily Mahler and Elgar." Mae Abdulbaki of Screen Rant called the score "spectacular" and "crucial to the film's execution". David Ehrlich of IndieWire wrote, "Hildur Guðnadóttir's unobtrusive score helps to smooth over the seams even as Lydia comes apart on screen." Ann Hornaday of The Washington Post commented, "the musical score is composed by Hildur Gudnadóttir, who's also name-checked by Lydia – a choice that emphasizes Lydia's own hypersensitivity to the ambient sounds that constantly threaten to engulf her".

In an article published by Variety, Hildur Guðnadóttir's score for Tár was considered as an eligible contender for nominations at the 95th Academy Awards held in March 2023. A representative from Focus Features confirmed to the magazine, saying that the film's music meets the requirement for the Academy Awards, and will be submitted for consideration. IndieWire had mixed opinions regarding the consideration of Academy Award submission, despite predicting the eligibility of Hildur's score as the criteria for original score requirements has lowered to 35 percent from the initial 60 percent. The article further states the complication is mostly due to the intentional mixing of the score with the pre-existing material, which was done "to convey the otherworldly mindscape of Tár, who struggles with maintaining her position of power while fending off cancel culture threats". It further estimated that such a notion would not sit well with the Academy. In December 2022, the album was ruled ineligible from Oscar consideration.

== Charts ==
Chart performance for Tár (Music from and Inspired by the Motion Picture)
Chart (2022)	Peak position
US Traditional Classical Albums (Billboard)	1

== Music video ==
Field also directed a music video of "Mortar". It premiered on November 10, 2022, and as of December 2022 had over one million views on DG's YouTube channel. The idea of filming the piece, originated from conversations with Field and Blanchett, as "this piece of film conceived as an in-between place for the main character to fall into herself. A place where the natural laws of her waking state do not apply". It was shot parallel to the film's principal photography in Berlin and parts of Southeast Asia. Additional filming with Field and Hildur took place back in Berlin at the end of September 2022.
