= Emma (2020 soundtrack) =

Emma. (Original Motion Picture Soundtrack)

Soundtrack album by Isobel Waller-Bridge and David Schweitzer
- Released: February 14, 2020
- Recorded: 2019–2020
- Genres: Film score; classical
- Length: 49:38
- Label: Back Lot Music
- Producers: Isobel Waller-Bridge; David Schweitzer

Isobel Waller-Bridge chronology
Vita & Virginia (2018)	Emma. (2020)	Munich – The Edge of War (2021)

David Schweitzer chronology
Aliens Love Underpants And... Panta Claus (2018)	Emma. (2020)	The Rise of the Murdoch Dynasty (2020)

Emma. (Original Motion Picture Soundtrack) is the soundtrack album to the 2020 film Emma, directed by Autumn de Wilde, based on Jane Austen's 1815 novel of the same name. Starring Anya Taylor-Joy in the titular role, alongside Johnny Flynn, Josh O'Connor, Callum Turner, Mia Goth, Miranda Hart, and Bill Nighy. The soundtrack, accompanying the film, consists of acappella recordings of folk and classical songs, performed by Maddy Prior, June Tabor, The Watersons, The Carnival Band and The Cambridge Singers. The cast members Johnny Flynn and Amber Anderson, also performed few numbers in the album. The former, also wrote an original song for the film, in addition to the incorporated classical songs. The rest of the album, consists of the original score composed by Isobel Waller-Bridge and David Schweitzer. The 35-track album was released by Back Lot Music digitally on February 14, 2020 and in physical formats on February 21. A vinyl edition of the soundtrack was published and released by Mondo on May 15, 2020.

== Background ==
The director Autumn de Wilde, who previously worked as a photographer and directed music videos, felt on the importance of folk music in the film. Having previously worked with musicians Beck, Jenny Lewis and the band Death Cab for Cutie, de Wilde had learned about the history of folk music in America, England, Ireland, and other countries. She roped in Isobel Waller-Bridge for scoring the film, after appreciating her composition for Fleabag, as she felt that she had a "sense of humor in music". She wanted the music to be like "a misbehaving orchestra, like the conductor is overwhelmed and the oboes are escaping", and wanted the score to emulate Sergei Prokofiev's Peter and the Wolf, where each character had a theme that personified them.

Emma. marked Waller-Bridge's second stint on writing diegetic music, after previously doing the same for Fleabag, as while comparing both the films, "it was really important to be able to show a humanity behind those protagonists. And it felt like vocal music in those cases was going to really help us do that." She denied comparisons of her score, with Rachel Portman's Academy Award-winning score for Emma (1996), and felt it as a unique album because of de Wilde's direction. She co-composed the score with David Schweitzer, and was conducted by Alastair King along with the Chamber Orchestra of London. Explaining the importance of the score, Waller-Bridge added "Autumn wanted it to feel live, so the conductor would be conducting to the action in real time. That's why we wanted the music to spot even the tiniest bits of detail like an eyebrow raise. It was almost like a silent movie. If you took the dialogue off, you'd still really have a sense of what was going on." She also interpreted Benjamin Britten's The Young Person's Guide to the Orchestra and Modest Mussorgsky's Pictures at an Exhibition, in addition to Profokiev's piece to be versed about classical music for the film.

In addition to the score, the film also featured a cappella recordings of folk songs with several artists such as, Maddy Prior, June Tabor and the Watersons, along with the bands The Carnival Band and The Cambridge Singers. Anya Taylor-Joy, Johnny Flynn and Amber Anderson performed the songs on-screen in the film. In the film, Jane Fairfax (Anderson) outshines Emma (Taylor-Joy) by performing the third movement from Mozart's Piano Sonata No. 12 on the fortepiano. A trained pianist, Anderson had to relearn the piece to adapt her technique to the period instrument's short keys, and she felt that "it is very rare that a pianist gets to play on one of those and it was amazing to play music written by composers like [Wolfgang Amadeus] Mozart on that instrument, how it was meant to sound".

Johnny Flynn was asked by Waller-Bridge to write a song to convey Knightley's perspective on Emma, which would later become "Queen Bee", an original song for the film featured in the end credits. He also performed the song in a style appropriate to the film's period. He also performed another song, a duet with Anderson, titled "'Drink to Me Only With Thine Eyes", written by Ben Jonson in the film during a ball scene. Taylor-Joy performed the song "The Last Rose of Summer", who opined that she used an affective style imagining Emma Woodhouse would use to charm her audience. Both the songs, despite being in the film, were not included in the soundtrack album.

== Track listing ==
No.	Title	Performer(s)	Length
1.	"Emma Woodhouse"	Isobel Waller-Bridge; David Schweitzer	1:48
2.	"Poor Miss Taylor"	Waller-Bridge; Schweitzer	1:41
3.	"Mr. Knightley"	Waller-Bridge; Schweitzer	1:39
4.	"Emma Is Bored"	Waller-Bridge; Schweitzer	0:44
5.	"Harriet Smith"	Waller-Bridge; Schweitzer	1:16
6.	"Country Life"	The Watersons	1:59
7.	"Harriet Smith and Robert Martin Meet On the Road"	Waller-Bridge; Schweitzer	1:09
8.	"How Firm a Foundation"	Maddy Prior; The Carnival Band	2:51
9.	"Mr. Elton Reveals the Portrait"	Waller-Bridge; Schweitzer	0:51
10.	"Hark! Hark What News"	Prior; The Carnival	1:43
11.	"Walk To Mrs. Goddard's School"	Waller-Bridge; Schweitzer	0:36
12.	"Christmas Dinner At the Weston's"	Waller-Bridge; Schweitzer	1:22
13.	"O Waly, Waly"	John Rutter; The Cambridge Singers	2:45
14.	"You Must Sample the Tart"	Waller-Bridge; Schweitzer	0:43
15.	"Jane Fairfax Plays Mozart Sonata in F"	Amber Anderson	1:46
16.	"Harriet Smith and Robert Martin Meet In the Rain"	Waller-Bridge; Schweitzer	1:50
17.	"Frank Churchill Arrives At Hartfield"	Waller-Bridge; Schweitzer	1:42
18.	"We Cannot Do Without Dancing"	Waller-Bridge; Schweitzer	0:54
19.	"Supper Party At the Coles"	Waller-Bridge; Schweitzer	1:01
20.	"Mr. Knightley and Jane Fairfax Duet (Drink To Me Only With Thine Eyes)"	Johnny Flynn; Anderson	1:33
21.	"Mrs. Elton Arrives At Hartfield"	Waller-Bridge; Schweitzer	1:29
22.	"We Shall Have Our Ball"	Waller-Bridge; Schweitzer	1:21
23.	"Mr. Turner's Waltz"	Chamber Orchestra of London	2:09
24.	"Mr. Knightley Chases After Emma"	Waller-Bridge; Schweitzer	1:10
25.	"Mr. Knightley Is Destroyed"	Waller-Bridge; Schweitzer	0:55
26.	"Donwell Abbey (Haydn's Farewell Symphony)"	Anderson	1:42
27.	"Badly Done, Emma"	Waller-Bridge; Schweitzer	0:59
28.	"Jane Fairfax Plays Beethoven Sonata No. 23"	Anderson	0:57
29.	"Emma Is Lost"	Waller-Bridge; Schweitzer	1:06
30.	"The Proposal (Under the Horse Chestnut Tree)"	Waller-Bridge; Schweitzer	3:35
31.	"The Game of Cards"	Prior; June Tabor	3:20
32.	"A Chill Draft About the Knees"	Waller-Bridge; Schweitzer	1:05
33.	"Emma and Mr. Knightley (A Kiss Before They Wed)"	Waller-Bridge; Schweitzer	3:06
34.	"Queen Bee"	Flynn	3:38
35.	"Emma Suite"	Waller-Bridge; Schweitzer	6:07
Total length:			62:32

== Reception ==
The music received positive critical reception, with The Guardian's Peter Bradshaw calling the soundtrack as "frantically intrusive", while Mark Kermode "Musically, Emma. juxtaposes folk tunes with operatic voices as the action traverses social boundaries, with composers Isobel Waller-Bridge and David Schweitzer linking characters to instruments (a harp for Emma, a bassoon for Mr Knightley) in their cues. Live performances play a key role, too, from the piano duelling of Emma and Jane Fairfax (the multitalented Amber Anderson) to a duet in which Knightley sings and plays violin while Emma seethes silently from a distance." Luke Goodsell of ABC News called it as: "a soundtrack that mixes perky classical cues (Beethoven, Mozart) with folksy ballads".

CineVue's "David Schweitzer and Isobel Waller-Bridge's plinky-plonky score, insists a little too frequently in reminding the audience of its own light-heartedness instead of simply letting the tone speak for itself." David Ehrlich of IndieWire wrote "David Schweitzer and Isobel Waller-Bridge's minuet-like score might have felt oppressive had de Wilde not baked the music into each scene, so that every strut, smile, and touch is folded into a greater dance (rigid compositions help make de Wilde's frames seem like stages)." He further listed it as one of the "best film scores of 2020".

James Southall of Movie Wave wrote "it's gorgeous, sumptuous romantic music, starting with a piece of opera and never really letting up. It's extremely pretty, accomplished music with a surprising amount of period flair; tuneful, classically orchestrated, almost perennially happy. there's some very elegant instrumental music as well, both the somewhat inevitable cheery pizzicato strings and some more tender material. The score makes up just under 40 minutes of the album and the only real negative is that a number of cues are very short. There's real quality here so it's an easy recommendation to make." Jonathan Broxton wrote "Emma is certainly up there as one of the most accomplished and enjoyable comedy scores in quite some time. The music has that quintessential English period sound so beloved of the BBC, and of films based on works by Austen and the Bronte sisters. The orchestrations are beautiful, ranging from the effortlessly charming combination of strings and woodwinds, to the operatic vocals that soar. And the technical content of the score is outstanding too, with a strongly thematic approach."

== Chart performance ==
Chart (2020)	Peak position
UK Compilation Albums (OCC)	53
UK Soundtrack Albums (OCC)	23
US Billboard 200	99
US Soundtrack Albums (Billboard)	12
