= Women Talking (soundtrack) =

Women Talking (Original Motion Picture Soundtrack)

Soundtrack album by Hildur Guðnadóttir
- Released: 23 December 2022
- Recorded: 2022
- Genre: Film score
- Length: 26:33
- Label: Mercury Classics
- Producer: Hildur Guðnadóttir

Hildur Guðnadóttir chronology
Tár (2022)	Women Talking (2022)	A Haunting in Venice (2023)

Singles from Women Talking (Original Motion Picture Soundtrack)
- 1. "Speak Up" Released: 4 November 2022

Women Talking (Original Motion Picture Soundtrack) is the score album composed by Hildur Guðnadóttir for the 2022 film of the same name, directed by Sarah Polley, based on the 2018 novel of the same name by Miriam Toews. The film stars Rooney Mara, Claire Foy, Jessie Buckley, Judith Ivey, Ben Whishaw, and Frances McDormand, who also serves as the producer. Hildur described the score as one of the optimistic music, she composed for a horrific subject which is relevant in the current period, referring to sexual assault against women. Hildur collaborates with Skúli Sverrisson who provides guitar solos.

The soundtrack was released by Mercury Classics' revamped label for releasing film scores and soundtracks, under the name Mercury Classics Soundtrack & Score. It was for a digitally released on 23 December 2022, coinciding the film's limited theatrical release, followed by a physical CD and vinyl edition release by Target Corporation later that month. The score cue "Speak Up," which served as the basis for the film's trailer music, was released digitally on 4 November. The score received critical acclaim, praising Hildur's composition.

== Background ==
"Women Talking tells a story inspired by true events. While the story is both doomsday and a call to prayer, the music needed to be a vehicle for hope – a way forward from a situation that is unbearably dark. It was a very interesting process for me to go through because I inevitably had to put it in context with the big forward and backwards movements that women have been experiencing. Instead of allowing myself to be paralysed with anger, I felt the way forward was to lean into friendship and connection, as we experience in the film."

— Hildur Guðnadóttir

Hildur was announced as the film's composer in January 2022, who found the subject of the film to be "horrifying and disturbing". During her research, she felt that sexual assault incidents against women, were relevant in the current times, since the film is set before the MeToo movement (which happened in late-2017). But also felt the story is about a community, and how the women come together and move forward those incident. She opined that Polley wanted to "emphasize the beauty of that unity, and because of the nature of the event". She discussed with Polley about the scoring process, as "the role of the music had to be to bring a sense of hope and forward movement to the story".

She collaborated with musician Skúli Sverrisson who played acoustic guitar for the score, where she would interact about the feelings of each women they face, and recording the score. She ended up "bringing into that music was that love of their friendship". He called it as the "most optimistic and hopeful score" she had done for, the most horrific subjects she had come across, and praised Polley's vision for the film, which was "beautiful in that sense" appreciating her contribution.

== Track listing ==
Women Talking (Original Motion Picture Soundtrack)
No.	Title	Length
1.	"Work of Ghosts"	0:24
2.	"Speak Up"	3:16
3.	"Doomsday"	0:54
4.	"Not All Men"	3:29
5.	"Pros and Cons"	1:20
6.	"Always"	2:43
7.	"I Saw Him"	0:20
8.	"He's Here"	3:30
9.	"Teeth"	0:22
10.	"Peace of God"	2:17
11.	"Jumping"	1:30
12.	"Boys"	2:26
13.	"Nettie"	0:21
14.	"Leaving"	3:41
Total length:		26:33

== Critical response ==
Even before its official release, the score received positive critical acclaim from critics. Manuel São Bento of FirstShowing.net wrote "when the entertainment levels threaten to diminish, Hildur Guðnadóttir's lovely score comes in. Beautiful strings create a pleasant melody, generating an atmospheric environment that passionately accompanies the narrative that is unfolding." Ricky Valero mentioned Hildur's score "is equally parts brilliant as it is haunting". Writing for WhyNow, Maria Lattila mentioned "Hildur Guðnadóttir, who also composed the score for Joker, has created a score that never over-powers Polley’s script but accompanies it and in key moments, amplifies it." Collider's Ross Bonaime had called Hildur's "restrained yet powerful score highlights the impact of what these women are doing, and the new step forward this experience represents for them all." Jericho Tadeo of MovieWeb wrote "Hildur Guðnadóttir's music underscores Women Talking's notions of hope and possibility, which helps elevate the story and empower the women exercising, possibly for the first time in their lives, choice."

Sheri Linden of The Hollywood Reporter wrote "Throughout the film, the score by Hildur Guðnadóttir is a deft blend of tradition and a sense of yearning, while the inclusion of the Monkees' "Daydream Believer" enriches a sequence involving a census taker that’s a beautiful pop of the surreal." Praising the music, Peter Howell of Toronto Star also noted the "communal singing of “Nearer My God to Thee” is more the norm". Flickering Myth critic Chris Connor wrote "Oscar-winner Hildur Guðnadóttir's score is at times reminiscent of her sterling string led work on Joker but goes beyond this to hauntingly capture the women’s plight, evolving as it progresses incorporating guitars as well showing the shift in the women’s mindsets as their discussions shift."

== Industry response ==
Women Talking's critical acclaim from critics as the film festival premiere screenings, increased the possibilities of nominations at major ceremonies, including Hildur's score. The film was Hildur's only chance at a nomination for the Best Original Score category at the 95th Academy Awards until her score for another film, Tár, starring Cate Blanchett, was also considered eligible for the category due to the new criteria rules which were implemented last year. Gold Derby mentioned it as one of "the strong contenders" eligible for the category, though neither film earned an Oscar nomination. Variety also reported that Women Talking's score was predicted to be nominated for the 80th Golden Globe Awards at the Best Original Score, which it eventually was.

== Awards and nominations ==
At the 2022 Toronto International Film Festival, where the film was screened, its composer Hildur Guðnadóttir received a tribute award for her contributions to film music.

Award	Date of ceremony	Category	Recipient(s)	Result	Ref.
Hollywood Music in Media Awards	16 November 2022	Best Original Score in a Feature Film	Hildur Guðnadóttir	Nominated	
Washington D.C. Area Film Critics Association	12 December 2022	Best Original Score	Hildur Guðnadóttir	Nominated	
St. Louis Gateway Film Critics Association	18 December 2022	Best Score	Hildur Guðnadóttir	Won	
Golden Globe Awards	10 January 2023	Best Original Score	Hildur Guðnadóttir	Nominated	
Critics' Choice Movie Awards	15 January 2023	Best Score	Hildur Guðnadóttir	Nominated	
Satellite Awards	11 February 2023	Best Original Score	Hildur Guðnadóttir	Nominated	
Hollywood Critics Association Creative Arts Awards	17 February 2023	Best Score	Hildur Guðnadóttir	Nominated	

== Release history ==
Release dates and formats for Women Talking (Original Motion Picture Soundtrack)
Region	Date	Format(s)	Label	Ref.
Various	23 December 2022	Digital download; streaming	Mercury Classics	
Various	December 2022	CD; vinyl (Target exclusive)	Mercury Classics	
