= Ex Machina (soundtrack) =

Ex Machina (Original Motion Picture Soundtrack)

Film score by Ben Salisbury and Geoff Barrow
- Released: 6 April 2015
- Recorded: 2014–2015
- Venues: Bristol, England
- Studios: Invada Studios; Victoria Rooms
- Genre: Film score
- Length: 49:38
- Labels: Invada; Back Lot Music
- Producers: Ben Salisbury; Geoff Barrow

Ben Salisbury and Geoff Barrow chronology
Ex Machina (2015)	Free Fire (2016)

Ex Machina (Original Motion Picture Soundtrack) is the score album to the 2015 film of the same name. Composed and produced by Ben Salisbury and Geoff Barrow of Portishead, the film marked their first feature film scoring stint, after the soundtrack for the initial temp score to the 2012 film Dredd, was not accepted by the directors, and then released into a standalone album titled Drokk. Garland then roped the duo for Ex Machina.

The scoring process lasted for ten months, in which Salisbury and Barrow wanted a "human approach to the android robot Ava" using organic and real sounds. The instrumentation consisted of mostly real instruments and not considered orchestral or synth-heavy music. These organic instruments were blended into the electronic ones, producing a "minimalist, highly tense mix of beauty and discomfort".

The album consisted of 10 score cues, released digitally by Back Lot Music on 6 April 2015. Barrow's in-house label Invada Records later released the album on CD on 6 May, and issued multiple vinyl editions set for release by that June. An expanded edition, containing 10 more additional score cues were released later. The album received positive response, praising the instrumental approach and compositions.

== Background ==
The film marked the first of a collaboration with Ben Salisbury and Portishead instrumentalist Geoff Barrow. Initially, Salisbury and Barrow had previously scored for Drokk, an initial album for the 2012 film Dredd, where Alex Garland served as one of the writers for the film, directed by Pete Travis. Garland roped the duo for Ex Machina as he liked the score for Drokk, with Salisbury and Barrow had discussed on the influence of artificial intelligence crediting films such as Blade Runner (1982) and Star Wars franchise films, and mentioned that he came across stories about artificial intelligence while working for Ex Machina.

On discussing the similarities of Ex Machina and Her (2013), which are important in "making artificial intelligence a topic that is discussed from a thought-provoking angle", Salisbury opined that "Sci-fi has always had that interesting component. It provokes questions and takes subject matter that is normally beyond the realm of normal conversation and brings it to the masses." Salisbury and Barrow did not take inspiration from popular musicians, as Garland was not keen on referencing their works. For Drokk, works from John Carpenter, Clint Mansell and the electronic group Tangerine Dream were referenced into the album. Some critics noted similar references of Ex Machina score, to that of Under the Skin which was composed by Mica Levi, and was critically acclaimed.

== Development and production ==
After seeing the film's rough cut, Garland wanted a simple, but "hopefully enchanting and beautiful theme" for Ava, the humanoid robot, though it has a horror element infused in it. The musical personality of Ava, is similar to the music box or an automation which represents the "growing mood for Ava". But the other characters do not have their motif, as "they are not character related". On discussing the human nature of Ava, depicted through its music, Salisbury had stated:

"Alex knew the film would fail if the audience didn't have empathy for Ava as a human being. You need to believe that someone can fall in love with her. Me and Geoff have an inclination to write stuff with a melancholic edge to it, and that worked but for this one time when Alex wanted something with no edge at all - just for this one bit where you first see Ava and she is dressing. He wanted something completely naive and fairytale-like. That was a challenge, because sometimes it's harder to do pure unadulterated loveliness."

From the beginning, Salisbury and Barrow deviated from using an orchestral and synth score, which they attempted in Drokk, although elements of synth music had been implemented. The former wanted the score to be a mixture of organic, human and electronic sounds, that need a "simplistic, naive and almost fairytale quality, to help the character and the audience to fall in love with Ava". Hence, the use of real instruments such as guitars, celeste, optical-disc keyboard and organs that are more organic than synths. The music created from real instruments, were slowed down alongside warped brass stuff, and slowed horns to implement the "human world" music. He also used the PaulStretch software to produce more slowed reverb and ambient themes.

Barrow, despite being a percussionist and drums player, did not use drums, as their attempt on using the instrument, ended up sounding wrong. He said, "There's an old organ that I’ve got and because some of the shots were quite long, and left lingering, we used a pedal that's got an extremely long reverb on it, so we played this organ through it and we played synths through it. We just wanted to have this feeling of a slow pace, with nothing really sharp, and I think drums are quite sharp." Other music producers included Anthony Tombling Jr. from the Dragons band, known under the alias name Cuts, and Chris Tombling, producing and engineering the themes. The former composed the track "Bunsen Burner", while the latter produced "The Test Worked" along with the composers.

== Composition ==
Salisbury had opined that in a film with minimal dialogues, bringing the right nuance was the most challenging, as the big music scenes were not difficult. He added "There are three or four scenes in the film where the music really steps out to the front, which you might think were the hardest to write music for because the music is all on its own and plays such an important role, but, actually, all of those scenes were done in like two days’ writing. The hard things are getting the tiny moments right so you don't lead people down the wrong path."

Another difficulty, he experienced while composing is such as the instrumentation does not work outside those parameters, and they set up those instruments, to avoid those specific noises, though viewers want specific sounds from the score. Barrow explained that:

"A lot of commercial writers, and noncommercial writers, are quite prepared just to throw in anything to make it work. We made an effort not to go outside of our dogma, our sound palette… If you listen to a lot of scores, all of a sudden a piano note will go “bling bling bling.” It's never been in the start of the film and it's just arrived for this one scene, and it never appears again. I believe in sonic unconscious—if you add something in, it just makes people go, 'What was that about?'"

== Album artwork ==
The artwork was designed by Marc Bessant, featured two album covers. The first album cover for the Back Lot Music release featured the rear view of Ava lying down, surrounded by a black background. The second album cover for the CD and vinyl issues by Invada Records, featured a still of Ava examining the masked face of her clone.

== Release and marketing ==
Salisbury and Barrow announced the soundtrack officially on 5 February 2015, and an edited version of the cue "Hacking / Cutting" from the score album was released on their SoundCloud channel. The album was released digitally by Back Lot Music (the in-house studio label of Universal Pictures) on 6 April, four days before the film's theatrical release in United States. Prior to the official release, the album was previewed in iTunes on 3 April.

Barrow's label Invada Records, released the physical versions of the album, beginning with a CD release on 6 May, and vinyl editions set for release on 5 June. The vinyl release featured multiple colored variants, with different catalog codes and packaging, for distribution in physical stores. Re-issued vinyl editions, were published and released on 3 June 2016 and 9 June 2017.

== Track listing ==
Original score
No.	Title	Length
1.	"The Turing Test"	4:30
2.	"Watching"	5:16
3.	"Ava"	2:19
4.	"Falling"	5:33
5.	"I Am Become Death"	3:15
6.	"Hacking / Cutting"	6:36
7.	"The Test Worked"	8:59
8.	"Skin"	5:24
9.	"Out"	2:02
10.	"Bunsen Burner (The Cuts)"	4:00
Total length:		47:54

Bonus tracks
No.	Title	Length
11.	"The Lab"	1:41
12.	"Masks"	2:29
13.	"Ava Undresses (Demo Version 1)"	2:12
14.	"Session 2"	0:35
15.	"Mary Experiment"	2:58
16.	"Ava Turns To CCTV"	1:48
17.	"Climbing The Waterfall"	1:48
18.	"Ava Undresses (Demo Version 2)"	1:34
19.	"Reversing The Test"	2:04
20.	"A Beginning"	3:07
Total length:		68:13

== Additional music ==
The Oliver Cheatham single "Get Down Saturday Night" sound tracked the disco dancing sequence by Ava, which was chosen by Garland while shooting the film. Salisbury mentioned that two Savages tracks were planned to be used, until one of their tracks were included. "Husbands" played during the opening of the film, which Barrow mentioned "it sounded and looked totally, totally brilliant and it was a really great opening, but it set you up for a different film – it set you up for almost what felt like a Marvel film, a really brilliant, exciting Marvel film, and then you were just going to go into an hour of dialogue."

Other tracks included: "Enola Gay" by Orchestral Manoeuvres in the Dark, "Piano Sonata No 21 D. 960 in B-flat Major" (first movement) composed by Franz Schubert and performed by Alfred Brendel and "Unaccompanied Cello Suite No 1 in G Major BWV 1007 – Prelude", composed by J.S. Bach, performed by Yo-Yo Ma. The theme song from the film Ghostbusters is listed in the end titles with the credit, "words and music by Ray Erskine Publishing Limited", although only its refrain is spoken by the character Nathan.

== Reception ==
Heather Phares of AllMusic wrote "Subtle and haunting, Ex Machina is another fine example of the quality film music Invada released in the 2010s." Music critic Adrian Barr had mentioned "Throughout it's a minimal soundscape but there are also a few fuller tracks that encompass guitars and percussion which work perfectly within the flow of the album. The film has already achieved high praise and it goes without saying Geoff Barrow and Ben Salisbury will not go unnoted on this achievement." Daniel Schweiger of AssignmentX wrote "Barrow and Salisbury's Ex-Machina completely sucks the adventurous listener in to its high tech, and at times alarming, seduction." Film Music Central wrote "Very often the simplest film score is one of the best, and this is true in Ex Machina."

Simon Tucker of Louder Than War had mentioned "This score is a perfect example of something that enhances the film but is also just as effective if you have not yet managed to see it. These are not 30 second – one minute long cues that flit past you at a rapid pace, this is an album in the purest sense. Tracks are allowed to develop and a narrative is created. Storytelling of the highest order. In a time when people are already announcing that the album of the year has been released, Ex-Machina will most certainly be up there when the votes are counted." Andres Rodriguez of MXDWN mentioned "Ex Machina is unforgiving; even after an ephemeral ambush of thick, throbbing synths and chilling scrapes simmers down to a quiet glow, the thrill of its return is ominously felt."

Minnah Zaheer of Afterglow wrote "The score of “Ex Machina” functions as a key device in contributing to the deceit of the audience while also foreshadowing the final decisions and true personalities of the film's characters. By attempting to paint Nathan as the clear villain and Ava as the clear damsel in distress, the score is much more effectively able to shock the audience when the film's events unfurl and reveal Ava's clever deception."

== Chart performance ==
Chart (2015)	Peak position
UK Soundtrack Albums (OCC)	21

== Accolades ==
Award / Association / Film festival	Date of ceremony	Category	Recipient(s)	Result	Ref.
ASCAP Film and Television Music Awards	24 March 2016	Best Film Score	Ben Salisbury and Geoff Barrow	Nominated	
Ivor Novello Awards	19 May 2016	Best Original Film Score	Ben Salisbury and Geoff Barrow	Won	
World Soundtrack Awards	24 October 2015	Discovery of the Year	Ben Salisbury and Geoff Barrow	Nominated	
World Soundtrack Awards	24 October 2015	Public Choice Award	Ben Salisbury and Geoff Barrow	Nominated	

== Credits ==
Credits adapted from CD liner notes.

- Music composer, producer – Ben Salisbury, Geoff Barrow
- Additional producers – Anthony Tombling Jr., Chris Tombling
- Glockenspiel, Vibraphone – Joby Burgess
- Celeste – Jonathan Scott
- Guitar – Jerry Crozier-Cole
- Engineers – Steve Bruce, Stuart Matthews, Jonathan Scott, Laurence Anslow
- Music editor – Yann McCullough, Simon Ashdown, Tim Evans
- Mixing – Rupert Coulson
- Mastering – Shawn Joseph
- Product manager (marketing for Back Lot Music) – Nikki Walsh
- Production manager (director for Back Lot Music) – Jake Voulgarides
- Executive producer for Back Lot Music – Mike Knobloch
- Graphic design – Marc Bessant
