= One Night in Miami... (soundtrack) =

Soundtrack album to the 2020 film

One Night in Miami... (Original Motion Picture Soundtrack) is the soundtrack album to the 2020 film One Night in Miami... directed by Regina King. The album featured 22 songs, which are popular 1960s singles from artists including Sam Cooke, Ray Charlies, Jackie Wilson and several others, and performed some by the film's cast. It also features an original song "Speak Now" by Leslie Odom Jr. and Sam Ashworth, and few cues from the score composed by Terence Blanchard.

The album was released by ABKCO Records digitally on December 25, 2020 and followed by a physical CD release on January 15, and a vinyl edition released on March 5. Blanchard's score was released into a separate album, titled One Night in Miami... (Original Score) on January 15. Four of Odom Jr.'s songs, including "Speak Now" were released into a soundtrack EP titled Speak Now (Selections From One Night In Miami... Soundtrack) on May 7, 2021. The song "Speak Now" received nominations in the "Original Song" category at the Academy Awards, Golden Globe Awards and Grammy Awards, and won Critics' Choice Movie Award for Best Song.

== Background ==
Terence Blanchard composed the musical score and also co-produced few of the songs. Blanchard had said it as a "brilliant experience" on working with Regina King, as she had a "really strong directing talent". When they began working together on the score, Blanchard suggested King on trying few approaches to score for the film. He initially intended an orchestral music with a large ensemble, but King wanted to use a piano-based score, as it "creates a historical narration for the film".

Blanchard called it as "an interesting exercise for me, because then everything about the piano became bigger, like the dynamics, the touch, the attack, the range. All of those things became extremely important and having variables to help tell the story." Since the musical style is a jazz-based, he roped in popular jazz pianist Benny Green to "improvise and manipulate the melodic content for that theme". For the prayer scene with Malcolm X, he used the duduk for that particular cue.

As the filming was completed during the COVID-19 pandemic lockdown, scoring for the film began later that month and completed in early December 2020. Blanchard recorded the score at his home studio during the pandemic, and since he used limited instruments for the film, he felt the recording was easier and need not use the orchestral section where he had to record each orchestra separately due to restrictions. The film's editor Tariq Anwar, had used temp music while editing the film, to help in the picture cutting. He thought of using the solo piano for the transitions, and had downloaded several samples and played with jazz, blues and gospel, assigning different styles to the four Black icons to capture their personalities. However, Anwar had said that "Fortunately, Regina liked the idea but she didn't like the style of piano. She was keen on an Aretha Franklin's influence. She then used that to implement that in Terence Blanchard's score."

== Releases ==
=== One Night in Miami... (Original Motion Picture Soundtrack) ===
One Night in Miami... (Original Motion Picture Soundtrack)

Soundtrack album by Various artists
- Released: December 25, 2020
- Genre: Film soundtrack
- Length: 43:56
- Label: ABKCO
- Producer: Nicholai Baxter

Singles from One Night in Miami... (Original Motion Picture Soundtrack)
- 1. "Chain Gang" Released: December 4, 2020; 2. "Speak Now" Released: December 11, 2020

On December 11, 2020, ABKCO Records officially announced the soundtrack for the film featuring 22 tracks. Sam Cooke's songs — “You Send Me,” “Chain Gang,” “Good Times”, “A Change Is Gonna Come” and "Put Me Down Easy" (Hampton House version) — were performed by Leslie Odom Jr., who portrayed Cooke, and Jay Livingston and Ray Evans' song "Tammy". In addition, an original song "Speak Now" was also performed by Odom Jr., who co-wrote the song with Sam Ashworth, who wrote for the former's 2019 album Mr.

Odom Jr. on writing the song "Speak Now" commented that "the producers were always very interested in whomever was cast as Sam [being] the person that would write the song for the movie. That they would take that experience of Sam and then [write a song]." He then collaborated with four different songwriters to write four songs, after which King chose the track "Speak Now". He further explained on the song, saying:

"The song feels a little bit like a ghost story or like a gathering around in the woods, because three of these men at least are speaking to us from beyond the grave. They're speaking to us from someplace else, and I just imagined the things that they might say and what they might ask of us right now. “Speak Now” resonated because it sounded like: Listen, your time is precious and you're not guaranteed a lot of it, so speak right now in this moment. Use your life, use everything that you are given, to make a change and to make a difference right in this moment."

Jeremy Pope who played Jackie Wilson also performed Wilson's "Lonely Teardrops". The One Night in Miami band also performed two of the tracks, which included Ray Charles' single "I Believe to My Soul". The Hollywood Symphony Orchestra contributed to the instrumental portions of the songs.

The album was officially released on December 25, 2020 in digital formats, in CD on January 15 and in vinyl on March 5. Prior to the release, the song "Chain Gang" was released as a single on December 4, 2020, on the date of the album's pre-order, and "Speak Now" was released on December 11.

One Night in Miami... (Original Motion Picture Soundtrack)
No.	Title	Writer(s)	Artist(s)	Length
1.	"Rumble, Young Man, Rumble!"	Terence Blanchard	Terence Blanchard	02:06
2.	"Sam Cooke Comes to Stage / Copacabana Introduction"	Ruy Folguera	One Night In Miami band	00:24
3.	"Tammy"	Jay Livingston; Ray Evans	Leslie Odom Jr.	01:47
4.	"Howl For Me Daddy"	Kevin Moore; Tarriona Ball; Terence Blanchard	Keb' Mo'; Tarriona "Tank" Ball; Terence Blanchard	02:25
5.	"Do Us All Proud"	Terence Blanchard	Terence Blanchard	00:44
6.	"I Believe To My Soul"	Ray Charles	One Night In Miami band	01:53
7.	"Salah Time"	Terence Blanchard	Terence Blanchard	01:53
8.	"I'm King Of The World!"	Terence Blanchard	Terence Blanchard	01:15
9.	"Put Me Down Easy" (Hampton House)	Sam Cooke	Leslie Odom Jr.	00:49
10.	"Put Me Down Easy"	Sam Cooke	L.C. Cooke	02:31
11.	"Greazee"	Billy Preston; Fred Smith; J.W. Alexander	Billy Preston	04:20
12.	"Ain't Yo Stuff Safe Here"	Terence Blanchard	Terence Blanchard	02:07
13.	"Malcolm Looks Out The Window"	Terence Blanchard	Terence Blanchard	00:53
14.	"You Send Me"	Sam Cooke	Leslie Odom Jr.	02:49
15.	"(I Love You) For Sentimental Reasons"	Deek Watson; William Best	Leslie Odom Jr.	02:38
16.	"Brother, What Is Going On?"	Terence Blanchard	Terence Blanchard	00:59
17.	"I Wanna Damn Party"	Terence Blanchard	Terence Blanchard	00:34
18.	"Lonely Teardrops"	Berry Gordy; Gwendolyn Gordy Fuqua; Billy Davis	Jeremy Pope	02:21
19.	"Chain Gang"	Sam Cooke	Leslie Odom Jr.	02:11
20.	"Good Times"	Sam Cooke	Leslie Odom Jr.	02:30
21.	"A Change Is Gonna Come"	Sam Cooke	Leslie Odom Jr.	03:01
22.	"Speak Now"	Leslie Odom Jr.; Sam Ashworth	Leslie Odom Jr.	03:06
Total length:				43:56

=== One Night in Miami... (Original Score) ===
One Night in Miami... (Original Score)

Film score by Terence Blanchard
- Released: January 15, 2021
- Recorded: 2020
- Genre: Film score
- Length: 13:07
- Label: ABKCO
- Producer: Terence Blanchard

Terence Blanchard chronology
Perry Mason (2020)	One Night in Miami... (2021)	Father of the Bride (2022)

The soundtrack featured eight instrumental compositions from Blanchard's score, including "Howl For Me Daddy" performed by Keb' Mo', Tarriona "Tank" Ball and Blanchard. Those tracks were released into a separate score album on January 15.

One Night in Miami... (Original Score)
No.	Title	Artist(s)	Length
1.	"Rumble, Young Man, Rumble!"	Terence Blanchard	02:06
2.	"Do Us All Proud"	Terence Blanchard	00:44
3.	"Salah Time"	Terence Blanchard	01:53
4.	"I'm King Of The World!"	Terence Blanchard	01:15
5.	"Ain't Yo Stuff Safe Here"	Terence Blanchard	02:07
6.	"Malcolm Looks Out The Window"	Terence Blanchard	00:53
7.	"Brother, What Is Going On?"	Terence Blanchard	00:59
8.	"I Wanna Damn Party"	Terence Blanchard	00:34
9.	"Howl For Me Daddy"	Keb' Mo'; Tarriona "Tank" Ball; Terence Blanchard	02:25

=== Speak Now (Selections From One Night In Miami... Soundtrack) ===
Speak Now (Selections From One Night In Miami... Soundtrack)

EP by Leslie Odom Jr.
- Released: May 7, 2021
- Genre: Extended play
- Length: 11:22
- Label: ABKCO
- Producers: Nicholai Baxter; Leslie Odom Jr.

Speak Now (Selections From One Night In Miami... Soundtrack) is the soundtrack extended play, featured four songs from the soundtrack performed by Leslie Odom Jr. It was released on May 7, 2021.

Speak Now (Selections From One Night In Miami... Soundtrack)
No.	Title	Writer(s)	Artist(s)	Length
1.	"Chain Gang"	Sam Cooke	Leslie Odom Jr.	02:11
2.	"Good Times"	Sam Cooke	Leslie Odom Jr.	02:30
3.	"A Change Is Gonna Come"	Sam Cooke	Leslie Odom Jr.	03:01
4.	"Speak Now"	Leslie Odom Jr.; Sam Ashworth	Leslie Odom Jr.	03:06
Total length:				11:22

== Reception ==
The Hollywood Reporter's David Rooney complimented the score as "cool" and "jazzy". Richard Roeper of Chicago Sun-Times felt that the score "beautifully augments the history-in-the-making gathering of these four icons at a pivotal moment in their lives". Michael Philips of Chicago Tribune wrote "Terence Blanchard's score goes for solo jazz piano lines, nimble and expressive. This isn't a full-orchestra kind of affair; it's a jazz quartet of a play, and a movie." Alex Ramon of British Film Institute called the score as "insistently jaunty".

== Accolades ==
The Academy of Motion Picture Arts and Sciences disqualified Blanchard's score from the longlist of Best Original Score for the 93rd Academy Awards as it failed to meet the eligibility criteria of having 60% original music composed specifically for the film. The film accompanied several existing cues from several artists, such as Sam Cooke (whom the film is based on) and lesser number of cues. It also failed to be longlisted for BAFTA Award for Best Original Music at the 70th British Academy Film Awards who specified 50% original music as the eligibility criteria.

Award	Date of ceremony	Category	Recipient(s)	Result	Ref.
Academy Awards	April 25, 2021	Best Original Song	"Speak Now" — Leslie Odom Jr. and Sam Ashworth	Nominated	
Critics' Choice Movie Awards	March 7, 2021	Best Song	"Speak Now" — Leslie Odom Jr. and Sam Ashworth	Won	
Golden Globe Awards	February 28, 2021	Best Original Song	"Speak Now" — Leslie Odom Jr. and Sam Ashworth	Nominated	
Grammy Awards	April 3, 2022	Best Compilation Soundtrack for Visual Media	One Night in Miami... (Original Motion Picture Soundtrack)	Nominated	
Grammy Awards	April 3, 2022	Best Song Written for Visual Media	"Speak Now" — Leslie Odom Jr. and Sam Ashworth	Nominated	
Hollywood Music in Media Awards	January 27, 2021	Best Original Song in a Feature Film	"Speak Now" — Leslie Odom Jr. and Sam Ashworth	Nominated	
Houston Film Critics Society Awards	January 18, 2021	Best Original Song	"Speak Now" — Leslie Odom Jr. and Sam Ashworth	Won	
San Francisco Bay Area Film Critics Circle Awards	January 18, 2021	Best Original Score	Terence Blanchard	Nominated	
