= List of festivals in Pennsylvania =

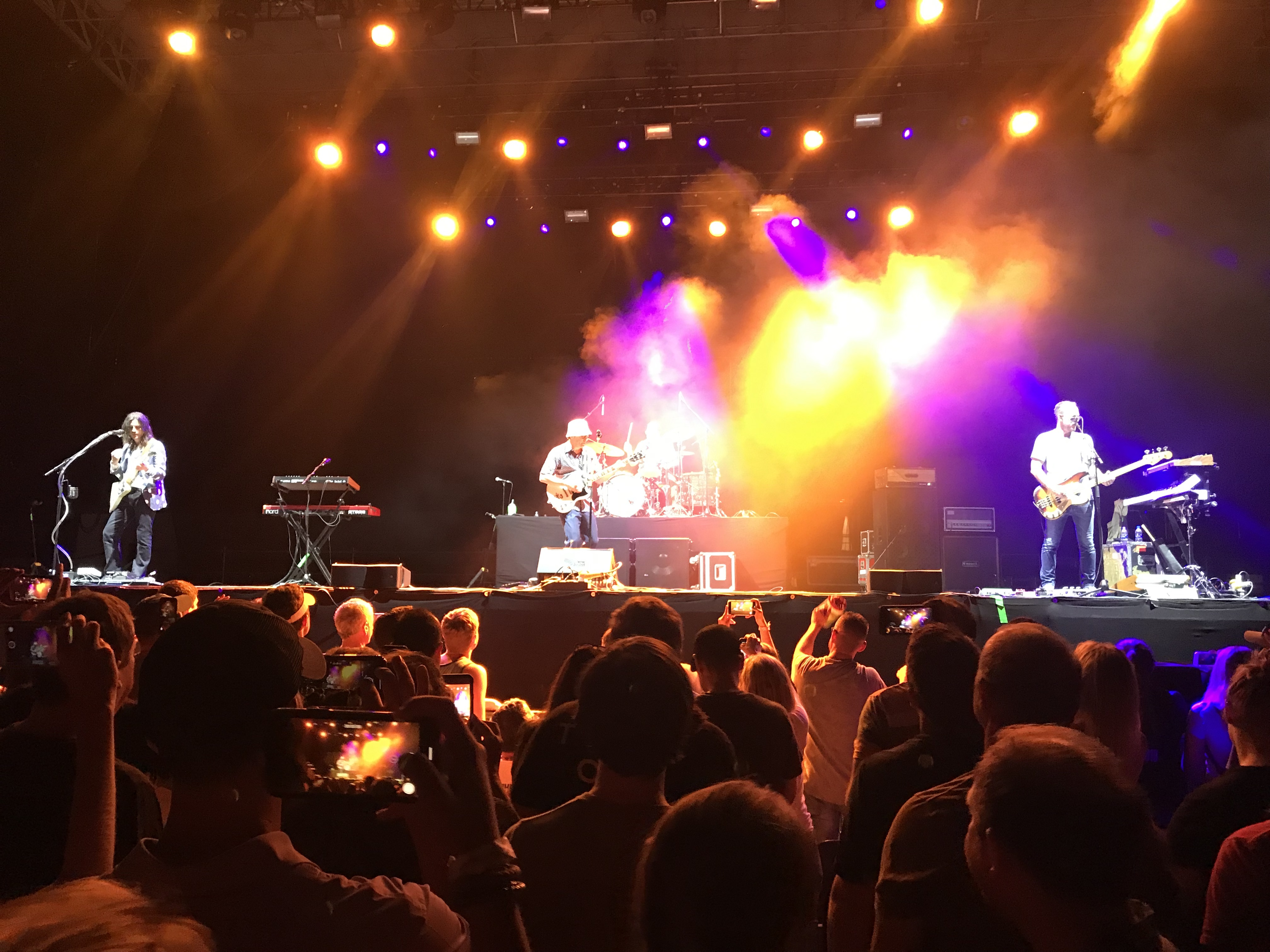
Musikfest, an eleven-day outdoor music festival held annually each August in Bethlehem, Pennsylvania, is the largest free music festival in the United States, drawing over 1.3 million attendees.

This is a partial list of festivals and celebrations in Pennsylvania.

== March ==
- Pennsylvania Maple Festival - Meyersdale

== May ==
- Bridgefest - Oil City
- Fairie Festival at Spyglass Ridge Winery - Sunbury
- Fine Arts Fiesta - third week in May in Wilkes-Barre
- Mayfair Festival of the Arts - Allentown
- Peddler's Village Strawberry Festival - first weekend in May in Lahaska
- Phoenixville Beer & Wine Festival - the Saturday of Mother's Day weekend - in Phoenixville
- Silk Screen Asian American Film Festival - Pittsburgh

== June ==
- Artifest at the Museum of Indian Culture - Allentown
- A Taste of Egypt - Carlisle
- Moravian Historical Society Arts & Crafts Festival - Nazareth
- SouthSide Film Festival - Bethlehem
- Three Rivers Arts Festival - Pittsburgh
- Thunder in the Valley motorcycle rally - Johnstown

== July ==
- American MusicFest - Harrisburg
- Central Pennsylvania Festival of the Arts - State College
- Kutztown Folk Festival - Kutztown
- Pennsic War - Slippery Rock
- Philadelphia International Gay & Lesbian Film Festival - Philadelphia
- Roar on the Shore - Erie
- Rootz: The Green City Music Festival - Pittsburgh

== August ==
- Fresh Fest Beer Fest - Pittsburgh
- Great Allentown Fair - Allentown
- Harford Fair - Harford Township
- Lithuanian Days - [Schuylkill County]
- Musikfest - Bethlehem
- OilFest- Titusville
- Philadelphia Folk Festival - Schwenksville
- Roasting Ears of Corn Festival - Native American heritage festival in Allentown
- The Corn Festival] - Shippensburg
- The Peach Music Festival - Scranton
- Thunder Mountain Lenapé Nation - Saltsburg
- Celebrate Erie - Erie

== September ==
- Bloomsburg Fair - Bloomsburg
- Budweiser Made in America Festival - Philadelphia
- Ephrata Fair - Ephrata
- Great Allentown Fair - Allentown
- Little Italy Days - Bloomfield
- Lyons Fiddle Festival - Lyons
- Mushroom Festival - Kennett Square
- Pittsburgh Dragon Boat Festival - Pittsburgh (South Side)
- Scottdale Fall Festival - Scottdale

== October ==
- Applefest - first weekend in October in Franklin
- New Holland Farmer's Fair - New Holland
- Paoli Blues Fest - first Saturday in October in Paoli
- Philadelphia Asian American Film Festival - Philadelphia
- Philadelphia Film Festival - Philadelphia
- Pottstown Brew Fest - Pottstown
