= Andrey Sokolov (actor) =

Russian actor

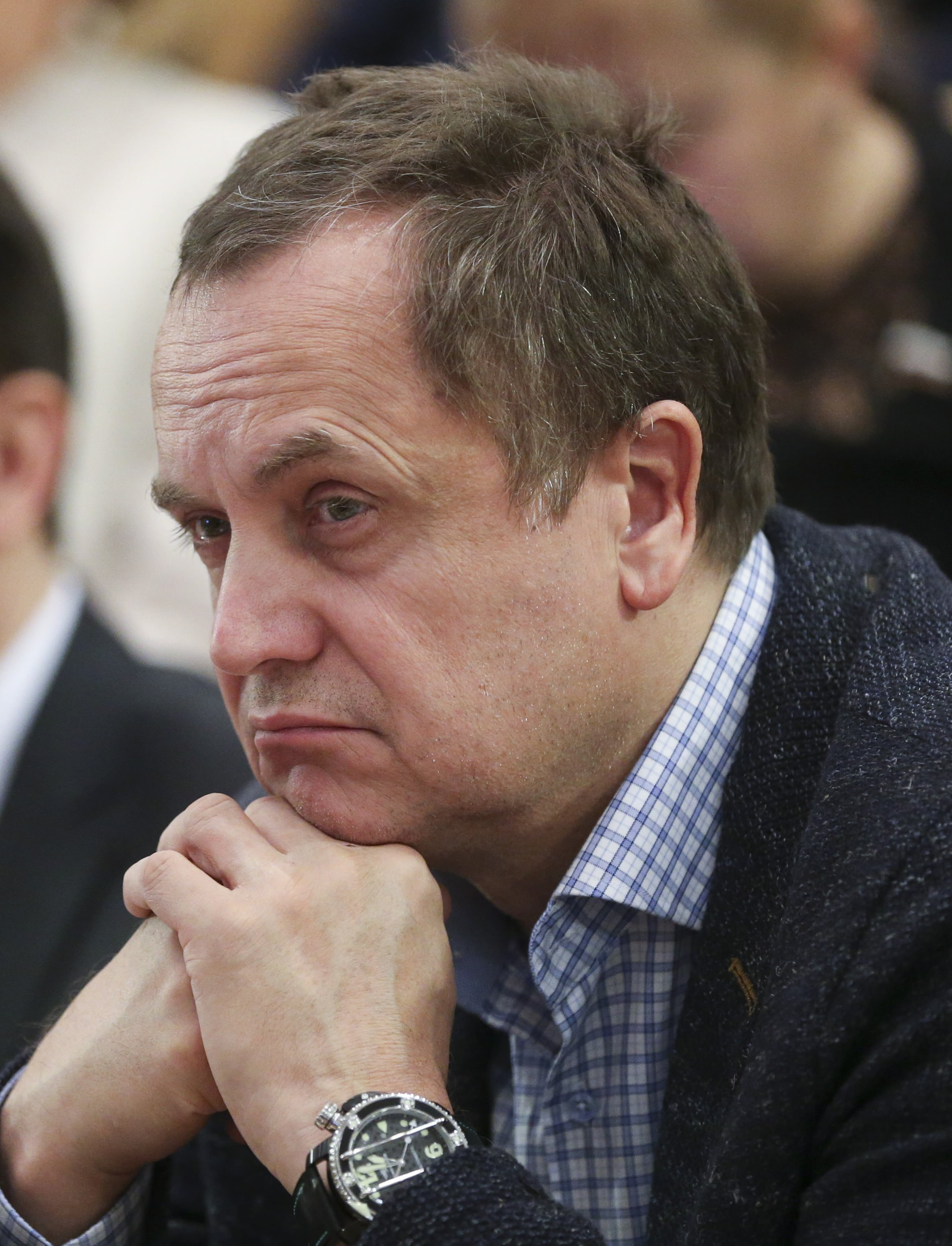
- Born: Andrey Alekseevich Sokolov; 13 August 1962 (age 63); Moscow, RSFSR, USSR
- Occupations: actor, TV host
- Years active: 1987–present
- Children: Sofia Sokolova (born August 2010)

Andrey Alekseevich Sokolov (Russian: Андре́й Алексе́евич Соколо́в; born 13 August 1962, Moscow) is a Soviet and Russian actor, film and theater director, TV presenter, producer, and public figure. He was awarded People's Artist of the Russian Federation in 2005.

== Biography ==
Andrey Alexeyevich Sokolov was born on 13 August 1962, in Moscow. His father, Alexey Sergeyevich Sokolov, was a construction worker who began his career as a plumber and later became the chief engineer of PMK-24 before retirement. His mother, Lyubov Matveyevna Sokolova, was a power systems engineer. His father had another family.

At the age of 13, Sokolov began working for his father—first as an apprentice, then as a certified plumber (3rd class).

While in school, he participated in swimming, ice hockey (as a goalkeeper under coach Alexander Sidelnikov), and martial arts. He was also a ballroom dance prizewinner in Moscow.

After finishing high school on his second attempt, Sokolov enrolled in the Moscow State Aviation Technological University and graduated in 1986 as a mechanical engineer specializing in aerospace manufacturing.

In 1986, he entered the Boris Shchukin Theatre Institute, studying under Lyudmila Stavskaya, and graduated in 1990. That same year, he joined the troupe of the Lenkom Theatre, where he continues to perform. He also collaborates with the Mossovet Theatre and the Moon Theatre.

Sokolov got his first film role by chance. While waiting for an actress friend at the Gorky Film Studio in Moscow, he was noticed by director Vitaly Makarov, who offered him the role of a young doctor, Alexey Orlov, in the musical fairy tale She with a Broom, He in a Black Hat (1987).

He gained nationwide fame as a student of the theatre institute, starring in Little Vera (1988), directed by Vasily Pichul. The film was notable for breaking taboos around sex in Soviet cinema, and Sokolov became the first "sex symbol" of the Perestroika era.

Other notable roles include appearances in The Art of Living in Odessa (1989), The Executioner (1990), Tsar Ivan the Terrible (1991), Prediction (1993), and The Secret of Queen Anne, or Musketeers Thirty Years Later (1993). He has appeared in over 70 films and television series.

In 1991, Sokolov graduated from the evening department of the Moscow State Linguistic University, earning a degree in English translation.

As a writer, he authored the short story "Duel," which was adapted into an episode of Yeralash.

In 1998, he completed courses at the High Courses for Scriptwriters and Film Directors in Moscow, studying under Vladimir Menshov and Vladimir Motyl.

From 1999 to 2016, he was the artistic director of the theatre "Monologue XXI Century".

He is the president of the Russian Actors Guild film festival Sozvezdie ("Constellation"), vice president of the children's film festival Scarlet Sails, and a trustee of the charity foundation "President". He is also an academician of the Russian Academy of Cinema Arts “Nika”.

== Personal life ==
Sokolov’s first wife was Irina.

His second wife (2000–2001) was Yevgenia Anatolyevna Guseva-Legkovskaya (born 21 April 1984), a model and actress. The marriage lasted only one year.

His third wife (2010–2015) was Olga Sokolova (née Popova, born 1988), originally from Samara. They met in 2005 in Saint Petersburg, where she worked as a clothing demonstrator. They lived together before officially marrying in April 2010. In 2015, Olga left Sokolov and moved to Saint Petersburg with their daughter, Sofia. She later became a fashion designer and released her debut clothing line, "SofiAndrevna".

They have one daughter:

- Sofya Sokolova (born August 2010)

== Selected filmography ==
- 1987 — She with a Broom, He in a Black Hat as Alexey Orlov, young doctor
- 1988 — Little Vera as Sergei Sokolov
- 1989 — How Dark the Nights Are on the Black Sea as Borya
- 1990 — The Executioner as Andrey Arsentyev
- 1991 — Tsar Ivan the Terrible as Vyazemsky
- 1993 — Prediction as Oleg Goryunov in his youth
- 1993 — The Secret of Queen Anne or Musketeers Thirty Years After as Raul, Viconte de Bragelonne, son of Athos
- 2007 — I'm Staying as Gleb Shahov
- 2022 — Amanat as Emperor Nicholas I
- 2022 — The Vampires of Midland as Andrey Usachev
