= Dave Mazzoni =

American film director

- Born: October 31, 1979 (age 45); Philadelphia, Pennsylvania, U.S.
- Occupation(s): Film director, producer, screenwriter

Dave Mazzoni (born October 31, 1979) is an American film director, producer, and screenwriter.

== Early life ==
Mazzoni was born and grew up in Philadelphia. Dave Mazzoni and Tom Mattera teamed up during childhood in Philadelphia where they began their creative collaboration on film. Their first screenplay, Mectl, was selected as one of the top 250 out of 5,500 submissions in HBO’s Project Greenlight Competition in 2003.

Mazzoni graduated with a B.A. in Film and Media Arts in 2004 from Temple University. Mazzoni also studied Management Information Systems at Drexel University prior to receiving his film degree.

== Features ==
=== The 4th Dimension ===
Dave Mazzoni directed his first feature film with Tom Mattera, The 4th Dimension, in 2006. Mattera and Mazzoni made the film for just $75,000. The film won the Grand Jury Honorable Mention Award at CineVegas in 2006, the Technical Achievement Award at the Philadelphia Film Festival, and went on to screen at over 20 international film festivals. Michael Rechtshaffen of The Hollywood Reporter described the film as "stylistically channeling" the works of David Lynch and Darren Aronofsky.

=== The Fields ===
Mazzoni and Mattera directed their second independent feature, The Fields, a thriller starring Academy Award winner Cloris Leachman and Tara Reid, released in 2011. The film takes place in a small Pennsylvania town in 1973, and tells the story of a young boy and his family as they are terrorized by an unseen presence in the surrounding fields. Production spanned six weeks, throughout September and October 2009, and was shot entirely on location in the Pocono Mountains region in Kunkletown, Pennsylvania.

== Filmography ==
Film	Year	Credits	Awards
The 4th Dimension	2006	Director; Writer; Producer; Editor	Grand Jury Honorable Mention at CineVegas; Technical Achievement at the Philadelphia International Film Festival
The Fields	2011	Director; Producer; Editor	N/A
