= Mattera =

Mattera is a surname. Notable people with the surname include:

- Adam Mattera, British magazine editor
- Don Mattera (1935–2022), South African poet and writer
- Jason Mattera (born 1983), American writer, activist and magazine editor
- Tom Mattera (born 1979), American film director, producer and screenwriter
