= The 4th Dimension (film) =

- Directed by: Tom Mattera; Dave Mazzoni
- Written by: Tom Mattera; Dave Mazzoni
- Produced by: Daniel M. Kalai; Tom Mattera; Dave Mazzoni
- Starring: Louis Morabito; Miles Williams; Karen Peakes; Kate LaRoss; Suzanne Inman
- Cinematography: Daniel Watchulonis
- Music by: John Avarese
- Distributed by: TLA Entertainment Group
- Release dates: April 1, 2006 (Philadelphia International Film Festival); April 8, 2008 (United States)
- Running time: 82 minutes
- Country: United States
- Language: English

The 4th Dimension is an independent film directed by Tom Mattera and Dave Mazzoni and starring Louis Morabito, Miles Williams, Karen Peakes, Kate LaRoss, and Suzanne Inman. It premiered at the Philadelphia International Film Festival on April 1, 2006, and was released by TLA Entertainment Group on April 8, 2008.

== Awards ==
The film received the following awards:

| Year | Ceremony | Category | Result |
|---|---|---|---|
| 2006 | Philadelphia Film Festival | Festival of Independents – Technical Achievement Award Tom Mattera and Dave Mazzoni | Won |
| 2006 | CineVegas | Grand Jury Award Honorable Mention Tom Mattera and Dave Mazzoni | Won |

== Festivals ==
- Winner: Grand Jury Honorable Mention, Cinevegas
- Winner: Technical Achievement Award, Philadelphia Film Festival
- Official Selection: Montreal World Film Festival
- Official Selection: Brussels International Festival of Fantasy Film
- Official Selection: Amsterdam Fantastic Film Festival
- Official Selection: Utopiales-Nantes International Science Fiction Festival – France

== Critical reaction ==
Robert Koehler of Variety stated, "An alice-like rabbit hole of suppressed memories...simmering with neurotic emotions and surreal dream states." The film's opening images "suggest that what follows may be induced by dreams. However, co-directors Tom Mattera and Dave Mazzoni are just as concerned with establishing Jack's reality in the present (in a bric-a-brac stuffed antique shop where he fixes clocks and other contraptions) and the past (where a dazzling single-shot scene dramatizes in capsule form the boy's sad life with his ill mom).

JimmyO of Arrowinthehead.com called the film, "A visually stunning work of art".

Michael Rechtshaffen of The Hollywood Reporter stated, "Stylistically channeling David Lynch and Darren Aronofsky, The 4th Dimension is a densely etched portrait of a young man's descent into insanity", while also noting that the film "doesn't quite jell into a satisfyingly coherent whole."
