= Tommy Lee Wallace =

American film director (born 1949)

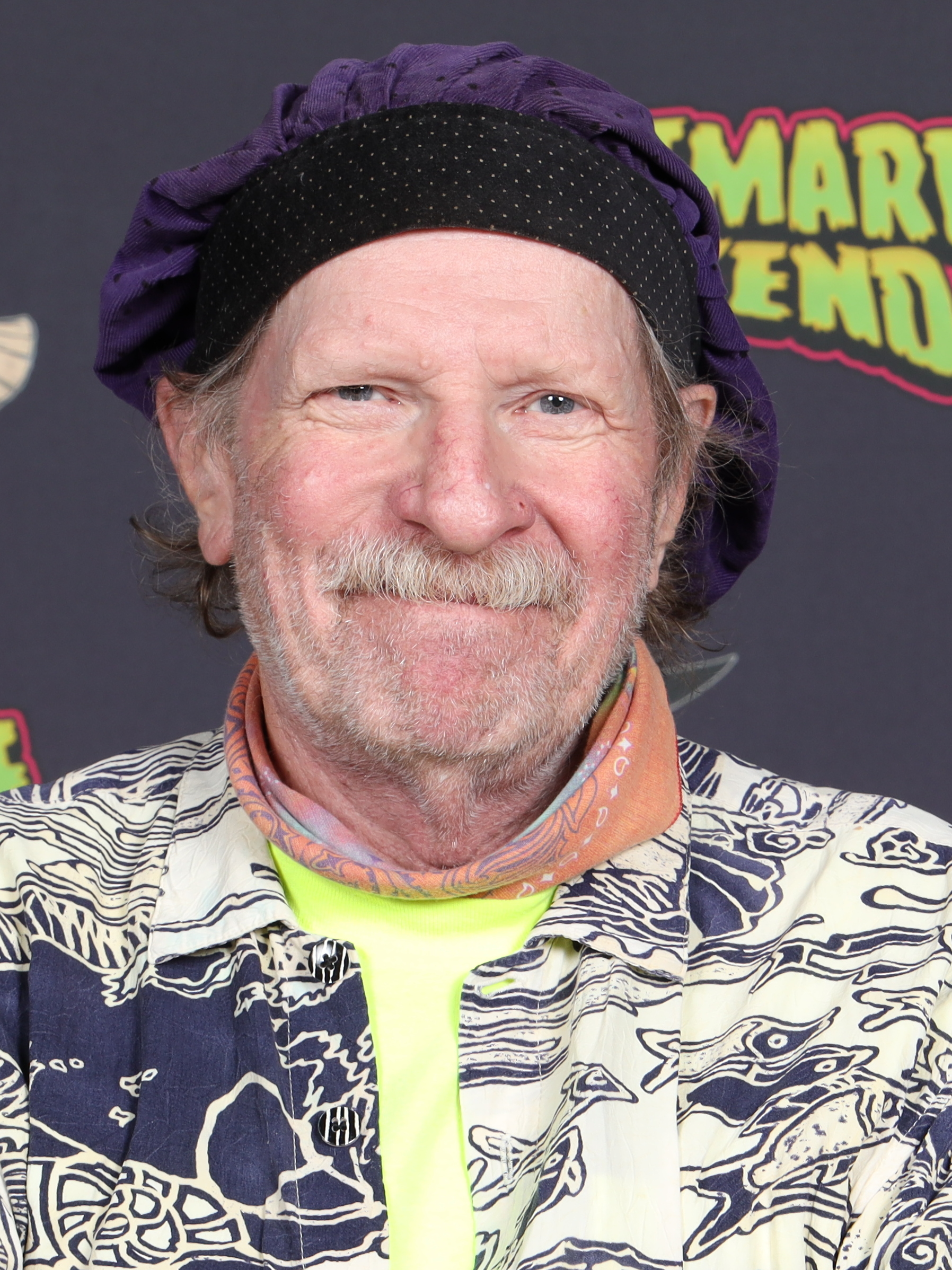
- Wallace in 2024
- Born: Thomas Lee Wallace; September 6, 1949 (age 77); Somerset, Kentucky, U.S.
- Other names: Tommy L. Wallace; Tom Wallace
- Occupations: Film director; screenwriter
- Spouse: Nancy Kyes (divorced)
- Children: 2

Thomas Lee Wallace (born September 6, 1949) is an American film director and screenwriter. He is best known for his work in the horror genre, directing films such as Halloween III: Season of the Witch (1982) and Fright Night Part 2 (1988) and also directing the 1990 television miniseries adaptation of Stephen King's epic horror novel It (1986). He is a long-time collaborator of director John Carpenter, receiving his first credit as art director on Carpenter's directorial debut Dark Star (1974). Along with Charles Bornstein, he edited both Halloween (1978) and The Fog (1980).

== Early life and education ==
Born Thomas Lee Wallace in Somerset, Kentucky to Robert G. and Kathleen Wallace, he has one older sister, Linda. He grew up in Bowling Green, Kentucky, and attended high school at Western Kentucky University teachers training school (College High).

- BFA in Design from Ohio University, Athens, Ohio
- MFA program (five semesters) in film production at University of Southern California, Los Angeles, California

== Career ==
Wallace entered the film business while attending USC film school, starting as an art director and film editor for commercials and industrial films. While in school, he began collaborating with childhood friend and fellow student John Carpenter, working on Carpenter's Dark Star (1974), a low-budget, science-fiction comedy that began as a student film. In 1976, he worked as sound effects editor and art director on Carpenter's second film, Assault on Precinct 13. He continued working with Carpenter, serving as production designer and co-editor of Halloween (1978) and The Fog (1980). In addition to his behind-the-scenes duties for these last two films, Wallace also appeared in front of the camera: intermittently as The Shape (the masked Michael Myers in the closet scene) in Halloween, and in The Fog as several different ghosts; his voice was also featured in both films as TV/radio announcers.

For Halloween II, John Carpenter (who was producing) initially offered directorial responsibilities to Wallace. After careful deliberation, Wallace declined, citing disappointment with the script (the job eventually went to Rick Rosenthal). He did, however, agree to write and direct the third film in the franchise, Halloween III: Season of the Witch, which was the first and only one to deviate from the Michael Myers storyline (Wallace's voice was also featured as the announcer and the munchkin singers in the "Silver Shamrock" commercial).

Throughout the 1980s and 1990s, Wallace continued to write and direct for television and film. Notable work includes writing the screenplay for 1982's Amityville II: The Possession; co-writing and directing 1988's Fright Night Part 2 starring Roddy McDowell; and adapting and directing the 1990 television miniseries adaptation of Stephen King's epic horror novel It.

Wallace's work in television was varied, including directing episodes of the cult TV series Max Headroom; the 1980s revival of The Twilight Zone; and Baywatch. At the height of television film popularity in the 1990s, Wallace directed several notable films, including an adaptation of the Vincent Bugliosi novel, And the Sea Will Tell (1991), The Comrades of Summer (1992), Steel Chariots (1997), and The Spree (1998).

In 1983, he co-wrote a second draft of the film adaptation of the 1980 novel The Ninja with Carpenter.

In 1986, he performed the title song of Carpenter's film Big Trouble in Little China as part of the band The Coup de Villes, alongside director John Carpenter and another director friend, Nick Castle.

== Personal life ==
Wallace is divorced from actress Nancy Kyes, with whom he has two children. He still lives in California and continues to write.

== Filmography ==
=== Film ===
Year	Title	Director	Writer
1982	Amityville II: The Possession	No	Yes
1982	Halloween III: Season of the Witch	Yes	Yes
1988	Aloha Summer	Yes	No
1988	Fright Night Part 2	Yes	Yes
1989	Far from Home	No	Yes
2002	Vampires: Los Muertos	Yes	Yes
2013	Helliversity	Yes	Yes

Acting credits

Year	Title	Role
1978	Halloween	Michael Myers (closet scene)
1980	The Fog	Ghost
1982	Halloween III: Season of the Witch	Silver Shamrock Commercial Announcer (Voice role)
1986	The Boy Who Could Fly	The Coupe de Villes
2002	Vampires: Los Muertos	Scared Guy
2011	The Fields	Hotel Bar Patron #4
2021	Pennywise: The Story of It	Himself

Other credits

Year	Title	Role
1974	Dark Star	Associate art director
1976	Assault on Precinct 13	Sound effects and art director
1978	Halloween	Editor and production designer
1980	The Fog	Editor and production designer
1986	Big Trouble in Little China	2nd unit director
2011	The Fields	Associate producer

=== Television ===
Year	Title	Director	Writer	Notes
1985–1986	The Twilight Zone	Yes	Yes	Directed episodes "Dreams for Sale" and "Little Boy Lost"; Wrote and directed episode "The Leprechaun-Artist"
1987	Max Headroom	Yes	No	2 episodes
1989	Tour of Duty	Yes	No	Episode "Nightmare"
1989	CBS Summer Playhouse	Yes	No	Episode "Outpost"
1989	A Peaceable Kingdom	Yes	No	Episode "Elephant"
1989	Baywatch	Yes	No	Episode "Cruise Ship"
1990	Stephen King's It	Yes	Yes	Miniseries
1995–1996	Flipper	Yes	No	3 episodes

TV movies

Year	Title	Director	Writer
1990	El Diablo	No	Yes
1991	And the Sea Will Tell	Yes	No
1992	The Comrades of Summer	Yes	No
1992	Danger Island	Yes	No
1994	Witness to the Execution	Yes	No
1994	Green Dolphin Beat	Yes	No
1996	Born Free: A New Adventure	Yes	No
1996	Once You Meet a Stranger	Yes	Yes
1997	Steel Chariots	Yes	No
1998	The Spree	Yes	No
1998	Final Justice	Yes	No
2004	12 Days of Terror	No	Yes

== Awards ==
Year	Result	Award	Category/Recipient(s)
1981	Nominated	Saturn Award	Best Special Effects for The Fog; Shared with: Richard Albain; James F. Liles
1991	Won	ACE Award	Writing a Movie or Miniseries for El Diablo; Shared with: John Carpenter; Bill Phillips
1989	Nominated	International Fantasy Film Award	Best Film for Fright Night Part 2

== Bibliography ==
- "The Devil (and Dino) Made Him Do It!" by Lee Gambin, Fangoria magazine No. 317, October 2012, pages 58–59. 97. Interview of screenwriter Tommy Lee Wallace regarding his scripting of Amityville II: The Possession. Three-page article has five photos, one of Wallace.
