= Back in the USSR (film) =

- Directed by: Deran Sarafian
- Written by: Lindsay Smith; Ilmar Taska
- Produced by: Lindsay Smith; Ilmar Taska
- Starring: Frank Whaley; Natalya Negoda; Roman Polanski
- Cinematography: Yuri Neyman
- Edited by: Ian Crafford
- Music by: Les Hooper; Rena Riffel
- Production companies: JVC Entertainment; Largo International
- Distributed by: 20th Century Fox
- Release date: February 7, 1992
- Running time: 87 minutes
- Country: USA
- Languages: English; Russian
- Box office: $501,036 (USA)

Back in the USSR is a 1992 American thriller film directed by Deran Sarafian and starring Frank Whaley, Natalya Negoda and Roman Polanski. Written and produced by Ilmar Taska and Lindsay Smith.

== Plot ==
Set in Moscow during the last years of the Soviet Union, with Gorbachev's glasnost and perestroika in full swing, the film follows Archer Sloan, a young American student from Chicago, who arrives hoping to sample the delights of Moscow, but runs into a number of people interested in stolen art works.

== Cast ==
- Frank Whaley as Archer Sloan
- Natalya Negoda as Lena
- Roman Polanski as Kurilov
- Andrew Divoff as Dimitro
- Dey Young as Claudia
- Ravil Isyanov as Georgi
- Harry Ditson as Whittier
- Brian Blessed as Chazov
- Constantine Gregory as Stanley
- Boris Romanov as father Pyotr
- Vsevolod Safonov as Ivan
- Yuri Sarantsev as concierge
- Oleg Anofriyev as taxi driver
