= Little Vera =

1988 film by Vasili Pichul

- Promotional film poster
- Russian: Маленькая Вера
- Directed by: Vasili Pichul
- Written by: Mariya Khmelik
- Starring: Natalya Negoda
- Cinematography: Yefim Reznikov
- Edited by: Yelena Zabolotskaya
- Music by: Vladimir Matetsky
- Production company: Gorky Film Studio
- Distributed by: International Film Exchange
- Release date: October 1988
- Running time: 135 minutes
- Country: Soviet Union
- Language: Russian

Little Vera (Russian: Маленькая Вера, romanized: Malenkaya Vera), produced by Gorky Film Studio and released in 1988, is a film by Russian film director Vasili Pichul. The title in Russian is ambiguous and can also mean "Little Faith", symbolizing the characters' lack of hope (or a glimmer thereof).

The film was the leader in ticket sales in the Soviet Union in 1988 with 54.9 million viewers, and was the most successful Soviet film in the US since the 1980 Moscow Does Not Believe in Tears. Part of its popularity was due to being one of the first Soviet movies with an explicit sexual scene.

The film's main character and namesake is a teenage girl, who just having finished school feels trapped in her provincial town. With its pessimistic and cynical view of Soviet society, the film was typical of its time (perestroika), during which many such films, in the style known as "chernukha" (roughly "black stuff"), were released. The script was written in 1983, but no producer could be found for another four years, after glasnost became a reality.

The film received six awards and was nominated for eight more. Among its wins, it received "Best Actress" for Natalya Negoda at the Nika Awards in 1989. The film's director, Vasili Pichul, received the Special Jury Prize at the 1988 Montreal World Film Festival and FIPRESCI Prize at the 1988 Venice Film Festival.

The soundtrack's main theme consists of two songs performed by Sofia Rotaru "Bylo no proshlo" (It Was, But It Has Gone) and "Tol'ko etovo malo" (Only This Is Not Enough), "the leitmotif of the perestroika classic Little Vera".

== Plot ==
Young Vera is a girl around twenty who just finished school. Her parents want her to apply for university, but at the moment she prefers going out with her best friend, Lena, dancing, party and nightlife. Vera loves listening to American and Western European rock and pop music and wears clothes and make up inspired by some of her idols such as Madonna, Cyndi Lauper, and Debbie Harry. She lives with her mother and her alcoholic father, Kolya, who are becoming increasingly dissatisfied with her choice of friends and what they consider her decadent lifestyle. They wonder why she can't be more like her brother Victor, a doctor living in Moscow. At an underground dance party that is broken up by police, she meets Sergei, and they immediately fall in love. It turns out Sergei is an old friend of Victor, who, in town for a visit, calls on his friend only to find him alone with his sister.

Vera and Sergei decide to marry, but her parents object. Vera convinces them to accept the planned marriage by falsely telling her mother she is pregnant. Sergei's first meeting with her parents is disastrous, and he leaves with Vera without finishing dinner, but he soon comes to live with them.

The tension between Sergei and Kolya increases and comes to a climax on Kolya's birthday. Fed up with the drunken Kolya, Sergei locks him in the bathroom, where Kolya breaks the basin. When he is let out of the bathroom, he stabs Sergei in the side with a knife, the wound requiring a long convalescence in the hospital.

Vera's mother tries to convince her to tell the authorities that Sergei accidentally caused the wound to himself, to avoid Kolya being sent to prison. Victor, visiting from Moscow, prescribes tranquilizers to calm the despondent Vera. The family goes to the beach for a picnic, ostensibly to help take Vera's mind off the situation. Vera believes, however, that it is a ruse to persuade her to lie about the stabbing. A storm suddenly comes up, and as the family prepares to leave, Vera is nowhere to be found. Kolya searches for her and the two are seen embracing on the beach.

Vera testifies that her father was not to blame for what happened to Sergei. She visits him in the hospital and explains that the family needed Kolya to survive. Sergei now seems uninterested in her, and tells her to go away.

Back home at with her parents, she finds herself alone and starts drinking and taking the pills. Victor arrives and rescues her. Sergei escapes from the hospital and soon arrives on the scene.

When Vera asked Sergei why he came back, he replies, "Because I was scared". As the film ends, Vera asks Sergei if he loves her.

Kolya sits alone in the kitchen once Vera has been put to bed. He slowly collapses and calls out to Victor and then Vera. It is assumed that he dies.

A subplot involves Andrey, a former classmate of Vera, who is infatuated with her and wants her to marry him. At the beginning of the film, Andrey is about to leave for naval training and attempts to persuade Vera to come home with him, but she spurns his advances. Later, she meets him on her way home from the hospital after visiting Sergei. He explains that he is on leave for only one day and again tries to arrange a tryst, only to have Vera resort to physical violence to fend him off when he attempts to force himself on her.

== Principal cast ==
- Natalya Negoda – Vera
- Andrey Sokolov – Sergei
- Yuri Nazarov – Kolya (Vera's father)
- Lyudmila Zaytseva – Rita (Vera's mother)
- Alexandra Tabakova – Lenka Chistyakova (Vera's best friend)
- Alexander Lenkov – Mikhail Petrovich
- Aleksandr Negreba (billed as Aleksandr Alekseyev-Nyegreba) – Victor (Vera's brother)
- Andrei Fomin – Andrey

== Interpretation ==
Little Vera shocked the Soviets with its depiction of an ordinary Russian family in a dull industrial town. Vera (вера) means 'faith' in Russian, but Vera's life is a life in a vacuum. The lack of physical and psychological space in her apartment and her consistent dependence on the men around her makes her an accurate figure of a young woman from a blue-collar Russian family that time.

Natalya Negoda, who played Vera, talked about the character in an interview in 1989: "It's our tragedy to have so little faith. The Russian people used to be very religious; then, they lost their faith in God. At the same time, they lost faith in themselves, in their sense of life."

Vera's parents, Kolya and Rita, are played by two stars of the Soviet era, whose typical roles as socialist realists are inverted in the film. Kolya is an unsuccessful and nondomineering father figure. He longs for love from his family rather pathetically, shouting "no one loves me" when he suffers a heart attack, and frets over Sergei for not drinking and not working, and later stabs him in a quarrel. Rita, Vera's mother, is depicted as distant and hostile to Vera. She does not offer Vera any maternal support, and at the family picnic scene by the sea, she shouts at Vera, "I never wanted to have you anyway."

Every scene of the film seems to start on a congenial note but breaks down eventually. Vera starts her affair with Sergei passionately, but is unable to reconcile the eccentric Sergei with her family. In a conversation with Chistyakova after she is married, she says, "it's supposed to be the happiest time of my life. And I feel like howling." And the romance-loving, poetic Chistyakova, in turn, gets into a similar situation with the middle-aged Mikhail Petrovich, who keeps her from going to school. The film explores a limited reality of life, as characters have neither the hope nor the consciousness that is common in classic Soviet films. The films ends with Victor leaving his family for his job immediately after Vera's attempted suicide, and Kolya passing away under a heart attack on the kitchen floor.

== Production ==
Little Vera is directed by Vasily Pichul, who was then 28-year-old, and written by his wife, Maria Khmelik. The movie is filmed in the port city of Zhdanov (now Mariupol), where Pichul was born and raised. Using the brackish water of the port as his primary motif, Pitchul shot the picture in a ragged, off-the-cuff style, adding images of the polluted waterfront and rusting machinery. Many elements in the filming of Little Vera are said to mirror America's own period of social opening-up in the 1950s.

== Reception ==
Little Vera has an approval rating of 100% on review aggregator website Rotten Tomatoes, based on 5 reviews, and an average rating of 7.4/10.

It was advertised as the first Soviet film to honestly explore the youth rebellion and discontent with the system. The film frankly takes side with the youth against the authority, depicting the police as repressive and uncaring of the fate of the people. Vera's sarcastic line before her lovemaking with Sergei: "In our country, we have but one goal: communism." reportedly became famous in the USSR after the release of film in 1989.

The film was a profound innovation in its portrayal of typical Soviet family life. Negoda became the first Soviet actress to appear naked in an explicit sex scene. Negoda also posed nude for Playboy with the headline "From Russia, With Love" to help the film launch in America. As the Soviet Union's first sex symbol, Negoda is said to have received so many obscene letters after the release of the film that she told the New York Times in March 1989 that she didn't even open letters anymore. The film was able to attract more than 50 million Soviet movie-goers, largely thanks to its unprecedented sex scenes.

== Influence ==
Little Vera is one of the breakthrough movies of the glasnost era. Tearing down the facade of socialist realism, the film portrays honestly a provincial Russian family supported by an alcoholic father, their meaningless works, and the aimless youth around them. This portrayal is credited with being representative of the Soviet population at the time, as Natalya Negoda said in an interview, "If the movie weren't so true, it wouldn't be so popular."
