= The Comrades of Summer =

- Genre: Comedy; Sport
- Written by: Robert Rodat
- Directed by: Tommy Lee Wallace
- Starring: Joe Mantegna; Natalya Negoda
- Music by: William Olvis
- Countries of origin: United States; Canada; Russia
- Original languages: English; Russian

Production
- Producers: Tim Braine; David Pritchard
- Production locations: Nat Bailey Stadium, Vancouver, British Columbia, Canada; Moscow, Russia
- Cinematography: David Leiterman; Richard Leiterman
- Editor: Stephen E. Rivkin
- Running time: 96 minutes
- Production company: HBO Pictures

Original release
- Network: HBO
- Release: July 11, 1992

The Comrades of Summer is a 1992 television film featuring Joe Mantegna and Natalya Negoda. It was directed by Tommy Lee Wallace, written by Robert Rodat and aired on HBO on July 11, 1992.

== Plot ==
Major League Baseball manager Sparky Smith is fired from his job with the Seattle Mariners. His attitude has gotten him into trouble with George, the owner of the Mariners, and no other team seems to want any part of him.

The Olympic Games are coming up, however, and a spirit of glasnost exists in the post-Soviet Russia, which is trying to field its first Olympic baseball team. Sparky reluctantly accepts an offer to move to Moscow to coach the players, many of whom don't even know the game's fundamentals. The players are predictably inept at first, but Sparky begins to learn the real joy in baseball is in the effort and the camaraderie. Along the way, Sparky also falls in love with young Russian girl Tanya Belova. However, Sparky's ultimate goal of returning to America and the Major Leagues hinders his making a full commitment to either the team or to Tanya.

A tour is ultimately arranged where Sparky's Soviet team plays several spring training games against Major League Baseball clubs, culminating in a match-up with Sparky's old team, the Mariners. Although they fail to win a game, the Soviets' respectable play is admired and Sparky receives Big League job offers. But inspired by his team's commitment and progress, Sparky decides to stay with his team and Tanya.

== Cast ==
- Joe Mantegna as "Sparky" Smith
- Natalya Negoda as Tanya
- Michael Lerner as George
- Mark Rolston as Voronov

== Production ==
Filming took place in Nat Bailey Stadium, Vancouver, British Columbia, Canada, and in Moscow, Russia.

== Reception ==
Variety in their review said, "Robert Rodat’s script for this high-concept comedy is mechanical, and the direction by Tommy Lee Wallach is routine at best. One senses here an unfortunate unfamiliarity with comedic material–an even more acute problem, given that there is so little of it."

== See also ==
- List of baseball films
