= Prediction (film) =

- Directed by: Eldar Ryazanov
- Written by: Eldar Ryazanov
- Starring: Oleg Basilashvili; Irène Jacob; Andrey Sokolov
- Cinematography: Valery Shuvalov
- Music by: Andrey Petrov
- Production companies: Mosfilm, Orly film
- Release date: 24 November 1993
- Running time: 113 minutes
- Countries: Soviet Union, France
- Language: Russian

Prediction (Russian: Предсказание, romanized: Predskazaniye) is a 1993 Russian film directed by Eldar Ryazanov and is based on his eponymous novella. The film is a fantastical melodrama and thriller.

== Plot ==
Famous writer Oleg Goryunov returns to troublous Moscow from a creative writing trip. The confrontation between president Boris Yeltsin and the Supreme Soviet is in full swing, tanks, armored personnel carriers and armed soldiers are on the streets. At the train station a gypsy woman accosts Goryunov and offers to tell his fortunes. He takes it with humor, but suddenly he hears the unexpected ... he shall have some unusual meeting, and the worst thing is that in exactly 24 hours Goryunov shall die.

The writer, shook up by such grim predictions, comes home and finds in his apartment ... himself, another Oleg Goryunov, only very young. Shocked, "old Goryunov" tries to find out from "young Goryunov" why they had to meet, but it still remains a mystery ...

Realizing that he has only one day to live, before his death Oleg Goryunov decides to do two most important things, the pursuit of which the writer has constantly postponed. Firstly, Goryunov wants to avenge the death of his father. Many years ago his father was killed by a KGB agent, a certain Poplavskiy, a chemist specialized in poisoning. As a fellow traveler on the train Poplavskiy would get into contact with people targeted by Soviet secret police and poisoned them, so that their deaths looked like a heart attack or a stroke. Both "Goryunovs" come to the research institute where the former executioner works, and demand Poplavskiy to make a guilty plea. Trying to escape retribution for his crimes, the poisoner drinks the deadly substance himself ...

But the most important thing that Oleg Goryunov decides to do — is to finally confess his love to charming Lyudmila, who works as a cashier in a bank. She reciprocates his feelings, they are together, they are happy, but the harsh reality of life is ready to destroy the lovers. And only "young Oleg Goryunov" is able to save them all...

== Cast ==
- Oleg Basilashvili as Oleg Goryunov, famous writer
- Irène Jacob as Ludmila Egorova, bank cashier (voiced by Anna Kamenkova-Pavlova)
- Andrey Sokolov as Oleg Goryunov in his youth
- Aleksei Zharkov as Igor Poplawski, chemist and former KGB agent
- Aleksandr Pashutin as conductor on the Red Arrow train
- Roman Kartsev as patriot and anti-communist
- Caroline Silhol as Oksana, former Goryunov's wife
- Irena Morozova as gypsy fortune teller at the train station
- Irina Nekrasova as gypsy fortune teller at the airport
- Michael Pärnu as member of Russian patriots party
- Sergei Stepanchenko as taxi driver
- Victor El'tsov as investigator
- Alexander Rezalin as man at the cemetery

== Filming ==
- According to the memoirs of Eldar Ryazanov, at the beginning of the shooting Irene Jacob did not speak any Russian. He offered Irene to speak in French, but she categorically refused. Jacob memorized Russian text written in Latin letters, so in the film her articulation and movement of the lips is exactly met by the original Russian pronunciation.
- This is one of the few Ryazanov's movies in which he did not participate as an actor.
