= True Noon (film) =

- Directed by: Nosir Saidov
- Written by: Safar Haqdadov
- Produced by: Rustami Joni
- Starring: Yuriy Nazarov, Nasiba Sharipova, Nasriddin Nuriddinov, Shadi Saleh
- Cinematography: Georgi Dzalayev
- Edited by: Dilovar Sultonov
- Music by: Daler Nazarov
- Distributed by: Small Talk Inc.
- Release date: 2009
- Running time: 83 minutes
- Country: Tajikistan
- Language: Tajik

True Noon (Tajik transliteration: Qiyomi roz) is a 2009 Tajik film directed by Nosir Saidov. It was chosen as official selection in 2009 for the International Film Festival Rotterdam. True Noon became the first Tajik film which made it to distribution in Tajikistan in 18 years, i.e. since independence. It was also aired at the Marrakech International Film Festival.

The film was originally funded by Talco Management, a domestic company. However, the funding stopped due to the economic crisis, and Saidov had to search for funding in Europe.

The film deals with the changes and unease caused in the common man's life by the government, about which he cares nothing. The state acts only to control its citizens and does not add anything to their life. The film portrays the effects of the change of the borders between Tajikistan and Uzbekistan (not explicitly named in the film), which leads to the erecting of a new fence between two villages and the people's basic instinct to resist this arbitrary change. The film is largely absurdist and humorous, while dealing with weighty matters.

== Plot ==
The story takes place in a village of Tajikistan, with another close village in the background. Nilufar (Nasiba Sharipova) is a pretty girl living in a village near the border. She is an assistant to Kirill (Yuriy Nazarov), the Russian operator of a climate observatory on a hill. He has trained her to make observations with the instruments used there. The meteorologist is an old man and has been separated from his family for a long time. He wants to go home, but no replacement has been sent yet, and communications with the central bureau have been disrupted. He decides to transfer his responsibility to Nilufar, after her marriage with Aziz of the next village. But on the day of the engagement, soldiers come and plant barbed wire to separate the two villages. The life of the people, who have thus far enjoyed peace, now falls into severe chaos. The school is in the lower village, as is the clinic and the people of the upper village are not allowed to cross the border except at the nearest border crossing, 50 km away. The biggest problem is Nilufar's wedding. The military has gone so far as to place mines along the fence. Using a home-built metal detector, Kirill tries his best to help the wedding party to cross the mined borders. They manage to do so, but in the closing scene, Kirill steps on a mine he failed to find, and apparently loses his life to allow the young couple to join.

The name of the film originates from the determination of true noon, one of the tasks Nilufar has at the climate observatory, which she discusses with Kirill.
