= Robert Rodat =

American screenwriter and television producer

- Born: 1959 or 1960 (age 65–66); Keene, New Hampshire, U.S.
- Education: Colgate University (BA); Harvard Business School (MBA); University of Southern California (MFA)
- Occupations: Writer, producer
- Years active: 1992–present

Robert Rodat (born c. 1960) is an American screenwriter and producer of film and television. He is known for writing the films Saving Private Ryan (1998), which earned him Academy Award and Golden Globe Award nominations for Best Original Screenplay; Fly Away Home (1996), The Patriot (2000), and The Catcher Was a Spy (2018). He is also the creator of the television series Falling Skies (2011–15) and Those About to Die (2024).

== Life and career ==
Rodat was born in Keene, New Hampshire. His father was a World War II veteran. He attended Colgate University, Harvard Business School, and the University of Southern California.

He wrote Saving Private Ryan (1998), The Comrades of Summer (1992), Tall Tale (1995), Fly Away Home with Vince McKewin (1996), and The Patriot (2000). He worked on the revision of the script for the 2008 film 10,000 BC and helped with the story of 2013 film Thor: The Dark World. Rodat also contributed to a screenplay for a film adaptation of Warcraft, work that was ultimately rebooted with the exit of the film's then-attached director, Sam Raimi.

In 2009, Rodat created the TNT science-fiction series Falling Skies, produced by Steven Spielberg. The series did not premiere until summer 2011. Its fifth and final season was broadcast in the summer of 2015. The show is about human survivors of a semi-post apocalyptic world due to an alien invasion.

In 2022, Rodat created the Peacock period drama series Those About to Die. The series premiered on July 18, 2024.

== Filmography ==
=== Film ===
Year	Title	Director	Notes	Ref.
1995	Tall Tale	Jeremiah Chechik	with Steven L. Bloom	
1996	Fly Away Home	Carroll Ballard	with Vince McKerwin	
1998	Saving Private Ryan	Steven Spielberg		
2000	The Patriot	Roland Emmerich		
2008	10,000 BC	Roland Emmerich	Uncredited revision	
2013	Thor: The Dark World	Alan Taylor	Co-wrote story with Don Payne	
2018	The Catcher Was a Spy	Ben Lewin		
2018	Kursk	Thomas Vinterberg		

=== Television ===
Year	Title	Creator	Writer	Exec. Producer	Notes	Ref.
1992	The Comrades of Summer	No	Yes	No	TV movie	
1999	36 Hours to Die	No	Yes	No	TV movie	
2011–15	Falling Skies	Yes	Yes	Yes	Writer; episode: "Live and Learn"; Exec. producer; 20 episodes	
2024	Those About to Die	Yes	No	Yes	10 episodes	

== Awards and nominations ==
Award	Year	Category	Work	Result	Ref.
Academy Award	1999	Best Original Screenplay	Saving Private Ryan	Nominated	
Christopher Award	1997	Motion Pictures	Fly Away Home	Nominated	
Golden Globe Award	1999	Best Screenplay - Motion Picture	Saving Private Ryan	Nominated	
Humanitas Prize	1999	Feature Film	Saving Private Ryan	Nominated	
Satellite Award	1999	Best Original Screenplay	Saving Private Ryan	Nominated	
Writers Guild of America Award	1999	Best Original Screenplay	Saving Private Ryan	Nominated	
