= The Fields (film) =

- Promotional poster
- Directed by: Tom Mattera; Dave Mazzoni
- Written by: Harrison Smith
- Produced by: Harrison Smith; Tom Mattera; Dave Mazzoni; Faust Checho; George Englund, Jr. Jonathan Ilchert
- Starring: Cloris Leachman; Tara Reid; Bev Appleton; Faust Checho; Brian Anthony Wilson; Karen Ludwig; Joshua Ormond
- Cinematography: Daniel Watchulonis
- Edited by: Tom Mattera; Dave Mazzoni
- Music by: John Avarese
- Production companies: Expressway Productions; MazWa Productions; Mr. Big Productions
- Distributed by: Fabrication Films; Breaking Glass Pictures
- Release dates: September 24, 2011 (Buffalo Niagara Film Festival); April 24, 2012 (United States)
- Running time: 100 minutes
- Country: United States
- Language: English
- Budget: $18.1 million

The Fields is a 2011 American suspense thriller directed by Tom Mattera and Dave Mazzoni. The film is touted as being a "semi-autobiographical account" of what happened to Harrison Smith, the film's writer, as a boy growing up on a grandparents' farm on the outskirts of Easton, Pennsylvania. The film stars Cloris Leachman and Tara Reid. Filming wrapped in October 2009, and the film played in festivals in Fall 2011.

== Plot ==
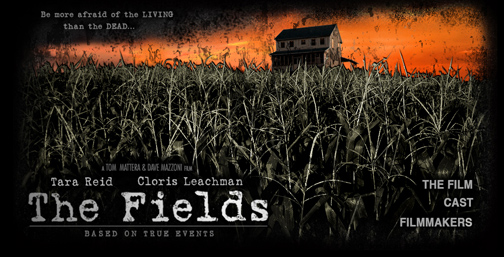
The Fields website

The film takes place in a Pennsylvania town outside Easton, in 1973, and tells the story of a young boy (Joshua Ormond) and his family (Tara Reid, Faust Checho, Cloris Leachman, and Bev Appleton) as they are terrorized by an unseen presence in the surrounding fields.

As a young boy, Steven deals with a very difficult home life, as his parents are constantly at odds. After a potentially dangerous incident, Steven's mother sends him to stay with his grandparents on their farm for a few weeks. Soon after he arrives, an unseen presence begins terrorizing the farmhouse, using the massive surrounding cornfields to remain hidden.

== Cast ==
- Tara Reid as Bonnie
- Cloris Leachman as Gladys
- Bev Appleton as Hiney
- Joshua Ormond as Steven
- Faust Checho as Barry
- Brian Anthony Wilson as Charlie
- Miles Williams as Jack
- Karen Ludwig as Tootie
- Max Antisell as Douglas
- Louis Morabito as Eugene
- Renee McCartney as Sue
- Danielle Treuberg as Hippie Girl #3

== Production ==
The film was produced by Faust Checho with Mr. Big Productions, in association with MazWa Productions. Tommy Lee Wallace was attached as an associate producer. Production spanned six weeks, throughout September and October 2009, and was shot on location in the Pocono Mountains region in Bartonsville, Pennsylvania and in Kunkletown, Pennsylvania. Some scenes were filmed in one of the oldest amusement parks, Bushkill Park in Easton, Pennsylvania, which opened in 1902.

== Release ==
The film was anticipated to be released in late 2011, it was finally released on April 24, 2012 in the USA on DVD and Blu-ray by Breaking Glass Pictures.
