= Fresh Fest Beer Fest =

Annual beer festival in Pittsburgh, US

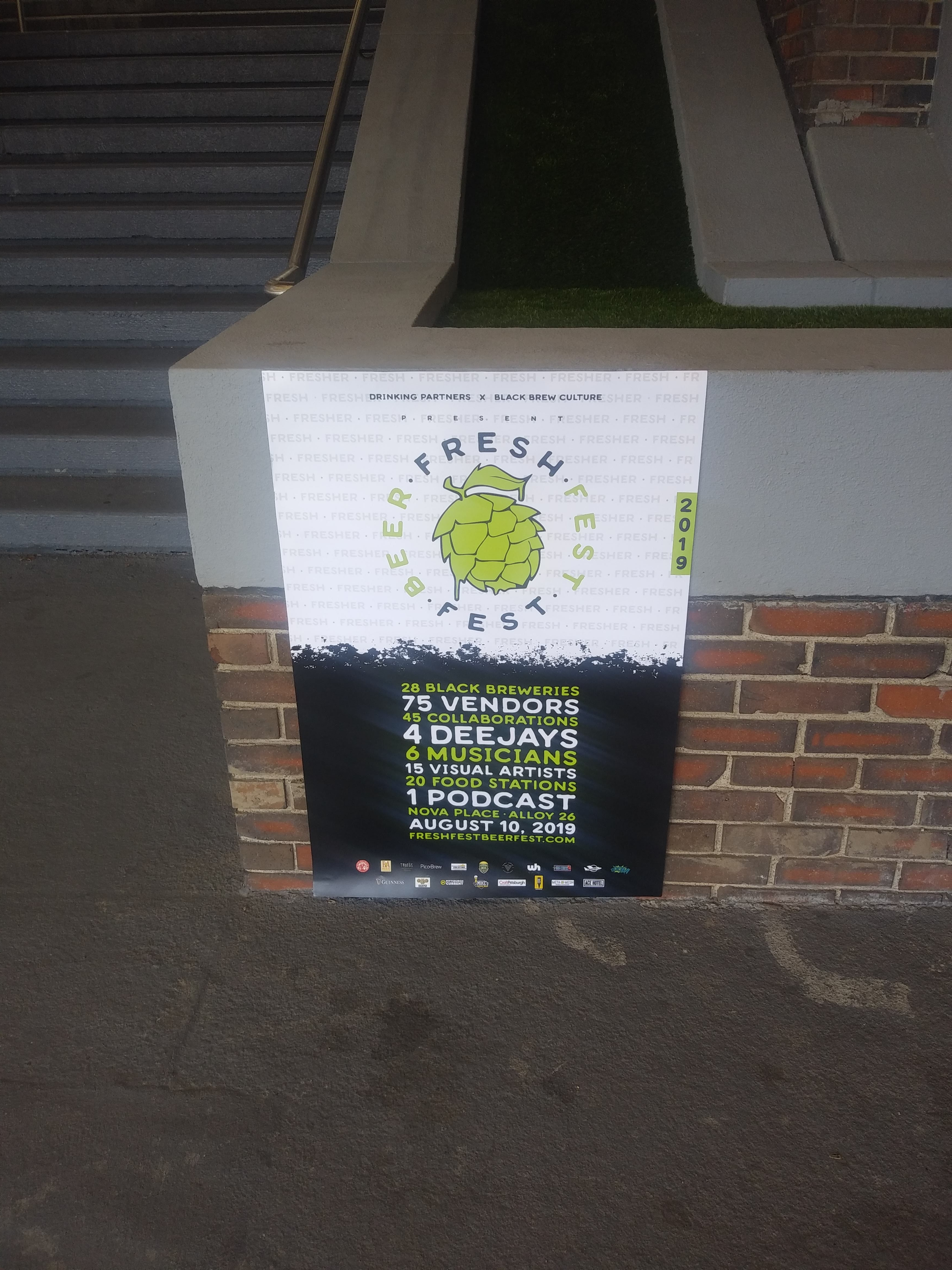
- Publicity poster for Fresh Fest 2019
- Begins: August
- Ends: August
- Frequency: Annual
- Location: Pittsburgh, Pennsylvania
- Years active: Since 2018
- Participants: more than 1,200 (2018)

Fresh Fest Beer Fest is a beer festival held annually in Pittsburgh, Pennsylvania, since 2018. Geared towards increasing diversity in the craft beer industry, Fresh Fest is the nation's first festival for Black-owned breweries.

== Origins ==
Fresh Fest was conceived by podcast hosts Day Bracey and Ed Bailey of the Drinking Partners Podcast, and entrepreneur Mike Potter of Black Brew Culture. Citing a lack of diversity in craft beer brewers and consumers, the creators sought both to bring together Black-owned breweries and provide and inclusive space to connect beer drinkers. In addition to Black-owned breweries nationwide, Fresh Fest also showcases Pittsburgh-area breweries through partnerships with local Black businesses, entrepreneurs, politicians, and other personalities.

== Location ==
The 2018 and 2019 Fresh Fests were held at Nova Place on Pittsburgh's North Shore. Since 2021, Fresh Fest's a block party in Pittsburgh's Allentown neighbourhood. The COVID-19 pandemic caused 2020's cancellation of most events, and some had gone virtual.

== See also ==
- Craft beer
- List of breweries in Pennsylvania
- List of festivals in Pennsylvania
