= Tom Mattera =

American filmmaker, writer and producer (born 1979)

- Born: 27 January 1979 (age 46); Philadelphia, PA, USA.
- Occupation(s): Film director, Producer & Screenwriter

Tom Mattera (born 27 January 1979) is an American filmmaker, writer and producer.

== Early life ==
Mattera was born and grew up in South Philadelphia. Tom Mattera and Dave Mazzoni teamed up during childhood in Philadelphia where they began their creative collaboration on film. Their first screenplay, Mectl, was selected as one of the top 250 out of 5,500 submissions in HBO’s Project Greenlight Competition in 2003.

Mattera graduated with a B.A. in Film and Media Arts in 2004 from Temple University. He also holds a B.S. in Civil & Construction Engineering from Temple University which he received in 2002.

== Career ==
=== The 4th Dimension ===
Tom Mattera directed his first feature film with Dave Mazzoni, The 4th Dimension, in 2006. Mattera and Mazzoni made the film for $75,000. The film won the Grand Jury Honorable Mention Award at CineVegas in 2006, the Technical Achievement Award at the Philadelphia Film Festival, and went on to screen at over 20 international film festivals. Michael Rechtshaffen of The Hollywood Reporter described the film as "stylistically channeling" the works of David Lynch and Darren Aronofsky.

=== The Fields ===
Mazzoni and Mattera directed their second independent feature, The Fields, a thriller starring Cloris Leachman and Tara Reid, released in 2011. The film takes place in a small Pennsylvania town in 1973, and tells the story of a young boy and his family as they are terrorized by an unseen presence in the surrounding fields. Production spanned six weeks, throughout September and October 2009, and was shot entirely on location in the Pocono Mountains region in Kunkletown, Pennsylvania. The Fields was signed to distribution company Breaking Glass pictures.

== Filmography ==
Film	Year	Credits	Awards
The 4th Dimension	2006	Director; Writer; Producer; Editor	Grand Jury Honorable Mention at CineVegas; Technical Achievement at the Philadelphia International Film Festival
The Fields	2011	Director; Producer; Editor	N/A
