= Tambourine, Drum =

- Russian: Бубен, барабан
- Directed by: Aleksey Mizgiryov
- Written by: Aleksey Mizgiryov
- Produced by: Ruben Dishdishyan; Andrei Rydanov
- Starring: Natalya Negoda; Elena Lyadova; Dmitriy Kulichkov; Sergey Neudachin; Aleksandr Alyoshkin
- Cinematography: Vadim Deyev
- Production companies: Itaka Film; Central Partnership
- Release date: June 13, 2009 (Kinotavr)
- Running time: 105 min.
- Country: Russia
- Language: Russian
- Budget: $ 2 million
- Box office: $ 14 800

Tambourine, Drum (Russian: Бубен, барабан, romanized: Buben, barsban) is a 2009 Russian drama film directed by Aleksey Mizgiryov.

The Silver Leopard for Best Director at the Locarno Film Festival and the Golden Eagle Award for Best Actress (Natalya Negoda).

== Plot ==
The film tells about the head of the library, Katya, who falls in love with a sailor who leaves her for her friend. As a result, Katya is ready to give the apartment to someone who kills her opponent.

== Cast ==
- Natalya Negoda as Katya
- Elena Lyadova as Katya's friend
- Dmitriy Kulichkov as sailor
- Sergey Neudachin as Igor
- Aleksandr Alyoshkin as Andrey
- Oleg Vasilkov as Ignat
- Irina Obidina as Ignat's wife
- Liubomiras Laucevicius as episode
- Sergey Sosnovsky as Katya's father
- Nadezhda Kobzeva as Tamara

== Critical response ==
Vasily Koretsky (TimeOut Russia) noted: "The problems here are as old as 'The Cherry Orchard', and I'm afraid they're eternal: non-possessiveness versus worldly wisdom, the intelligentsia versus the merchants, and beliefs versus reality. The eternal hypocritical duality of the Russian consciousness (on the one hand, it's shameful to steal, but on the other hand, it's impossible not to steal) takes on the scale of an all-encompassing existential conflict in the film".
