= Fred G. Johnson =

American sideshow banner artist (1892–1990)

Tattooed Girl by Johnson

Fred G. Johnson (January 1892, Chicago, Illinois – 11 May 1990, Sun City, Arizona) was a prolific sideshow banner artist whose career spanned 65 years. His banner paintings were displayed at the Chicago World's Fair of 1933, called A Century of Progress, and by circuses such as Ringling Brothers, Barnum & Bailey, and Clyde Beatty. He has been called the "Picasso" of circus art.

Fred Johnson, one of nine boys in a Chicago family, was employed at age 14 as an errand boy by the United States Tent & Awning Co. of Chicago, but was soon dismissed for neglecting his work to play baseball. He was hired by banner painter Harry Carlton Cummins to clean equipment and tack up banners. Cummins also taught him to paint banners, though he never received any formal art training. Johnson resumed working for the United States Tent & Awning Co. after World War I, producing banners for owners Walter and Charles Driver between 1921 and 1930.

Sideshow and circus banners first appeared in Europe during the early 1800s. Hung outside shows or booths, they served the same function as that of decorative shop signs, advertising the contents within. At the height of their popularity from the 1870s to the late 1960s, sideshow banners were strung up at carnivals and traveling shows throughout the world. Early circuses routinely used brightly painted ones to lure paying customers to their quirky sideshows of freaks and curiosities – snake charmers, sword swallowers, two-headed babies and five-legged cows were some of the exaggerated attractions offered for 'your shock and amazement for just five cents!'. Circus banners were usually about 8 feet (2.4 m) high, but commissions could be any size. The largest Johnson ever produced was 50 feet (15 m) by 15 feet (4.6 m) "for a bughouse" which took him about 40 hours. On average, however, he turned out four a day. He also painted the side-panels on circus trailers and merry-go-rounds.

Charles Driver later started his own business, taking Johnson with him. When it went bankrupt, Johnson continued to paint banners in a garage on Chicago's northwest side. Undaunted, Driver joined the O. Henry Tent & Awning Co., persuading Johnson to follow him. Johnson worked for that company for some 40 years from 1934 to 1974.

He later retired at the age of 89 and moved to Sun City, Arizona. He died May 11, 1990, at the age of 98. He was survived by son Ellsworth, three grandchildren and five great-grandchildren.

Most of his banners were lost, but survivors are preserved in circus museums in Baraboo, Wisconsin – home to Ringling Brothers – and Sarasota, Florida. as well as in the Carl Hammer gallery. Some were auctioned by Sotheby's in 1981, with titles such as "Minnie Ha-Ha the Monkey Girl" and "Dickie the Penguin Boy". In July 1989, the State of Illinois Art Center Gallery had an exhibit of his work. His works were subsequently shown by the Rockford Art Museum in 1991, which showcased “Fat Man”, an early work that had not been displayed prior.

== In popular culture ==
- On the Season 3, Episode 1 episode of American Pickers on the History Channel, initially broadcast on December 6, 2010, pickers Mike Wolfe and Frank Fritz visit Bushkill Park in Easton, Pennsylvania, where they purchase two sideshow banners. Appraiser William Leroy later identifies one of them as being by Johnson, which Leroy values at over $5,000 despite not being in the best of shape.

== Bibliography ==
- Fred G. Johnson: Sideshow Banners – Debora D. Donato (Editor), State of Illinois Art Gallery, Randy J. Johnson (Fred Johnson's grandson) (1989), ISBN 978-0-89792-123-7
- American Sideshow Banners as Folk Art – Emery Christian Weimer, B.A.
- Freak Show: Sideshow Banner Art – Gideon Bosker
- Freaks, Geeks and Strange Girls: Sideshow Banners of the Great American Midway – Randy Johnson
- Circus and Carnival Ballyhoo: Sideshow Freaks, Jabbers and Blade Box Queens – A. W. Stencell
- American Circus Posters – Charles Philip Fox
- Freaks, Geeks, and Strange Girls – Teddy Varndell
