= Amanat (2022 film) =

- Directed by: Anton Sivers; Rauf Kubayev
- Written by: Shamil Djafarov; Amet Magomedov; Anton Sivers; Rauf Kubayev
- Produced by: Shamil Djafarov; Vadim Goryainov; Dmitry Domnin; Andrey Korobov
- Starring: Arslan Murzabekov; Amin Khuratov; Varvara Komarova; Andrey Sokolov; Yekaterina Guseva; Daniil Strakhov
- Cinematography: Anton Drozdov-Schastlivtsev
- Edited by: Olga Proshkina
- Music by: Artyom Vasilev; Vladimir Takinov
- Production company: Dagger Film
- Distributed by: KaroRental
- Release date: 26 May 2022
- Running time: 120 minutes
- Country: Russia
- Language: Russian
- Budget: ₽250 million
- Box office: ₽50 million

Amanat (Russian: Аманат) is a 2022 Russian historical war film directed by Anton Sivers and Rauf Kubayev. The main military history of the Russian Empire in the first half of the 19th century, after the Siege of Akhoulgo, the main conflict of the Caucasian War of 1817-1864.

This film was theatrically released on May 26, 2022 by KaroRental.

== Plot ==
The film takes place in the middle of the 19th century, during the Caucasian War. In 1839, Imam Shamil transferred his son Jamalutdin to the Russian Empire as an amanat or hostage.

At the age of nine, the boy became a pupil of the imperial court of Nicholas I, enlisted in the army and became a lieutenant. The passionate Caucasian young man fell in love with General Olenin's daughter Elisabeth Olenina at first sight and intended to marry her. However, the blood father confused his plans, exchanging his son for the captive granddaughters of Georgian King George XII, and returned him to his father's house. Jamalutdin has to make a difficult choice between his duty to his people and honor, as well as his love and feelings for Lisa Olenina.

== Cast ==
- Arslan Murzabekov as Imam Shamil
- Amin Khuratov as Lieutenant Jamalutdin, the eldest son of Imam Shamil
  - Kamil Murzabekov as Jamalutdin in childhood
- Varvara Komarova as Elisabeth "Lisa" Olenina
  - Antonina Stepakova as Lisa Olenina in childhood
- Andrey Sokolov as Emperor Nicholas I of Russia
- Andrey Fomin as Emperor Alexander II of Russia
- Vitaly Kovalenko as Pyotr Olenin, Lisa and Alexey Olenin's father
- Yekaterina Guseva as Maria Olenina, Lisa and Alexey Olenin's mother
- Alexander Michkov as Alexey Olenin
  - Anton Nikishin as Alexey Olenin in childhood
- Daniil Strakhov as Mamonov
- Fyodor Lavrov as Semyon, a serf
- Farkhad Makhmudov as Mirza
- Vasili Michkov as General Leonty Dubelt, manager of the Third Department

== Production ==
Candidate of Historical Sciences and expert on the Caucasian war Patimat Takhnayeva, describing the historicity of the film, said that the script horrified her and that she considers the day of the premiere of the film "a day of national shame", and called the authors mankurts.

Principal photography started shooting in 2018 in Saint Petersburg and Dagestan.

=== Release ===
The premiere date in the Russian Federation has been set for May 26, 2022 by KaroRental.
