= Natalya Negoda =

Russian actress (born 1963)

- Наталья Негода
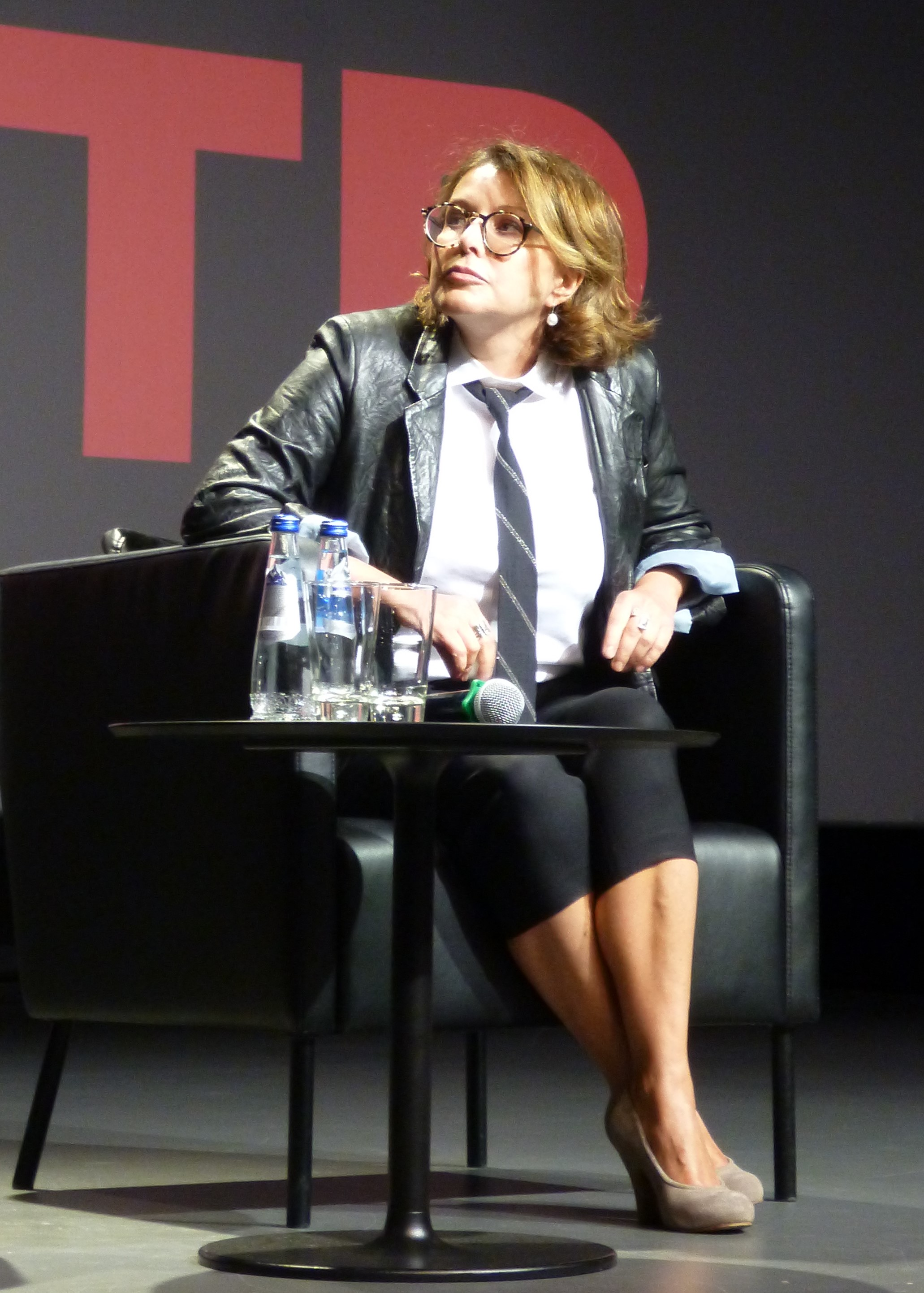
- Negodain 2020
- Born: November 12, 1963 (age 62); Moscow, Russia
- Education: Moscow Art Theatre School
- Occupation: Actress
- Years active: 1987–present

Natalya Igorevna Negoda (Russian: Ната́лья И́горевна Него́да; born 12 November 1963, Moscow) is a Russian actress best-known for her portrayal of Vera in the film Little Vera (Маленькая Вера) – the first ever Soviet film to include a sex scene. She later appeared in Playboy magazine.

Negoda moved to the United States in the early 1990s but returned to Russia in 2007. She has been a vocal critic of Vladimir Putin and his policies, and she signed a statement calling for the government to free Pussy Riot.

== Selected filmography ==
- Tomorrow Was the War (1987)
- Little Vera (1988)
- How Dark the Nights Are on the Black Sea (1989)
- Back in the USSR (1992)
- The Comrades of Summer (1992)
- Law & Order (1993)
- Tambourine, Drum (2009)
- Van Goghs (2018)
