= Roar on the Shore =

Coordinates: 42°7′46″N 80°5′7″W

- Genre: Motorcycle rally
- Frequency: Annually
- Locations: Erie, Pennsylvania and North East, Pennsylvania
- Founded: 2007
- Most recent: July 2019 (permanently canceled for 2021 forward)
- Patrons: Manufacturer and Business Association
- Website: www.roarontheshore.com

The Roar on the Shore was a motorcycle rally that took place in Erie, Pennsylvania and North East, Pennsylvania.

== History ==
The Roar on the Shore was started in 2007 by the Erie Port Authority as a way to bring visitors to Erie's bayfront. The Erie Port Authority partnered with other local organizations including ABATE, Erie Motorcycle Club, Legion Riders 773, Charities for Children and the Manufacturer's Association of Erie. In 2008, the Manufacturer's Association of Erie took the lead role in the rally. Its last event was in 2019. 2020 was cancelled on grounds of COVID-19 pandemic. It was announced in 2021 that Roar on the Shore would not return.

Historical attendance
Year	Est.	±%
2007	10,000	—
2008	25,000	+150.0%
2009	35,000	+40.0%
2010	50,000	+42.9%
2011	65,000	+30.0%
2012	85,000	+30.8%
2013	100,000	+17.6%
2014	115,000	+15.0%
2015	150,000	+30.4%
2016	165,000	+10.0%
2017	170,000	+3.0%
2020	0	−100.0%

== Events ==
Every year the rally was kicked off with "Bringin' In The Roar": a motorcycle parade from Presque Isle Downs and Casino in Summit Township to Lake Erie Speedway in North East. Other major events are the "Thunder On The Isle", a motorcycle ride around Presque Isle State Park, and the "Roar To The Vineyards Poker Run" to North East.

== See also ==
- List of festivals in Pennsylvania
