= The Executioner (1990 film) =

- Russian: Палач
- Directed by: Viktor Sergeyev
- Written by: Sergey Beloshnikov
- Starring: Irina Metlitskaya; Andrey Sokolov; Larisa Guzeeva; Sergey Gazarov; Boris Galkin
- Cinematography: Nikolai Stroganov
- Edited by: Lyudmila Obrazumova
- Music by: Eduard Artemyev
- Production company: Lenfilm
- Release date: 1990
- Running time: 157 min.
- Country: Soviet Union
- Language: Russian

The Executioner (Russian: Палач, romanized: Palach) is a 1990 Soviet drama film directed by Viktor Sergeyev. The film tells the story of journalist Olga Privalova who becomes a victim of rape. To take revenge on the rapists, she makes a deal with the criminals, however, circumstances begin to unfold unpredictably.

== Plot ==
Set in Leningrad in April 1990, the story follows Olga, a journalist who is brutally assaulted by three men—restaurant maître d' Igor, addiction specialist Viktor, and sculptor Sasha—while their fourth companion, Andrei, passively observes. Refusing to report the crime to the authorities, Olga instead decides to seek revenge independently. She begins by intimidating Svetlana, an accomplice who lured her to the attackers, into revealing their names. Selling her diamond earrings, Olga hires a local crime boss named Voldemar, asking him to “punish” her assailants however he sees fit. Soon, Igor’s daughter is violently assaulted, and Olga informs him that their score is settled, leaving the remaining attackers on edge. In a desperate attempt at appeasement, the men send Andrei to negotiate with Olga, but a confrontation ensues, and she stabs him in self-defense. Wounded, Andrei ends up recovering under Olga's care, while their conspirators become increasingly paranoid.

As Olga’s vendetta spirals, the other men attempt to escape their fates. Igor flees to Alushta with his family, while Sasha takes Igor's car but later dies in a car crash after tampering with its brakes. Viktor, meanwhile, is abducted by Voldemar's associates, who pretend to be KGB agents and leave him drug-addicted. Though Olga tries to halt the violence, she learns from Voldemar that the revenge "mechanism" is now beyond his control. Viktor ultimately dies from an overdose, and Sasha also perishes. Olga plans to escape with Andrei, but their vehicle is sabotaged, and while fleeing on a train, Andrei is fatally stabbed by one of Voldemar's men. In the end, Olga kills Voldemar in her home, haunted by a childhood memory of running to greet her naval officer father, who had gifted her a toy dog. The film closes with a vision of the young Olga running through the woods, joy replaced by a gunshot and a slow fall, symbolizing her tragic loss of innocence.

== Cast ==
- Irina Metlitskaya as Olga Privalova
- Andrey Sokolov as Andrey Arsentyev
- Larisa Guzeeva as Sveta
- Sergey Gazarov as Igor Pogodin
- Boris Galkin as Aleksandr Zavalishin
- Stanislav Sadalskiy as Viktor Goldner
- Aristarkh Livanov as Sergey Gavrilov
- Igor Ageev as doctor
- Yevgeni Aleksandrov as administrator
- Nikolai Kryukov as Olga's grandfather
- Aristarkh Livanov as Sergei Gavrilov
- Algis Matulionis as Waldemar
- Dmitry Nagiyev as the bartender
