= Yuriy Nazarov (actor) =

Soviet and Russian theater actor

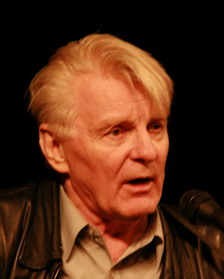
- Born: Yuriy Vladimirovich Nazarov; May 5, 1937 (age 89); Novosibirsk, Russian SFSR, Soviet Union
- Occupations: Actor, television

Yuriy Vladimirovich Nazarov (Russian: Ю́рий Влади́мирович Наза́ров; born 5 May 1937) is a Soviet and Russian actor and People's Artist of Russia for the year 2005.

== Biography ==
He was born Yuriy Vladimirovich Nazarov in Novosibirsk, Russian SFSR, Soviet Union. His father, Nikolai Aldomirovich Nazarov (1906–1971), was an ethnic Chechen Lieutenant of the Red Army, who served on the Eastern Front and in the Crimean offensive in 1944.

In 1989, Nazarov was nominated for a Nika Award as Best Actor in the film Little Vera playing Vera's father. Nazarov has appeared in the cinema of Russia since 1954. His most recent appearance was in Sophia, a TV series.

In his book "Not Only About Cinema" he describes himself as a communist.

Following the March 2014 annexation of Crimea, Nazarov signed a letter in support of the policies of Russian President Vladimir Putin regarding Ukraine and Crimea.

== Filmography ==
Yuriy Nazarov has starred in over 257 films and television productions.

Year	Title	Role	Notes
1962	The Third Half	Misha Skachko	
1964	Attack and Retreat	episode	
1966	Andrei Rublev	Prince Yury of Zvenigorod / Grand Duke Vasily I of Moscow	
1967	The Ballad of the Commissioner	Commissioner Fadeitsev	
1969	The Adjutant of His Excellency	Yemelyanov	
1969	Liberation	Russian Liberation Movement soldier	TV series
1969	The Red Tent	Anatoly Alekseyev	
1971	Dauria	Taras	
1972	Hot Snow	Sergeant Ukhanov	
1974	The Land of Sannikov	Gubin	
1975	Mirror	Military Instructor	
1978	The Tavern on Pyatnitskaya	Vanya Shlyonov	
1978	Father Sergius	Man On The Ferry	
1981	Alexander Little	Vasily Akimych Hrischanovich	
1982	Let's Get Married	Nikolai Suvorin	
1983	Behind the Blue Nights	Oleg	
1984	Very Important Person	Rodion Shishkin	
1984	What was Senka	Grandfather Saveliev	
1985	Do Not Marry, Girls	Chairman of The Commission	
1986	Attempted GOELRO	Viktor Burtsev	
1987	Team 33	Colonel Nikitin	
1988	Little Vera	Kolya, Vera's Father	
1989	How Dark the Nights Are on the Black Sea	Glazier	
1989	Entrance to the Labyrinth	District Pozdnyakov	
1991	Ghost	Aleksey Popov	
1994	Terminal Velocity	Mr. Moldova	uncredited
1999	Santa Lucia	Director	
2000	House for the Rich	Vladilen Serebriakov	
2001	Halfway to Paris	Prokhor Murashov	
2003	Bajazet	Hrenov	TV series
2005	Two fates	Fomich	TV series
2005	Trotter	Grishin	
2005	Satisfaction	Stepan	Mini-Series
2008	Apostol	Commissioner Vladimir Demin	TV series
2009	True Noon	Kirill	Tajik Film
2009	The Brothers Karamazov	Police Chief Mikhail Makarovich	TV series
2011	Notes forwarder Secret Chancellery	Yakov Petrovich	film series
2012	Snipers: Love under the Crosshairs	Georgy 'Uncle Gosha' Denisov	TV series
2013	Stalingrad	Gunner	
2016	Sophia	Macarius	TV series
2021	Murderous Fervour	Ipatyev's father	TV series
