= Bushkill Park =

Small amusement park in Pennsylvania

- Logo

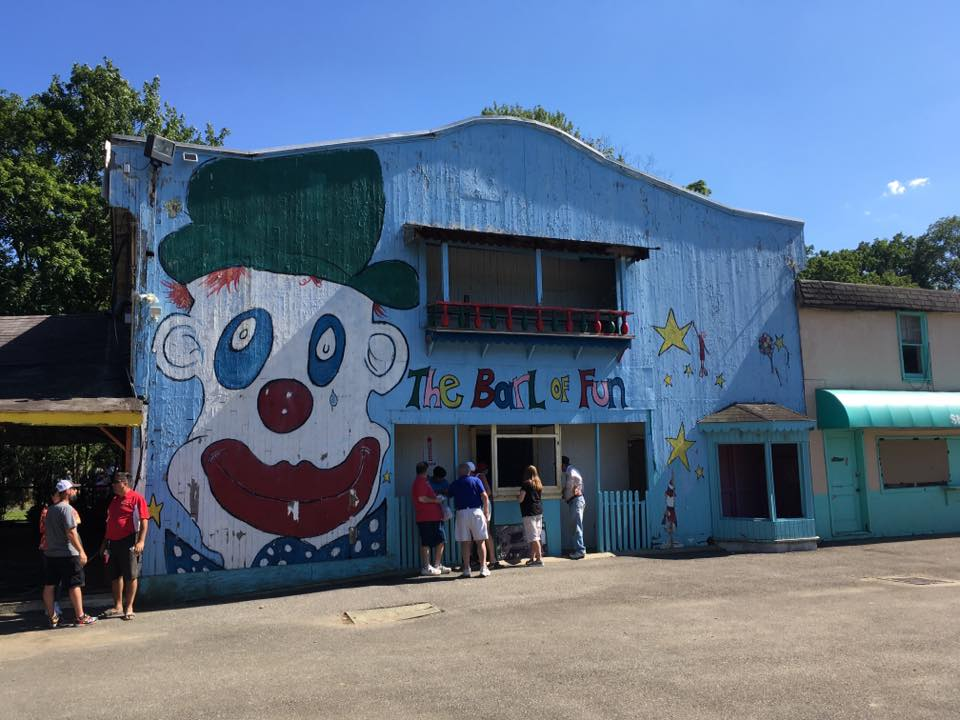
- The Bar'l of Fun funhouse during Bushkill Park's 115th anniversary in 2017
- Interactive map of Bushkill Park
- Location: 2100 Bushkill Park Drive, Easton, Pennsylvania, U.S.
- Coordinates: 40.702°N 75.251°W
- Opened: July 3, 1902; 124 years ago
- Operating season: Year-Round for skating rink; starting in 2018, Summer for rides
- Area: 13 acres (0.053 km^{2})

Attractions
- Total: 7 (as of 2019)
- Website: Official website

Bushkill Park, formerly Bushkill Park and Grove, is an amusement park in Easton, Pennsylvania. One of the oldest amusement parks in the nation, it is today geared toward younger audiences. The facility operated continuously from 1902 to 2004 and during the summer of 2006. It has operated since January 2017.

== History and features ==
=== Carousels ===
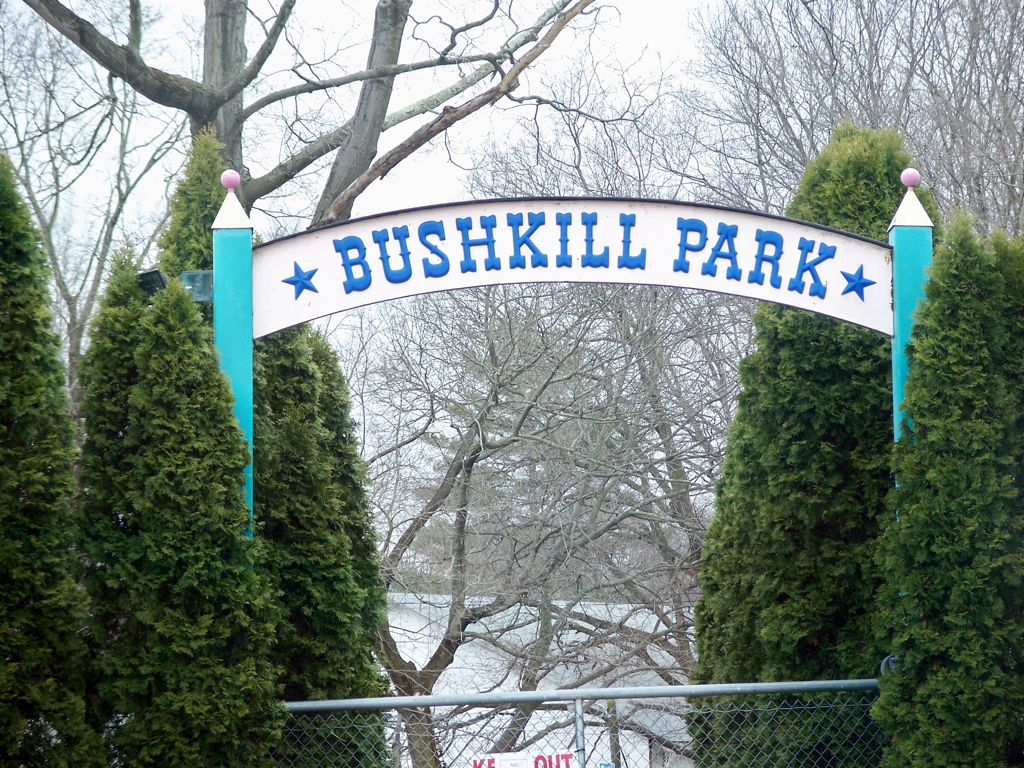
Bushkill Park's entrance in March 2008

Bushkill Park has owned and operated two notable vintage carousels. The first was a three row menagerie built by Tom Long’s father and uncle in 1902. Known as Long Carousel #8 in a series of family-built models, it was initially based at a park on an island near Philadelphia and was brought to Island Park via canal boat in 1912. It traveled to a few parks managed by Long before settling in at Bushkill Park in the mid 1930s. It remained at Bushkill until Mabel Long’s death in 1989, when the park and carousel were sold separately. Long #8’s last known location was intact in an Ohio warehouse.

In March 1993, the park purchased a 1915 carousel made by the Allan Herschell Company from the dilapidated Willow Mill Park in Mechanicsburg, Pennsylvania, which opened with the amusement park in 1934 and stopped operating in 1990 when it closed. Along with the carousel, a Wurlitzer band organ that once played at Willow Mill Park was also purchased. Between 2001 and 2007, the carousel was sold, and in the winter of 2014 the carousel building collapsed from a heavy snow load.

An additional 1907-vintage carousel made by the Dentzel Carousel Company was refurbished by Tom Long and likely his brother, George Long, Sr.. While it never physically turned as a Bushkill Park feature, it was repaired piece by piece in Tom Long’s workshop at the rear of the park. In 1966, it was sold to Centreville Amusement Park in Toronto, Ontario.

In 1933, Thomas Long (1885–1965) leased Bushkill Park, furnishing it with a hand carved carousel that he and his father had purchased. In 1939, Long bought the park and operated it for the rest of his life along with his wife, Mabel "Mom" Long.

After Long's death, Mabel operated the park with Melvin Heavener until he died in 1986, and then operated it alone until her death in 1989.

The first owner after 1989 was William Hogan and his partner, Neal Fehnel.

=== The Bar'l of Fun ===
The Bar'l of Fun was one of the oldest operating funhouses in the United States, built sometime before 1935. The funhouse notable for its history and the amount of untouched folk art painted on the walls and on banners inside it.

The rotating barrel from which the attraction gets its name is located inside the funhouse. Also inside the building is a maze-like layout in a dark room with mirrors. In the past, there was a flashing strobe light in the corner of the room. Beyond the maze is the famous barrel, a multi-person "sit-and-spin" style ride and a wobbly staircase. Upstairs is the Hall of Mirrors, and a rolling walkway that looks out onto the park. The funhouse includes an original antique wooden slide that goes from the second floor to the first. In 1997, the funhouse was featured on Discovery Channel.

=== Flooding and vandalism ===
The park has long existed in a flood zone, nearly surrounded by the Bushkill Creek. In 2004, Hurricane Ivan caused a "100-year flood" that destroyed the Haunted Pretzel and a miniature golf course, and damaged the bumper cars and the "Whip" ride. The park, which did not open in 2005, was flooded again in April 2005 and June 2006.

In 2007, vandalism "left the park in shambles".

In June 2010, Baurkot reported that they had hired crews to begin cleaning up the park. No opening date was projected, and progress was slower than anticipated as the partners waited for additional funds to pay workers.

In the summer of 2010, the park was visited by Mike Wolfe and Frank Fritz of Antique Archaeology. This visit was featured on their reality TV show, American Pickers, in the third-season premiere episode, "A Banner Pick", which premiered December 6, 2010. A pair of vintage sideshow banners, one by Fred G. Johnson, were bought from the park for US$700, and auctioned for US$10,000. Wolfe and Fritz gave the park's owners $5,000 of their unexpectedly large profit because they were impressed with the attempts to revive the park.

In January 2017, the park reopened its skating rink, the indoor arcade, and children's party area for Friday and Saturday nights, Sunday afternoons, and Tuesday nights. Rentals for birthday parties and picnics were also available.

=== 115th anniversary celebration ===
On July 9, 2017, the park was opened to visitors for its 115th birthday as a fundraiser. Guests were treated to inflatable rides, face painting, fried food, and ticket giveaways for nearby amusement parks. The Bar'l of Fun was also opened for the day. Guests were able to walk around the park, and explore the newly restored clown ride and swan ride, which are both small swing rides for children. A new mascot for the park was shown at the event, Do*more the duck.

The owners revealed their plans to reopen the park with seven or eight rides and the funhouse for the 2018 season. Most of the 17 pre-flood rides had been destroyed or sold.

The entrance sign and the front of the skating rink were repainted for the occasion. The skating rink received a blue and white pattern with red letters displaying "Skating Rink" painted over top. A restored car from the Whip ride, along with other unrestored cars from previous rides such as the bumper cars and The Haunted Pretzel, were on display for guests to sit in and take pictures in. Silk-screened glass blocks from the collapsed carousel building were for sale for $100 as souvenirs, along with branded T-shirts and mugs. Proceeds from the fundraiser were to benefit the park, and nearly three thousand people attended.

In May 2019, Fehnel sold his share to co-owner Sammy Baurkot.

=== Reopening ===
In 2022, the park reopened. It celebrated its 120th anniversary on July 4. The Bar'l Of Fun Funhouse, now known as Hilarity Hall, has also been restored and reopened.

== In popular culture ==
- In 2011, after the park had been ravaged by flooding, it was featured in The Fields, a horror film starring Cloris Leachman and Tara Reid.
- On December 6, 2010, on Season 3, Episode 1 of American Pickers on the History Channel, pickers Mike Wolfe and Frank Fritz visit Bushkill Park, where they purchase two fairly sideshow banners. Appraiser William Leroy later identifies one as being by Fred G. Johnson. Leroy values the pair at $10,000.
- In 1999, the Bar'l of Fun was featured on the Discovery Channel.
