= Harford Fair =

Fair in Pennsylvania, United States

The Harford Fair is a fair held in Harford Township north of Scranton in Susquehanna County, Pennsylvania. It is a traditional country fair that features amusement rides (including a Ferris wheel). It also includes livestock judging, chainsaw races, tractor pulls, draft horse and other animal shows. It also includes two selected annual events, such as monster trucks.

== General information ==
The fair takes place during the third full week in August every year. Anyone may purchase a plot to exhibit land or apply to get a plot for a tent to stay on the Fair grounds during the week. The Fair grounds are not used exclusively for the Fair and are maintained for spring, fall and summer. Other events that take place on the grounds are car shows, horse competitions, 4-H events, meetings and in 2007 there was a second demolition derby in addition to the one usually held during the fair.

== Attendance ==
The fair is typically well attended, although like most fairs, weather plays a factor. In 2004 the number of people to attend the fair was 65,173, and in 2005 75,176. These numbers are good relative to the population of the township (1,301), but they are lower than the Allentown Fair, Ephrata Fair, Crawford County Fair, and Bloomsburg Fair.

== Fair beginnings ==
The first Fair was to be held on the grounds near the Congregational meeting house on Nov. 4, 1858. The weather was unfavorable and an adjournment was made until Nov. 9, when there was an exhibition of stock, vegetables, etc.

The second fair was held on October 13, 1859, and included a plowing match.

In 1860, the Harford Agricultural Society procured and fenced the ground of N. W. Waldron for the fair to be held. The location of the fair was moved to this land and buildings were erected with funds from subscriptions from towns people. The two buildings built during this year were one for the Ladies' Department and a long shed with a double roof with a secretary's office. This fair was the first year that admission was charged. At the annual meeting in 1863, it was decided to pay an officer for services for the first time and the recipient was the secretary, who received a salary of $5 a year.

There was no fair in 1917–18, 1942–45 & 2020.

== The 150th Fair ==
The 150th Fair took place during August 20–25, 2007. A parade was held and a large cake was created and served to commemorate the event. At the first Harford Fair, the parade consisted of 50 yoke of oxen pulling the Fair officials through the town of Harford in wagons.

=== The officers for the 150th Harford Fair ===
- President: Jeffrey Page
- 1st Vice President: Rich Carpenetti
- 2nd Vice President: Mark Pease
- Treasurer: Dale Grant
- Secretary: Denise Hubbard
- Assistant Secretary: Sue Pease
- Security: Ray Bolcavage
- Traffic: Chuck Latwinski and Brandon Bennett
- Commercial Space: Nancy Tyler
- Ticket Sales: Dorothy States
- The Directors: James K. Adams, William Beeman, Gene Hubbard, Hendrick Marr, Cindy Reynolds, Francis Supancik, David Tyler, and William Tyler.

The contests for 2007 were the 150th competitive games, queen contest, tractor pull (farm and antique), flower beautification, tractor-mods & trucks, baby show, kiddy tractor pull, animal costume ball, woodsmen's contest, horse pulling, turkey calling, garden tractor pull and a demolition derby.

The judging and contests for 2007 were school and group, art work, rabbits, 4-H (rabbits, projects, swine, beef, goats, and sheep), poultry and pigeons, draft horses, horses-halter, goats, colored breeds (youth and open), swine, beef show, horse barrel, horse exhibitor, sheep, Holstein (youth and open dairy show), and the open horse show.
