= How Dark the Nights Are on the Black Sea =

1989 film

- Original French film poster
- Directed by: Vasili Pichul
- Written by: Mariya Khmelik
- Produced by: Mark Levin
- Starring: Aleksei Zharkov; Natalya Negoda; Anastasiya Vertinskaya; Alexander Lenkov
- Cinematography: Yefim Reznikov
- Edited by: Yelena Zabolotskaya
- Release date: 1989
- Running time: 115 minutes
- Country: Soviet Union
- Language: Russian

How Dark the Nights Are on the Black Sea (Russian: В городе Сочи тёмные ночи, romanized: V gorode Sochi tyomnye nochi, lit. 'In the city of Sochi, the nights are dark') is a 1989 Soviet romantic comedy film directed by Vasili Pichul. It was screened in the Un Certain Regard section at the 1990 Cannes Film Festival.

== Plot ==
The story takes place across various cities, including Moscow, a northern provincial town, and Sochi. The characters are ordinary people—doctors, performers, vendors, and laborers—facing the aftermath of the Perestroika era. The main protagonists are Lena, a 24-year-old former student (played by Natalia Negoda), who was abandoned by her lover and is trying to rebuild her life, and Stepanich, a 45-year-old plumber (played by Alexei Zharkov), who is a seasoned con artist skilled at gaining people’s trust and disappearing with large sums of money.

The narrative also includes their acquaintances, colleagues, and family members, whose paths continuously intersect.

== Cast ==
- Aleksei Zharkov as Stepanych, seasoned conman
- Natalya Negoda as Lena
- Anastasiya Vertinskaya as Lena's mother
- Alexander Lenkov as Lena's father
- Anna Tikhonova as Jeanne, shopgirl
- Grigori Manukov as Oleg Strelnikov
- Aleksandr Negreba as head of theatre
- Aleksandr Mironov as policeman
- Vatslav Dvorzhetsky as Fedor Fedorovich Strelnikov
- Andrei Sokolov as Boris, Stepanych's son
- Igor Zolotovitsky as Gubanischev
- Levan Mskhiladze as Sasha, Lena's former groom
- Maria Yevstigneyeva as Marina, Lena's former friend
- Yuri Nazarov as Glazier, criminal
- Boris Smorchkov as Jeanne's father
- Inna Ulyanova as lady in the restaurant
- Yervant Arzumanyan as Ashot Aramovich, theatre director
- Alexandra Tabakova as Masha
- Andrey Fomin as playwright
- Nadezhda Markina as Sonya, Oleg Strelnikov's wife
