= Lithuanian Days =

Annual event

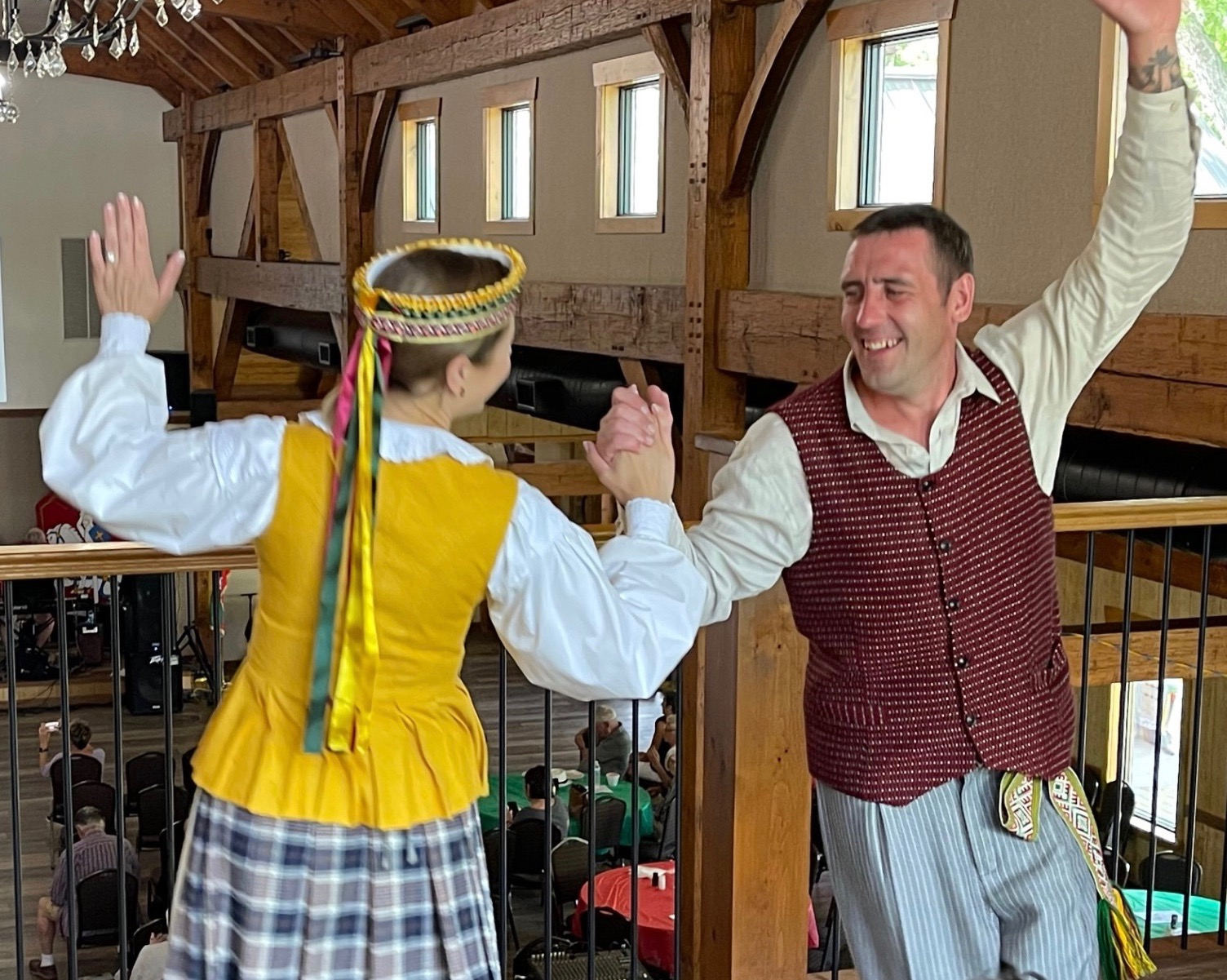
Malūnas Dance Group, Lithuanian Days- Catalpa Grove, Lakewood Park, August 13, 2022

Lithuanian Day- Lakewood Park, August 15, 1926

The Lithuanian Days is the oldest annually consecutive ethnic festival in the United States. In 1914, it was established as “Lithuanian Day” in Schuylkill County, Pennsylvania, by the Lithuanian Catholic Priests League. Its purpose was to bring together Lithuanian immigrants and their families for a day of culture, fun, and fellowship.

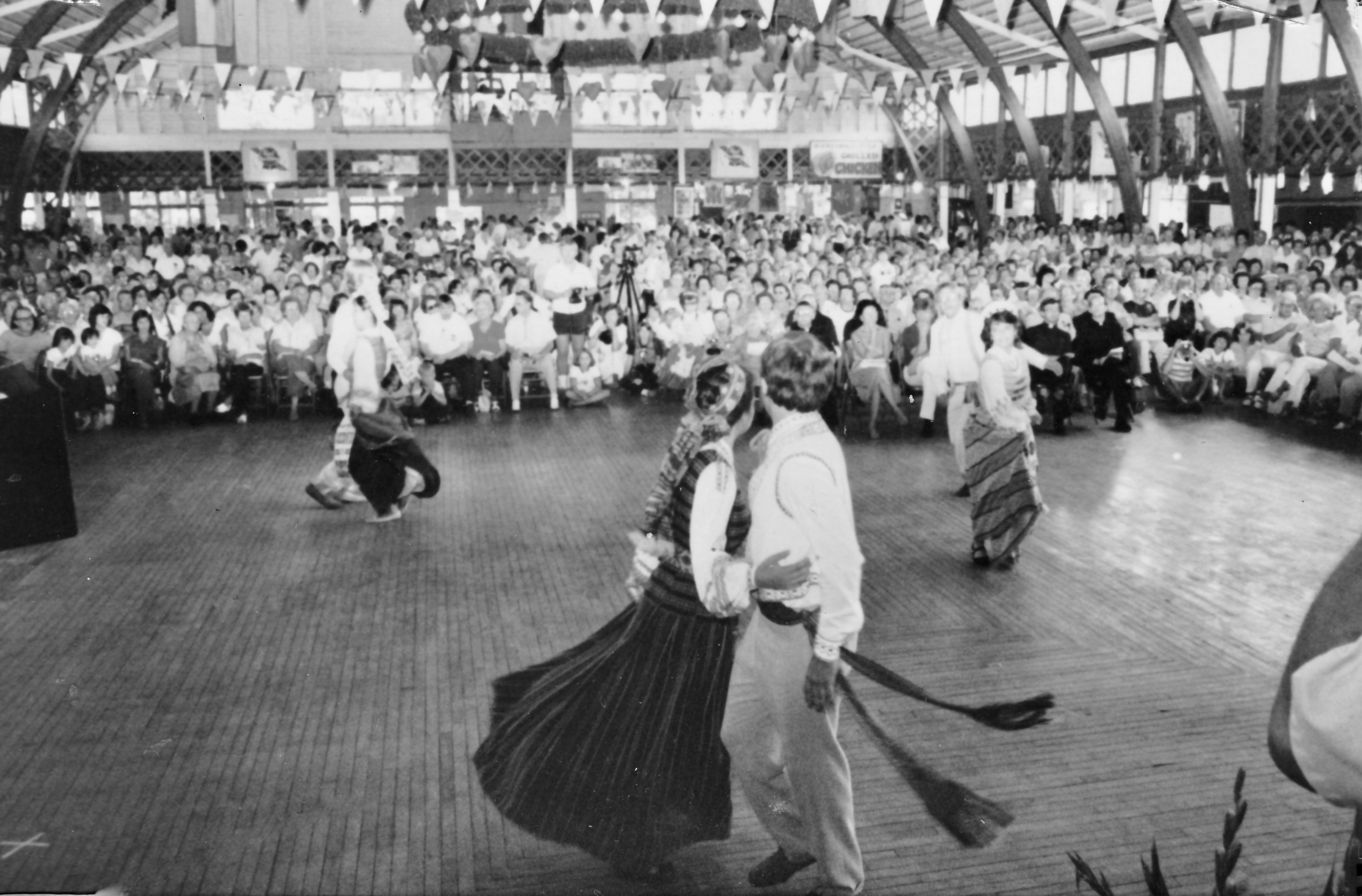
Lithuanian Day- Lakewood Park, August 15, 1982

Although the location has alternated among different sites in northeast Pennsylvania, the Lithuanian Days are still held in Schuylkill County, on the weekend closest to August 15.

== Background ==
The first massive wave of Lithuanian emigration occurred between 1865 and 1915, when approximately 20 to 30% of Lithuanians fled their homeland, which was then under the rule of the Russian Czar. Partly because neither the processing stations of Castle Garden nor Ellis Island recognized Lithuania as a separate ethnic group or country, immigrants were reported as Russians, Poles, or Germans. It was not until 1924 that the US Census Bureau accepted Lithuania’s independence through the Act of February 16, 1918 and allowed immigrants from that country to be classified as Lithuanians.

One of the significant destinations for the first wave of these immigrants was the Pennsylvania coal region, which became home to more than 100,000 Lithuanian-Americans. The majority spoke Lithuanian, were Catholics, and had distinct traditions. Often when Lithuanians emigrated to the United States, the first job they were able to secure was as mine laborers, which was dangerous, demanded long hours and offered little pay. For generations, it was not their jobs, but rather their parish that became the center of the Lithuanian Catholic community. It not only provided spiritual guidance, but also with dances and cultural events, churches offered a strong social and cultural setting.

== History ==
Lithuanian Day- Lakeside Park, August 15, 1922

In 1914, before Lithuania was recognized by the Government of the United States, the Lithuanian Catholic Priests League proposed an event to bring together Lithuanian immigrants and their families and determined that Lakewood and Lakeside parks would be ideal locations. Two priests in the league, Rev. Father Vincent Dargis and Rev. Dr. Father Francis Augustaitis, helped establish the first Lithuanian Day as a celebration for the Lithuanian community, to "observe our ancient and honored customs."

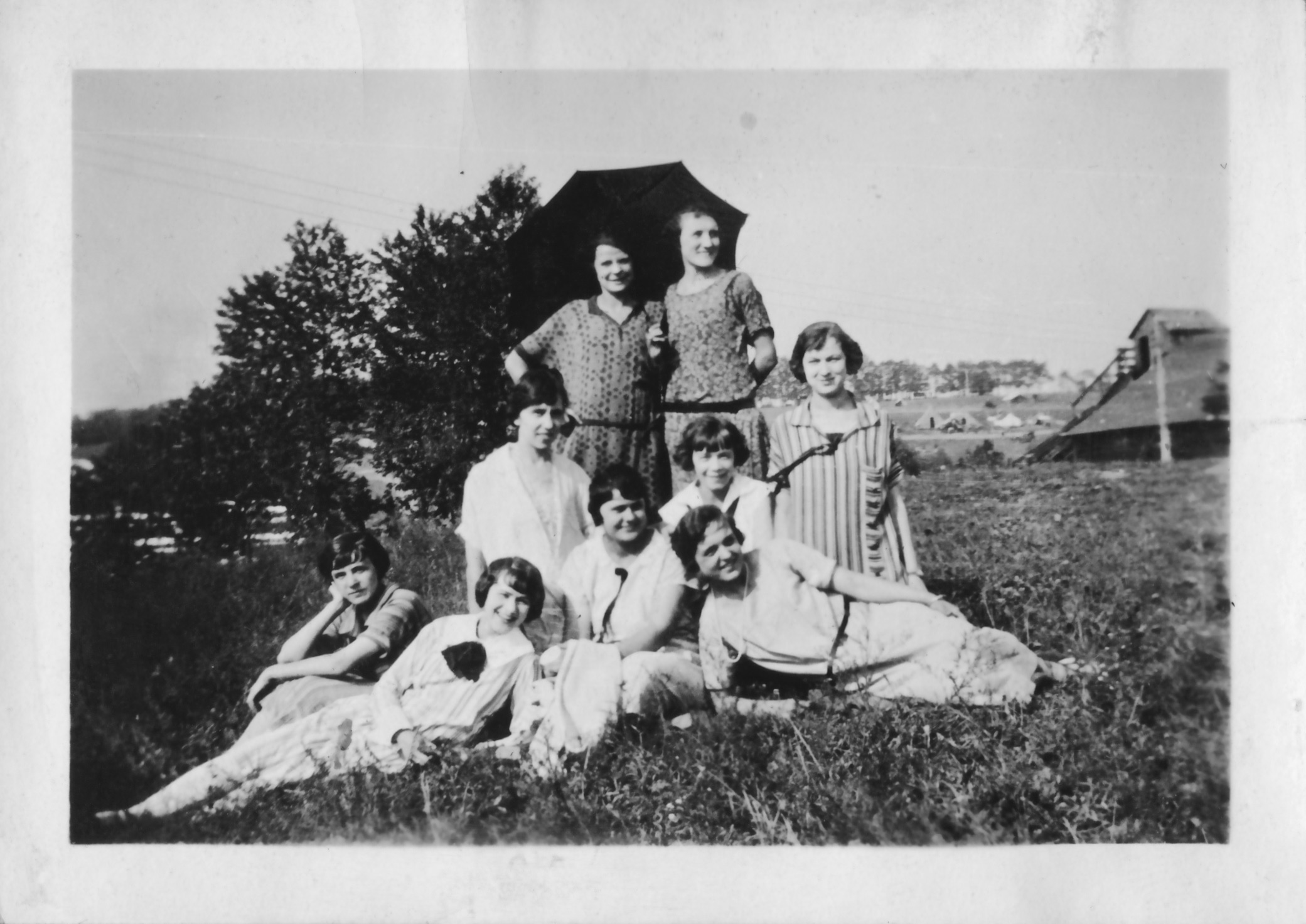
Lithuanian Day- Lakewood Park, August 15

Because most Lithuanian men in the area were laborers in anthracite coal mines, the date chosen for the festival was August 15, the Feast of the Assumption of the Blessed Virgin Mary, a Holy Day of Obligation. Since almost all immigrants who worked in the local mines were Catholic and would go to church to attend Mass, mine owners allowed collieries to close for the day. Traditionally, the celebration of Lithuanian Day would begin with the Holy Mass, then continue throughout the day with programs and speeches, as well as dancing and singing, eating and drinking. At first, the day was little more than a picnic with families and friends, accompanied by traditional foods such as šaltibarščiai, kugelis, balandėliai and bundukies, with violins and accordions playing the music from the old country.

Lithuanian Day- Lakewood Park, August 15

Over the decades, the celebration evolved, adapting and modifying according to the location and the generation of Lithuanian-Americans who were attending. Begun as a gathering for the first wave of immigrants, through the decades of Czarist, German, Polish, Nazi, and Soviet occupation of Lithuania, it became part celebration, part protest, part fundraiser for Lithuanian charities. As members of the Lithuanian Catholic Priest League began to retire, in 1977 the Knights of Lithuania Anthracite Council took responsibility for running the festival. From 1914 until 1957, the event was held on August 15, the Solemnity of the Assumption; by 1958, when few men continued to work in the coal mines, it was held on the Sunday closest to August 15.

During its first years at the beginning of the 20th century, Lithuanian Day was held at both Lakeside Park as well as less than a mile away at Lakewood Park in Barnesville, Pennsylvania. At that time many attendees would ride the train, arriving at the Lakeside station. Specific express passenger trains from Philadelphia and New York were added to the line just for the day; on that day 13 trains would deliver festival goers to Lakewood.

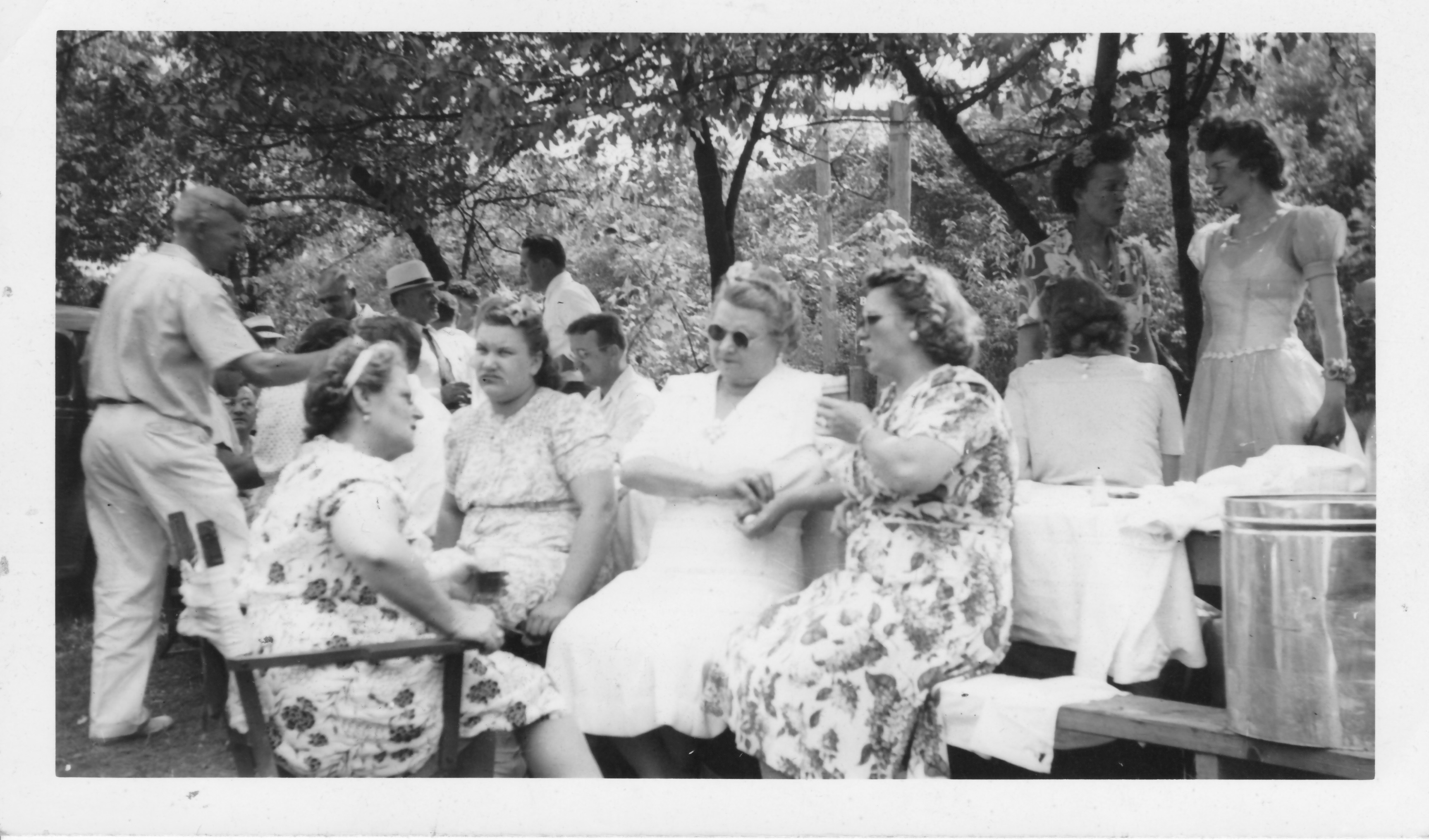
Lithuanian Day- Lakewood Park, August 15, 1942

From 1922 to 1984, Lakewood Park became the unofficial home of the festival. For decades, as many as 20,000 to 30,000 people attended each year. Due to the sizable attendance, local news included reports of families sending someone to the park the night before to sleep on a table, thereby claiming it for the next day; buying a block of ice from the ice house and transporting it miles in the heat of August; preparing food for days in advance to share the feast.

Lithuanian Day- Lakewood Park, August 15, 1982

When Lakewood Park closed, the event was held for two years at Rocky Glen Park in Moosic, Pennsylvania, before moving to Fairlane Village Mall, St. Clair where the festival became a two-day event, and then to the Schuylkill Mall, both in Schuylkill County. From 2016 to 2019 the festivities were held in a Lithuanian Roman Catholic Church Hall, Assumption BVM in Frackville, Pennsylvania. Due to Covid-19 restrictions, in 2020 Lithuanian Days became a virtual celebration, held on private property and broadcast via Facebook.

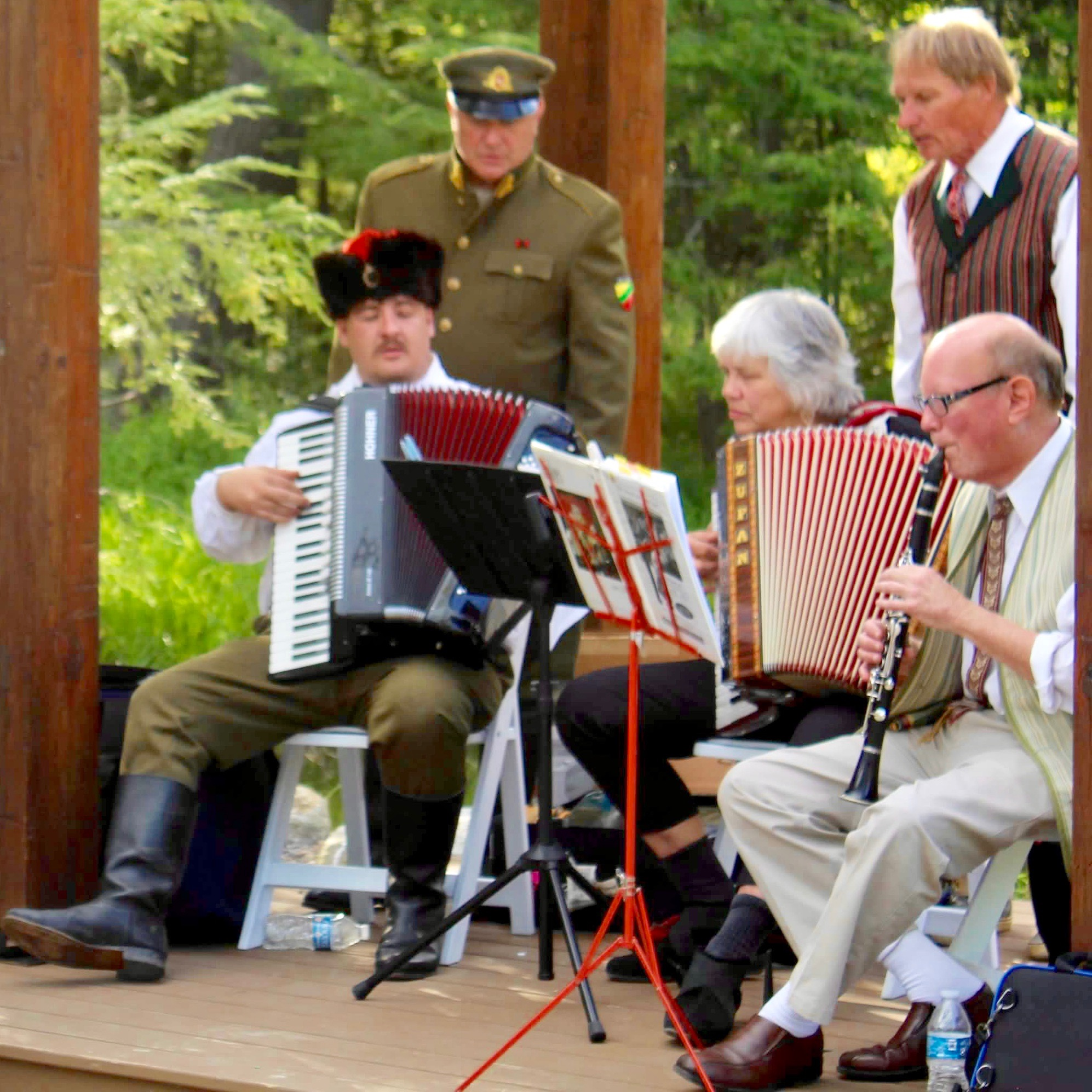
Lithuanian Days- Catalpa Grove Lakewood Park, August 14, 2022

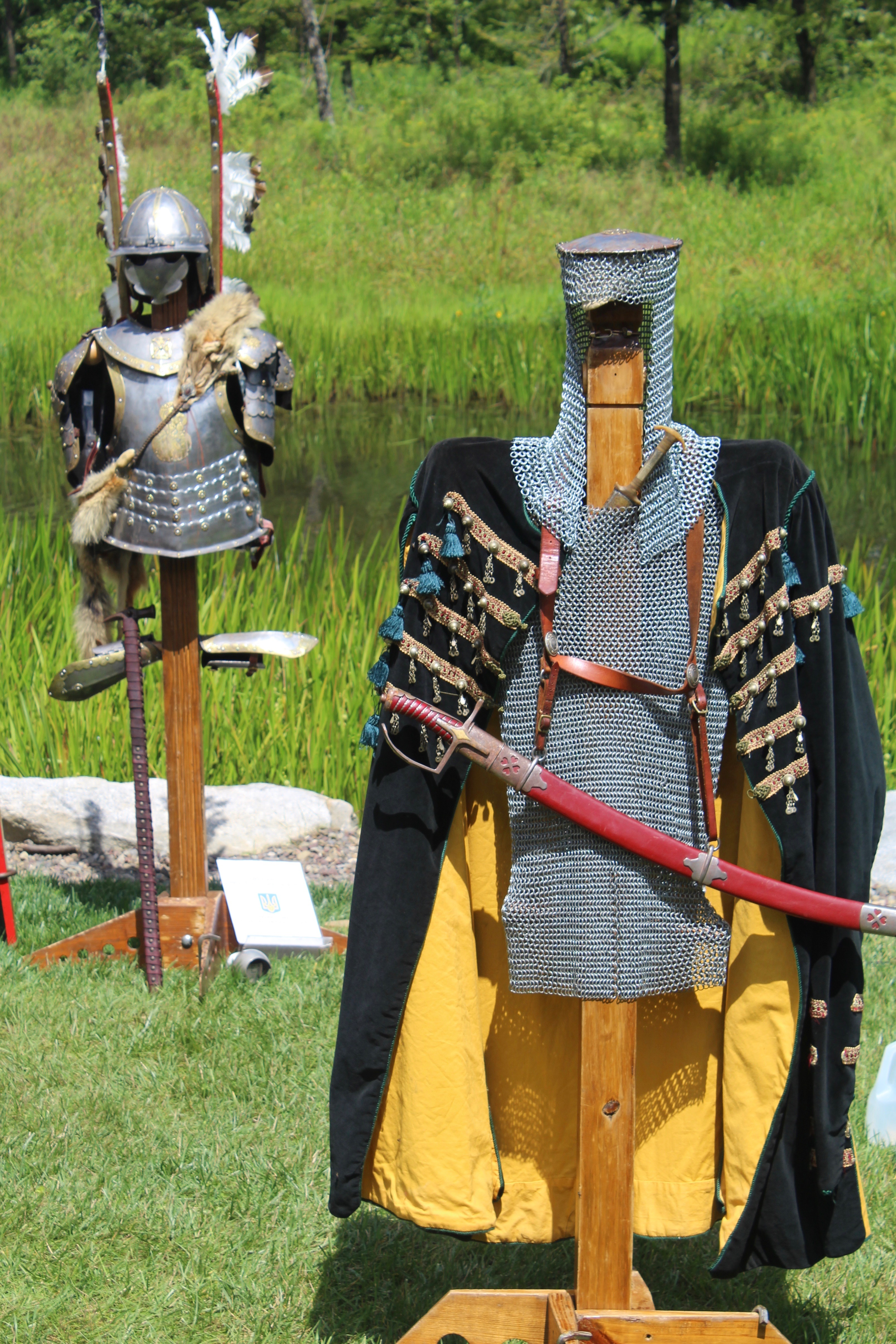
Banner of Jasna Gora, Lithuanian Days- Lakewood Park, August 14, 2022

After over 35 years of different locations, in 2021 Lithuanian Days returned to Lakewood Park, in Catalpa Grove where the legacy event continues. The program still features Lithuanian dancers in traditional costumes, as well as Lithuanian foods; however, it also includes a Partisan camp set during the Soviet era to highlight Lithuanians’ fight for freedom, and the tent of the Banners of Jasna Gora, to delve into Lithuanian Medieval history.

== Notable guests ==
During Lithuanian Day programs, distinguished guests have attended and been honored for their contributions to Lithuanian culture, including Antanas Smetona, the first President of Lithuania; General Jonas Černius of the Lithuanian Armed Forces; Lithuanian Ambassadors to the United States: Žygimantas Pavilionis and Audra Plepytė; Bishops Vincentas Brizgys and Pranciškus Būčys; Algimantas Bartkus, Rector of the Pontifical Lithuanian College in Rome; Ruta Lee, actress and philanthropist; Nida Grigalavičiūtė, operatic and recording artist; Simas Kudirka, activist and author.

== Charitable donations ==
Profits from the Lithuanian Day have been donated to many charitable causes, including War Relief Fund, Infant Jesus Orphanage, Lithuanian Orphans and Students’ Fund, Ateitis Federation, Displaced Persons of Lithuania, Defense of Lithuania, Lithuanian Catholic Religious Aid, Sisters of St. Casimir, and Pontifical Lithuanian College in Rome.
