= Rootz: The Green City Music Festival =

Folk music festival in Pennsylvania, US

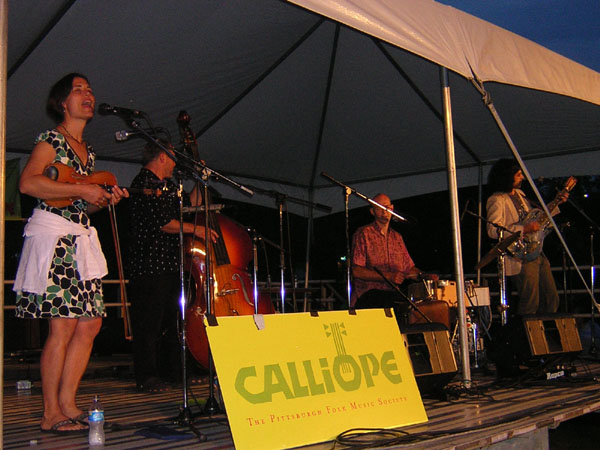
- Rani Arbo and Daisy Mayhem performing at the first annual Green City Music Festival on July 12, 2008.
- Genre: Folk and others
- Dates: July
- Locations: Pittsburgh, Pennsylvania
- Years active: 2008–2019, 2021–present
- Founders: Calliope: Pittsburgh Folk Music Society
- Website: Official Calliope Website

Rootz: The Green City Music Festival is a folk music festival sponsored by Calliope: Pittsburgh Folk Music Society in Pittsburgh, Pennsylvania. The first annual Green City Music Festival was held in Mellon Park near Shadyside on Saturday, July 12, 2008, and featured performances by Rani Arbo and Daisy Mayhem, Steve Forbert, Ernie Hawkins and his band, and many other performances by various local and regional musicians.

In 1977, Calliope held its first outdoor music festival, The Smoky City Folk Festival. The SCFF was held for the next 23 years and created the opportunity for local artists to perform in front of thousands of people. The 2008 Green City Music Festival was an updated version of the Smoky City Folk Festival. The name change reflects the city of Pittsburgh's efforts to clean itself up over the years and shed its smoky past while still celebrating the people who helped make it what it is today.

2020 saw no festival caused by the COVID-19 pandemic; the 13th was deferred to 2021.
