= Harford Township, Susquehanna County, Pennsylvania =

Township in Pennsylvania, United States

Harford Township, Pennsylvania
- Township
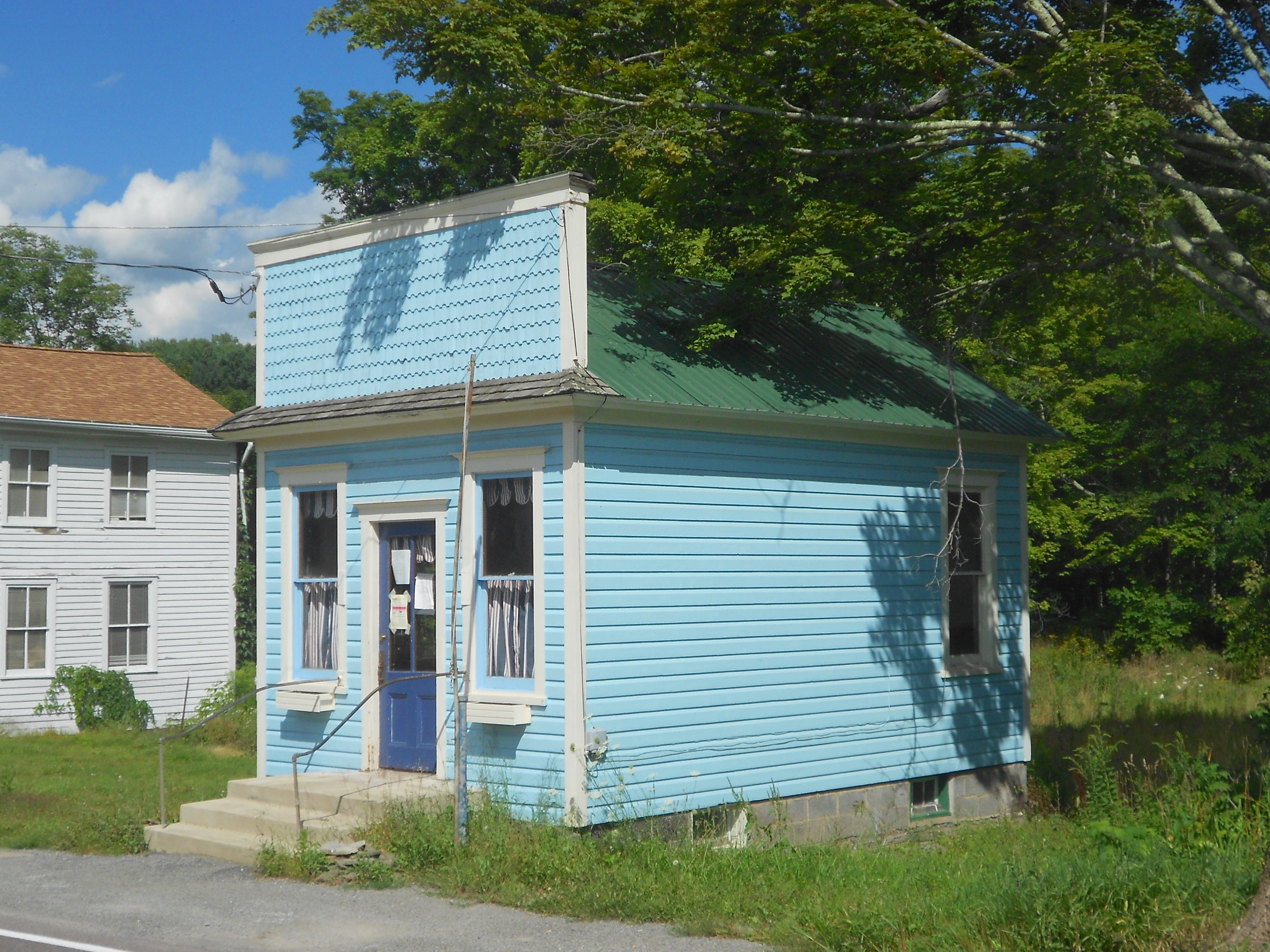

- Location of Pennsylvania in the United States
- Coordinates: 41°44′00″N 75°41′59″W
- Country: United States
- State: Pennsylvania
- County: Susquehanna
- Settled: 1790
- Incorporated: 1808

Area
  - Total: 33.27 sq mi (86.16 km^{2})
  - Land: 32.88 sq mi (85.16 km^{2})
  - Water: 0.39 sq mi (1.00 km^{2})

Population (2020)
  - Total: 1,255 ▼
  - Estimate (2021): 1,255
  - Density: 41.0/sq mi (15.83/km^{2})
- Time zone: UTC-5 (EST)
  - Summer (DST): UTC-4 (EDT)
- ZIP Code: 18823
- Area code: 570
- FIPS code: 42-115-32568
- Website: harfordtwp.org/index.htm

Harford Township is a township in Susquehanna County, Pennsylvania, United States. The population was 1,255 at the 2020 census.

== Geography ==
According to the United States Census Bureau, the township has a total area of 33.3 square miles (86 km^{2}), of which 32.9 square miles (85 km^{2}) is land and 0.4 square miles (1.0 km^{2}) (1.23%) is water.

== History ==
In 1808, Harford Township was formed from the northern part of Nicholson Township in what was then Luzerne County.

The offices of the Harford Historical Society are located in Harford, in a building that was used by the Harford Soldiers' Orphan School from 1865 to 1902 to house and school destitute children of Civil War veterans. The Orphan School was built on the campus of the former Franklin Academy (from 1836), later Harford University, which had been founded in 1817.

The village of Kingsley, within Harford Township, was named after original settler and Revolutionary War veteran Rufus Kingsley.

In 1865, residents in the village of Harford (within Harford Township) circulated a petition to formally incorporate their village as a borough, but the petition was denied by the state.

== Demographics ==
Historical population
Census	Pop.	Note	%±
2010	1,430		—
2020	1,255		−12.2%
2021 (est.)	1,255		0.0%
U.S. Decennial Census

As of the census of 2010, there were 1,430 people, 597 households, and 412 families residing in the township. The population density was 43.5 inhabitants per square mile (16.8/km^{2}). There were 767 housing units at an average density of 23.3/sq mi (9.1/km^{2}). The racial makeup of the township was 98.8% White, 0.05% Native American, 0.05% Asian, 0.5% from other races, and 0.6% from two or more races. Hispanic or Latino of any race were 0.4% of the population.

There were 597 households, out of which 27.5% had children under the age of 18 living with them, 58% were married couples living together, 6% had a female householder with no husband present, and 31% were non-families. 26.5% of all households were made up of individuals, and 12.2% had someone living alone who was 65 years of age or older. The average household size was 2.40 and the average family size was 2.88.

In the township the population was spread out, with 21.3% under the age of 18, 59.3% from 18 to 64, and 19.4% who were 65 years of age or older. The median age was 46 years.

The median income for a household in the township was $53,600, and the median income for a family was $60,313. Males had a median income of $45,673 versus $26,515 for females. The per capita income for the township was $26,006. About 3% of families and 4.8% of the population were below the poverty line, including none of those under age 18 and 12.8% of those age 65 or over.

== Notable people ==
- Bronson Pinchot, actor, known for his work on Perfect Strangers. Though not a born resident, the veteran character actor has re-developed several properties in the township.
- Farris B. Streeter, Pennsylvania State Senator for the 10th district from 1847 to 1850. Solicitor of the United States Treasury from 1853 to 1858
- William Seymour Tyler, historian of Amherst College, Massachusetts, and professor of Greek and Latin.

== Gallery ==
Houses in Harford

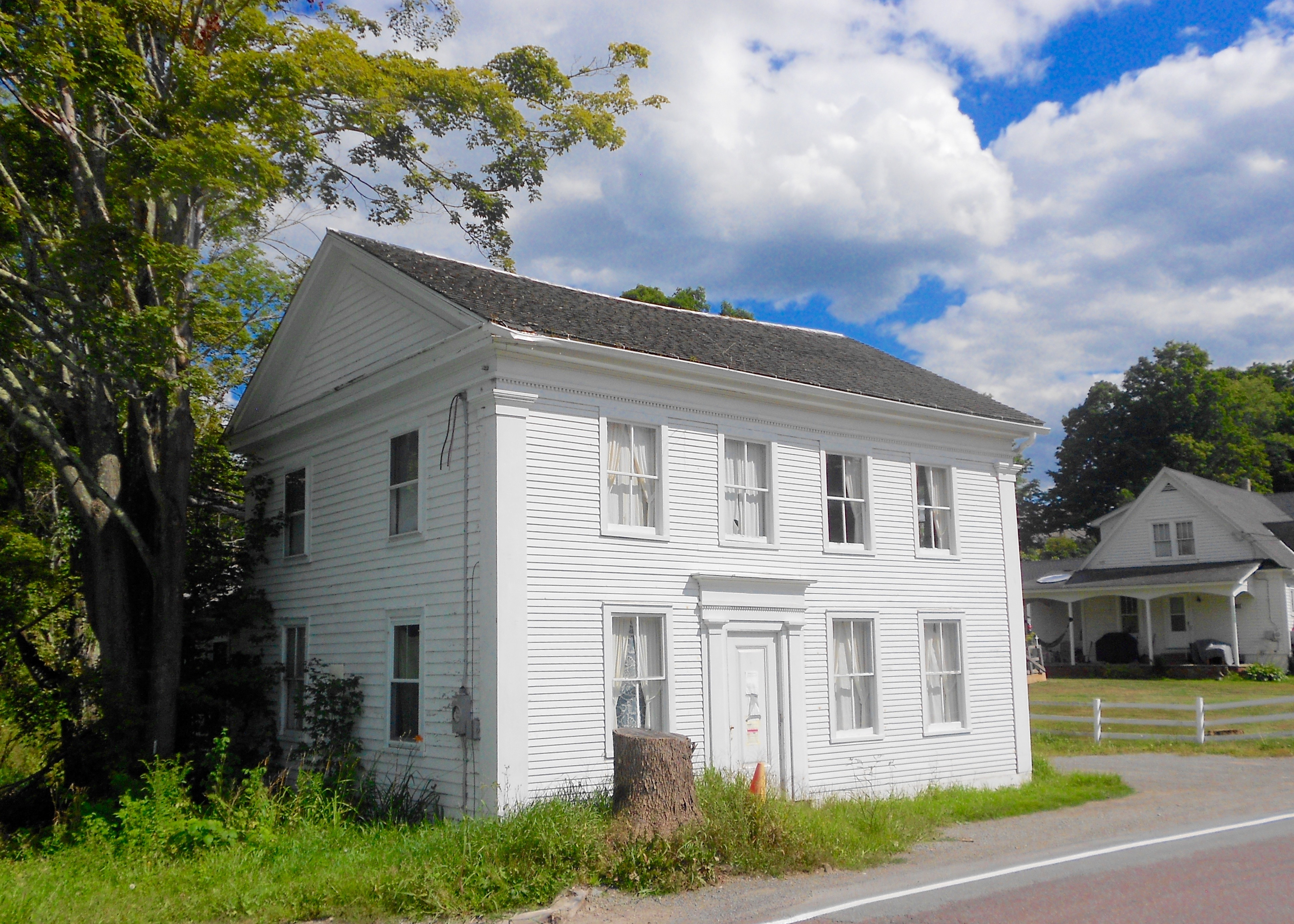

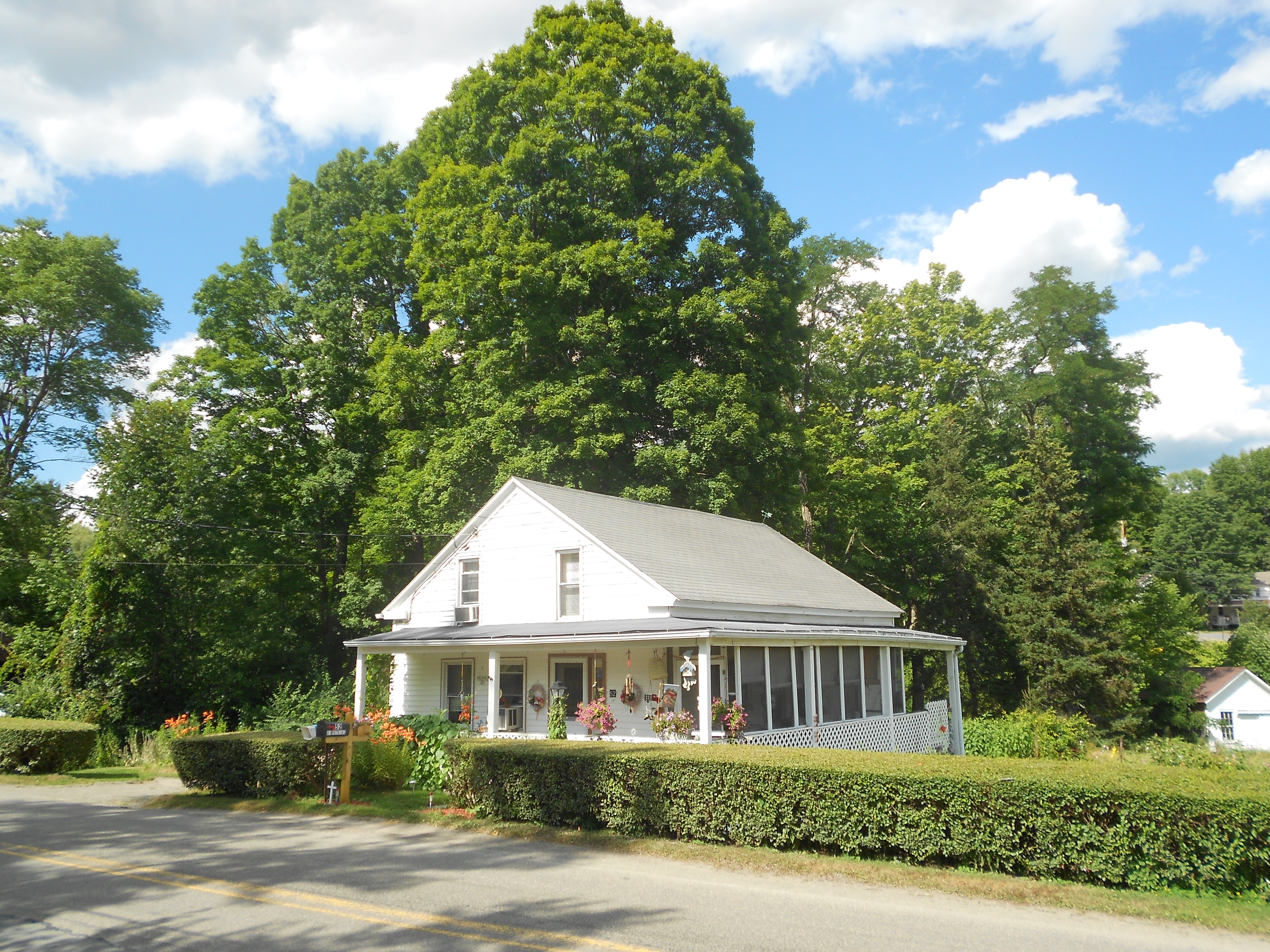

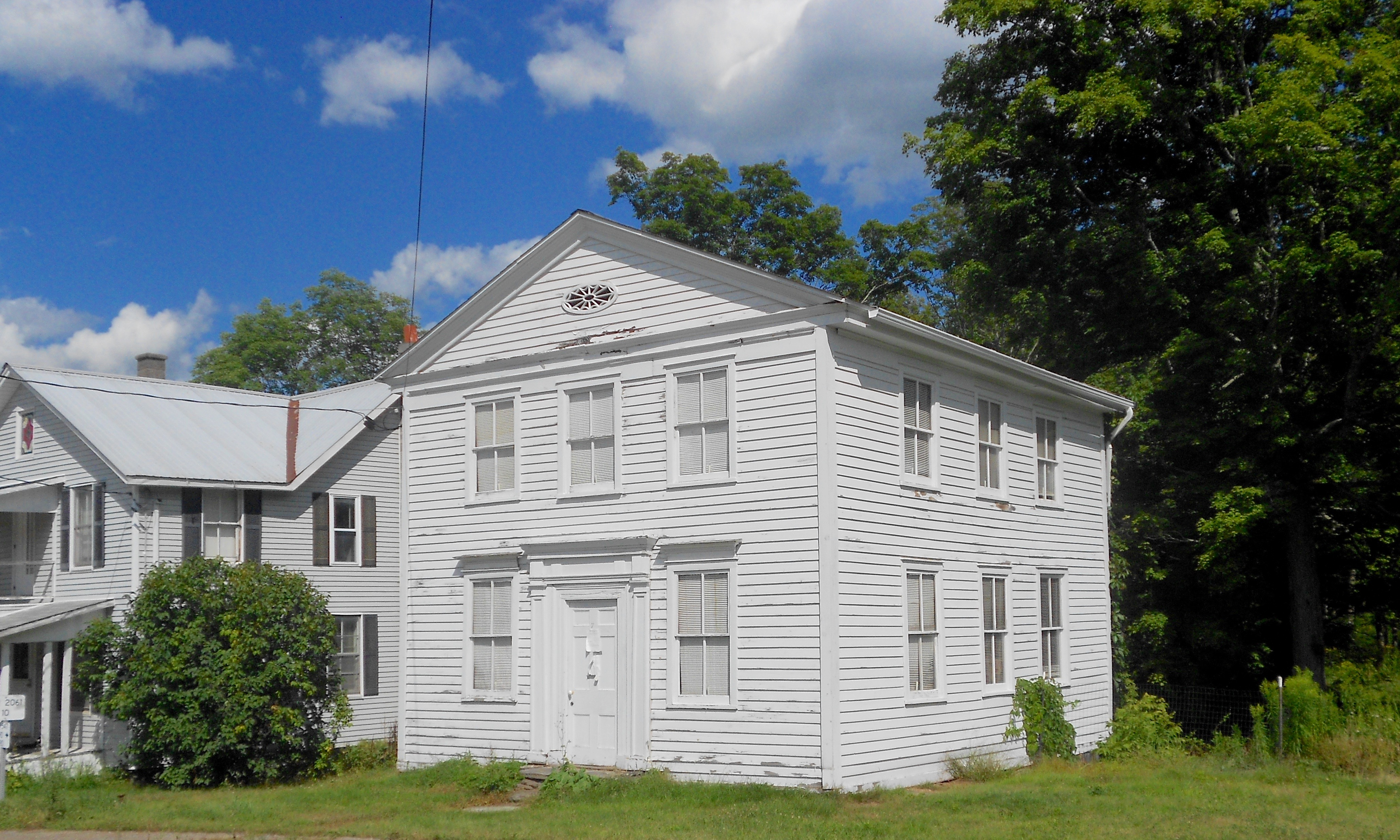

== See also ==
- Harford Fair
