= Vasili Pichul =

- Born: 15 June 1961; Zhdanov, Ukrainian SSR, Soviet Union
- Died: 26 July 2015 (aged 54); Moscow, Russia
- Occupations: Film director Screenwriter
- Years active: 1985-2015
- Notable work: Little Vera (1988)

Vasili Vladimirovich Pichul (Russian: Васи́лий Влади́мирович Пи́чул; 15 June 1961 – 26 July 2015) was a Soviet and Russian film director, best known for his film Little Vera (Маленькая Вера, "Malenkaya Vera" in Russian), released in 1988. His film How Dark the Nights Are on the Black Sea was screened in the Un Certain Regard section at the 1990 Cannes Film Festival.

He died of lung cancer.

== Selected filmography ==
- Little Vera (1988)
- How Dark the Nights Are on the Black Sea (1989)
- Dreams of an idiot (1993)
