= Philadelphia Film Festival =

American film festival

- Location: Philadelphia, Pennsylvania, U.S.
- Founded: 1991
- Awards: Lumiere Award
- Producers: Philadelphia Film Society
- Website: filmadelphia.org/festival

The Philadelphia Film Festival is a film festival founded by the Philadelphia Film Society and held in Philadelphia, Pennsylvania. The annual festival is held at various theater venues throughout the Philadelphia metropolitan area.

== Overview ==
The annual festival lasts for two weeks in October. The festival also holds a three day "springfest" in June.

Current venues include the Prince Theater, now known as the Film Society Center, the Film Society Bourse theater, and the Film Society East theater.

Previous venues have included the Annenberg Center for the Performing Arts, the PFS Roxy Theater, the Landmark Ritz Theatres, and the PFS Drive-In at the Navy Yard.

Screening categories hosted by the festival include Centerpieces, Spotlights, Special Events, Masters of Cinema, World View, Non/Fiction, After Hours, From the Vaults, Made in USA, Cinema de France, Green Screen (Environmental films), Visions of Iran, "Sights and Soundtrack" and short films. Its Filmadelphia category, previously known as "Festival of the Independents," promotes local filmmakers.

Notable members of the Festival Advisory Board include Aubrey Plaza and Adam McKay.

== History ==
Until 2009, it was held during the first weeks of April; after which, the Film Festival shifted its dates from the spring to the fall in October. About 35,000 tickets sold in the 20th annual Film Festival to over 250 screenings.

Notable films at the festival have included Silver Linings Playbook (set in Philadelphia), Border, Burning, Green Book, The Guilty, Happy as Lazzaro, Roma, Shoplifters, Parasite, Jojo Rabbit, Portrait of a Lady on Fire, Beanpole, Knives Out, Blue Velvet (1986), Magnolia (1999), Nomadland, Ammonite, Black Bear, Minari, Sound of Metal, Philly native Questlove's directorial debut Summer of Soul, The Sparks Brothers and Werewolves Within.

In 2017, M. Night Shyamalan and David Plaza (father of Aubrey) joined the Philadelphia Film Society's board of directors.

Due to the impact of the COVID-19 pandemic, the PFF screened most of their films virtually in October 2020. Other films were shown via a drive-in format at the Philadelphia Navy Yard.

In October 2021, the 30th Anniversary Film Festival screened Belfast, The Electrical Life of Louis Wain, King Richard, The French Dispatch, Encounter, and Spencer.

== See also ==
- Philadelphia Asian American Film Festival
- Philadelphia Independent Film Festival
- Philadelphia International Gay & Lesbian Film Festival
