= Emma Eliza Regan =

Irish actress

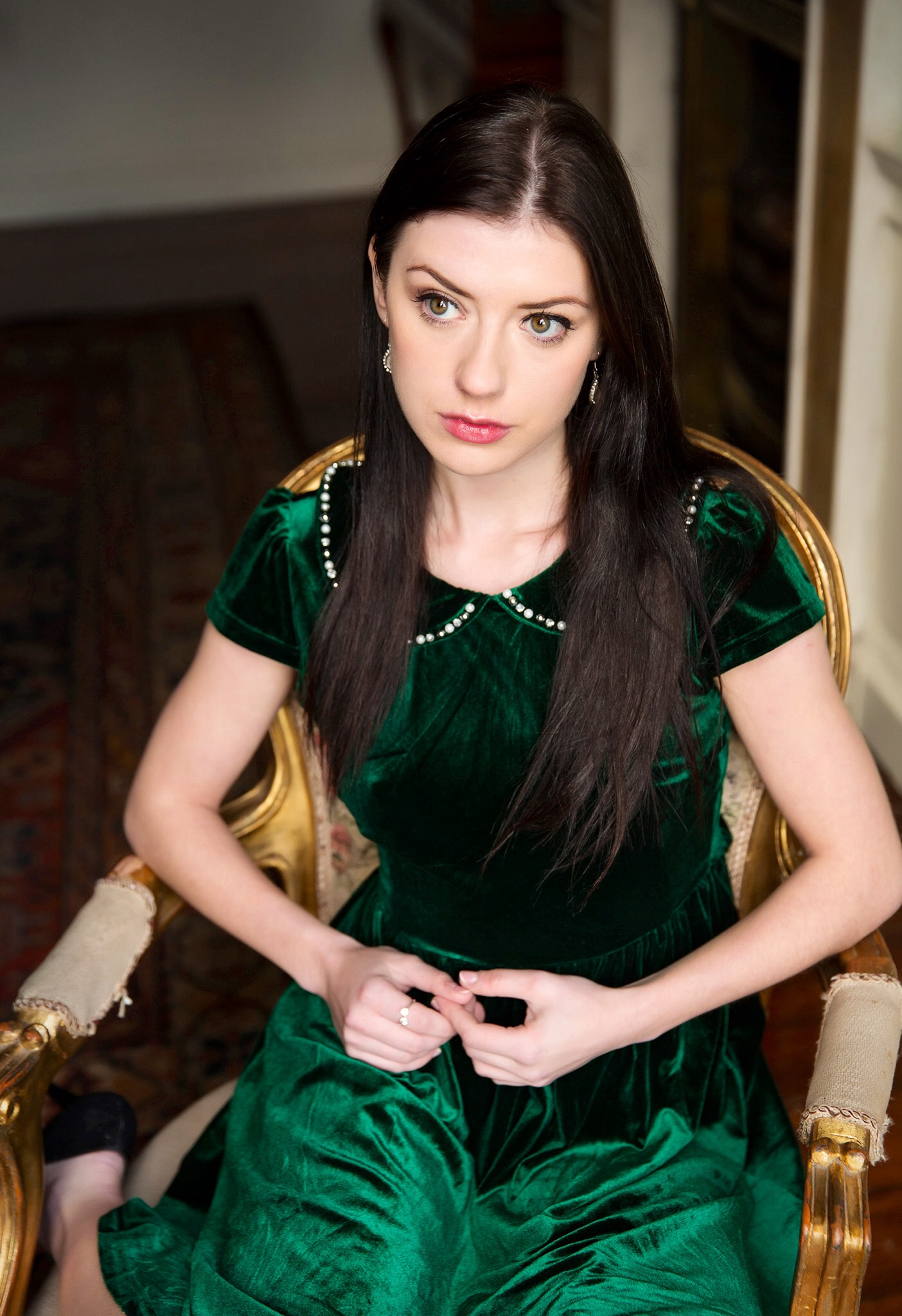
- Regan in 2014
- Born: Emma Eliza Regan; 1989 (age 36–37); Moycullen, County Galway, Ireland
- Occupations: Actress; journalist; model
- Years active: 2007–present
- Relatives: Mary Regan (sister)

Emma Eliza Regan (born in 1989) is an Irish actress who has appeared in Irish feature films The Fading Light (2009), Love Eternal (2013), Darkness on the Edge of Town (2014), and Penance 2018, and on television in Aisling's Diary (2009), Jack Taylor (2012), and Vikings (2020).

== Early life and education ==
Regan grew up in Moycullen, Connemara, her father an innkeeper of the local pub. Regan trained in classical ballet and contemporary dance with Alan Foley, artistic director of Cork City Ballet. She has studied at Bow Street Academy (formerly The Factory's Actors Studio) in Grand Canal Dock, Dublin, a creative hub where industry leaders mentor future industry leaders, working alongside Lance Daly, Shimmy Marcus, John Carney and Jim Sheridan.

== Theatre ==
Regan performed her stage debut at The Abbey Theatre as Mollser in a Wayne Jordon production of The Plough and the Stars in 2010.

== Film and television ==
In 2007, Regan made her screen début in the Ivan Kavanagh horror film Tin Can Man, opposite Michael Parle; The film went on to win several international awards (including Boundary Breaking Best Feature at the Sydney Underground Film Festival and Melbourne Underground Film Festival) prior to its worldwide release.

In her late teens, she became known for her role as Fiona in the RTÉ drama Aisling's Summer Diary – TV Series created by Dublin-based CR Entertainment which won the best international Teen TV Movie at Kidscreen New York in 2010.

Performances in independent films include Our Wonderful Home, and The Fading Light (winner of the Jameson Dublin International Film Festival). Further work included the leading role in fantasy film The Shadows, based on a George MacDonald dark fairytale, and directed by Colin Downey. with the Irish Film Board, which premiered at Galway Film Fleadh.

Regan also played schoolgirl Cathy in Love Eternal, directed by Brendan Muldowney which has been adapted from the Japanese novel Loving the Dead by prolific horror author Kei Ōishi (The Grudge). Love Eternal won the Fresh Blood Award at the inaugural Black Bear Film Festival in Warsaw. The film premiered earlier in 2013 at the Galway Film Fleadh and has screened at over at over fifty festivals and markets worldwide, including Sitges and Busan, one of the largest film festivals in Asia.

In 2014 she starred with Brian Gleeson in The Irish Western Darkness on the Edge of Town the first independently funded Irish film to feature at the Sundance Film Festival. The film was later picked up by Netflix for and shown across the United States and Canada.

In 2015, Regan starred in the feature movie Get Up And Go in 2015, starring Peter Coonan and Killian Scott of Irish IFTA award-winning drama Love/Hate, and Irish film Fading Away in 2016.

in 2017, Regan got a taste of other areas of the film industry when writing, directing and acting in her own short film Wild Fire Nights highlighting the problems of troubled and dysfunctional young women like Lila as she portrays in the 17 minute film, which was first shown at the Galway Film Fleadh 2017.

In 2023, she starred as Niamh in the feature film Advent, written by and starring Emmett Hughes; the film premiered at the 2023 Newport Beach Film Festival.

== Journalism ==
Regan also doubles as a travel and cultural columnist for several publications and outlets, including RTÉ, and others. She wrote daily columns on her experiences at the Cannes Film Festival. She was cover girl on the glossy publication 'Galway Now' magazine in July 2013.

== Contemporary art ==
Regan collaborated with Sara Hibbert on three pieces -Abonnés Series of stills, Flowers of the Gutter a four-screen video installation and Dancer Somnambulism . These projects have been exhibited in One Marylebone Place in 2010 for Intel's and Jotta Remastered Exhibition, London Design Festival, Orientations: Hoxton Art Gallery in London, CUBE Gallery, Cork Street Gallery in Mayfair, London.

== Filmography ==
=== Film and video ===
Year	Title of Production	Role	Notes/ref
2007	Tin Can Man	Mel	Directed by Ivan Kavanagh
2008	Our Wonderful Home	Emma	Director: Ivan Kavanagh
2009	The Fading Light	Cathy	Feature film
2010	The Death of James Connolly	Nora	Short film
2011	Death of a Superhero	Morna	Film
2012	Ninety Seconds	Elly	Short film
2012	Out There (Short film)	Jane	by Baron Randal Plunkett
2013	The Shadows	Alica	Film
2013	Love Eternal	Cathy Malone	Film
2013	I Am Cursed	Alicia 'Mysterious Girl'	Film
2013	Out of Here	Ruth	Film
2014	Hollow lands	The Woman	Short Film
2014	After	Shauna	Short Film
2014	Guardian of the Ancient Shadow Crown	Alice	Film
2014	Darkness on the Edge Of Town	Cleo Callahan	Film
2015	The Second Coming	Maud Gonne	Film
2015	Get Up And Go	Tara	Film
2015	Fading Away	Sive	Film
2015	Ar Scáth le Chéile	Aoife Doyle	Short film
2016	Adulting	Emer	Short film
2016	The Irish Mob	Re-enactment Actress	Frank 'Dunie' Ryan: West End & Stopwatch Gang
2017	Wild Fire Nights	Lila	Short film (Writer, Director & Actor)
2017	Maeve and the Moon	Rhiannon	Short film
2017	Hexing	Hannah	Film
2017	The Second Coming Vol.2	Maud Gonne	Film
2017	Roth	Gracie	Film
2017	How to Make a Film	Anna Rose	Film
2018	Dead Drop Love	The Courtesan	Short film
2018	Penance	Aine Ni Laoighrie	Film
2018	Rapacious	Girl	Short film
2018	Sorry	the Girlfriend	Video short
2023	Advent	Niamh	Film

=== Television ===
Year	Title of Production	Role	Notes/ref
2009	Aisling's Diary	Fiona	TV series 6 episodes
2010	1916 Seachtar na Cásca	Nora	1 episode - Eamonn Ceannt
2012	Jack Taylor	Karen	1 episode - The Dramatist
2013	1916 Seachtar Dearmadta	Mabel Gorman	1 episode - Willie Pearse
2015	Burning Wishes	Sheila	1 episode 1.1
2019	Der Irland-Krimi	Maggie Dunne	1 episode - Mädchenjäger
2020	Vikings (season 6)	Aoife	episode 6.8 - Valhalla Can Wait

=== Music video appearances ===
Year	Title	Artist	Role
2014	"In Flight"	Daithí Ó Drónaí	brunette female
2023	"In the Eyes"	Sistir	main female
