= D. J. Kane =

Irish Gaelic footballer

D.J. Kane
Personal information
- Native name: D.S. Mac Catháin (Irish)
- Born: Newry, County Down, Northern Ireland
- Occupation: Teacher
- Height: 5 ft 10 in (178 cm)

Sport
- Sport: Gaelic football
- Position: Right wing-back
Club
- Years: Club
- 1980s-2000s: Newry Shamrocks
Club titles
- Down titles: 0
College titles
- Sigerson titles: 2
Inter-county
- Years: County
- 1986-1999: Down
Inter-county titles
- Ulster titles: 3
- All-Irelands: 2
- NFL: 2 (Div 2 & Div 3)
- All Stars: 1

D.J. Kane (born 1964, Newry, County Down) is a former Gaelic footballer from Northern Ireland. He played with his local club Newry Mitchels but moved to Newry Shamrocks and was a member of the Down senior inter-county team from the 1980s until the 1990s. Kane captained Down to the All-Ireland title in 1994.

== Personal life ==
His brother Val had been a substitute on the Down team that won the All-Ireland title in 1968.

He is the uncle of Irish actress Valene Kane.

== Honours ==
- Dr. McKenna Cup (5) 1987 1989 1992 1996 1998
- Ryan Cup (3) 1987 1988 1989
- Railway Cup (3) 1993 1994 1995
- Ulster Senior Football Championship (2) 1991 1994 (C)
- All-Ireland Senior Football Championship (2) 1991 1994 (C)
- Sigerson Cup (2) 1986 1987 (C)
- Down Minor Football Championship (1)1981 1982
- Ulster Under-21 Football Championship (1) 1984
- GAA GPA All Stars Awards (1) 1994
- MacRory Cup (1) 1982
- Down Senior Football League (1) 1997
- National Football League Division 2 (1) 1988
- National Football League Division 3 (1) 1997

Sporting positions
Preceded by	Down Senior Football Captain; 1994	Succeeded by
Achievements
Preceded by Henry Downey (Down)	All-Ireland Senior Football winning captain 1994	Succeeded by John O'Leary (Dublin)
