= Everybody Digs Bill Evans (film) =

2026 UK-Ireland biopic film

- Promotional poster
- Directed by: Grant Gee
- Screenplay by: Mark O'Halloran
- Based on: Intermission by Owen Martell
- Produced by: Janine Marmot; Alan Maher
- Starring: Anders Danielsen Lie; Bill Pullman; Barry Ward; Laurie Metcalf; Valene Kane; Katie McGrath
- Cinematography: Piers McGrail
- Edited by: Adam Biskupski
- Music by: Roger Goula
- Production companies: Bona Fide Productions; Cowtown Pictures; Hot Property Films
- Release dates: 13 February 2026 (Berlinale); 11 September 2026 (UK & Ireland)
- Running time: 102 minutes
- Countries: United Kingdom; Ireland
- Language: English

Everybody Digs Bill Evans is a 2026 biographical drama film directed by Grant Gee and starring Anders Danielsen Lie, Bill Pullman, Barry Ward, Laurie Metcalf, Valene Kane and Katie McGrath. It was written by Mark O'Halloran based on the 2013 novel Intermission by Owen Martell. The film dramatises a turbulent period in the life of musician Bill Evans.

The title of the film is taken from Evans' 1959 album Everybody Digs Bill Evans.

== Premise ==
In June 1961 in New York City, jazz pianist Bill Evans is playing with what he considers his perfect musical trio. However, following the tragic death of his bass player Scott LaFaro, Evans is traumatized by grief and unsure whether he can continue playing.

== Cast ==
- Anders Danielsen Lie as Bill Evans
- Bill Pullman as Harry Evans
- Barry Ward as Harry Evans Junior
- Laurie Metcalf as Mary Evans
- Valene Kane as Ellaine Schultz
- Katie McGrath as Pat Evans

== Production ==
Producers include Janine Marmot for Hot Property Films, and Alan Maher for Cowtown Pictures. The film was shot partially on 16mm and in black and white, and had support from the British Film Institute and Screen Ireland.

Principal photography took place in County Cork from May 2025.

== Release ==
Breakout Pictures bought distribution rights for the UK and Ireland in May 2025. It premiered at the 2026 76th Berlin International Film Festival, and at the 2026 Dublin International Film Festival. The film was released in Cinemas by Modern Films in the UK and Ireland on September 11, 2026.

== Reception ==
Peter Bradshaw in The Guardian gave the film 4/5 stars, writing: "This elusive, ruminative and very absorbing movie presents its successive scenes like a sequence of unresolved chords carrying the listener on a journey without a destination – and is, incidentally, one of those rare films featuring a wonderful supporting turn that does not undermine or upstage the rest."

Time Out also gave 4 stars; John Bleasdale wrote: "The minor and major chords are played close together in this moving and beautifully shot and performed portrait of jazz's legendary pianist, Bill Evans. Norwegian actor Anders Danielsen Lie (Sentimental Value) tickles the ivories with a melancholy charm in a quiet and restrained performance. He looks album-cover cool, while at the same time drifting through a life marked with tragedy and addiction."

In Uncut, Stephen Troussé gave 4.5 stars, writing: "Without ever canonising Evans as some holy jazz ruin ... Gee makes the patient, uncanny beauty of his music seem all the more remarkable."

In The Observer, Wendy Ide wrote: "It's perhaps an unexpected choice to tell the story of a renowned musician by focusing predominantly on the period in which the music stopped. But this dextrously structured biographical drama ... understands that moments of arrested stillness can be as important in the account of a life as the journey forward."

== Accolades ==
Grant Gee was awarded the Silver Bear for Best Director at the 2026 76th Berlin International Film Festival.
