= Profile (2018 film) =

- Theatrical release poster
- Directed by: Timur Bekmambetov
- Screenplay by: Timur Bekmambetov; Britt Poulton; Olga Kharina
- Based on: In the Skin of a Jihadist by Anna Erelle
- Produced by: Timur Bekmambetov; Olga Kharina
- Starring: Valene Kane; Shazad Latif; Christine Adams; Amir Rahimzadeh; Morgan Watkins; Emma Cater
- Edited by: Andrey Shugaev
- Music by: Andy Ross
- Production company: Bazelevs Company
- Distributed by: Focus Features
- Release dates: February 17, 2018 (Berlin); May 14, 2021 (United States)
- Running time: 106 minutes
- Countries: United States; United Kingdom; Cyprus; Russia
- Language: English
- Budget: $2.3 million
- Box office: $1.9 million

Profile is a 2018 screenlife thriller film directed by Timur Bekmambetov, from a screenplay by Bekmambetov, Britt Poulton, and Olga Kharina, based upon the non-fiction book In The Skin of a Jihadist by Anna Erelle. It stars Valene Kane, Shazad Latif, Christine Adams, Amir Rahimzadeh and Morgan Watkins.

The film had its world premiere at the 68th Berlin International Film Festival on February 17, 2018, in the Panorama section. It was released in the United States on May 14, 2021, by Focus Features, and received mixed reviews from critics.

== Plot ==
In order to investigate the recruitment of young European women by ISIS, journalist Amy Whittaker creates a new Facebook profile under the alias of Melody Nelson. She creates a persona online of a woman who has recently converted to Islam.

Soon Amy is contacted by Bilel, an ISIS fighter from Syria. They begin talking to each other regularly and after some time she begins to develop real romantic feelings for him.

After weeks and weeks of talking via Skype, he convinces her to marry him, promising her the world. Although conflicted as she doesn’t think it holds any legal weight, she says the words he tells her to, telling her they are now married. He then tells Amy she must to go to Syria. Amy fights with herself—trying to convince herself it’s all for her work and the article. She does as instructed by Bilel and gets as far as Amsterdam, over a phone conversation she finds out Bilel won’t be meeting her and he is sending someone else to meet her, when she questions him he gets angry with her, then he takes a phone call while on Skype with her, she asks a Muslim friend to translate some of what he was saying to his friend. Her friend tells her he was negotiating a price and informing him of her eye colour and when she will be arriving. Amy, realizing that he was planning on trafficking her when she arrived in Syria, goes back to England as soon as she can. Bilel finds out about this and her true identity, gets angry and threatens to post videos all over social media asking all ISIS supporters to kill her and she is a traitor. Bilel is found in Syria and it turns out he has many wives and children.

Amy goes ahead and prints her article outing him and hoping that warning other girls will save more from joining ISIS.

== Cast ==
- Valene Kane as Amy Whittaker
- Shazad Latif as Bilel
- Christine Adams as Vick
- Morgan Watkins as Matt
- Amir Rahimzadeh as Lou
- Emma Cater as Kathy
- Kelley Mack as Converted female
- Marie Hamilton as Waitress

== Production ==
The film is based on French journalist Anna Erelle's book In the Skin of a Jihadist about her investigation into the recruitment of young women by ISIS.

== Release ==
The film had its world premiere at the Berlin International Film Festival on February 17, 2018. It also screened at South by Southwest on March 11, 2018. In March 2021, Focus Features acquired distribution rights to the film, and set it for a May 14, 2021, release.

== Reception ==
=== Box office ===
In the United States, Profile was released alongside Spiral, Those Who Wish Me Dead, and Finding You, and grossed $260,000 from 2,033 theaters on its first day of release. It went on to debut to $730,290, finishing ninth at the box office.

=== Critical response ===
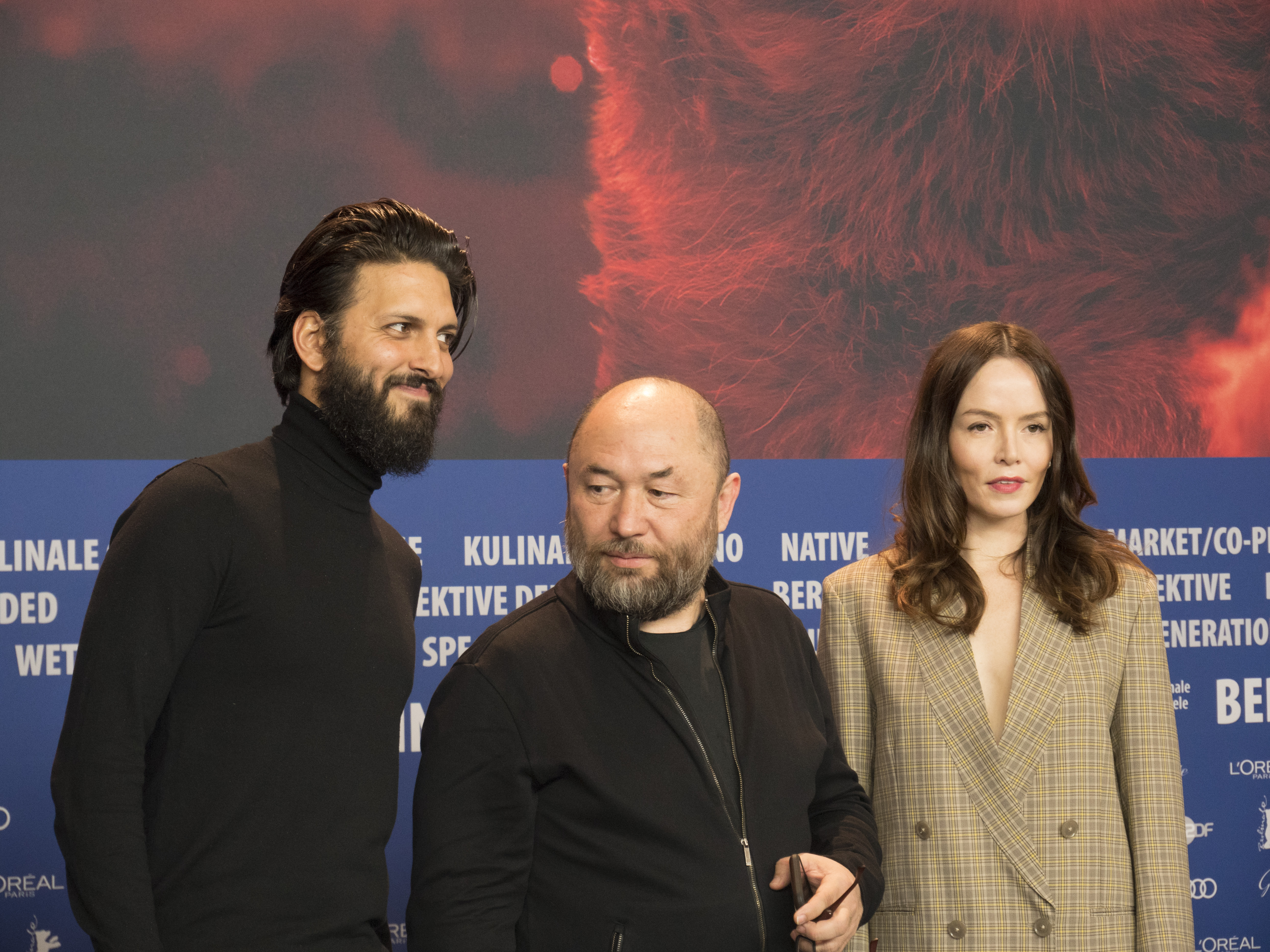
(L:R) Shazad Latif, Timur Bekmambetov, Valene Kane at Berlinale 2018

On review aggregator website Rotten Tomatoes, the film holds an approval rating of 62% based on 94 reviews, and an average rating of 6/10. The site's critics consensus reads: "Profile's unique narrative gimmick is enough to carry the film partway, but it's ultimately overwhelmed by an increasingly ludicrous plot." On Metacritic, the film has a weighted average score of 54 out of 100, based on 22 critics, indicating "mixed or average reviews". Audiences polled by CinemaScore gave the film an average grade of "B" on an A+ to F scale, while PostTrak reported 65% of audience members gave it a positive score, with 37% saying they would definitely recommend it.

==== Awards ====
ˑ Panorama Audience Award, Berlinale (shared with The Silence of Others)

ˑ Prix spécial du jury, La Roche-sur-Yon

ˑ Audience Award, South by Southwest
