= Kelly + Victor =

- Theatrical release poster
- Directed by: Kieran Evans
- Screenplay by: Kieran Evans
- Story by: Niall Griffiths
- Based on: Kelly + Victor by Niall Griffiths
- Produced by: Janine Marmot
- Starring: Antonia Campbell-Hughes; Julian Morris
- Cinematography: Piers McGrail
- Edited by: Tony Kearns; Nathan Nugent
- Music by: Steve Fanagan
- Production companies: Hot Property Films; Venom Films
- Distributed by: Verve Pictures
- Release dates: 16 October 2012 (BFI London Film Festival); 20 September 2013 (United Kingdom)
- Running time: 94 minutes
- Countries: United Kingdom; Ireland
- Language: English

Kelly + Victor is a 2012 romantic drama film written and directed by Kieran Evans, based on Niall Griffiths's 2002 novel of the same name. Starring Antonia Campbell-Hughes and Julian Morris, the film follows a young couple embarking on a passionate love affair. The film won the BAFTA Award for Outstanding Debut by a British Writer, Director or Producer in 2014. It was released in the United Kingdom on 20 September 2013 by Verve Pictures.

== Plot ==
Kelly and Victor meet on the dance floor of a Liverpool nightclub, both of them on drugs. They quickly leave the club and return to Kelly's flat where they take more drugs and drink whiskey together. While they have sex, Kelly chokes and bites Victor for sexual gratification and admits to him in the morning that she got carried away.

Kelly's fetish is mirrored when she joins her dominatrix friend in whipping a masked man to earn some money, but she struggles to play the role of dominatrix and does not enjoy the experience. On a visit to her mother's house, Kelly finds that her mother has invited her ex-boyfriend, who is clearly still infatuated with Kelly but is not allowed within three metres due to a restraining order.

Victor sets up another date with Kelly, telling her in the pub that he would do anything for her and that their relationship is something special. Later, Kelly ties Victor's hands while they have sex, chokes him and carves the phrase "K + V" into his back using cut glass. Victor tells his friends and sister that he no longer wants to see Kelly but is clearly still preoccupied by her.

After returning from a party, Victor finds Kelly bleeding in the street after she has been attacked by her ex-boyfriend. He takes her to A&E and the two return home again together. Kelly again strangles Victor with a tie, him insisting that he will tap her when he has had enough. However, Kelly gets carried away and does not notice that Victor is unable to tap her. He dies from asphyxiation, leaving Kelly distraught and listening to a CD mixtape that he made for her.

== Production ==
The film was shot almost entirely in Liverpool, with one sequence filmed in North Wales.

== Critical response ==
The film received positive reviews. Trevor Johnston of Sight & Sound magazine named Kieran Evans "the most exciting British filmmaker to emerge in the wake of Lynne Ramsay, Steve McQueen and Andrea Arnold".

== Cast ==
- Antonia Campbell-Hughes as Kelly
- Julian Morris as Victor
- William Ruane as Craig
- Stephen Walters as Gaz
- Claire Keelan as Victoria
- Mark Womack as Frank
- Michael Ryan as Pete Tucker
- Stephen Aintree as Baz
