= Manon Capelle =

Belgian actress

Manon Capelle is a Belgian actress. She made her film debut in All Cats Are Grey (2014), in which she starred alongside Bouli Lanners and Anne Coesens. The film received nine nominations at the 6th Magritte Awards, including Most Promising Actress for Capelle.

== Filmography ==
- 2014: All Cats Are Grey - Dorothy
- 2017: Art of Crime (TV series) - Noémie (Stéphanie Lombard, age 17)
- 2018: L'ecole est finie Cindy
- 2018: Through the Fire - Lili et Maya bébés
- 2019: Never Grow Old - Emily Crabtree.
- 2021: Le chemin du bonheur Eve
- 2022: Oxymort (short) - Louise
