= Tin Can Man (film) =

2007 film directed by Ivan Kavanagh

- Directed by: Ivan Kavanagh
- Screenplay by: Ivan Kavanagh
- Produced by: Ivan Kavanagh; Ann Marie Naughton
- Starring: Michael Parle; Patrick O'Donnell; Emma Eliza Regan
- Cinematography: Colin Downey
- Edited by: Ivan Kavanagh
- Music by: Ivan Kavanagh
- Release dates: 12 March 2007 (Sydney Underground Film Festival); 22 April 2014 (VOD)
- Running time: 83 minutes
- Country: Ireland
- Language: English

Tin Can Man is a 2007 Irish horror written and directed by Ivan Kavanagh and starring Michael Parle, Patrick O'Donnell and Emma Eliza Regan. O'Donnell plays a man who lets a stranger (Parle) into his house one evening and has his life turned upside down as he is forced on a dark journey to becoming the titular Tin Can Man. Unusual for a modern film, it was shot in black and white in a 4:3 aspect ratio.

The film made its premiere at the Sydney Underground Film Festival. Despite critical acclaim, it remained in distribution limbo until 2014 when it was released on DVD and VOD by Brink Vision.

== Plot ==
Pete's life has been full of letdowns and disappointments, his girlfriend has left him for another man and he works at a job that he despises. One night, while he is alone in his apartment, he is visited by a mysterious stranger who compels him on a dark and twisted journey that will change his life forever.

== Cast ==
- Patrick O'Donnell as Pete
- Michael Parle as Dave
- Emma Eliza Regan as Mel
- Kreeta Taponen as Girlfriend

== Release ==
The film made its premiere at the Sydney Underground Film Festival. Despite critical acclaim, it remained in distribution limbo until 2014 when it was released on DVD and Video On Demand by Brink Vision.

== Reception ==
Tin Can Man received mostly positive review with the atmosphere, photography and performances from the two leads being singled out. Film Ireland wrote "Kavanagh is to be applauded for creating a slice of unrelenting demented thrills". Many reviews pointed out the influence of David Lynch such as Pop Horror who said "Tin Can Man is a David Lynch film that David Lynch didn't direct – a surreal, noir-like nightmare that ingrains itself into the viewer's psyche and stays with them long after the movie has concluded." Its low budget constraints were praised in a review from Staying Scared who wrote, "by utilizing shades of Twilight Zone type eerie and weird camera angles used to near perfection, suspense and horror are created from virtually nothing." Horror News. Net has mixed feelings by saying, "What really stands out in Tin Can Man are the performances of the two lead actors. O’Donnell and Parle excel with the material and make the most of their screen time. Parle masterfully makes the character of Dave into a menacing, insane threat. It is easy to believe that he could be so forcefully manipulative. O’Donnell plays the spineless lead of Peter so well that you pity him while also sympathizing with him and the situation he has been forced into." Paul Freitag-Fey also had mixed verdict in his review for Daily Grindhouse: "He's not someone you can root for or readily identify with, and that, in the end, is the biggest flaw that TIN CAN MAN has." But also concluded, "The first half hour, however, sports an intensity that few films can reach."
