= Son (2021 film) =

2021 Irish-American horror thriller film

- Film poster
- Directed by: Ivan Kavanagh
- Written by: Ivan Kavanagh
- Produced by: Rene Bastian; Ben Cornwell; Anne Marie Naughton; Louis Tisné
- Starring: Emile Hirsch; Andi Matichak; Luke David Blumm
- Cinematography: Piers McGrail
- Edited by: Robin Hill
- Music by: Aza Hand
- Production companies: Belladonna Productions; Elastic Film; Park Films; Pigeon Roost
- Distributed by: RLJE Films
- Release date: 5 March 2021
- Running time: 98 minutes
- Countries: Ireland; United States
- Language: English
- Box office: $69,739

Son is a 2021 Irish-American horror thriller film written and directed by Ivan Kavanagh. It stars Emile Hirsch, Andi Matichak and Luke David Blumm. The film follows the story of an ex cult escapee who is trying to save her son from the cult's attempts to harm him whilst dealing with the realization that something sinister might have already invaded her son.

== Plot ==
Whilst fleeing a cult via car, Laura begins to go into labor and pulls over to the side of the road, where she gives birth to a boy. Eight years later, Laura is living a normal life with her son David. One night, when checking on David, Laura sees a group of strangers standing around his bed before the door suddenly slams shut and locks. Laura goes to her neighbor Susan, and asks her to call the police. Upon returning to David's room, the people are gone, and David is lying on the bed looking sick. Two police officers, Paul and Steve, visit her, and while Paul is sympathetic towards her, Steve is dismissive of her, believing her to be delusional. Paul gives Laura his card and tells her to call him if anything else happens. That night, David vomits blood, and Laura takes him to the hospital. At the hospital, the doctors are unable to find the cause of David's sickness and warn Laura that he might not recover. Laura falls asleep at David's bedside and has a flashback dream to her time with the cult, including a banner with the words "He Is Coming" painted on it. She awakens to find that David has miraculously recovered.

Finally home, Laura informs Paul of her plans to sell the house and flee. Paul, however, encourages Laura to stay. The two of them begin to kiss but are interrupted when David begins to scream, and they find him convulsing in his bed. After David is re-admitted to the hospital, Laura overhears the doctors having a suspicious conversation, so she grabs David, and they flee to Susan's house. While there, Susan is briefly in charge of David when Laura leaves to get some items. Upon returning, Laura finds that David has murdered Susan and is eating her flesh and, in doing so, has made a full recovery. After cleaning up David, who seems to have no memory of what happened, Laura paints "He Is Coming" and the Cult's symbol on the wall, hoping to cast the blame on them. She and David, yet again, flee to a motel.

Meanwhile, Steve shows Paul a series of newspaper clippings about Laura's past, where her name is revealed to be Anna and that she was being held prisoner by a sexually abusive cult. Steve poses that Laura is suffering a mental breakdown but Paul expresses sympathy for her. Laura goes to visit her friend Jimmy, a fellow escapee of the cult. Jimmy reveals to Laura that when she was in the cult, she was impregnated by a demon. Steve and Paul track down Jimmy, only to find him dead, with several crosses shoved in his mouth, and the words "He Is Coming" painted in blood on his body. While at another motel, David narrates a disturbing dream he had to Laura, and Laura tells David that she can't help him anymore. That night, cultists barge into Laura and David's motel room, and Laura fires at them, killing them all, but when she turns the lights on, it is revealed that they weren't cultists, but Steve and two other officers.

Laura returns to the Cult's house where she performs a rite to summon the demon, planning to give David to him so that he can be saved. Just before the demon takes David, Paul and another officer barge into the room and the Demon vanishes. Laura tries to stab David, but the officer shoots her dead before she can kill him. At a hospital, David is lying in bed, and Paul feeds David his blood. It is revealed through flashback that Paul was the one who killed Jimmy, and that this whole time, he has been a member of the cult who has been manipulating Laura. The demon appears in the hospital room, and David embraces his father/the demon as the film ends.

== Cast ==
- Andi Matichak as Laura
- Emile Hirsch as Paul
- Luke David Blumm as David
- Cranston Johnson as Steve
- Blaine Maye as Jimmy Naegle
- J. Robert Spencer as Dr. Bauhn
- Rocco Sisto as Dr. Bradlee
- Kristine Nielsen as Mrs. Naegle
- Ethan McDowell as Dr. Lundberg
- Erin Bradley Dangar as Susan
- Adam Stephenson as Father
- David Kallaway as Pimp

== Production ==
Filming occurred in February 2020. The production was beset by a number of disasters during the shoot in Mississippi, including two tornadoes, one of which lifted a huge tree onto one of the houses where they were due to shoot the next day, forcing Kavanagh to rewrite the scene, incorporating this into the story. Kavanagh was also approached by a self-proclaimed Satanist on set who said they were messing with dark forces and should stop, which gave way to rumors that the film was cursed.

== Release ==
RLJE Films acquired the distribution rights for the film, which was released on March 5, 2021.

== Reception ==
On the review aggregator website Rotten Tomatoes, 79% of 42 critics' reviews are positive. The website's consensus reads: "A horror story with unexpected emotional resonance, Son uses its familial focus to counter a certain queasy familiarity." Metacritic, which uses a weighted average, assigned the film a score of 54 out of 100, based on 6 critics, indicating "mixed or average" reviews.

On Common Sense Media, Jeffrey M. Anderson rated it 2/5 stars writing that, "generally well-made and well-acted, this horror/thriller still doesn't really work thanks to a repetitive, fairly predictable storyline and many upsetting scenes of a child screaming in pain." Meagan Navarro of Bloody Disgusting rated it 3.5/5 stars writing that "Kavanagh once again delivers potent chills and an ominous atmosphere to create a powerfully discomforting depiction of just how far a mother would go for her son."

Marcos Codas of Dread Central described the film as "a wild ride with a strong message that really rewards the attentive viewer."

== See also ==
- List of thriller films of the 2020s
- List of horror films of 2021
