= The Bathtub (film) =

2016 film

- Original title: Die Badewanne
- Directed by: Tim Ellrich
- Written by: Tim Ellrich; Dominik Huber
- Produced by: Tim Ellrich; Dominik Huber; Leopold Pape
- Starring: Stefan Pohl; Simon Jaritz; Rainer Wöss
- Cinematography: Lukas Gnaiger
- Edited by: Maximilian Merth; Andreas Ribarits
- Release dates: 6 February 2016 (France); 25 May 2016 (Austria); 3 June 2016 (Germany)
- Running time: 13 minutes
- Countries: Austria; Germany
- Language: German

The Bathtub (German: Die Badewanne) is a German-Austrian short film directed by Tim Ellrich. The film released on 8 January 2016 in Germany and screened in France at the Clermont-Ferrand International Short Film Festival, where it won the Special Jury Award in the International Competition. Moreover, the film was chosen to be screened in the Kurzschluss-Programm of Arte and is internationally distributed by the Kurzfilmagentur Hamburg.

== Reception ==
The Desert Sun gave the short a score of eight out of ten, as they felt that it was "an example of a clever idea perfectly realized within the confines of a short film."

=== Awards ===
- Special Jury Awart at the 38th Clermont-Ferrand International Short Film Festival (won)
- Best International Short Film at the Dublin International Film Festival (2016, won)
- Teen View Jury Award at the Nantucket Film Festival (2016, won)
