= Brendan McCaul =

Irish film producer and distributor

Brendan McCaul is an Irish film producer and distributor. He won a Career Achievement Award at the 2007 Jameson Dublin International Film Festival.
