= Valene Kane =

Irish actress

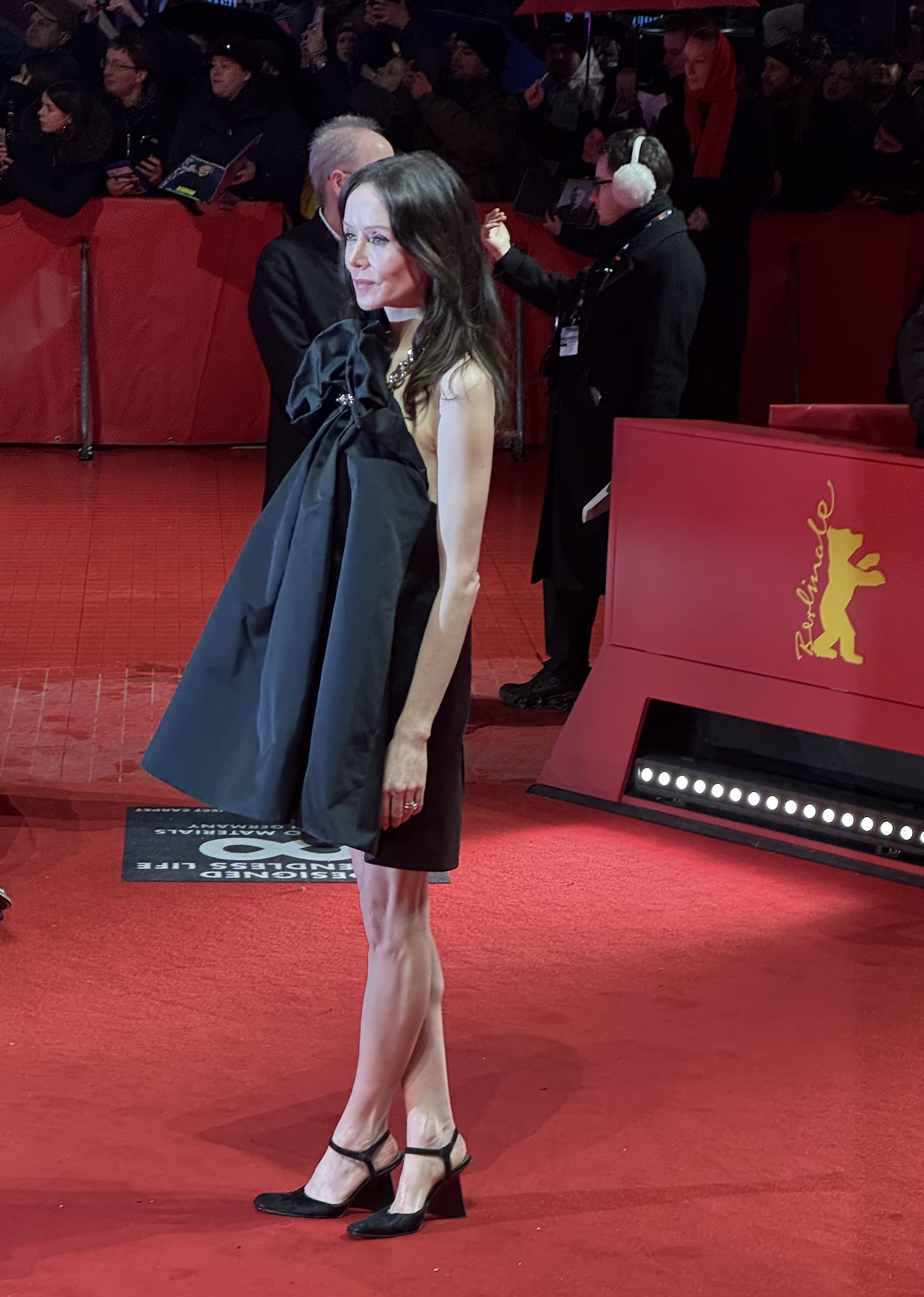
- World premiere of "Everybody Digs Bill Evans"
- Born: Newry, Northern Ireland
- Occupation: Actress
- Years active: 2007–present

Valene Kane is an Irish actress who first gained prominence through her role as Rose Stagg in the BBC Two series The Fall (2013–2016). She also appeared in BBC dramas Thirteen (2016) and Blue Lights (2023–24), the Stan series The Other Guy (2017–2019), the Sky Atlantic series Gangs of London (2020–2022), and the ITVX series The Winter King (2023). Her films include The Fading Light (2010), Rogue One (2016), Profile (2018), and Nowhere Special (2021).

Kane has most recently been seen as Ellaine Schultz in the Berlinale Silver Bear winning biopic of Bill Evans' life Everybody Digs Bill Evans and as Justine in the Channel 4 drama Summerwater

== Early life ==
Kane was born and raised in Newry, County Down. She is the daughter of former Gaelic footballer and coach Val Kane"The Fall's Valene Kane and her GAA dad Val talk pursuing their goals". www.irishnews.com. 24 September 2016.</ref> From the age of 15, she was part of the National Youth Theatre, starring in their production of 20 Cigarettes.

She left Ireland for London at 18 to train at the Central School of Speech and Drama.

== Early career ==
Kane was cast in The Fading Light by the director Ivan Kavanagh after he spotted her in a short film, July, that was posted on YouTube. She was chosen partly for her successful experience with improvisation in that short film.

== Career ==
2013 saw Kane play Rose Stagg in BBC's The Fall, and Dara in the comic Irish thriller Jump. That year, she also played the title role in Strindberg's Miss Julie at the newly founded Reading Rep.

Kane's later work for the BBC included playing the lead detective in BBC Three crime drama Thirteen, the second and third series of The Fall, Scottish court-room drama Murder and, most recently, 2023's hugely popular Blue Lights.

On the big screen, Kane played Lyra Erso in Rogue One: A Star Wars Story.

Stage work has included Nance, in the Finborough Theatre's production of Autumn Fire, The Love in Punchdrunk's production The Black Diamond, which sold out "in mere minutes" and Lady Lydia Languish in The Rivals.

She also played Girleen in Martin McDonagh's The Lonesome West, in which one reviewer said: "Kane gives Girleen a schoolgirl reality, her confident swagger and challenge covering the only genuine feelings for anyone else that the play possesses".

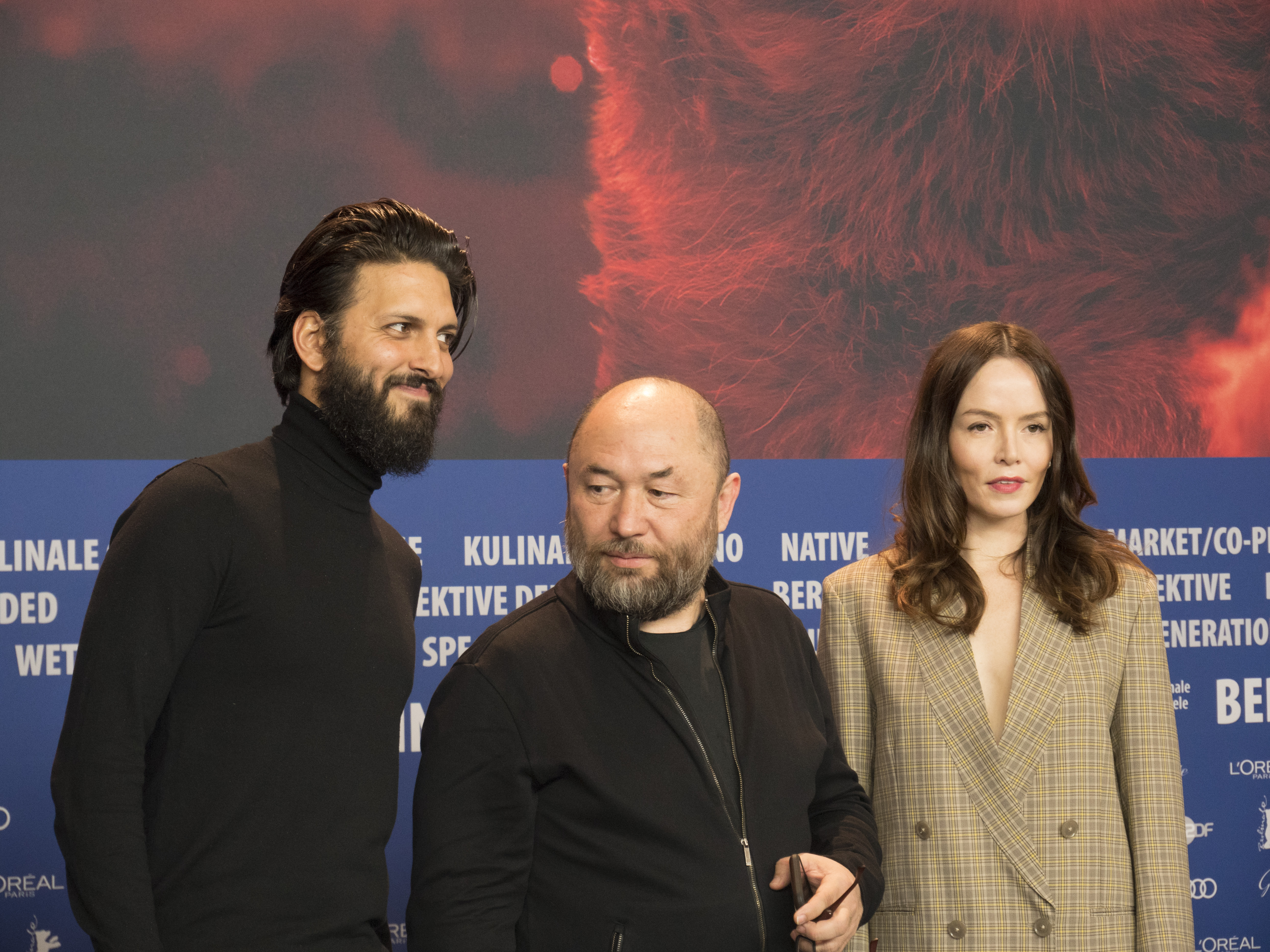
Shazad Latif, Timur Bekmambetov, Valene Kane at the press conference of Profile at Berlinale 2018

In 2018, Valene Kane played journalist Amy Whittaker who investigates the recruitment of young European women by ISIS in the 2018 thriller film Profile by Timur Bekmambetov. The film is confined entirely to her character's computer screen and follows the video calls, emails and messages on her character's screen. It premiered at the 68th Berlin International Film Festival where it won the Panorama Audience Award. and was later picked up and made available on Netflix.

2019 saw Kane in Anne Sewitsky's Sonja: The White Swan which premiered at Sundance Film Festival and in the BBC TV movie Counsel, in which she played "an alpha female barrister [who] complicates her professional and personal life when she takes on a young client." and in the following year she played the lead role in First Person for which she won Best Actress at the Sherman Oaks film festival.

Kane could also be heard on the Monobox Speech Share podcast reading from Marina Carr's "Portia Coughlan".

Kane's radio work includes The Demon Brother and Stroma Sessions for which she won 'Best Supporting Performer'.

In 2023, Kane starred as Lady Macbeth in a "subtly mercurial performance" on the Royal Shakespeare Company main stage in Stratford, England in a production that was "saved by its dark atmosphere and Valene Kane’s turn as Lady Macbeth." She also played Morgan le Fay, King Arthur's half-sister in The Winter King, which premiered on MGM+ in the United States and on ITVX in the UK.

2025 saw the release of her Channel 4's "compelling Scottish drama", Summerwater

== Personal life ==
Kane is married to English actor Ed Cooper Clarke.

== Filmography ==
=== Film ===
Year	Title	Role	Notes
2010	The Fading Light	Yvonne	
2011	War Games	Monica	
2012	Jump	Dara	
2014	'71	Orla	
2016	Rogue One: A Star Wars Story	Lyra Erso	
2017	Ex-Patriot	Riley Connors	
2018	Profile	Amy Whittaker	
2019	Sonja: The White Swan	Connie	
2020	First Person: A Film About Love	Annabelle	Winner: Best Actress
2020	Nowhere Special	Celia	
2023	Five and a Half Love Stories in a Vilnius Apartment	Meghan	
2026	Everybody Digs Bill Evans	Ellaine Schultz	Distributed in UK by Modern Films

=== Television ===
Year	Title	Role	Notes
2013	Casualty	Holly Baddesley	Episode: "The Milk of Human Kindness"
2013–2016	The Fall	Rose Stagg	11 episodes (seasons 1–3)
2016	Thirteen	D.S. Lisa Merchant	5 episodes
2016	Murder	Brennan	Episode: "The Third Voice"
2017–2019	The Other Guy	Olivia Collins	10 episodes
2018	Death and Nightingales	Catherine Winters	3 episodes
2018	Women on the Verge	Siobhan	2 episodes
2018	Queen of the South	Aideen	Episode: "La Muerte"
2018	Counsel	Olivia	Title roll, television film
2020	Hanna	Nicola Gough	Episode: "You're With Us Now"
2020–2022	Gangs of London	Jacqueline Robinson	10 episodes
2023	Blue Lights	Angela	4 episodes
2023	The Winter King	Morgan	9 episodes
2024	Say Nothing	Hannah Hanlon	Episode: "The People in the Dirt"
2025	Summerwater	Justine Tindall	6 episodes

=== Music Videos ===
Year	Title	Artist	Role	Notes
2010	Christina	Boy Mandeville	Girl	Credited as Girl, however video suggests she is Christina

== Accolades ==
The Independent described her performance in The Fall as "the standout performance" of Series 2; "harrowing to watch and completely convincing."

In BBC Three's kidnap drama Thirteen, she starred opposite Jodie Comer as Detective Lisa Merchant in a performance described as "superb" by the Radio Times: "The former star of The Fall's scenes [...] are among the show's most intriguing, simmering with sexual tension and professional frustration."

Kane recently won 'Best Actress in a Lead Role' at the Sherman Oaks Film Festival 2019 for her performance as "a mother [who] refuses to bend to society's mores even in the face of unspeakable tragedy" in First Person: A Film About Love and won the BBC Audio Drama Award for Best Supporting Performer for her role in The Stroma Sessions.

The film Profile, in which she played a struggling undercover journalist who connects with a Jihadi through Facebook, won the Panorama Audience Award at the 68th Berlin International Film Festival.

=== Awards and nominations ===
Award	Year (Note: Year in which awards ceremony was held)	Category	Work	Result	Ref.
BBC Audio Drama Awards	2017	Best Supporting Performer	Stroma Sessions	Won	
Sherman Oaks Film Festival	2019	Best Actress in a Lead Role	First Person: A Film About Love	Won	
Philadelphia Independent Film Festival	2020	Best Actress	First Person: A Film About Love	Nominated	
