= Antonia Campbell-Hughes =

Actress from Northern Ireland

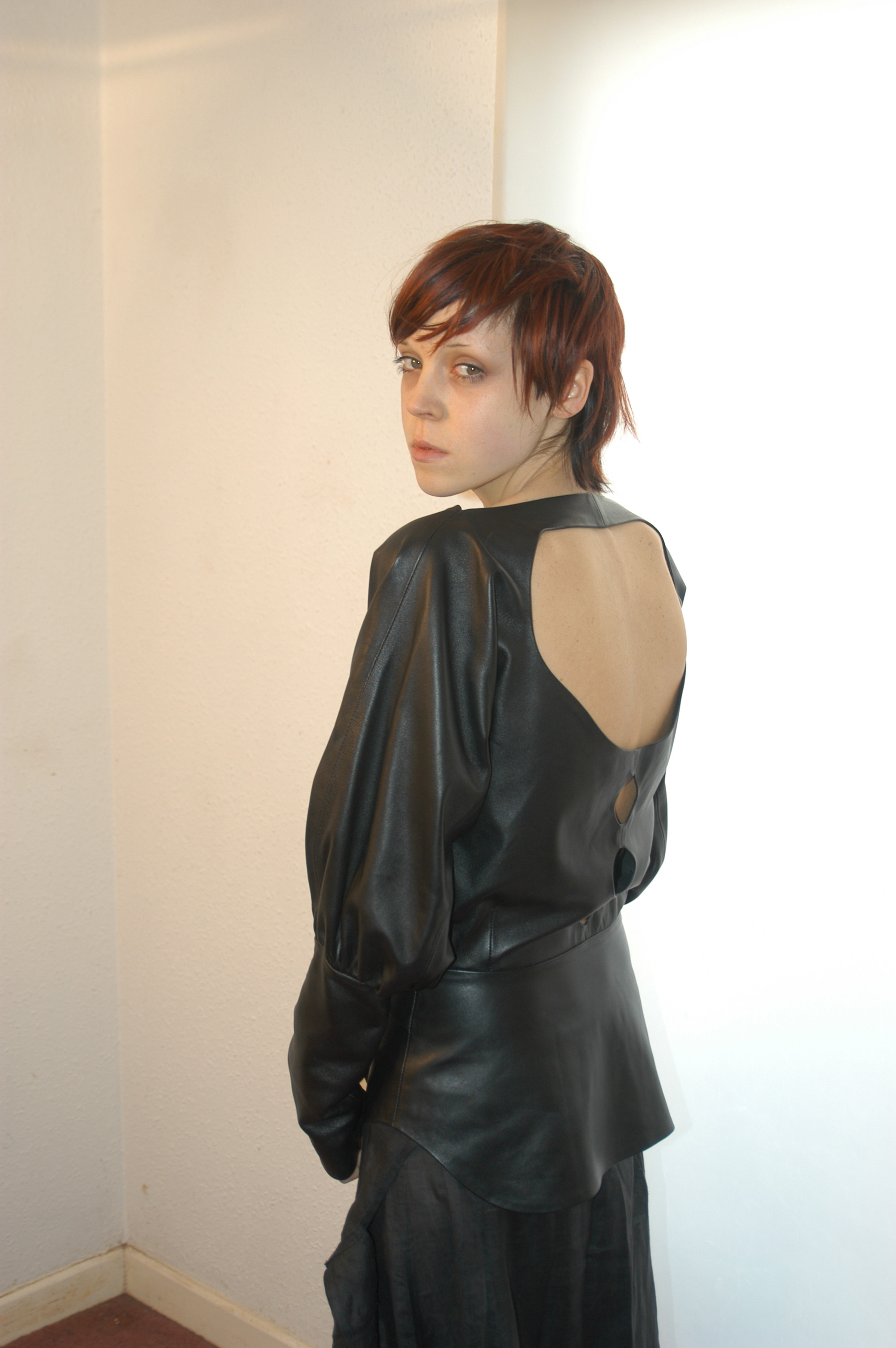
- Antonia Campbell-Hughes c. 2007
- Born: 1982 (age 43–44); Derry, Northern Ireland
- Occupations: Actress; former fashion designer
- Website: Official website

Antonia Campbell-Hughes is an actress, writer, director, and former fashion designer from Northern Ireland. She is best known for playing Natascha Kampusch in 3096 Days, Marie-Antoinette in Dangerous Liaisons and the title role in Cordelia.

She first gained notability as a fashion designer while in her teens. After an early career in comedy, she moved on to more serious acting roles, alongside writing for the screen. Her debut feature film as director, the thriller It Is In Us All, was released in 2022.

== Early life and education ==
Antonia Campbell-Hughes was born in Derry, Northern Ireland, living there until the age of two. Until the age of 16 she moved between the United States, Switzerland, Germany, and England, due to her father's job with chemical firm DuPont.

After experimenting with short film, she went to art school in Dublin. During this time, as a teenager, she started her own fashion label. Her clothing line would sell internationally under her own name, and a diffusion line for high street store Topshop.

== Screen career ==
=== Television ===
Campbell-Hughes' first role was in Jack Dee's sitcom Lead Balloon, which ran for four series, where she played his daughter. Her early career was mostly in comedy, with roles in a variety of comedy shows on British television, alongside Jennifer Saunders and Alex Macqueen, in Sharon Horgan and Stephen Mangan's series Free Agents, among others. In 2009, she created her own show, Bluebell Welch, for MTV, where she played an overzealous, obsessive MTV presenter.

Alongside her comedy projects, she performed smaller, serious roles in popular UK TV series such as Silent Witness, Casualty, Blackbeard: Terror at Sea, and Spooks. She was co-lead in an episode of Channel 4's anthology series Coming Up.

Later, alongside a film career, she took on occasional TV roles, in series such as Lewis, Doll & Em, and London Spy. In 2016 she was a series regular on My Mother and Other Strangers. She played Marie Antoniette in the 2022 STARZ series adaptation of Dangerous Liaisons.

=== Film ===
Her first notable film role was in the Jane Campion feature film Bright Star in 2010. Her first starring role was the 2011 indie drama Lotus Eaters. This was followed by the lead role in the 2012 film Kelly + Victor.

The following year she played Natascha Kampusch in 3096 Days. Natascha, an Austrian, was abducted at age 10 and held captive for eight years, escaping in 2006, a case that made headlines worldwide. Other notable roles followed in movies like Les Cowboys, The Canal and Never Grow Old. She co-starred in the 2022 David Lynch production The Other Me, written and directed by Georgian Giga Agladze.

In 2022, she released her directorial debut It Is In Us All, a thriller that she wrote and in which she plays a supporting role. It was nominated for a pair of British Independent Film Awards and was selected for a number of festivals.

== Awards ==
- 2012: Shooting Stars Award at the 62nd Berlin International Film Festival, annual acting award for up-and-coming actors by European Film Promotion
- 2022: It Is In Us All, winner, Extraordinary Cinematic Vision award at the SXSW Film Festival
- 2022: It Is In Us All, nominated - SXSW Grand Jury Award, Narrative Feature and two British Independent Film Awards

== Filmography ==
=== Film ===
Year	Title	Role	Notes
2007	Tonight Is Cancelled	Nesmir	
2009	Bright Star	Abigail O'Donaghue Brown	
2009	Once Upon a Time in Dublin	Marina	
2010	Five Day Shelter	Paula	
2011	The Task	Angel	
2011	Lotus Eaters	Alice	
2011	The Other Side of Sleep	Arlene Kelly	
2011	Albert Nobbs	Emmy	
2012	Storage 24	Shelley	
2012	Kelly + Victor	Kelly	
2013	3096 Days	Natascha Kampusch	
2013	Under the Skin	The Shadow Alien	
2014	The Canal	Claire	
2015	Les Cowboys	Emma	
2015	Swansong	Jamie	
2015	MindGamers	Agnes	
2015	Andron	Valerie	
2015	Fading Away	Leila	
2015	The Chameleon	Margaret	
2016	Split	Shelley	
2018	Black '47	Brigid Ní Dhomhnaill	
2018	Paul, Apostle of Christ	Irenica	
2018	Zoo	Emily	
2019	She's Missing	Marina	
2019	Never Grow Old	Maria Pike	
2019	Rare Beasts	Cathy	
2019	Cordelia	Cordelia / Caroline	
2020	Zone 414	Jaden	
2022	It Is In Us All	Cara Daly	Directorial debut

=== Television ===
Year	Title	Role	Notes
2005	Casualty	Avril Skinner	"Enough's Enough"
2006	Blackbeard	Louis Arrot	TV miniseries
2006	Silent Witness	Fenella Lee	"Schism: Parts 1 & 2"
2006–2011	Lead Balloon	Sam Spleen	Regular role
2007	Damage	Lauren Ward	TV film
2007	The Life and Times of Vivienne Vyle	Abigail Wilson	Regular role
2007	Coming Up	Carly	"Scapegoat"
2008	Delta Forever	Miranda	"Pilot"
2009	Free Agents	Lucy	"1.2"
2009	Not Safe for Work	Claire Campbell	TV film
2009	Bluebell Welch	Bluebell Welch	TV series
2009	Spooks	Nina Gevitsky	"8.3"
2010	Material Girl	Plum	"1.4"
2010	When Harvey Met Bob	Marsha Hunt	TV film
2011	Lewis	Chloe Brooks	"Old, Unhappy, Far Off Things"
2013	Doll & Em	Miranda	"Six"
2013	The Vatican	Violetta	TV film
2014	Butterfly	Teri	TV short
2015	London Spy	Magician	"I Know"
2016	My Mother and Other Strangers	Kettie Brady	Regular role
2024	Black Doves	George	1 episode
