= Rupert Evans =

British actor

- Born: 9 March 1976 (age 50); Staffordshire, England
- Education: Webber Douglas Academy of Dramatic Art
- Occupation: Actor
- Years active: 1994–present

Rupert Evans (born 9 March 1976) is a British actor. He became known in his first major film role as FBI agent John Myers in Guillermo del Toro's 2004 fantasy superhero film Hellboy.

== Early life and education ==
Rupert Evans was born in Staffordshire, England and was brought up on a farm near Stoke-on-Trent.

He was educated at Bilton Grange School, followed by Milton Abbey School.

He studied acting at the Webber Douglas Academy of Dramatic Art in London, graduating in 2001. He has a brother, Tom Evans, who is a radio DJ.

== Career ==
=== Screen ===
In 2002, Evans appeared in the drama film Crime and Punishment starring John Simm, and then in 2004 in the TV series North and South starring Richard Armitage.

Evans' first major film role was as FBI agent John Myers in director Guillermo del Toro's 2004 adaptation of the Mike Mignola comic book Hellboy. He also appeared in Agora, which was filmed in Malta with Rachel Weisz and Max Minghella.

On television, Evans starred as Edmund Allingham in the BBC's The Village (2013); as Elliot Howe in Rogue; as Peter Fleming in Fleming: The Man Who Would Be Bond; and as Brother Godwyn in World Without End. He also guest-starred in ITV's High Stakes sitcom with Richard Wilson, and Paradise Heights, the BBC drama starring Neil Morrissey. Evans was a lead in the Amazon Prime original series The Man in the High Castle in 2015.

In 2014, Evans starred in the horror film The Canal, and in 2016 had a supporting role in the horror film The Boy. He played the role of Jerry Levov in Ewan McGregor's 2016 feature directorial debut American Pastoral.

In February 2018, Evans was cast in a regular role for The CW's fantasy drama series Charmed, a reboot of the 1998 series of the same name. Evans plays Harry Greenwood, a college professor and the sisters' whitelighter – a guardian angel who protects and guides witches. The show ran for four seasons, until 2022.

In 2021 Evans appeared in Bridgerton series 2, portraying Edmund Bridgerton, late husband to Violet Bridgerton (Ruth Gemmell) and father to the entire Bridgerton clan.

=== Stage ===
Evans has performed extensively on the stage, including in Breathing Corpses at the Royal Court Theatre; Kiss Of The Spider Woman at the Donmar Warehouse; and a season with the Royal Shakespeare Company. in 2009 he performed alongside Dominic West in a new production of Pedro Calderon de la Barca's Spanish classic, Life is a Dream, at the Donmar Warehouse.

== Filmography ==
=== Film ===
Year	Title	Role	Notes
1994	The Browning Version	(unknown)	Uncredited role
2004	Hellboy	John Myers	
2006	Guantanamero	Ali / Jeb	
2008	Sidney Turtlebaum	Gabriel	
2009	Agora	Synesius	
2011	Asylum Blackout	George	aka: The Incident
2011	This Is David Conrad	David Conrad	Short film
2012	Elfie Hopkins	Charlie Gammon	
2014	A Gun	Tilton	Short film
2014	The Canal	David	
2015	Tank 432	Reeves	
2016	The Boy	Malcolm	
2016	American Pastoral	Jerry Levov	
2020	The Doorman	Jon Stanton	
2025	Truth & Treason	Erwin Mussener	Also released as a television mini-series

=== Television ===
Year	Title	Role	Notes
2001	Band of Brothers	Paratrooper	Unknown episodes
2001	High Stakes	Charlie	Episode: "Father Figure"
2001	My Family	Tom	Episode: "All Roads Lead to Ramon"
2002	Lexx	Cleasby	Episode: "Prime Ridge"
2002	Paradise Heights	Toby Edwards	6 episodes
2002–2003	Rockface	Jamie Doughan	Series 1 & 2; 14 episodes
2003	Sons & Lovers	Paul Morel	Television film
2004	North & South	Frederick Hale	Mini-series; 3 episodes
2005	Fingersmith	"Gentleman"	Mini-series; 3 episodes
2005	ShakespeaRe-Told	Xander	Mini-series; episode: "A Midsummer Night's Dream"
2008	The Palace	King Richard IV	8 episodes
2009	Monday Monday	Michael	Episode: #1.7
2009	Emma	Frank Churchill	Mini-series; 3 episodes
2010	The Little House	Patrick	2 episodes
2012	Dark Matters: Twisted But True	Dr. Goldberger; Fritz Haber	Episode: "Amnesiac, Party Poopers, Risky Radiation". Episode: "Positively Poisonous, Beauty and Brains, Medusa's Heroin"
2012	World Without End	Godwyn	Mini-series; 8 episodes
2013	Agatha Christie's Poirot	Harold Waring	Episode: "The Labours of Hercules"
2013	Lucan	Dominick Elwes	2-part drama
2013–2014	The Village	Edmund Allingham	Series 1 & 2; 12 episodes
2014	Fleming: The Man Who Would Be Bond	Peter Fleming	Mini-series; 4 episodes
2014	Rogue	Elliott	Series 2; 7 episodes
2014	The Secrets	Tom	Mini-series; episode: "The Conversation"
2015–2018	The Man in the High Castle	Frank Frink	Series 1–3; 26 episodes
2018–2022	Charmed	Harry Greenwood	Series 1–4; 71 episodes. Also director on 3 episodes (Note: Credited as Rupert E.C. Evans)
2022	Bridgerton	Edmund Bridgerton, 8th Viscount Bridgerton	Episode: "A Bee in Your Bonnet”
2023	Black Cake	James Everett	Episode: "Mother"
2024	Wisting	Andrew Greenwood	Series 4; 4 episodes
2024	Moonflower Murders	John Spencer	Mini-series; 5 episodes
2025	Lynley	Hugh Larwood	Episode: "Careless in Red"
2025	Truth & Treason	Erwin Mussener	Mini-series; 4 episodes. Expanded version of the film of same name
2026	Gone	Rory Bowman	6 episodes

=== Video games ===
Year	Title	Role (voice)	Notes
2008	Haze	Sergeant Morgan Duvall / Additional voices	
2010	Enslaved: Odyssey to the West	Pyramid Ark Citizen	
2011	Q.U.B.E.	919	
2012	Fable: The Journey	Blaze	

== Theatre ==
Year	Title	Role	Director	Venue		Ref.
1999	Venetian Heat	Mario	Claudio Macor	Barons Court Theatre		
2003- 2004	Sweet Panic	Richard	Stephen Poliakoff	Duke of York's Theatre		
2005	Breathing Corpses	Charlie	Anna Mackmin	Royal Court Theatre		
2006-2007	Romeo & Juliet	Romeo	Nancy Meckler	Royal Shakespeare Theatre	Royal Shakespeare Company	
2006-2007	King John	Lewis the Dauphin	Josie Rourke	Royal Shakespeare Theatre	Royal Shakespeare Company	
2007	Kiss of the Spider Woman	Valentin	Charlie Westenra	Donmar Warehouse		
2012	Fear	Gerald	Dominic Savage	Bush Theatre		

== Awards and nominations ==
Year	Award	Category	Work	Result	Ref.
2014	Fright Meter Awards	Best Actor	The Canal	Nominated	
2015	Fantasporto	Best Actor	The Canal	Won	
