= Val Kane =

Irish Gaelic footballer

Personal information
- Native name: Val Mac Catháin (Irish)
- Born: Newry, County Down, Northern Ireland
- Occupation: Teacher
- Height: 5 ft 8 in (173 cm)

Sport
- Sport: Gaelic football
- Position: Midfield
Club
- Years: Club
- Newry Mitchells
Club titles
- Down titles: 2
Inter-county
- Years: County
- Down
Inter-county titles
- Ulster titles: 1
- All-Irelands: 1

Val Kane is a former Irish sportsperson who played Gaelic football for Down and soccer for Dundalk.

He is the brother of former Down captain D. J. Kane and father of actress Valene Kane.

== Gaelic football ==
As a schoolboy, Kane captained Abbey Christian Brothers' Grammar School to a MacRory Cup title.

Kane made his debut for the Down senior team in the Wembley Tournament in 1963. He was an unused sub when Down won the 1968 All-Ireland Senior Football Championship.

At club level, he was part of the Newry Mitchell's team which won the Down Senior Championship in 1967 and 1968.

In 1984, he was selected as one of the coaches for the GAA's Centenary School of Coaching. alongside Jim McKeever, Niall Moyna, Brendan Colleran, Mickey Whelan and Pat Spillane.

A schoolteacher by profession, Kane's first managerial victory came leading Abbey CBS to the 1970 Corn na nÓg.

He also served as the secretary of the Ulster Colleges GAA Council for 23 years.

== Soccer ==
Kane signed for Dundalk in November 1971 though later returned to playing amateur league football in Newry.
