= Michael Ryan (British actor) =

British actor

- Occupation: Actor
- Years active: 1998–present

Michael Ryan is a British actor.

== Filmography ==
Film
Year	Title	Role	Notes
1998	Innocent Party		Television film
1999	Dockers	Thomas Walton	Television film
2000	In His Life: The John Lennon Story	Rory Quinn	Television film
2002	Put Your Coat On	Man In Toilet	Short film
2002	Revengers Tragedy	Bomber	
2007	Wake	Matt	Short film
2007	Across the Universe	Phil	
2008	The Fridge		Short film
2008	RocknRolla	Pete	
2009	Contenders	Mr. Crowe	Short film
2009	Awaydays	Marty	
2010	Leave Taking		Short film
2011	War Horse	British Trench Soldier	
2012	Kelly + Victor	Pete Tucker	
2013	Vendetta	Griff	
2014	Serena	Coldfield	
2015	The Slain	Rigging	Short film

Television
Year	Title	Role	Notes
2003-2005	Dream Team	Dean Boyle	Main role
2004	Days That Shook the World	David Whitby	
2009-2020	Doctors	Haden Newell / Tom Hopkinson / Lester Coley / Andy Clark / PC Kevin Rodgers	7 episodes
2009	Moving On	Leo	1 episode
2009-2010	Hollyoaks	Caleb Ramsey	11 episodes
2014	WPC 56	Ned Garrett	3 episodes
2014	Lewis	Harrison Sax	2 episodes
2014	Foyle's War	Ian Hughes	1 episode
2016	Stan Lee's Lucky Man	Alan	1 episode
2017	Silent Witness	Wesley Beale	2 episodes
2017	The Arrangement	Andres Plank	1 episode
2018	The City and the City	Khurusch	1 episode
2018	Bulletproof	Boscoe	1 episode
2018	Bodyguard	Gun Dealer	1 episode
