= Dublin International Film Festival =

Annual film festival held in Dublin, Ireland

Coordinates: 53.350449°N 6.26707°W

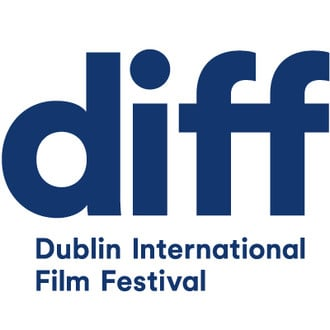
- Location: Dublin, Ireland
- Founded: 2003
- Most recent: 2025
- Festival date: February/March
- Language: English and others
- Website: diff.ie

The Dublin International Film Festival (DIFF; Irish: Féile Scannán Idirnáisiúnta Bhaile Átha Cliath) is an annual film festival that has been held in Dublin, Ireland, since 2003.

== History ==
The Dublin International Film Festival was established in 2003. It was revived by Michael Dwyer, international film critic and The Irish Times chief film correspondent, along with David McLoughlin, film producer. (The original Dublin Film Festival was founded in 1985 by Dwyer and journalist and broadcaster Myles Dungan.) McLoughlin joined while still an undergraduate in Trinity College Dublin. The festival was established to present an opportunity for Dublin's cinema-going audiences to experience the best in Irish and international cinema.

"Dublin has remarkable film attendance per capita, among the highest in Europe, certainly the highest in the EU," Dwyer said in a 2003 interview. "It seems absurd that the city didn't have an international film festival."

In the first year, the festival secured €25,000 in funding from the Arts Council of Ireland for planning purposes. The funds then increased to over €100,000. Jameson Irish Whiskey was the title sponsor of the festival, providing significant support for many years and backing the festival with a major marketing campaign; the festival was called the Jameson Dublin International Film Festival (JDIFF). The festival was also supported by partners such as The Irish Times, FM104, Conrad Hotel, Cineworld, McConnells, MSL Mercedes-Benz, Windmill Lane and Cine Electric. Other funders include the Irish Film Board, Dublin City Council, Fáilte Ireland and a number of cultural institutions, including the Goethe-Institut.

In 2007, the festival introduced a career achievement award, the Volta Award, to celebrate individuals who have made a significant contribution to the world of film. In the same year, the festival introduced the Audience Award recipients, which include Once and a surfing documentary, Waveriders.

In 2025, the festival was almost exclusively at the Light House Cinema, Smithfield. Past festival venues included the Screen Cinema, Hawkins Street; Cineworld, Parnell Street; the Savoy Cinema, O'Connell Street and the Irish Film Institute, Eustace Street. In 2008 Movies@Dundrum was used as a venue. In 2009 the Light House Cinema, Smithfield, was added as a venue.

2008 saw a significant change to the festival's executive roles: Gráinne Humphreys replaced Michael Dwyer as festival director, and Joanne O'Hagan assumed the role, formerly held by Rory Concannon, of chief executive officer. Dwyer assumed the position of chairman of the Dublin International Film Festival Board, and David McLoughlin stepped down.

Over 38,000 admissions were recorded for the 2008 festival for ticketed events. Non-ticketed events included a citywide installation—Dublin on Screen—to celebrate Dublin's cinematic heritage. The initiative featured films shot on location in Dublin and screened on the very spot they were shot on.

The festival is regarded as an important event for the cinema of Ireland, bringing together filmmakers, actors, producers and other celebrities from Ireland and around the world. The festival is committed to supporting film. In 2008, it initiated a significant International Screen Writing Award: Write Here, Write Now. The winner of the award was announced at the 2009 festival, which took place from 12 February to 22 February 2009.

In 2016, the original sponsors, Jameson Irish Whiskey, were replaced by Audi after thirteen years of sponsorship. The festival was then called the Audi Dublin International Film Festival (ADIFF). The new sponsorship deal lasted three years.

In 2018, Virgin Media Ireland committed to sponsoring the festival for three years, starting in 2019, and the festival was called the Virgin Media Dublin International Film Festival (VMDIFF). Since 2022, the festival has had no name sponsor.

== Awards ==
The festival introduced the Volta Awards in 2007. The award is named after Dublin's first cinema, the Volta Picture Theatre, established by author James Joyce in 1905. Awards are given for career achievement and audience favourite. Critics' awards were first presented in 2009. The Michael Dwyer Discovery Award' was created in 2010 after his death to honour Irish people working in film.

=== 2007 ===
- Career Achievement Awards:
  - Gabriel Byrne, actor
  - Brendan McCaul, film producer and distributor
  - Jeremy Thomas, producer
  - Consolata Boyle, costume designer
- Audience Award: Once

=== 2008 ===
The 2008 festival was held from 15 to 24 February 2008.

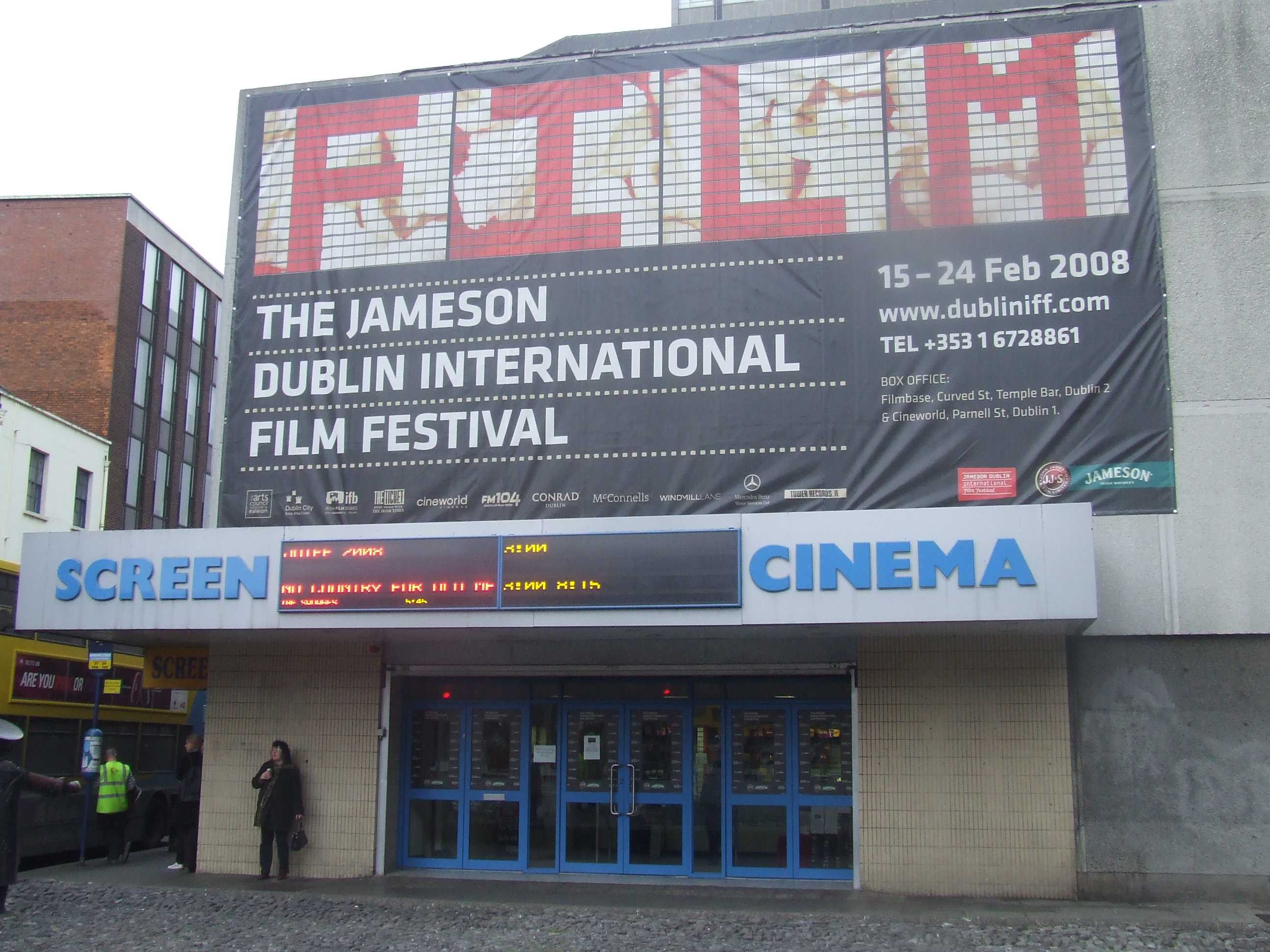
Screen Cinema decorated for the 2008 JDIFF

- Career Achievement Awards:
  - Brendan Gleeson, actor
  - Daniel Day-Lewis, actor
  - Leo Ward, cinema chain owner
- Audience Award: Waveriders

=== 2009 ===
- Career Achievement Awards:
  - Paolo Sorrentino, director
  - George Morrison, documentary maker
  - Thierry Frémaux, artistic director of the Cannes Film Festival
- Audience Award: Anvil! The Story of Anvil
- Critics' Awards:
  - Best Film: Let the Right One In
  - Best Irish Film: The Secret of Kells (a joint Irish-Belgian-French production)
  - Best Documentary: Anvil! The Story of Anvil
  - Best Director: Paolo Sorrentino (Il Divo)
  - Best Actor: Tom Hardy (Bronson)

=== 2010 ===
The 2010 festival was held from 18 to 28 February 2010.

Career Achievement Awards:

- Ciarán Hinds, actor
- Patricia Clarkson, actress
- Kristin Scott Thomas, actress

Audience Award: His & Hers

Dublin Film Critics Circle Awards:

- Best Film: Samson and Delilah
- Best Irish Film: The Fading Light
- Best Male Performance: Patrick O'Donnell (The Fading Light)
- Best Female Performance: Tilda Swinton (I Am Love)
- Best Director: Yorgos Lanthimos (Dogtooth)
- Best Documentary: His & Hers
- Special Jury Prize: Bad Lieutenant: Port of Call New Orleans
- Michael Dwyer Discovery Award: Kate McCullough, cinematographer (His and Hers)

=== 2011 ===
The 2011 festival was held from 17 to 27 February 2011.

Career Achievement Awards:

- Martin Sheen, actor
- Kevin Brownlow, film historian and preservationist
- François Ozon, director

Audience Award: Benda Bilili!

Dublin Film Critics Circle Awards:

- Best Film: The Robber
- Best Irish Film: Snap
- Best Director: Alexei Popogrebski (How I Ended This Summer)
- Best Irish Director: Carmel Winters (Snap)
- Best Cinematography: Tim Fleming (As If I Am Not There)
- Best Screenplay: Tudor Voican (Medal of Honor)
- Best Short: Small Change
- Best International Documentary: Cave of Forgotten Dreams
- Best Irish Documentary: Men of Arlington
- Best Début: Philip Koch (Picco)
- Best Actor: Jakob Cedergren (Submarino)
- Best Actress: Martina Gusman (Carancho)
- Special Jury Prize: The Four Times
- Michael Dwyer Discovery Award: Still Films

=== 2012 ===
Volta Awards:

- Stellan Skarsgård, actor
- Marin Karmitz, director, producer, distributor and cinema chain owner
- Al Pacino, actor

Audience Award: The Raid: Redemption

Dublin Film Critics Circle Awards:

- Best Film: The Raid: Redemption
- Best Irish Film: Nuala: A Life and Death
- Best Actor: Michael Fuith (Michael)
- Best Actress: Greta Gerwig (Damsels in Distress)
- Best Screenplay: Joseph Cedar (Footnote)
- Best Director: Nuri Bilge Ceylan (Once Upon a Time in Anatolia)
- Best Documentary: Samsara
- Michael Dwyer Discovery Award: Eoghan Mac Giolla Bhríde for Silence

=== 2013 ===
The 2013 festival ran from 14 to 24 February.

Volta Career Achievement Awards:

- Danny DeVito, actor and director
- Tim Roth, actor
- Costa-Gavras, director
- Joss Whedon, screenwriter and director
- Ennio Morricone

The Dublin Film Critics Circle selected the following winners:

- Best Film: Vanishing Waves by Kristina Buožytė
- Best Director: Mikhail Segal for Short Stories
- Best Actor: Aleksey Vertkov for White Tiger
- Best Actress: Dilan Aksüt, Night of Silence
- Best Debut: Maja Miloš for Klip
- Best Screenplay: Oriol Paulo and Lara Sendim for The Body
- Best Cinematography: Oleg Mutu for Beyond the Hills
- Best Documentary: Far Out Isn't Far Enough: The Tomi Ungerer Story
- Best Irish Feature: Babygirl by Macdara Vallelly
- Best Irish Documentary: Get the Picture by Cathy Pearson
- Michael Dwyer Discovery Award: Broken Song by Claire Dix
- Audience Award: Broken Song

Jury Prizes were awarded to:

- Blancanieves
- After Lucia
- The King of Pigs

=== 2014 ===
The 2014 festival ran from 13 to 23 February.

Volta Career Achievement Awards:

- Terry Gilliam, actor and director
- Peter Morgan, screenwriter
- Richard Dreyfuss, actor
- Stanley Tucci, actor

The Dublin Film Critics Circle selected the following winners:

- Best Film: The Reunion by Anna Odell
- Best Director: Paweł Pawlikowski for Ida
- Best Actor: Jack O'Connell for Starred Up
- Best Actress: Mira Barkhammar, Mira Grosin and Liv LeMoyne for We Are the Best!
- Best Debut Feature: The Rocket by Kim Mordaunt
- Best Screenplay: Georg Mass for Two Lives
- Best Cinematography: Daniel Landin for Under the Skin
- Best Documentary: Los Wild Ones by Elise Salomon
- Best Irish Feature: Love Eternal by Brendan Muldowney
- Best Irish Documentary: Living in a Coded Land by Pat Collins
- Michael Dwyer Discovery Award: Out of Here by Donal Foreman
- Audience Award: Los Wild Ones

Jury Prizes were awarded to:

- Blue Ruin
- The Golden Dream
- The Congress

=== 2015 ===
Special guest Ryan O'Neal shares about the festival in 2015

The 2015 festival ran from 19 to 29 March.

Volta Career Achievement Awards:

- Kenneth Branagh, actor and director
- Laurent Cantet, director and screenwriter
- Julie Andrews, actress

The Dublin Film Critics Circle selected the following winners:

- Best Film: The Tribe, director Myroslav Slaboshpytskiy
- Best Director: Ruben Östlund for Force Majeure
- Best Screenplay: Yuri Bykov for The Fool
- Best Cinematography: Lyle Vincent for A Girl Walks Home Alone at Night
- Best Documentary: Kurt Cobain: Montage of Heck, director Brett Morgen
- Best Actor: Cliff Curtis for The Dark Horse
- Best Actress: Nina Hoss for Phoenix
- Best Irish Feature: Glassland, director Gerard Barrett
- Best Irish Documentary: Wheel of Fortune: The Story and Legacy of the Fairview Lion Tamer, director Joe Lee
- Best Debut: Chaitanya Tamhane for Court
- Michael Dwyer Discovery Award: Piers McGrail, cinematographer on Glassland, Let Us Prey, The Canal

Audience Awards went to:

- Feature: The Salt of the Earth
- Short: Boogaloo and Graham

Special Jury Prizes were awarded to:

- A Pigeon Sat on a Branch Reflecting on Existence
- Eden
- You're Sleeping, Nicole
- 10,000 km

=== 2016 ===
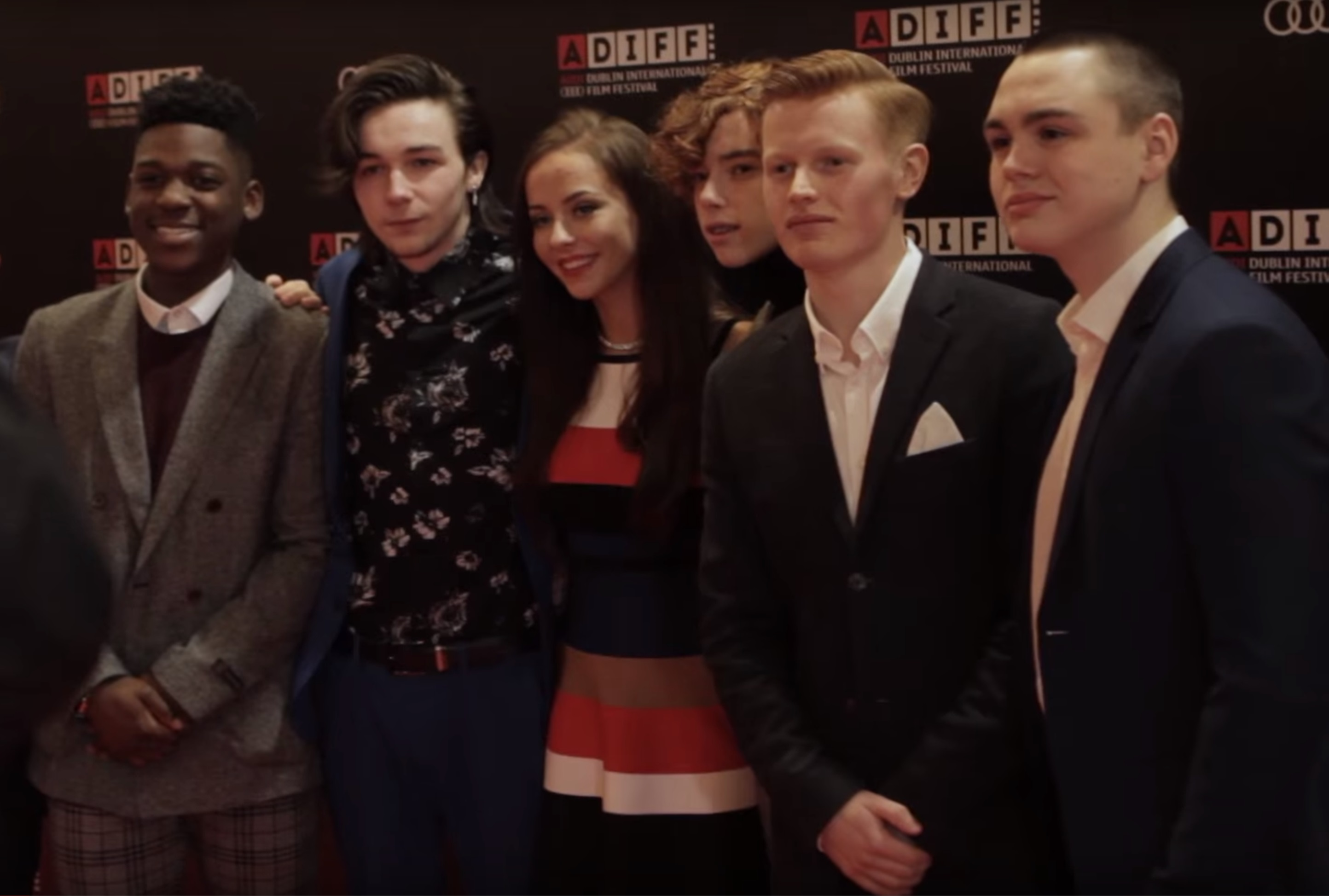
Cast of Sing Street at the 2016 Dublin International Film Festival. Left to right: Percy Chamburuka, Mark McKenna, Kelly Thornton, Ben Carolan, Karl Rice, Conor Hamilton.

The 2016 festival ran from 18 to 28 February.

Volta Career Achievement Awards:

- Angela Lansbury, actress and singer
- Claudia Cardinale, actress
- Andrew Stanton, director, screenwriter, producer and voice actor

The Dublin Film Critics Circle selected the following winners:

- Best Film: Mustang, director Deniz Gamze Ergüven
- Best Director: Lucile Hadžihalilović for Evolution
- Best Screenplay: Jaco Van Dormael and Thomas Gunzig for The Brand New Testament
- Best Cinematography: Mátyás Erdély for Son of Saul
- Best Documentary: Heart of a Dog, director Laurie Anderson
- Best Actor: Alex Lawther for Departure
- Best Actress: Monica Bellucci for Ville-Marie
- Best Ensemble Cast: Green Room, director Jeremy Saulnier
- Best Irish Feature: Viva, director Paddy Breathnach
- Best Irish Documentary: Atlantic, director Risteard Ó Domhnaill
- Best Irish Short Film: Geist, director Eric Daniel Dunn
- Best International Short Film: The Bathtub, director Tim Ellrich
- George Byrne Maverick Award: Stephen Rea for Viva
- Michael Dwyer Discovery Award: Ferdia Walsh-Peelo, actor on Sing Street

AUDI-ence Awards went to:

- Feature: Viva
- Short: Little Bear

Special Jury Prizes were awarded to:

- Black Mountain Poets
- Victoria
- Anomalisa

ADIFF Discovery Awards went to:

- Barry Keoghan, actor on Mammal, Traders and The Break
- Jack O'Shea, director/animator on A Coat Made Dark and Eat the Danger
- Kathryn Kennedy, producer on My Name Is Emily, It's Not Yet Dark and After

=== 2017 ===
The festival ran from 16 to 26 February.

Volta Career Achievement Awards:

- Vanessa Redgrave, actress

The Dublin Film Critics' Circle selected the following winners:

- Best Film – Aquarius, director Kleber Mendonça Filho
- Best Actress – Florence Pugh, Lady Macbeth
- Best Actor – Sherwan Haji, The Other Side of Hope
- Best Director – Lav Diaz, The Woman Who Left
- Best Cinematography – M. David Mullen, The Love Witch
- Best Screenplay – Kristina Grozeva, Petar Valchanov, Glory
- Best Irish Feature – Handsome Devil, director John Butler
- Best Irish Documentary – The Farthest, director Emer Reynolds
- Best Documentary – I Am Not Your Negro, director Raoul Peck
- George Byrne Maverick Award: Emer Reynolds, editor

Special Jury Prizes were awarded to:

- Kristopher Avedisian, Donald Cried
- Daouda Coulibaly, Wulu
- My Life as a Courgette
- The Transfiguration

AUDI-ence Award:

- The Farthest, director Emer Reynolds

ADIFF Discovery Awards went to:

- John Connors, actor on The Secret Scripture and Breathe
- Niamh Algar, actor on Without Name, Pebbles and Gone
- Vincent Gallagher, writer/director on Second to None and Love is a Sting

=== 2018 ===
The festival began on 22 February. Its ending was extended to 12 March due to the "Beast from the East" snowstorm.

Volta Career Achievement Award:

- Paul Schrader, writer and director
- Vanessa Redgrave (missed 2017 ceremony due to illness)

The Dublin Film Critics Circle selected the following winners:

- Best Film: Custody, director Xavier Legrand
- Best Director: Chloé Zhao for The Rider
- Best Irish Director: Rebecca Daly for Good Favour
- Best Screenplay: Lynne Ramsay for You Were Never Really Here
- Best Cinematography: Monika Lenczewska for Under the Tree
- Best Actor: Charlie Plummer for Lean on Pete
- Best Actress: Charlotte Rampling for Hannah
- Best Documentary: So Help Me God (Ni juge, ni soumise), director Yves Hinant
- Best Irish Film: The Lonely Battle of Thomas Reid, director Feargal Ward
- Michael Dwyer Discovery Award: Coralie Fargeat, director-writer on Revenge
- George Byrne Maverick Award: Stephen Rea, actor in Black 47
- Extraordinary Achievement: Bill Morrison, writer-director-editor of Dawson City: Frozen Time

Jury Prizes were awarded to:

- Kathleen Hepburn for Never Steady, Never Still
- Warwick Thornton for Sweet Country
- Liu Jian for Have a Nice Day
- Ryan Killackey for Yasuni Man

ADIFF Discovery Awards went to:

- Mia Mullarkey, director of Mother & Baby
- Rua Meegan and Trevor Whelan, directors of Bordalo II: A Life of Waste
- TJ O'Grady Peyton, director of Wave
  - Special Mention: Jessie Buckley

Short film awards:

- Best Irish Short Film: Mother & Baby, director Mia Mullarkey
  - Special Mention: Time Traveller, director Steve Kenny
- Best International Short Film: Retouch, director Kaveh Mazaheri
  - Special Mention: Mary Mother, director Sadam Wahidi

AUDI-ence Awards went to:

- Feature: The Breadwinner
- Short: Time Traveller

Fantastic Flix Children's Jury Awards

- Feature: Room 213
- Short: Earthy Encounters

=== 2019 ===
Virgin Media Ireland was the sponsor for the 2019 festival, which was held 20 February – 3 March.

Volta Awards:

- Ralph Fiennes, actor-director
- Sean Bailey, producer

Short film awards:

- Best Irish Short Film: Five Letters to the Stranger Who Will Dissect My Brain, director Oonagh Kearney
  - Special Mention: The First was a Boy, director Shaun Dunne
- Best International Short Film: Inanimate, director Lucia Bulgheroni
  - Special Mention: Child, director Joren Molter

Audience Awards went to:

- Feature: Maiden, director Alex Holmes
- Short: 99 Problems, director Ross Killeen

Discovery Awards went to:

- Alexandra McGuinness, writer-director of She's Missing
- Ian Hunt Duffy, director of Low Tide
- Oonagh Kearney, director of Five Letters to the Stranger Who Will Dissect My Brain
- Madonna Bambino, makeup artist on Low Tide

Virgin Media Dublin International Film Festival Documentary prize:

- Winner: Of Fathers and Sons, director Talal Derki
- Honourable mention: GAZA, directors Garry Keane and Andrew McConnell

Dublin Human Rights Film Award:

- Winner: Heartbound: A Different Kind of Love Story, director Janus Metz Pedersen
- Special mention: Land Without God, directors Gerard Mannix Flynn, Maedhbh McMahon and Lotta Petronella

Children's Jury Awards:

- Feature – Winner: Mia and the White Lion, director Gilles de Maistre
- Feature – Special Mention: Departures, director Peter Hutchings
- Short – Winner: First Disco, director Helen M. O'Reilly
- Feature – Special Mention: The Overcoat, directors Meelis Arulepp and Sean Mullen

Young Programmer's Choice Award:

- Winner: Rafiki, director Wanuri Kahiu
- Special Mention: Ballon, director Michael Herbig

The Dublin Film Critics Circle selected the following winners:

- Best Film: Transit, director Christian Petzold
- Best Director: Rima Das for Bulbul Can Sing
- Best Cinematography: Hiroshi Okuyama for Jesus
- Best Documentary: GAZA, directors Garry Keane and Andrew McConnell
- Best Irish Film: Greta, director Neil Jordan
- Best Screenplay: Bai Xue for The Crossing
- Best Actor: Bogdan Dumitrache for Pororoca
- Best Actress: Jessie Buckley for Wild Rose
- Jury Prizes
  - Jia Zhangke, director of Ash Is Purest White
  - Alex Ross Perry, writer-director-producer of Her Smell
  - Baran Kosari, actress in Cold Sweat (La Permission)
  - Hu Bo, director-writer-editor of An Elephant Sitting Still
  - Bo Burnham, writer-director of Eighth Grade
- George Byrne Maverick Award: Hugh O'Conor, director of Metal Heart
- Michael Dwyer Discovery Award: Dianne Lucille Campbell, director of El Hor

=== 2020 ===
The 2020 festival took place between 26 February and 8 March.

Volta Awards:

- Charlie Kaufman, writer and director
- Trine Dyrholm, actress and singer

Audience Awards:

- Virgin Media Audience Award: Endless Sunshine on a Cloudy Day (dir. John Connors)
- Virgin Media Audience Award, Short Film: Iarscoláire (dir. Shaun Dunne)
- Fantastic Flix Audience Award: Onward
- Fantastic Flix Audience Award, Short Film: The Girl at the End of the Garden

Aer Lingus Discovery Awards:

- Paddy Slattery, writer/director of Broken Law
- Cara Holmes, director of Welcome to a Bright White Limbo
- Claire Byrne, director of Sister This
- Dónall Ó Héalaí, actor in Arracht

Documentary Competition:

- Special mention: Women Make Film: A New Road Trip Through Cinema
- Winner: Confucian Dream, director Mijie Li

Short Film Awards, supported by Griffith College:

- Special Mention International Short Film: Adnan
- Best International Short Film: Quiet Land Good People
- Special Mention, Irish Short Film : Innocent Boy, dir. John Connors
- Best Irish Short Film: Welcome to a Bright White Limbo, dir. Cara Holmes

Irish Council for Civil Liberties Human Rights Film Award:

- Special Mention: Street Leagues, dir. Daniel F. Holmes
- Winner: Herself, dir. Phyllida Lloyd

Lifetime Contribution Award: Liam Cunningham, actor

Fantastic Flix Jury Awards, as chosen by The Ark's Children's Jury:

- Feature Film: Onward
- Short Film: Streets of Fury, dir. Aidan McAteer

Dublin Film Critics' Circle Awards:

- Best Film: Supernova
- Best Actor: Albano Jeronimo (The Domain)
- Best Actress: Barbara Sukowa (Deux)
- Best Screenplay: Teng Congcong (Send Me to the Clouds)
- Best Director: Roy Andersson (About Endlessness)
- Best Cinematography: Leonardo Simões (Vitalina Varela)
- Best Ensemble: Rocks
- Best Irish Film: Arracht
- George Byrne Maverick Award: Pat Murphy
- Best Documentary: New York Our Time
- Michael Dwyer Discovery Award: Clare Dunne
- Jury Prizes: Moffie; Marona's Fantastic Tale; Deerskin; If You Are Happy

=== 2021 ===
The 2021 festival took place during 3–14 March.

Dublin Film Critics' Circle Awards:

- Best Film: Apples
- Best Actor: Goran Bogdan (Father)
- Best Actress: Joanna Scanlan (After Love)
- Best Screenplay: Lee Isaac Chung (Minari)
- Best Director: Lili Horvát (Preparations to be Together for an Unknown Period of Time)
- Best Cinematography: Viktor Kossakovsky/Egil Håskjold Larsen (Gunda)
- Best Irish Film: Tadhg O'Sullivan (To The Moon)
- George Byrne Maverick Award: Ivan Kavanagh
- Best Documentary: Acasă, My Home
- Michael Dwyer Discovery Award: Zofia Stafiej (I Never Cry)
- Jury Prizes:
  - Kyle Gallner, actor in Dinner in America
  - Noah Hutton, writer-director of Lapsis
  - Zoé Wittock, director of Jumbo
  - Bryan Fogel, director-producer of The Dissident

=== 2022 ===
The 2022 festival took place from 23 February to 6 March. Adam McKay received the Volta Award.

- Best Director: Laura Samani, Small Body
- Best Screenplay: Terence Davies, Benediction
- Best Actress: Anamaria Vartolomei, Happening
- Best Actor: Udo Kier, Swan Song
- Best Debut Feature: Blerta Basholli, Hive
- Best Editor: Sean Baker, Red Rocket
- Best Cinematography: Frédéric Noirhomme, Playground
- Best Ensemble: Róise & Frank
- Best Documentary: Maisie
- Best Irish Documentary: Vicky
- Special Jury Prize: Cannon Arm and the Arcade Quest
- George Byrne Maverick Award: Tristan Heanue (Harvest – short)
- Michael Dwyer Discovery Award: Kelly Campbell (An Encounter – short)

=== 2023 ===
The 2023 festival took place from 23 February to 4 March. Actress Emily Watson received the Volta Award.

Dublin Film Critics Circle Awards 2023

- Best Film: The Beasts
- Best Director: Léa Mysius – The Five Devils
- Best Screenplay: Cristian Mungiu – R.M.N.
- Best Actress: Kristine Kujath Thorp – Sick of Myself
- Best Actor: Eden Dambrine – Close
- Best Debut Feature: Victim – Michal Blasko
- Best Editor: Nico Leunen – The Eight Mountains
- Best Cinematography: Marine Altan – Thunder
- Best Score: Nadah El Shazly – The Damned Don't Cry
- Best Ensemble: How to Blow Up a Pipeline
- Best Documentary: Kanaval: A People’s History of Haiti
- Best Irish Film: My Sailor, My Love
- Best Irish Documentary: 406 Days
- George Byrne Maverick Award: Mark Cousins
- Michael Dwyer Discovery Award: Zara Devlin
- Best Irish Short: Lamb – Sinead O’Loughlin
- Best International Short: Will You Look at Me – Huang Shuli
- Volta Award: Emily Watson

=== 2024 ===
The 2024 festival took place from 22 February to March 2.

- Volta Award: Isabelle Huppert and Steve McQueen
- Best Director: Alan Friel, Woken

=== 2025 ===
The 2025 festival took place from 20 February to March 2.

DIFF Awards

- Audience award feature: A Want In Her
- Audience award short: Naked Lights
- Discovery award: Cara Loftus, Clare Monnelly and Albert Hooi
- Best documentary award: A Want In Her
- Avalon World Cinema award: Santosh
- International Short Film award: The Man Who Would Not Remain Silent
- Animated Short Film award: Inside, The Valley Sings
- Sue Bruce-Smith Irish Short Film: Trasna na Líne
- Irish Council for Civil Liberties Human Rights Film Award: Testimony

Dublin Film Critics Circle Awards

- Best film On Falling, directed by Laura Carreira
- Best director Maura Delpero, for Vermiglio
- Best editing Ramon Zürcher, for The Sparrow in the Chimney
- Best actress Shahana Goswami, for Santosh
- Best actor Albrecht Schuch, for Peacock
- Best ensemble Backstage, directed by Afef Ben Mahmoud and Khalil Benkirane
- Best documentary Riefenstahl, directed by Andres Veiel
- Best cinematography Sverre Sørdal, for Sister Midnight
- Best debut Good One, directed by India Donaldson
- Best screenplay Tracie Laymon, for Bob Trevino Likes It
- Michael Dwyer discovery Ruby Conway Dunne, Molly Byrne and Alicia Weafer, for Ready or Not
- George Byrne maverick Carrie Crowley
- Best Irish film Beat the Lotto, directed by Ross Whittaker
- Best Irish documentary Born That Way, directed by Éamon Little
- Special jury prize Latina Latina, directed by Adrian Duncan
- Volta Award: Jessica Lange and Ed Harris

== See also ==
- Cinema of Ireland
- Cineworld Dublin
- Screen Cinema
- Savoy Cinema
- Irish Film Institute
