= Assimilate =

2019 American science fiction horror film

- Film poster
- Directed by: John Murlowski
- Written by: John Murlowski; Steven Palmer Peterson
- Produced by: William Fay; John Murlowski
- Starring: Joel Courtney; Andi Matichak; Calum Worthy; Cam Gigandet; Mason McNulty
- Cinematography: Damian Horan
- Edited by: Jason Schmid
- Music by: Sven Faulconer
- Production companies: Boy Meets Girl Productions; Sprockefeller Pictures; Maple Island Films; WeatherVane Productions
- Distributed by: Gravitas Ventures
- Release date: May 24, 2019 (limited)
- Running time: 93 minutes
- Country: United States
- Language: English

Assimilate is a 2019 American science fiction horror film directed by John Murlowski and starring Joel Courtney, Andi Matichak, and Calum Worthy also with Mason McNulty and Cam Gigandet.

== Plot ==
Zach and Randy are two kids who run a YouTube channel dedicated to exploring their fictitious town of Multon in Missouri. However, they do not get as many views as they expect to, due to the fact that their town has nothing interesting going on. Zach is in love with a girl named Kayla, a lacrosse player over at the local high school, but she only regards him as a friend, she is concerned over soon having to study overseas as it means leaving her younger brother Joey since their parents do not have any time for him. During the day, Zach and Randy meet a neighbor, Ms. Bisette, who is concerned about a strange bug moving in an unnatural, synchronized pattern on her apples. They then notice a boy being dragged by his arm by his mother who the boy is screaming (to onlookers) that this woman is not his mother. But he is ignored on the basis he is just acting out.

One night, Zach and Randy hear screaming from Ms. Bisette's house, and when they go in, she screams that something bit her. However, the next day Ms. Bisette claims that nothing happened when questioned by Deputy Josh Haywood. Zach and Randy begin to see disturbing events unfold the next day, with the pastor and sheriff acting emotionless. However, Haywood dismisses the claims, telling the two not to cause any more trouble.

Outside, they run into Kayla, who is worried about the erratic behavior of her parents. Their suspicions are confirmed when Zach witnesses a bug running around the attic, with Kayla's mom's body in a hamper. However, Haywood finds nothing during a search the next day. Around that time, Kayla's mom comes, but also displays the same emotionless behavior. With no other choice, Zach, Randy, and Kayla leave, leaving behind Kayla's now clearly distressed younger brother Joey, greatly upsetting Kayla. The three go to Zach's farmhouse, where they see Zach's dad, an amputee, but he oddly gets up from his wheelchair, having been replaced by a copycat. The townspeople surround Zach and Randy and lock them in the farmhouse, putting two ice coolers in front of them. Zach then witnesses his mom being killed and "assimilated" by the bug. Luckily, Zach and Randy escape and with Kayla's help, run to Haywood's RV. By now, Haywood has begun to believe Zach and Randy, having killed his double. The four plan to radio the National Guard and send someone in, but the townspeople swarm the RV. In the ensuing chaos, Haywood is dragged out of the window and killed, and Randy leads the assimilated away as a distraction while Zach and Kayla run.

Kayla explains that there is a flower shop van that could serve as an escape vehicle. In order to reach it, they display the same emotions as the copies, fooling the doubles. They pass by the burned corpses of the townspeople, and Zach manages to get the keys. However, Kayla witnesses a process in which the kids are coerced by their parents to be bitten and copied. Kayla poses as a copy and finds Joey, but a single tear is seen by a copy and exposes her ruse. Zach is able to grab Kayla, but Joey runs off to a family cabin in the woods (Kayla having instructed him to). In the forest, Zach finds Randy, but it is revealed that Randy was killed and replaced with a copycat, and Kayla and Zach are forced to drown the copy. Zach makes a plan to upload another one of his vlogs to YouTube, hoping to tell the world what is happening. However, since both Zach and Kayla were bitten by the bugs earlier, their copies come to kill them. Zach and Kayla fend off their clones by flooding the room with carbon dioxide (distracting them with images on the monitors), suffocating them, and they are able to upload the vlog onto YouTube.

The two run into the woods into the cabin, where they find Joey staring at the TV screen, having escaped with both Kayla and Joey cuddling each other for comfort as they weep over being orphaned. In a reveal through TV displays, Zach and Kayla watch in horror as feeds from Washington, D.C., Beijing, Agra, Paris, London, New York and Tokyo show copies burning the corpses of dead humans and walking in the same emotionless state as previously seen. Zach, Kayla, and Joey realize their town was among the last to be hit by the copies.

The final scene shows the YouTube video comment section, where it is revealed that multiple people are still alive in different cities of the world, specifically Boston, Nanjing and Prague. However, the state of the Earth is unknown, with the copies now outnumbering the humans.

== Cast ==
- Joel Courtney as Zach Henderson
- Calum Worthy as Randy Foster
- Andi Matichak as Kayla Shepard
- Mason McNulty as Joey Shepard
- Katherine McNamara as Hannah
- Cam Gigandet as Deputy Josh Haywood
- Terry Dale Parks as Pastor Greg
- Kyler Porche as Dylan

== Reception ==
On Rotten Tomatoes, the film has an approval rating of 56% based on nine reviews, with an average rating of 4.5/10.

Noel Murray of the Los Angeles Times wrote: "there’s nothing especially original about Assimilate. But director John Murlowski and a talented young cast … do at least keep the action lively and unpretentious."
