= Shazad Latif =

British actor (born 1988)

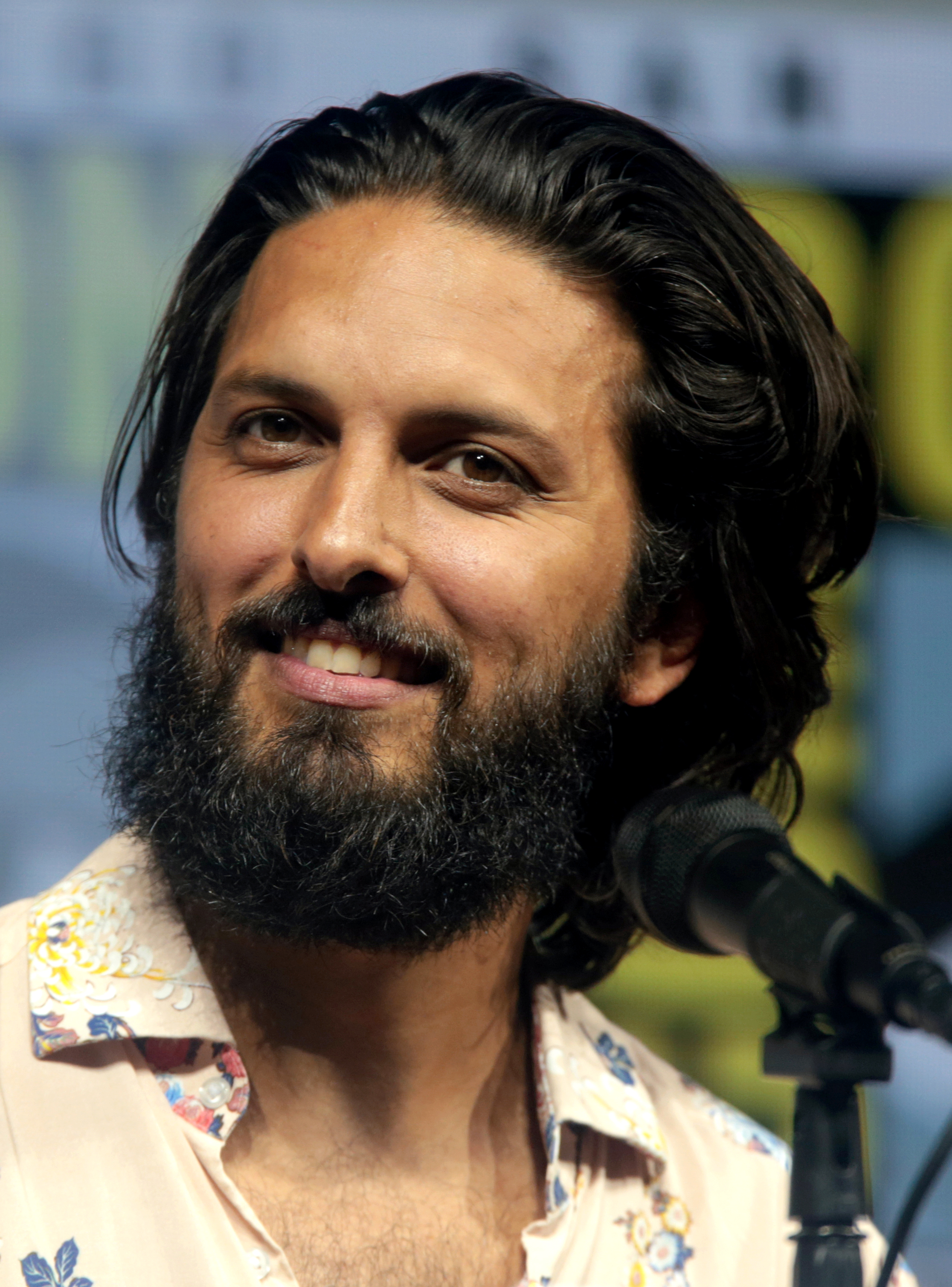
- Latif at San Diego Comic-Con in 2018
- Born: 8 July 1988 (age 38); London, England
- Other name: Javid Iqbal
- Occupation: Actor
- Years active: 2009–present

Shazad Latif (né Iqbal; 8 July 1988) is a British actor. He has starred in the TV series Spooks as Tariq Masood, in Toast of London as Clem Fandango, in Penny Dreadful as Dr. Jekyll and Mr. Hyde, in Star Trek: Discovery as Chief of Security Ash Tyler, and in Nautilus as Captain Nemo.

== Early life ==
Born in London with the surname Iqbal, Latif is of mixed Pakistani, English and Scottish descent. His father was Javed Iqbal and his paternal family is Pakistani, specifically Punjabi, from Jhelum in Punjab, Pakistan, with one grandfather originally from Rajasthan. His mother is mixed English and Scottish. He grew up in Tufnell Park, North London. He studied at the Bristol Old Vic Theatre School and performed in many stage productions, including King Lear, playing Cornwall, and Richard Sheridan's comedy School for Scandal, as Joseph Surface. He left the school a year early to take up his role in Spooks.

== Career ==
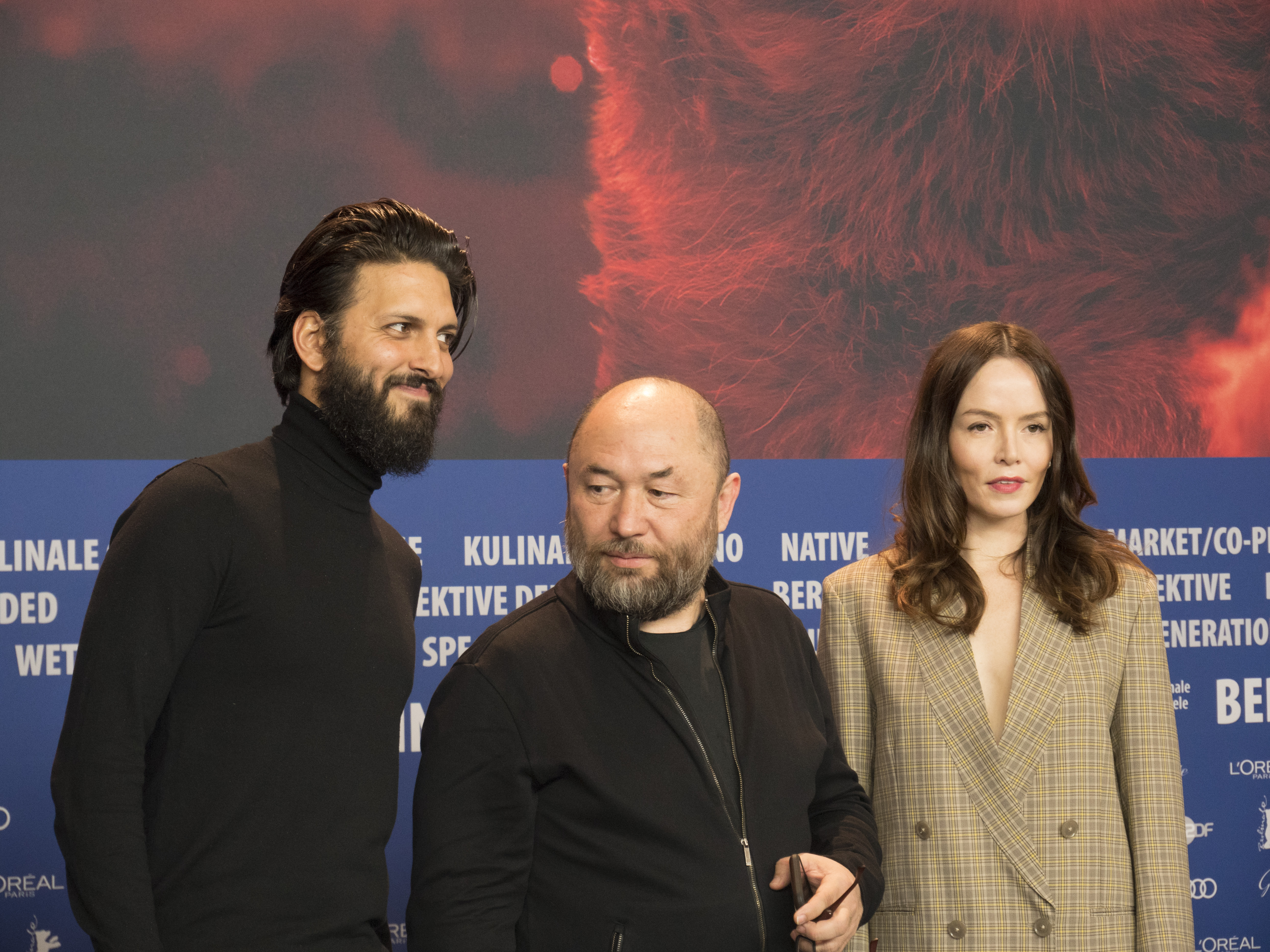
Shazad Latif, Timur Bekmambetov, Valene Kane at the press conference of Profile at Berlinale 2018

Spooks was his first major role on television, as the highly skilled technician and data analyst Tariq Masood. He appeared in all series of Toast of London as the recurring character Clem Fandango, one of the studio staff recording the voice of lead character Steven Toast (Matt Berry).

In 2016, he joined the cast of Penny Dreadful as the literary character Dr. Jekyll.

In 2017, Latif was cast in the role of Lieutenant Ash Tyler in Star Trek: Discovery. After initially being announced as playing a human, it was later revealed that Latif had also portrayed the Klingon Voq in the series, credited under his late father's name to conceal a related plot twist.

Shazad Latif played ISIS fighter Bilel in the 2018 thriller film Profile by Timur Bekmambetov. The film takes place entirely on computer screens. It premiered at the 68th Berlin International Film Festival where it won the Panorama Audience Award.

Latif played Captain Nemo in the series Nautilus, released on Amazon Prime Video in 2024.

== Filmography ==
=== Film ===
| Year | Title | Role | Notes |
|---|---|---|---|
| 2015 | The Man Who Knew Infinity | Chandra Mahalanobis | |
| 2015 | The Second Best Exotic Marigold Hotel | Kushal | |
| 2018 | The Commuter | Vince | |
| 2018 | Profile | Bilel | |
| 2021 | Falling for Figaro | Charlie | |
| 2022 | What's Love Got to Do with It? | Kaz | |
| 2022 | Rogue Agent | Sonny Chandra | |
| 2024 | Magpie | Ben | |
| 2026 | Wuthering Heights | Edgar Linton | |

=== Television ===
| Year | Title | Role | Notes |
|---|---|---|---|
| 2009–2011 | Spooks | Tariq Masood | 17 episodes |
| 2010 | The Silence | Yousef | 3 episodes |
| 2011 | Fresh Meat | Riz | Episode: "#1.2" |
| 2011 | Comedy Lab | Bobby | Episode: "Kadadaasses" |
| 2011 | Black Mirror | Mehdi Raboud | Episode: "The National Anthem" |
| 2012 | Silk | Ibrahim Ali | Episode: "#2.5" |
| 2013 | My Mad Fat Diary | Dr. Nick Kassar | 5 episodes |
| 2013 | Jo | Nasser | Episode: "The Opera" |
| 2013 | Love Matters | Satpal | Episode: "A Nice Arrangement" |
| 2013–2015 | Toast of London | Clem Fandango | 16 episodes |
| 2014 | Salting the Battlefield | Jez Nichols | Television film |
| 2015 | Ordinary Lies | Rick O'Connor | 4 episodes |
| 2016 | Penny Dreadful | Dr. Henry Jekyll | 8 episodes |
| 2017 | Still Star-Crossed | Tybalt Capulet | 1 episode |
| 2017–2019 | Star Trek: Discovery | Ash Tyler/Voq | 20 episodes |
| 2019 | Departure | Ali | 6 episodes |
| 2019 | The Dark Crystal: Age of Resistance | Kylan (voice) | 5 episodes |
| 2021 | The Pursuit of Love | Alfred Wincham | 3 episodes |
| 2022 | Toast of Tinseltown | Clem Fandango | 5 episodes |
| 2024 | Nautilus | Captain Nemo | Main role |
| 2025 | Atomic | JJ | Main role |
