= The Fading Light =

- Directed by: Ivan Kavanagh
- Written by: Ivan Kavanagh
- Starring: Valene Kane; Emma Eliza Regan; Bibi Larrson; Patrick O'Donnell
- Production companies: Irish Film Board; Park Films
- Release date: 1 November 2009
- Running time: 71 minutes
- Country: Ireland
- Language: English
- Budget: €100,000

The Fading Light is a 2009 Irish film directed by Ivan Kavanagh which won Best Irish Film and Best Actor at the Jameson Dublin International Film Festival 2010.

The cast includes Valene Kane, Emma Eliza Regan, Bibi Larrson and Patrick O’Donnell who won the Best Actor gong from the Dublin Film Critics Circle for his performance in the film

The film has a limited release at Dublin's IFI from 12 March 2010
