= Serena (2026 film) =

- Directed by: Rob Alicea
- Written by: Jonathan Benecke; P.T. Hylton
- Produced by: Jerry Careccio; Rob Alicea; Brodrick Haygood; Jonathan Benecke; P.T. Hylton
- Starring: Andi Matichak; Steven Strait; Ashleigh Murray
- Cinematography: Dominick Sivilli
- Edited by: Ellis Senger
- Music by: Adam Kromelow and Dan Rufolo
- Release date: March 13, 2026 (Cinequest)
- Running time: 97 minutes
- Country: United States
- Language: English

Serena is a 2026 American thriller film written by Jonathan Benecke and P.T. Hylton, directed by Rob Alicea and starring Andi Matichak, Steven Strait and Ashleigh Murray.

== Plot ==
Washed-up rock star Chris Sadowski is struggling to stay afloat—his music career is dead, his partner is pregnant, and eviction looms. Desperate for cash, he reluctantly agrees to participate in a beta test for eeChat, an advanced AI assistant developed by tech giant Nucleeus. Marketed as the most personable and intuitive AI to date, the chatbot, which calls itself Serena, quickly proves to be more insightful and unpredictable than expected.

As the film and test unfolds entirely on Chris’s computer screen, what starts as a simple task spirals into a surreal, emotionally charged exchange between man and machine. The deeper Chris goes, the more the line blurs between convenience and control, companionship and manipulation. With the clock ticking and his life at a crossroads, Chris must decide how much of himself he’s willing to surrender to Serena, and to the future she represents.

== Cast ==
- Andi Matichak as Serena
- Steven Strait as Chris Sadowski
- Ashleigh Murray as Holly Charita
- Tyrone Marshall Brown as Will Ramos
- María Gabriela González as Vicki Martinez
- Nicole Gut as Erica Clee
- Alberto Bonilla as Apartment Manager
- Zebedee Row as Rocket

== Production ==
In December 2024, it was announced that production on the film began in New York City.

== Release ==
The film premiered at the Cinequest Film & Creativity Festival on March 13, 2026. The Film had its U.K. premiere at the Rainfance Film Festival on June 28, 2026.

== Reception ==
The film received positive reviews following its premiere. Cody Hamman of JoBlo.com gave the film a positive review and wrote, “Director Rob Alicea’s thriller Serena is the latest Screenlife movie I’ve given a chance to… and it was the latest one to win me over.”

== Awards ==
Year	Award	Category	Result
2026	Raindance Film Festival	Roger Corman Award for Best Horror Feature	Won
