= Never Grow Old (film) =

2019 film by Ivan Kavanagh

- Theatrical release poster
- Directed by: Ivan Kavanagh
- Written by: Ivan Kavanagh
- Produced by: Jacqueline Kerrin; Dominic Wright; Nicolas Steil
- Starring: Emile Hirsch; Déborah François; John Cusack; Danny Webb; Tim Ahern; Sam Louwyck; Manon Capelle
- Cinematography: Piers McGrail
- Edited by: Dermot Diskin
- Music by: Aza Hand; Will Slattery; Gast Waltzing
- Production company: Ripple World Pictures
- Distributed by: Wildcard Distribution (Ireland)
- Release dates: March 15, 2019 (United States); August 23, 2019 (Ireland)
- Running time: 100 minutes
- Countries: Ireland; Luxembourg
- Language: English
- Box office: $106,796

Never Grow Old is a 2019 revisionist Western film written and directed by Ivan Kavanagh. It stars Emile Hirsch, Déborah François, John Cusack, Danny Webb, Tim Ahern and Sam Louwyck. Saban Films released the film on March 15.

== Plot ==
A man carrying a gun enters a frontier church in Garlow, a town on the California Trail, and a shot rings out.

In the past, the man, Patrick Tate, attends a service at the church during which the preacher claims that some in the congregation regret banning alcohol, gambling, and prostitution, but that this has made theirs a "Christian" town. After church Pat talks with his friend Ed, who offers to babysit his two kids. Pat and his family enter a store where his son asks if he wants a gun, to which Pat replies that he has a rifle. Meanwhile, a strange man enters, grunts aggressively at the storekeeper, and stares at Pat's wife Audrey. Back at home, Pat and Audrey discuss how they never made it to their goal in California. Pat wishes to move on now that the "Christian" town has quietened down, but Audrey doesn't want to leave.

In the middle of the night, three men approach Pat's home and ask for a man named Bill Crabtree. Though he gives the men directions, their leader demands that he go with them. He takes the men to Bill's wife's house, but she tells them that Bill left town a year earlier. The leader reveals that he is a bounty hunter looking for Bill, who is wanted for murder. Afterward, he asks to be taken to the saloon, where the innkeeper tells him that the preacher threatened to burn his establishment down if he didn't stop supplying alcohol and prostitutes. Over drinks, the leader introduces himself as Dutch Albert and his companions as Dumb Dumb (whose tongue is cut out) and Sicily, an Italian who does not speak English. Pat introduces himself as a carpenter and undertaker. Dutch claims that he understands how it feels to be an outsider like Pat, an Irish Catholic. Since the innkeeper has no food, the men return to Patrick's house where he wakes Audrey so she can make a meal for them. Dumb Dumb leers at her.

Dutch returns to the innkeeper and buys his hotel to turn it back into a saloon. One month later, it is in full swing with gambling and prostitution. The innkeeper, Jim Emmett, fetches Patrick because a man "accidentally" dies in the saloon. The sheriff is suspicious, but everyone is silent when asked what happened. At the funeral, the preacher accuses the sheriff of dereliction and demands justice. That night, Dutch wakes Patrick and orders two coffins. He takes Pat to a dugout where he kills Bill Crabtree and Crabtree's partner, whom Dutch claims robbed him. He pays Pat to bury the men.

In a card game at the saloon, Dutch cleans out a young man who cannot pay his debt. When Dutch refuses to let him leave, the boy pulls a gun, so Dutch shoots him. He claims to have killed the boy in self-defense, and no one says otherwise. Everyone hears the gunshots across the street in the church and goes to see the body; the sheriff is angry with Dutch but can do nothing. Later, back at the store, Dumb Dumb follows Audrey inside and tries to touch her face, to which she reacts sharply. He seems to grunt "I love you" before leaving in shame. When Audrey tells Pat about the incident, he claims no harm will come to her.

Mrs. Crabtree goes to see Dutch at the saloon and offers to work as a whore because she is starving. Dutch says he will take her and her daughter Emily, but not her alone. At Pat's house, a couple pass by in a wagon, saying they are headed to California and asking where the saloon is. Shortly thereafter, Pat hears gunshots and finds the man dead in the street, presumably killed by Dutch's gang. After preparing the body, he gives his children candy and Audrey a new dress, but she refuses because it is fancy and she will look out of place. Offended, he goes into town and has a drink in the saloon. He has a tense encounter with Dutch, but it is interrupted by a gunshot. Upstairs, Emily has killed the man who paid for her.

After Pat is commissioned to build a gallows to hang Emily, his wife tells him he will be implicated in her death, but he says he must. The next day, Emily is hanged. Dumb Dumb follows Audrey home and stalks her with a knife, but before he can get to her Pat comes up behind him and strangles him, hiding the body in Emily's coffin. Now realizing the depths of his depravity, Pat agrees to leave with Audrey the next day.

That night, the preacher sets the saloon ablaze. Dutch kills him and the sheriff who comes to his defense. Pat takes up the sheriff's gun but walks away from the encounter. The next day, while he buries the two, Sicily tries to kill Audrey. She hides her children and uses Pat's rifle to shoot Sicily in his arm. They fight and she stabs him in the stomach. She takes one of his guns and they shoot each other, killing Sicily. Pat's children run to the graveyard to tell him and he races home to find Audrey gravely injured. He asks Ed to take care of his family if he does not come back.

Pat retrieves his money from its hiding place and buys a blunderbuss and a pistol. He loads the blunderbuss with nails and two silver coins, which are traditionally placed on a corpse's eyes. He enters the church, as seen in the first scene, where he finds Dutch and Jim Emmett. Dutch draws on him, but Patrick fires the blunderbuss into Dutch, who shoots him in the gut. Pat then turns his pistol on Jim, killing him. He walks home and collapses on his porch, bleeding badly. His son asks if he is dying and Pat says that he is. His son says that Ed thinks his mother will survive. Pat tells his son that he loves him, his sister, and his mother more than life itself, and instructs him to go get Ed. Pat remains on the porch, dying.

== Cast ==
- Emile Hirsch as Patrick Tate
- Déborah François as Audrey Tate
- John Cusack as Dutch Albert
- Danny Webb as Preacher Pike
- Tim Ahern as Sheriff Parker
- Sam Louwyck as Dumb-Dumb
- Camille Pistone as Sicily
- Antonia Campbell-Hughes as Maria Pike
- Paul Reid as Ed
- Blake Berris as Fred
- Anne Coesens as Mrs. Crabtree
- Paul Ronan as Bill Crabtree
- Manon Capelle as Emily Crabtree

== Production ==
In December 2017, it was announced Emile Hirsch, John Cusack, Deborah Francois, Antonia Campbell-Hughes, Paul Ronan, Danny Webb had joined the cast of the film, with Ivan Kavanagh directing from a screenplay he wrote. In an interview published on Cineuropa prior to its US release, Ivan Kavanagh told Davide Abbatescianni that his main inspiration when writing were ”the frontier photographs from the 1850s onwards. The hardship on the people’s faces was startlingly apparent, and when you listen to the hymns they sang at the time, they are about hardship, the misery of life, and how life will be better on the other side, in Heaven. It is a very sobering and moving view of the founding of America, and of the immigrant experience. I tried to get some of that into the film, as well as paying homage to the westerns I loved as a child.”

== Release ==
In February 2018, Saban Films acquired distribution rights to the film. It was released in North America on March 15, 2019. It then released in Ireland on August 23.

== Reception ==
Rotten Tomatoes, a review aggregator, reports that 86% of 22 surveyed critics gave the film a positive review; the average rating is 6.7/10. Based on eight reviews, Metacritic rated it 65/100, which it labels "generally favorable reviews".
