= It Is in Us All =

2022 thriller film

- Film poster
- Directed by: Antonia Campbell-Hughes
- Written by: Antonia Campbell-Hughes
- Produced by: Conor Barry; Emma Foley; Tamryn Reinecke
- Starring: Cosmo Jarvis; Rhys Mannion; Claes Bang; Antonia Campbell-Hughes; Keith McErlean; Mark O'Halloran
- Cinematography: Piers McGrail
- Edited by: John Walters
- Production companies: Savage Productions; Pale Rebel Productions
- Release date: 14 March 2022 (SXSW)
- Countries: United Kingdom; Ireland
- Language: English
- Budget: £400,000

It Is in Us All is a 2022 Irish thriller film written and directed by Antonia Campbell-Hughes. The film stars Cosmo Jarvis, Antonia Campbell-Hughes, Rhys Mannion, Keith McErlean, Claes Bang and Mark O'Halloran. The film premiered at the 2022 South by Southwest Film Festival on 14 March.

== Premise ==
A Londoner returns to his ancestral homeland of County Donegal, Ireland and is drawn in by a teenager who almost kills him in a car crash.

== Cast ==
- Cosmo Jarvis as Hamish Considine
- Rhys Mannion as Evan
- Antonia Campbell-Hughes as Cara Daly
- Keith McErlean as Gabriel
- Mark O'Halloran as Father Mark
- Lalor Roddy as Grandfather
- Pauline Hutton as Avis Receptionist
- Shashi Rami as Bradley
- Isaac Heslip as Riley
- Claes Bang as Jack Considine
- Peter Trant as Officer Kiely

== Production ==
Principal photography began on 14 October 2020, and concluded on 14 November 2020 in County Donegal.

== Reception ==
On the review aggregator website Rotten Tomatoes, 79% of 42 critics' reviews are positive. The website's consensus reads: "Relying more on atmosphere than straightforward storytelling, It Is in Us All burnishes its slow-building story with outstanding cinematography." Metacritic, which uses a weighted average, assigned the film a score of 70 out of 100, based on 7 critics, indicating "generally favorable" reviews.
