= Ivan Kavanagh =

Irish filmmaker, writer and director

Ivan Kavanagh is an Irish filmmaker, writer and director, best known for Son (2021), The Canal (2014) and Never Grow Old (2019). He was born in Dublin, Ireland.

His second feature film The Solution won Best Drama at the Portobello Film Festival 2007 in London. His third feature Tin Can Man won Boundary Breaking Best Feature at the Sydney Underground Film Festival 2007 and Best Actor for Patrick O'Donnell. It also won Best Foreign Film, Best Foreign Actor for Michael Parle and Best Foreign Director at the Melbourne Underground Film Festival 2008 and Best Cinematography at the Strasbourg International Film Festival 2008.

He self-financed his early micro-budget feature films by working several jobs and buying his own camera, editing and sound equipment, serving not only as director/writer, but also editor, sound designer and occasional composer on all of his films until The Canal in 2014.

His 2009 feature film The Fading Light won Best Irish Film and Best Male Actor for Patrick O'Donnell at the Dublin Film Critics Circle Awards during the Jameson Dublin International Film Festival 2010. Amongst many other festivals, it also played in the World Cinema section of the prestigious Pusan International Film Festival 2010, South Korea and at the Titanic Film Festival 2011, Hungary.

Ivan's critically acclaimed psychological horror, The Canal (2014) produced by Park Films and financed by the Irish Film Board and Film Agency Wales, had its world premiere at the Tribeca International Film Festival 2014 in New York, and was subsequently released in cinemas worldwide to critical acclaim.

In 2019, Ivan's western Never Grow Old produced by Ripple World Pictures, starring John Cusack and Emile Hirsch, was released in cinemas worldwide, also to critical acclaim.

2021 saw the release of Ivan's latest critically acclaimed film Son (Park Films), which he wrote and directed, a psychological horror film, starring Andi Matichak and Emile Hirsch, which won the Silver Raven Award at the 39th Brussels International Festival of Fantasy. The production was beset by a number of disasters during the shoot in Mississippi including two tornadoes, one of which lifted a huge tree onto one of the houses where they were due to shoot the next day, forcing Kavanagh to rewrite the scene, incorporating this into the story. Kavanagh was also approached by a self-proclaimed Satanist on set who said they were messing with dark forces and should stop, which gave way to rumors that the film was cursed.

At the 2021 Virgin Media Dublin International Film Festival, Ivan was presented with the George Byrne Maverick Award by the Dublin Film Critics Circle.

== Filmography ==
Year	Title
2021	Son
2019	Never Grow Old
2014	The Canal
2009	The Fading Light
2008	Our Wonderful Home
2007	Tin Can Man
2007	The Solution
2002	Bandage Man
