= Maisie (2021 film) =

2021 British documentary

- Directed by: Lee Cooper
- Written by: Lee Cooper
- Produced by: Lee Cooper, Deborah Aston
- Starring: David Raven, Darcelle XV, Paul O’Grady
- Cinematography: Sam Parsons
- Edited by: Gareth Lang
- Music by: Various
- Production company: Proper Charlie Productions
- Distributed by: Bohemia Media (UK)
- Release date: 2021
- Running time: 76 minutes
- Country: United Kingdom
- Language: English

Maisie (stylized in uppercase MAISIE) is a 2021 British documentary film directed by Lee Cooper. The film offers an intimate portrait of David Raven, better known as Maisie Trollette, Britain’s oldest performing drag artist, as he prepares to celebrate his 85th birthday. The documentary explores themes of ageing, identity, and resilience within the LGBTQ+ community, and includes appearances by American drag performer Darcelle XV and British entertainer Paul O’Grady. It premiered at Sheffield DocFest and was later distributed in the UK by Bohemia Media.

== Synopsis ==
After more than fifty years on stage, David Raven—known by his drag persona Maisie Trollette—is preparing for his 85th birthday. A surprise celebration is planned in Brighton featuring a special guest: Darcelle XV (Walter Cole), the Guinness World Record holder as the world’s oldest drag performer. As tensions rise between Britain’s pantomime dame and America’s pageant queen, David also faces the emotional and physical challenges of performing in his eighth decade.

The film blends humour and poignancy, showcasing both the glamour and the reality of queer elderhood. It features performances of Broadway classics including Lady Is a Tramp, One, and If I Never Sing Another Song.

== Cast ==
- David Raven / Maisie Trollette
- Darcelle XV / Walter Cole
- Paul O’Grady

== Production ==
MAISIE was written, directed and co-produced by Lee Cooper. The film was developed over three years and marks Cooper’s directorial debut following a career in fashion art direction. It was produced by Proper Charlie Productions and supported by the BFI Doc Society.

Co-producer Deborah Aston's credits include Small Axe and the BAFTA-nominated Boiling Point. Executive Producer Lisa Marie Russo’s previous work includes The Spirit of ’45 and Of Time and the City.

== Release ==
The film premiered at Sheffield DocFest in 2021 and has screened at multiple international film festivals. It was released in the UK by Bohemia Media and received a 15 rating from the British Board of Film Classification.

== Reception ==
MAISIE received positive critical acclaim for its portrayal of ageing and queer identity. It won the Best Documentary award from the Dublin Film Critics Circle and the Audience Award at the Brighton CINECITY Film Festival.

The Guardian praised the film as an "affectionate portrait of Britain’s oldest drag act." Sight and Sound described it as "a portrait of both an artiste and an old man." The Independent noted the film "triumphs in showing how even the most sequined of masks can be used to deflect life’s deepest fears." Film Review Daily wrote that it "leaves a vivid impression and deserves attention for giving voice to a too-often unseen LGBTQ+ demographic."

The film also appears on Rotten Tomatoes, with additional positive reviews from critics.

== Awards and nominations ==
- Best Documentary – Dublin Film Critics Circle
- Audience Award – Brighton CINECITY Film Festival
- Official Selection – Sheffield DocFest
