= Andi Matichak =

American actress

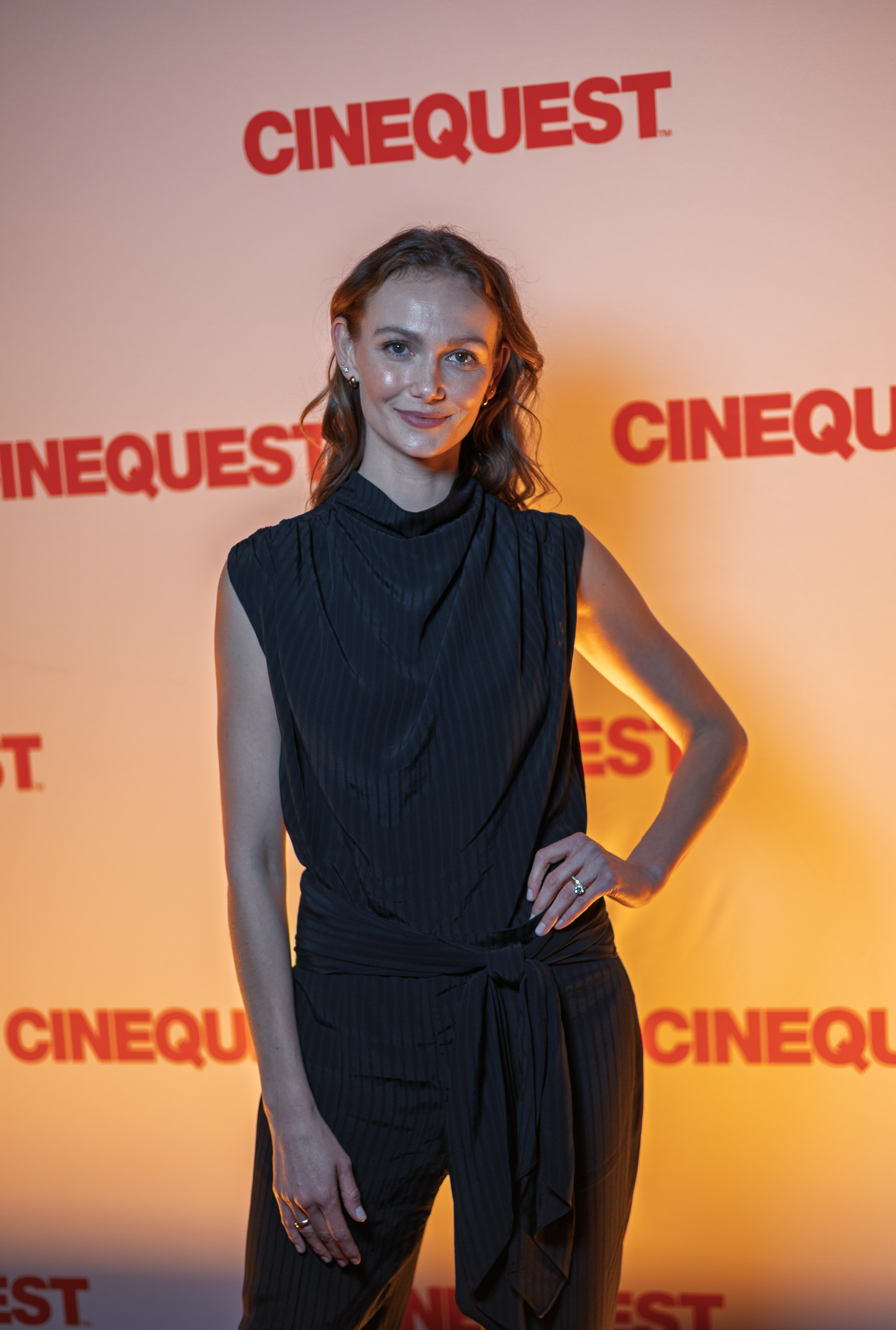
- Matichak at the Cinequest Film Festival in 2026
- Born: Framingham, Massachusetts, U.S.
- Occupation: Actress
- Years active: 2013–present

Andi Matichak (/məˈtiːtʃɛk/) is an American actress. She first appeared in television series such as 666 Park Avenue, Orange Is the New Black and Blue Bloods, before making her film debut as Allyson Nelson in the horror film series Halloween, Halloween Kills, and Halloween Ends.

== Early life ==
Matichak was born in Framingham, Massachusetts, but raised in the suburbs of Chicago, Illinois. She attended St. Francis High School in Wheaton, Illinois. During a summer while still in high school, Matichak worked as a model in Greece, where she met a talent agent who encouraged her to act. After returning to Chicago, she began taking acting classes. Matichak graduated from St. Francis High School one year early and forwent a full-ride soccer scholarship to attend the University of South Florida, instead moving to New York City to pursue modeling and acting.

== Career ==
Matichak has made guest appearances in numerous television series, such as 666 Park Avenue, Orange Is the New Black, Underground, and Blue Bloods. In 2015, she made her feature film debut in an uncredited role in the Victoria Justice-starring film Naomi and Ely's No Kiss List.

Matichak starred in the horror sequel film Halloween (2018). She plays the role of Allyson Nelson, the daughter of Judy Greer's character Karen Nelson, and the granddaughter of Jamie Lee Curtis' Laurie Strode, whose character also starred in the 1978 original film. She also appears in its two sequels.

== Filmography ==
=== Film ===
Year	Title	Role	Note
2015	Naomi and Ely's No Kiss List	Montana	Uncredited
2016	Miles	Wendy Brazda	
2016	Evol	Samantha	
2018	Bathroom Talk	Lex	Short film; also writer and producer
2018	Halloween	Allyson Nelson	
2019	Assimilate	Kayla Shepard	
2021	Son	Laura	
2021	Halloween Kills	Allyson Nelson	
2021	Foxhole	Gale	
2022	Halloween Ends	Allyson Nelson	
2026	Serena	Serena	

=== Television ===
Year	Title	Role	Notes
2013	666 Park Avenue	Shannon	Episodes: "Sins of the Fathers", "The Elysian Fields"
2014	Making It: The Series	Maggie	4 episodes; also producer
2015	Orange Is the New Black	Meadow	Episode: "Finger in the Dyke"
2016	Underground	Miss Jubilee	Episode: "Troubled Water"
2017	Blue Bloods	Caroline	Episode: "The One That Got Away"
2017	The Boonies	Holly	Unknown episodes
