= The Canal (2014 film) =

Irish horror film, directed by Ivan Kavanagh

- Official film poster
- Directed by: Ivan Kavanagh
- Written by: Ivan Kavanagh
- Produced by: AnneMarie Naughton
- Starring: Antonia Campbell-Hughes; Rupert Evans; Steve Oram
- Cinematography: Piers McGrail
- Edited by: Robin Hill
- Music by: Ceiri Torjussen
- Production companies: Park Films; Treasure Entertainment; Western Edge Pictures
- Release date: 18 April 2014 (Tribeca Film Festival)
- Running time: 92 minutes
- Country: Ireland
- Language: English

The Canal is a 2014 Irish horror film that was directed and written by Ivan Kavanagh. The film had its world premiere on 18 April 2014, at the Tribeca Film Festival, and stars Rupert Evans as a father investigating a horrific murder that took place in his home in the early 1900s.

== Synopsis ==
Film archivist David has been having a rough time lately, as he suspects that his wife Alice has been cheating on him with Alex, one of her work clients. This stress is compounded when David's work partner Claire gives him a reel of footage to be archived that shows that his house was the setting for a brutal murder in 1902. David's fears are confirmed when he follows Alice after work and sees her have sex with Alex. Devastated, David grabs a hammer but, coming to his senses, throws it into a nearby canal. Feeling sick, he rushes to a nearby public toilet that his son Billy believes to be haunted, where he vomits. A creepy voice whispers unintelligibly to him and, before passing out, David sees what he believes to be a ghostly figure murder his wife.

When Alice does not return home he contacts the police. When Detective McNamara questions him, David denies knowledge of the affair and does not mention the events at the canal. The police eventually find her body at the bottom of the canal, though they rule her death accidental. As David grieves, he becomes obsessed with a series of unsolved, 100-year-old murders that took place around the canal and his home, worrying Claire and putting an increasing strain on his relationship with Billy's nanny, Sophie. David's behaviour grows erratic, and he borrows early 20th-century cameras to shoot footage around his home and the canal, where he hopes to capture evidence of supernatural activity. After becoming convinced he has seen ghosts, he moves Sophie and Billy out of his house and into a hotel room.

During a video chat with Billy, David sees a ghost in the background, and he breaks into the hotel room, frightening Sophie. David moves them back into the house, but when David is unwilling to explain his behaviour, Sophie tells him that she plans to quit in the morning. That night, Sophie is assaulted. David grabs her and locks her in a closet with Billy as he searches the house. Now on his own, David turns to Claire for help in developing footage; she reluctantly agrees. When the police find the hammer in the canal, they become suspicious that David murdered his wife. David's lawyer is able to broker a deal in which Billy will not be taken from him until the results of a psychiatric examination, though David refuses to follow through with it.

Claire drops by David's house to deliver the developed film stock, and he convinces her to watch it with him. Though she at first says she sees nothing, she is frightened by a ghostly figure that approaches closer and closer, until it emerges from a hole in the wall. The ghost strangles Claire, and David flees, only to run into McNamara, who was watching the house. The policemen chase David as he flees with Billy into a hidden tunnel that leads to the canal. David, who believes the tunnel was used by devil worshippers to sacrifice local children, is flooded with memories as he sees a ghostly version of his wife: the voice in the toilet ordered him to kill his wife and, in a rage, he drowned her in the canal. When Claire saw nothing on the footage, he strangled her himself.

When David reaches the canal, a ghostly figure pulls him under. He does not fight it, though he helps McNamara rescue Billy. Following David's death, Billy's grandmother sells the house and takes custody of Billy. As Billy runs into the house to fetch a toy, David's ghost appears from crack in the wall and tells Billy that they can be together (including Alice) forever in the house; Billy jumps out of his grandmother's car as they drive down the road. Back in the house, the real estate salesperson smiles as she sees Billy in his upstairs room closing a door.

== Cast ==
- Rupert Evans as David – Husband
- Antonia Campbell-Hughes as Claire – Co-worker
- Hannah Hoekstra as Alice – Wife
- Kelly Byrne as Sophie – Nanny
- Steve Oram as Detective McNamara
- Calum Heath as Billy Williams – Son
- Anthony Murphy as Policeman 1
- Serena Brabazon as Estate Agent
- Maura Foley as Woman in Garden
- Sinead Watters as Anna
- Carl Shaaban as Alex
- Alicja Ayres as Margaret Jackson
- Paddy Curran as William Jackson
- Myles Horgan as Lawyer

== Production ==
Filming for The Canal took place in Dublin, Ireland, in the middle of 2013. Funding came from the Irish Film Board and Section 481, Ireland's tax incentive for films and television. While creating the script, Kavanagh drew upon his own fears and wrote the script in a "start-to-finish" manner, beginning with the first page of the script. He also heavily focused on the film's sound, as he wanted it to be "as important as the picture" and did not use any pre-recorded archived sounds. Kavanagh experienced difficulty with filming the footage for the 1902 reel, as he wanted it to look identical to Louis Lumière's Feeding the Baby. He tested out different camera formats before finally filming the finished product with a 1915 Universal movie camera and using the "lowest speed B&W 35mm stock we could get our hands on".

== Reception ==
Critical reception for The Canal has been generally positive and the film holds a rating of 75% on Rotten Tomatoes, based on 20 reviews, and the average rating is 6 out of 10. Twitch Film praised the acting of Steve Oram and child actor Calum Heath as among the film's highlights. HorrorNews.net and Fangoria both gave the film glowing reviews, and Fangoria commented that it was "an unnerving, dread-fueled piece of work". Bloody Disgusting stated that although the film will "test the patients [sic] of some viewers, and could really use a more impactful finale", it was overall "an old-school genre haunter". In contrast, Slant Magazine's reviewer criticised The Canal for not delving deeply enough into the imagery and themes, leaving an impression of superficiality.
