= King Keraun =

American actor, comedian and internet personality

- Born: Keraun Harris; January 17, 1988 (age 38); Houston, Texas, U.S.
- Occupations: Comedian, actor, internet personality
- Years active: 2013–present

Keraun Harris (born January 17, 1988), better known by his online alias and persona King Keraun, is an actor, comedian, and Internet personality who has appeared on HBO's Insecure, ABC's Black-ish, and Halloween Ends.

== Early life ==
Harris was born in Houston as the eldest of five children of Derrick Harris, a former National Football League player. In 2009, Harris served a 2 1/2-year term for robbery and credit card abuse convictions in federal prison. After his release from prison, he worked with chemicals on oil fields, which he soon quit because of medical problems caused by the work.

== Career ==
After quitting his job in the oil fields, Harris started posting funny videos online to pass the time while looking for a new job. His short videos on Instagram (which only allowed videos to be 15 seconds in length) about relationships, family and football brought him to the attention of Russell Simmons who became his mentor. Harris massed more than 1.4 million Instagram followers, 1.8 million Facebook likes, and more than 100 million Vine loops, and used his newfound celebrity status to advertise for multiple companies seeking to use new media to promote their products.

In 2015, Harris was offered a guest role in ABC's Black-ish episode "Chop Shop".

== Filmography ==
=== Films ===
Year	Title	Role	Notes
2016	Major Deal	Mike	
2022	Halloween Ends	Willy the Kid	

=== Television ===
Year	Title	Role	Notes
2015	Black-ish	Smoke	Episode: "Chop Shop"
2015–2016	30 Days 2 Life	Mike	6 episodes
2017	Insecure	Daniel King	Episode: "Hella Great"
2019–2021	That White People Shit	King Keraun Harris	18 episodes
2021–present	Millennials	Jaheem Cartwrite	12 episodes
