= James Jude Courtney =

American actor and stunt performer

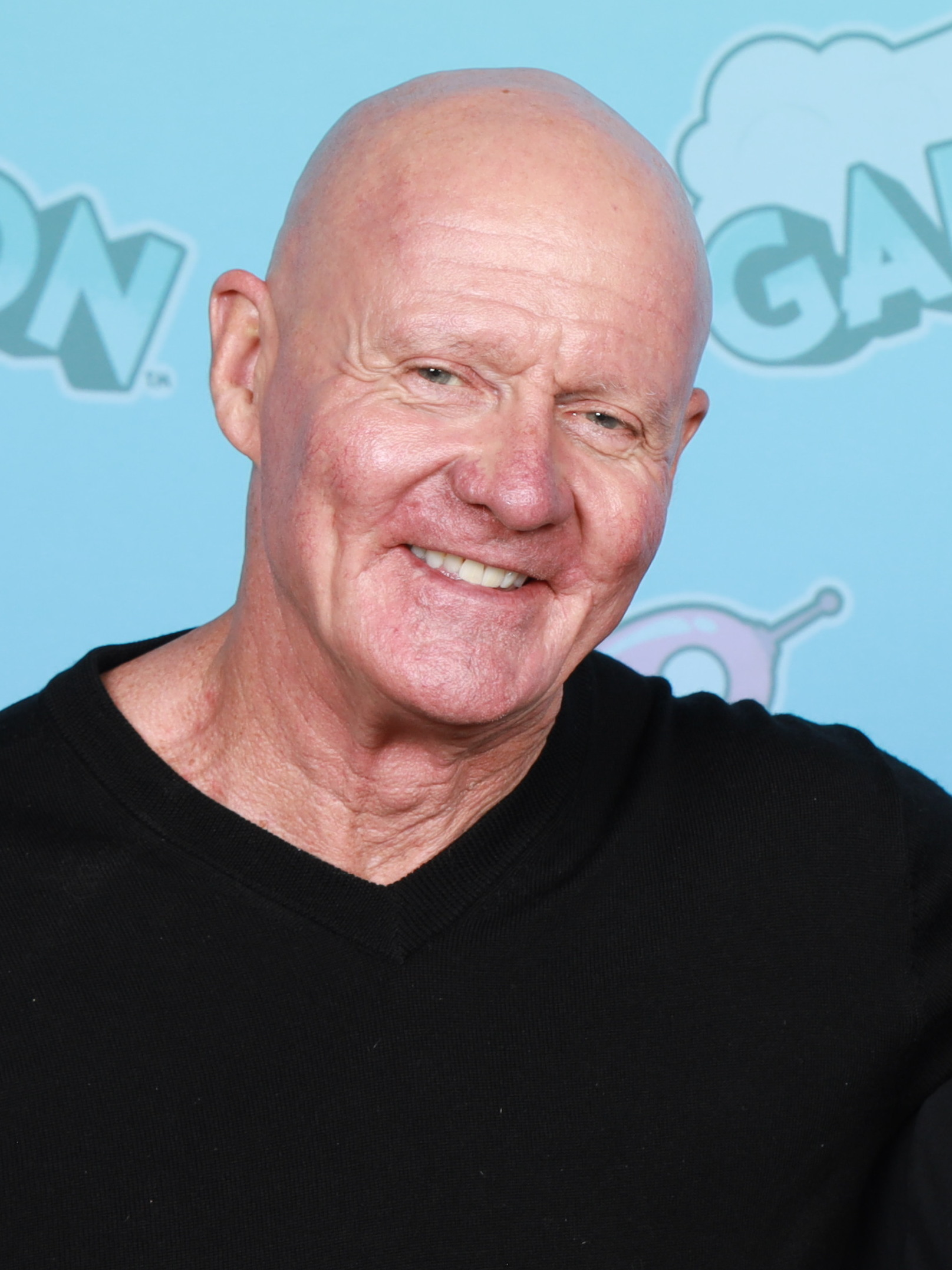
- Courtney in 2025
- Born: January 31, 1957 (age 69); Garfield Heights, Ohio, U.S.
- Education: University of South Carolina
- Occupations: Actor; Stunt double; Stunt performer
- Years active: 1987–present

James Jude Courtney (born January 31, 1957) is an American actor, stunt double, and stunt performer. He is best known for playing fictional mass murderer Michael Myers in the 2018 film Halloween and its two sequels, Halloween Kills and Halloween Ends. He also played Der Kindestod in the Buffy the Vampire Slayer episode "Killed by Death".

== Life and career ==
Courtney was born on January 31, 1957, in Garfield Heights, Ohio, and raised in Columbia, South Carolina, as the eldest of seven brothers. From an early age, Courtney was determined to become an actor and made short films from fifth grade through college. He majored in journalism at the University of South Carolina in 1981 and subsequently moved to California to pursue acting.

He started working at Universal Studios Hollywood as a tour guide before he was cast as Conan in the park's Conan the Barbarian live show. Courtney applied his martial arts skills to the role, which demanded high falls and sword fights; he sustained multiple injuries during performances. At Universal Studios, Courtney met actor Brian Thompson and stunt coordinator Alex Daniels, who helped him to branch out as a stunt performer. He also pursued acting studies at the Royal Academy of Dramatic Art and was coached by Stella Adler.

Courtney made his film acting debut in 1989 in The Freeway Maniac and continued acting through 2002. In 1998, he gained wider recognition playing the role of Der Kindestod in the Buffy the Vampire Slayer episode "Killed by Death".

=== Halloween films ===
Courtney played Michael Myers in David Gordon Green's horror film Halloween, the 2018 sequel to John Carpenter's 1978 film of the same name. Green asked the film's stunt coordinator Ron Hutchinson whether he knew an experienced stunt actor that was "6-feet-3, 200 pounds, and in his 60s," upon which Hutchinson recommended Courtney. Green explained to Courtney his vision for Myers's mannerisms, an amalgamation of the performance of Nick Castle, who originally played the character in 1978, and the addition of a feline style of movement, which Courtney tailored his portrayal to by observing the movement of his pet cat. He used Carpenter and Castle's work on the original film to inform how the forty years that transpired between the events of the films would affect the character.

The December 2017 announcement of Castle's participation in the film was widely reported as his retaking the role of Myers, with Courtney only doing additional work as the character. However, in a 2018 interview, Courtney stated that Castle's screentime only amounted to a single cameo and that every scene under the mask was done by himself, including the scene which he shares with Castle, leading to the question of why Castle's return had been misrepresented by the production.

Courtney returned to the role for the film's 2021 sequel, Halloween Kills, with Nick Castle once again sharing the acting credit, although Castle's only scene in the film was excluded from the final cut. Courtney stated that his stunt work for the film, especially for scenes including fire, was among the most challenging of his career. He portrayed the character for a third and last time in 2022's Halloween Ends, thus earning him the accolade of being the actor to portray Myers the most times. For Halloween Ends, director David Gordon Green made the decision to have Courtney physically portray the character for the entirety of the film for the first time, citing his "extraordinary work" in the previous films.

Honoring his portrayal of Michael Myers in 2018's Halloween, October 19, the film's United States opening day, was officially proclaimed James Jude Courtney Day in Warren County, Kentucky. Courtney was nominated for Best Actor at the 2019 Fangoria Chainsaw Awards alongside Castle for his work in Halloween. For his performance in Halloween Kills, Courtney was nominated for Best Villain at the 2022 MTV Movie & TV Awards.

== Selected filmography ==
Title	Year	TV or Film	Role	Notes
Tour of Duty	1987–1990	TV		Stunts
Knots Landing	1989	TV	Peter Christopher / R. Peter Christopher	3 episodes
We're Talking Serious Money	1991	Film	Biker #2	
Unsolved Mysteries	1992	TV	Peter Byrne	
Far and Away	1992	Film	Boxer	
Danger Theatre	1993	TV	Man in Bar	1 episode
Philadelphia Experiment II	1993	Film	Vortex Technician	
When a Man Loves a Woman	1994	Film	Earl	
Girl in the Cadillac	1995	Film		Stunts
Babylon 5	1994–1996	TV	Narn #1 / Gyor	2 episodes; stunts
Devil in the Flesh	1997	TV	Mr. Roberts	
Buffy the Vampire Slayer	1998	TV	Der Kindestod	1 episode; stunts
Level 9	2000–2001	TV		Stunts; stunt driver
Halloween	2018	Film	Michael Myers / The Shape	credit shared with Nick Castle
Halloween Kills	2021	Film	Michael Myers / The Shape	credit shared with Nick Castle
Halloween Ends	2022	Film	Michael Myers / The Shape	
