= Michael Myers (Halloween) =

Fictional character in the Halloween franchise

- Halloween character
- Michael Myers in Halloween (2018), portrayed by James Jude Courtney
- First appearance: Halloween
- Last appearance: Halloween: The Game (video game; 2026)
- Created by: John Carpenter; Debra Hill
- Portrayed by: Nick Castle; Dick Warlock; Tony Moran; George P. Wilbur; Don Shanks; Chris Durand; Brad Loree; Tyler Mane; James Jude Courtney

In-universe information
- Classification: Mass murderer
- Signature weapon: Chef's knife
- Location: Haddonfield, Illinois

Michael Myers is a character from the slasher film series Halloween. He first appears in John Carpenter's 1978 feature film Halloween as a young boy who murders his elder sister, Judith Myers. Fifteen years later, he returns home to Haddonfield, Illinois, to murder more teenagers. In the original Halloween, the adult Michael Myers, referred to as The Shape in the closing credits, was portrayed by Nick Castle for most of the film and substituted by Tony Moran in the final scene where Michael's face is revealed. The character was co-created by John Carpenter and Debrah Hill, and has been featured in twelve films, as well as novels, video games, and comic books.

The character is the primary antagonist in all the franchise's films with the exception of Halloween III: Season of the Witch, which is a standalone film disconnected from the continuity of the other films. Since Castle and Moran put on the mask in the original film, six actors have stepped into the same role. Castle, George P. Wilbur, Tyler Mane, and James Jude Courtney are the only actors to have portrayed Michael Myers more than once, with Mane and Courtney being the only actors to do so in consecutive films. The filmmakers describe Michael Myers as pure. He typically kills using a chef's knife. In the films, Michael wears a white Halloween mask, as well as coveralls, which he usually steals from a victim. The mask used in the first film was a Captain Kirk mask that originated from a cast of William Shatner's face made for the 1975 horror film The Devil's Rain.

== Appearances ==
Michael Myers appears in all of the Halloween films excluding the standalone Halloween III: Season of the Witch, although he is briefly seen on a television advertisement for the original film. Myers has also appeared in expanded universe novels and comic books.

=== Films and canons ===
Michael Myers’ story has gone through different timelines and canons, with some retconning previously established plots.

==== The Original continuity ====
Myers made his first appearance in the 1978 film Halloween. At the beginning of Halloween, a six-year-old Michael murders his teenage sister Judith on Halloween night in 1963. Fifteen years later, he escapes Smith's Grove Sanitarium and returns to his hometown of Haddonfield, Illinois, where he stalks a teenage babysitter named Laurie Strode, while his psychiatrist, Dr. Sam Loomis, attempts to track him down. After murdering three of Laurie's friends, Michael attacks her as well. She fends him off long enough for Loomis to arrive and shoot Michael six times, knocking him off a balcony; when Loomis goes to check the body, he finds that Michael has disappeared. Halloween II (1981) picks up directly where the original ended. Michael follows Laurie to the local hospital and kills the staff one by one. Loomis discovers that Laurie is Michael's younger sister and rushes to the hospital to find them. Laurie shoots Michael in the eyes, and Loomis blows up the operating theater while Laurie escapes. Michael emerges from the explosion, engulfed in flames, before finally collapsing dead.

Michael does not appear again until Halloween 4: The Return of Michael Myers in 1988, which picks up ten years after the events of Halloween II. In this canon, known as the "Thorn Timeline", Michael survived the explosion, leaving him in a coma. He awakens when he learns Laurie has died in a car accident but has a nine-year-old daughter, Jamie Lloyd. Returning to Haddonfield, he causes a citywide blackout and massacres the town's police force and some civilians before being shot by the state police and falling down a mine shaft. Halloween 5: The Revenge of Michael Myers begins immediately after the fourth film ends, with Michael escaping the mine shaft and being nursed back to health by a local hermit. One year later, he kills the hermit and returns to Haddonfield to find Jamie again, chasing her through his childhood home in a trap set by Loomis. He is eventually subdued by Loomis and taken to the local police station, but a mysterious "Man in Black" kills the officers and frees him.

Halloween: The Curse of Michael Myers takes place six years after the events of the previous film. Jamie, now fifteen, has been kidnapped and impregnated by a druid cult led by the Man in Black, later revealed to be Dr. Terence Wynn, Loomis' friend and colleague from Smith's Grove. After giving birth, Jamie escapes with her baby, only to be killed by Michael. The baby is found by Tommy Doyle, whom Laurie babysat in the original film. Upon returning to Haddonfield once more, Michael kills relatives of Laurie's adoptive family, who are living in his childhood home. He is revealed to be inflicted with the Curse of Thorn, which drives him to kill his family. Wynn and his cult kidnap Jamie's baby, as well as Kara Strode and her son Danny. Loomis and Tommy follow them to Smith's Grove, where Michael ultimately turns against the cult and slaughters them all. Tommy injects Michael with chemicals and beats him unconscious. Loomis stays behind as the others escape. In the theatrical version, Michael's mask is shown on the ground as Loomis screams in the distance, leaving their fates unknown. In the longer "Producer’s Cut", however, Loomis unmasks whom he thinks is Michael, but instead is revealed to be the dying Dr. Wynn (the "Man in Black"), passing the Mark of Thorn on to Loomis as Michael, now donning the outfit of the "Man in Black", escapes.

==== The H20 continuity ====
Halloween H20: 20 Years Later establishes a new timeline following only the first two films and ignoring the events of the previous three "Thorn" films. In this particular film, Michael has been missing since the hospital explosion twenty years ago. Laurie Strode has faked her death and gone into hiding in California under an assumed name. She is the headmistress of a private boarding school and has a teenage son named John. Michael tracks them down and murders John's friends. After getting her son to safety, Laurie decides to face Michael and ultimately decapitates him. Halloween: Resurrection, which picks up three years after H20, retcons Michael's death, establishing that the man Laurie decapitated was a paramedic whom Michael had attacked and swapped clothes with before escaping. Michael tracks down an institutionalized Laurie and kills her. He returns to Haddonfield, where one year later, he kills a group of college students filming an internet reality show inside his childhood home. Contestant Sara Moyer and show producer Freddie Harris escape after electrocuting Michael. Michael's body and the bodies of his victims are then taken to the morgue. As the medical examiner begins to inspect Michael's body, he awakens.

==== The Remake continuity ====
The series was rebooted in 2007 with Rob Zombie's Halloween remake. The film establishes from the beginning that Michael and Laurie are siblings, and has an increased focus on Michael's childhood: a ten-year-old Michael is shown killing animals and suffering emotional abuse at home. After killing his sister Judith and three others, he is committed to Smith's Grove where he takes up the hobby of creating papier-mâché masks and receives unsuccessful therapy from Dr. Sam Loomis. His mother Deborah commits suicide after witnessing him killing a nurse. As an adult, Michael returns to Haddonfield to reunite with Laurie. However, Laurie has no memory of Michael and is terrified of him, ultimately shooting him in the head in self-defense after he kills her friends and adoptive parents. In an unused alternate ending, Michael is shown listening to reason as Loomis convinces him to release Laurie and drop his weapon. He then begins to approach them, intentions unclear, before being shot down by Sheriff Brackett's overzealous men.

Zombie's story is continued in the 2009 sequel, Halloween II. The subsequent events and Michael's fate differ between the theatrical cut and extended Director's Cut of the film; in the former, the events of the film take place one year later, whereas in the latter, it is two years later. In both versions, Michael is presumed dead but resurfaces after a vision of Deborah informs him that he must track Laurie down so that they can "come home". In the film, Michael and Laurie are implied to have a mental link, with the two sharing visions of their mother. During the climax of the theatrical cut, after Michael has murdered Loomis, Laurie kills Michael by stabbing him repeatedly in the chest and face with his knife, with the final scene suggesting that she has taken on her brother's psychosis as she dons his mask. In the Director's Cut ending, Michael speaks a single word, 'die', before killing Loomis. He is then gunned down by the Haddonfield police. Laurie approaches Loomis' body whilst holding Michael's knife, and appears to raise the knife before she too is shot dead by police.

==== The Blumhouse continuity ====
Michael's appearance in the 2018 film Halloween establishes the "Blumhouse continuity". This version is a direct sequel to the original film in which Michael and Laurie are not siblings. It is established that after being shot by Loomis, Michael fled to his childhood home and was arrested by the Haddonfield police. After forty years at Smith's Grove Sanitarium, he escapes again and returns to Haddonfield for another killing spree. He again encounters Laurie, who has been living in fear of his return. She shoots off two of his fingers and, with the help of her daughter Karen and granddaughter Allyson, traps him in the basement of her house, which they then set on fire. Michael is heard breathing at the end of the credits, indicating that he survived.

Halloween Kills is a direct sequel to the 2018 film in which Michael escapes the burning house when the fire department arrive to stop the blaze before it becomes too intense. As Michael resumes his killing spree, the enraged townspeople form a mob to hunt him down. While the mob proves to be unnecessarily destructive, they do eventually swarm him and seemingly kill him. As they attempt to confirm he's really dead, Michael rises again and massacres them all. He returns to his childhood home, where he kills Karen as well. Halloween Ends (2022) picks up four years after its predecessor, revealing that after Karen's death, the town was unable to locate Michael and demolished his childhood home. Now in a badly weakened condition, Michael inhabits a sewer cavern where a troubled young man named Corey Cunningham, who is dating Allyson, encounters him. Corey brings Michael a victim to kill and starts to manifest the same evil. Corey dons his own mask and kills a doctor who passed Allyson over for a promotion. When Corey is having difficulty murdering the doctor's girlfriend, Michael appears and finishes the job. Corey eventually steals Michael's mask and murders several people who wronged him. He also goes after Laurie but is shot down a stairwell in her home. Michael arrives to retrieve his mask and kills Corey. Laurie pins Michael to a table and slits his throat, but he chokes her with the last of his strength. Allyson intervenes and breaks Michael's arm, allowing Laurie to fatally slice his wrist. A town-wide procession takes place, where everyone watches Laurie dispose of Michael's corpse in an industrial shredder, ending his rampage once and for all.

=== Literature ===
Michael Myers made his literary debut in October 1979 when Curtis Richards released a novelization of the film. The book follows the events of the film but includes references to the festival of Samhain. A prologue provides a possible explanation for Michael's murderous impulses, telling the story of Enda, a disfigured Celtic teenager who butchers the Druid princess Deirdre and her lover as revenge for rejecting him; the king subsequently has his shaman curse Enda's soul for walking the earth reliving his crime for eternity. It is later revealed that Michael Myers suffers nightmares about Enda and Deirdre, as did Michael's great-grandfather before shooting two people to death at a Halloween harvest dance in the 1890s. The novel shows Michael's childhood in more detail; his mother voices concern over her son's anti-social behavior shortly before he murders Judith. Dr. Loomis notices the boy's effortless control and manipulation of the staff and patients at Smith's Grove during his incarceration. Later in the story, Michael's stalking of Laurie and her friends is depicted as more explicitly sexual than was apparent in the film, with several references to him having an erection. Michael returned to the world of literature with the 1981 adaptation of Halloween II written by Jack Martin; it was published alongside the first film sequel, with the novel following the film events, with an additional victim, a reporter, added to the novel. The final novelization to feature Michael was Halloween IV, released October 1988. The novel was written by Nicholas Grabowsky, and like the previous adaptations, follows the events of Halloween 4: The Return of Michael Myers.

Over a four-month period, Berkley Books published three young adult novels written by Kelly O'Rourke; the novels are original stories created by O'Rourke, with no direct continuity with the films. The first, released on October 1, 1997, titled The Scream Factory, follows a group of friends who set up a haunted house attraction in the basement of Haddonfield City Hall, only to be stalked and killed by Michael Myers while they are there. The Old Myers Place is the second novel, released December 1, 1997, and focuses on Mary White, who moves into the Myers house with her family and takes up residence in Judith Myers' former bedroom. Michael returns home and begins stalking and attacking Mary and her friends. O'Rourke's final novel, The Mad House, was released on February 1, 1998. The Mad House features a young girl, Christine Ray, who joins a documentary film crew that travels to haunted locations; they are currently headed to Smith Grove Mental Hospital. The crew is quickly confronted by Michael Myers.

The character's first break into comics came with a series of comics published by Brian Pulido's Chaos! Comics. The first, simply titled Halloween, was intended to be a one-issue special, but eventually two sequels spawned: Halloween II: The Blackest Eyes and Halloween III: The Devil's Eyes. All of the stories were written by Phil Nutman, with Daniel Farrands—writer for Halloween: The Curse of Michael Myers—assisting on the first issue; David Brewer and Justiniano worked on the illustrations. Tommy Doyle is the main protagonist in each of the issues, focusing on his attempts to kill Michael Myers. The first issue includes backstory on Michael's childhood, while the third picks up after the events of the film Halloween H20.

In 2003, Michael appeared in the self-published comic One Good Scare, written by Stefan Hutchinson and illustrated by Peter Fielding. The main character in the comic is Lindsey Wallace, the young girl who first saw Michael Myers alongside Tommy Doyle in the original 1978 film. Hutchinson wanted to bring the character back to his roots, and away from the "lumbering Jason-clone" the film sequels had made him. On 25 July 2006, as an insert inside the DVD release of Halloween: 25 Years of Terror, the comic book Halloween: Autopsis was released. Written by Stefan Hutchinson and artwork by Marcus Smith and Nick Dismas, the story is about a photographer assigned to take pictures of Michael Myers. As the photographer, Carter, follows Dr. Loomis; he begins to take on Loomis's obsession himself, until finally meeting Michael Myers in person, which results in his death.

In 2008, Devil's Due Publishing began releasing more Halloween comic books, starting with a four issue mini series, titled Halloween: Nightdance. Written by Stefan Hutchinson, Nightdance takes place in Russellville, and follows Michael's obsession with Lisa Thomas, a girl who reminds him of his sister Judith. Lisa is afraid of the dark after Michael trapped her in a basement for days, and years later, he starts sending her disturbing, childlike drawings and murdering those around her on Halloween. Meanwhile, Ryan Nichols is hunting Michael down after seeing him attack and kidnap his wife. In the end, Michael frames Ryan for the murders and buries Lisa alive. Hutchinson explains that Nightdance was an attempt to escape the dense continuity of the film series and recreate the tone of the 1978 film; Michael becomes inexplicably fixated on Lisa, just as he did with Laurie in the original Halloween, before the sequels established that a sibling bond was actually his motivation for stalking her. Included in the Nightdance trade paperback is the short prose story Charlie, which features Charlie Bowles, a Russellville serial killer who taps into the same evil force which motivates Michael Myers. To celebrate the anniversary of the Halloween series, Devil's Due released a one-shot comic entitled Halloween: 30 Years of Terror in August 2008, written by Hutchinson. An anthology collection inspired by John Carpenter's original film, Michael appears in various stories, tampering with Halloween candy, decapitating a beauty queen, tormenting Laurie Strode, and killing a school teacher.

== Concept and creation ==
The character derives his name from English film distributor Michael Myers, who successfully distributed Assault on Precinct 13 in the UK through his Miracle Films. According to John Carpenter, Myers helped "push Assault on Precinct 13 into the London Film Festival, that's where my reputation kind of began, so I felt I owed him. So that was my tribute to him, he was this dearest, dearest man". Carpenter wanted to "raise this Michael Myers character up to a mythic status; make him human, yes, but almost like a force. A force that will never stop, that can't be denied." He did not want to give Michael a backstory, but put him immediately into a "legendary kind of situation". To elaborate, Carpenter explained that he was influenced by Yul Brynner's "killer robot that couldn't be destroyed" in Michael Crichton's Westworld. Carpenter felt this kind of character, one that was "a force", would be more terrifying than personifying him. Michael's mask was meant to help illustrate this further, because it would "blank out his human features [...] Making him then just some sort of force of evil that is irrational, unstoppable."

When developing the 2007 Halloween remake, Rob Zombie commented on his intentions for the character, stating that he wanted Michael Myers to be the lead character in the film. Zombie felt the character could be made "more intense" if he was more than just a "faceless thing floating around in the background". Zombie believed it was important to be able to see the events that shape the character, making it "more disturbing" to the audience.

=== Developing "The Shape" ===
In the original film, three actors portrayed Michael Myers. Will Sandin played a six-year-old Michael, who murders his sister Judith on Halloween night. Later in the film, Tony Moran and Nick Castle would portray the adult Michael, with Moran credited as "Michael Myers (age 23)" and Castle credited as "The Shape". Nick Castle was a friend, and former University of Southern California schoolmate, of John Carpenter. Production on Halloween was taking place near Castle's house, so he asked Carpenter if he could hang around the set, because he was attempting to get his own movies "off the ground". Carpenter agreed on the condition that Castle play the role of the masked killer. For his part, Castle was paid $25 a day. Debra Hill remarks: "[Nick Castle's] father was a choreographer for Fred Astaire, and he just moved great. And I think John really wanted to play him as that, where he just looks, and his head turns, and he's enamored by this sister-like character that he sees in Laurie Strode. He makes the connection; he breaks out of the insane asylum and gets to his house, and sees this young girl, and makes this sort of subtle connection."

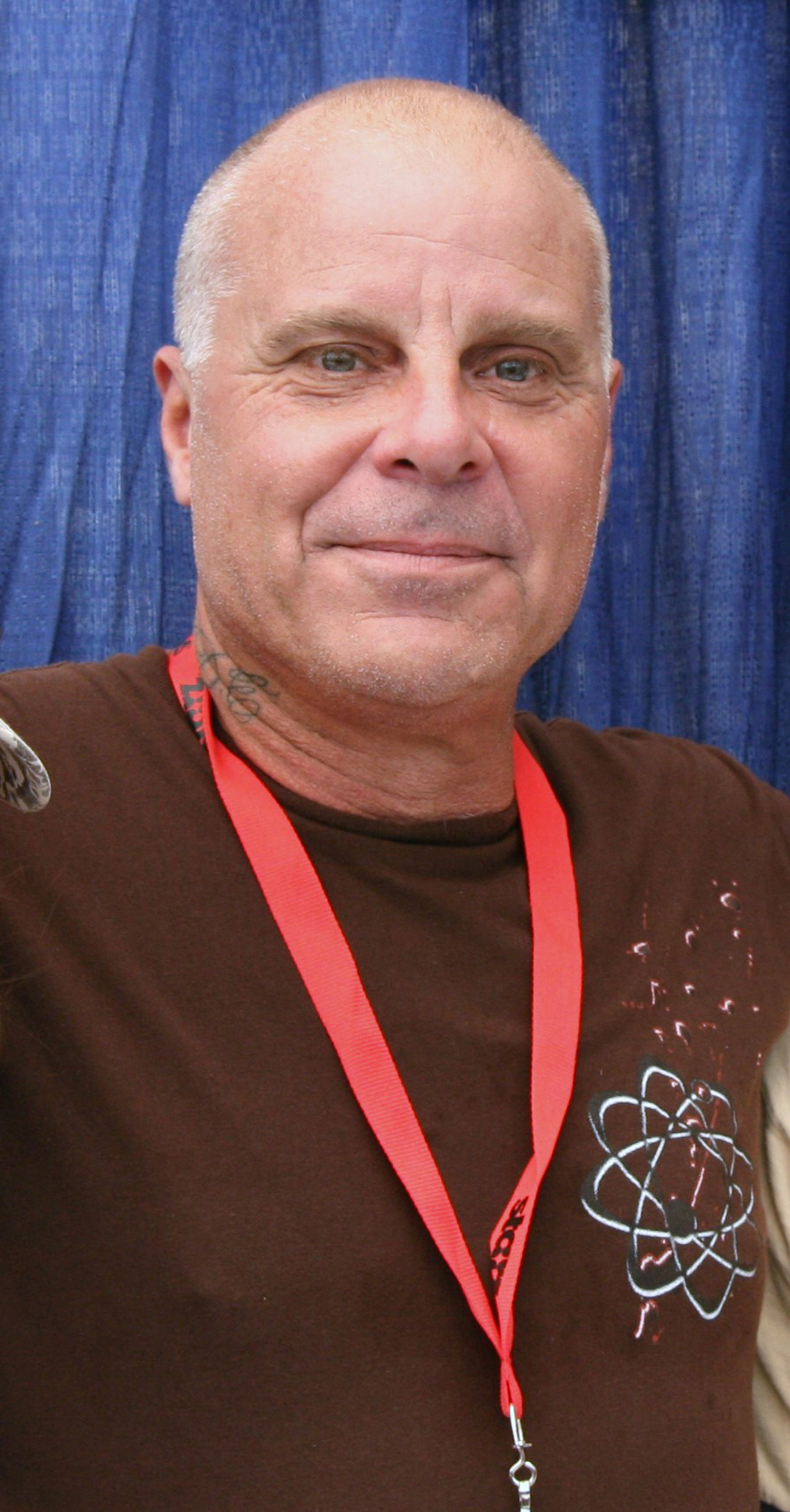
Moran at the 2009 San Diego Comic-Con

Castle's motivation while filming was simple, "walk from this point to the end point, and roll"; this was reflected in Carpenter's directing, or lack thereof, as Carpenter himself admits that the only bit of direction he gave Castle was, "Do nothing, just walk. Don't act, just walk." To elaborate, during filming Castle tried to find extra motivation for the character, attempting to get into the mind of someone who is mentally ill. Carpenter had to keep reminding him to keep it "simple"; he wanted Castle to make sure the character moved "gracefully" and was a "blank slate that we can project everything into, and make it much more horrifying". Jamie Lee Curtis believes Castle kept the character from being nothing more than just a "thug in a suit". Castle was replaced by Tony Moran for the scene where Michael is unmasked, because Carpenter and Hill wanted someone who had more of an "angelic" face.

Moran, who was looking for work, received a call from his agent about an audition for a "B flick", where he would be playing a "psycho". Moran prepared for his audition by neglecting to sleep, shave, shower or wash his hair for three days. He wore tattered clothes, with hiking boots to the audition. After being introduced to John Carpenter, Jamie Lee Curtis and Donald Pleasence, Moran proceeded to slam his feet up on the table and demand some coffee. He startled everyone at the table, and that afternoon received a phone call that he had gotten the job. Moran would take up the role from the point that Michael is strangling Laurie, as production designer Tommy Lee Wallace had performed the job during the scene where Michael breaks through the closet and Nick Castle in the part up to that scene. Moran would film the rest of the scenes—the removal of Michael's mask, being shot by Loomis and then falling over the balcony—except where Michael's body lies on the ground outside. In response to the "angelic face" remark made by Castle, Moran contends that he was not made aware of that "concept" when he was hired, but after viewing some photos of him and Carpenter on an A&E special, he "kind of sees what [Castle] means".

Stunt performer Dick Warlock played Michael Myers in Halloween II, replacing Castle who was beginning a career as a director. Warlock's previous experience in film was as a stunt double in films such as The Green Berets (1968), Jaws (1975) and the 1974 television series Kolchak: The Night Stalker. Warlock had not seen the original film before he was hired, but after getting the job he watched the film "two or three times", modeling his behavior after the few scenes Tommy Lee Wallace performed. Wallace portrayed the character in the scene where Michael attacks Laurie in the closet, and the scene where he sits up and turns toward Laurie, after having fallen down wounded from her counter-attack. Warlock modeled his movements for Halloween II after those scenes, as well as the scene where Michael tilts his head to the side while staring at the body of Bob stuck on the wall. Warlock took on Michael's characteristic "breathing", which was heard in the original film, while he was behind the mask. Debra Hill claims that although "the Shape" had no lines, Castle's portrayal gave them the presence that they wanted for the movie; she goes on to say that Dick Warlock was unable to emulate that presence, despite studying Castle's performance. George P. Wilbur did not study any of the previous Halloween films when he took over the role in The Return of Michael Myers.

Nick Castle would return to portray Michael in the 2018 sequel for select masked scenes. Newcomer James Jude Courtney would take over primary duties for the film and its subsequent sequels. Director and writer David Gordon Green explained to Courtney that he wanted his version of Michael to be an amalgamation of Castle's original performance and the addition of an efficient cat-like style of movement. Courtney used John Carpenter and Castle's work on the original film to determine how the 40 years that transpired between the events of the films would inform the character over time.

=== The mask ===
Tommy Lee Wallace, writer/director of Halloween III: Season of the Witch, was the production designer/co-editor on Halloween, and it was up to him to find "the perfect mask" for the Michael Myers character. The mask was intended to have a "blank face", and the William Shatner Halloween mask he found was exactly what he needed, "It didn't really look like anybody." Wallace cut the eyeholes larger and rounder, removed the eyebrows and sideburns, poofed up the hair so it looked "demented and strange" and finally spray-painted the mask white. Wallace explains, "It created a shiver right in the room, and we knew we had something special." John Carpenter claims that the mask looked nothing like Shatner whatsoever, but joked, "I guess I owe the success of Halloween to William Shatner." According to Jamie Lee Curtis, the mask needed to be a "human image", and the only thing in stores at the time that matched what they needed on set was the Shatner mask. Carpenter elaborates:

We didn't have any money to make a mask. It was originally written the way you see it, in other words, it's a pale mask with human features, almost featureless. I don't know why I wrote that down, why Debra and I decided on that, maybe it was because of an old movie called Eyes Without a Face. It's a French film, Franju made it, this girl had a burned face so she wore this face mask, it was real creepy because it was featureless and immobile except for her eyes. So Tommy Lee Wallace, our production designer, ran up to the mask shop on Hollywood Boulevard and bought a couple, one was a clown mask, and that's, you know, one way to go, and the other he got this William Shatner Star Trek mask; Captain Kirk.

Contrary to reports, the mask used in Halloween II was the same mask used in the original film. According to Dick Warlock, Debra Hill stored the original mask under her bed before she brought it to Warlock to wear. Warlock offers his opinion on why the mask looks different in the second film: "I think the lighting has a lot to do with the way the mask looks from film to film. The shape of my face is also totally different than [Nick] Castle's, [Tommy Lee] Wallace's or probably any of the other people who wore it in Halloween." The original mask has since been sold "to a man in Ohio. He has two haunted houses. One in Toledo and one in Tiffin. He had the mask and coveralls on display there this past October. I'm supposing he'll display them every year in one place or the other," according to Warlock. In 2017, the owner of the original mask identified himself as Mark Roberts, and provided new pictures of the mask as it appeared that year. Although Roberts pays to keep the prop in an airtight, climate-controlled storage case, the mask has significantly degraded over the years. Roberts stated that despite resisting for many years, he was considering a professional restoration.

Dominique Othenin-Girard, director of Halloween 5, began casting for the Michael Myers character using the Halloween 4 mask during auditions, but was "perplexed" with Don Shanks' performance. Girard wanted the character to "feel human and alive", but knew that without dialogue or facial expressions he would not be able to achieve his goal. Girard decide to use latex material to create new masks for Don Shanks, and the KNB special effects team attempted to go for a human interpretation of evil. Girard also felt it was necessary to distance himself from the "plastic, shiny look of the hockey mask of Friday the 13th". While the special effects team worked on the new masks, Girard requested that the team alter the traditional design of the nose, which he thought felt "too realistic and too normal, too round and soft, too much like a human nose". Girard wanted "the feel of a mask", something "unmovable, like a façade hiding a terrible secret behind steel".

Adam Arkin, who plays guidance counselor Will Brennan in Halloween H20, remarks, "There's something that's so minimalistic and so neutral about that face, that becomes sort of indelibly etched in your memory, number one. And I think number two, you're able to project any kind of frightening idea or image on top of it."

=== Characterization ===
"I met this six year old child with this blank, pale, emotionless face, and the blackest eyes; the devil's eyes [...] I realized what was living behind that boy's eyes was purely and simply…evil.'

— Loomis' description of a young Michael was inspired by John Carpenter's experience with a real life mental patient.

A common characterization is that Michael Myers is evil. John Carpenter has described the character as "almost a supernatural force—a force of nature. An evil force that's loose," a force that is "unkillable" Professor Nicholas Rogers elaborates, "Myers is depicted as a mythic, elusive bogeyman, one of superhuman strength who cannot be killed by bullets, stab wounds, or fire." Carpenter's inspiration for the "evil" that Michael would embody came when he was in college. While on a class trip at a mental institution in Kentucky, Carpenter visited "the most serious, mentally ill patients". Among those patients was a young boy around twelve to thirteen years-old. The boy gave this "schizophrenic stare", "a real evil stare", which Carpenter found "unsettling", "creepy", and "completely insane". Carpenter's experience would inspire the characterization Loomis would give of Michael to Sheriff Brackett in the original film. Debra Hill has stated the scene where Michael kills the Wallace's German Shepherd was done to illustrate how he is "really evil and deadly".

The ending scene of Michael being shot six times, and then disappearing from the ground outside the house, was meant to terrify the imagination of the audience. Carpenter tried to keep the audience guessing as to who Michael Myers really is—he is gone, and everywhere at the same time; he is more than human; he may be supernatural, and no one knows how he got that way. To Carpenter, keeping the audience guessing was better than explaining away the character with "he's cursed by some..." For Josh Hartnett, who portrayed John Tate in Halloween H20, "it's that abstract, it's easier for me to be afraid of it. You know, someone who just kind of appears and, you know [Mimics stabbing noise from Psycho] instead of an actual human who you think you can talk to. And no remorse, it's got no feelings, that's the most frightening, definitely." Richard Schickel, film critic for TIME, felt Michael was "irrational" and "really angry about something", having what Schickel referred to as "a kind of primitive, obsessed intelligence". Schickel considered this the "definition of a good monster", by making the character appear "less than human", but having enough intelligence "to be dangerous".

"Michael Myers is enduring because he's pure evil."

— Steve Miner

Dominique Othenin-Girard attempted to have audiences "relate to 'Evil', to Michael Myers's 'ill' side". Girard wanted Michael to appear "more human [...] even vulnerable, with contradicting feelings inside of him". He illustrated these feelings with a scene where Michael removes his mask and sheds a tear. Girard explains, "Again, to humanize him, to give him a tear. If Evil or in this case our boogeyman knows pain, or love or demonstrate a feeling of regrets; he becomes even more scary to me if he pursue his malefic action. He shows an evil determination beyond his feelings. Dr. Loomis tries to reach his emotional side several times in [Halloween 5]. He thinks he could cure Michael through his feelings."

Daniel Farrands, writer of The Curse of Michael Myers, describes the character as a "sexual deviant". According to him, the way Michael follows girls around and watches them contains a subtext of repressed sexuality. Farrands theorizes that, as a child, Michael became fixated on the murder of his sister Judith, and for his own twisted reasons felt the need to repeat that action over and over again, finding a sister-like figure in Laurie who excited him sexually. He also believes that by revealing Laurie to be Michael's literal sister, the sequels took away from the simplicity and relatability of the original Halloween. Nevertheless, when writing Curse, Farrands was tasked with creating a mythology for Michael which defined his motives and why he could not be killed. He says, "He can't just be a man anymore, he's gone beyond that. He's mythical. He's supernatural. So, I took it from that standpoint that there's something else driving him. A force that goes beyond that five senses that has infected this boy's soul and now is driving him." As the script developed and more people became involved, Farrands admits that the film went too far in explaining Michael Myers and that he himself was not completely satisfied with the finished product.

Michael does not speak in the films; the first time audiences ever hear his voice is in the 2007 remake. Michael speaks as a child during the beginning of the film, but while in Smith's Grove he stops talking completely. Rob Zombie originally planned to have the adult Michael speak to Laurie in the film's finale, simply saying his childhood nickname for her, "Boo". Zombie explained that this version was not used because he was afraid having the character talk at that point would demystify him too much, and because the act of Michael handing Laurie the photograph of them together was enough.

Describing aspects of Michael Myers which he wanted to explore in the comic book Halloween: Nightdance, writer Stefan Hutchinson mentions the character's "bizarre and dark sense of humor", as seen when he wore a sheet over his head to trick a girl into thinking he was her boyfriend, and the satisfaction he gets from scaring the characters before he murders them, such as letting Laurie know he is stalking her. Hutchinson feels there is a perverse nature to Michael's actions: "see the difference between how he watches and pursues women to men". He also suggests that Michael Myers' hometown of Haddonfield is the cause of his behaviour, likening his situation to that of Jack the Ripper, citing Myers as a "product of normal surburbia—all the repressed emotion of fake Norman Rockwell smiles". Hutchinson describes Michael as a "monster of abjection". When asked his opinion of Rob Zombie's expansion on Michael's family life, Hutchinson says that explaining why Michael does what he does "[reduces] the character". That being said, Hutchinson explores the nature of evil in the short story Charlie—included in the Halloween Nightdance trade paperback—and says that Michael Myers spent fifteen years "attuning himself to this force to the point where he is, as Loomis says, 'pure evil'". Nightdance artist Tim Seeley describes the character's personality in John Carpenter's 1978 film as "a void", which allows the character to be more open to interpretation than the later sequels allotted him. He surmises that Michael embodies a part of everyone; a part people are afraid will one day "snap and knife someone", which lends to the fear that Michael creates on screen.

A study was conducted by California State University's Media Psychology Lab, on the psychological appeal of movie monsters—Vampires, Freddy Krueger, Frankenstein's monster, Jason Voorhees, Godzilla, Chucky, Hannibal Lecter, King Kong, and The Alien—which surveyed 1,166 people nationwide (United States), with ages ranging from 16 to 91. It was published in the Journal of Media Psychology. In the survey, Michael was considered to be the "embodiment of pure evil"; when compared to the other characters, Michael Myers was rated the highest. Michael was characterized lending to the understanding of insanity, being ranked second to Hannibal Lecter in this category; he also placed first as the character who shows audiences the "dark side of human nature". He was rated second in the category "monster enjoys killing" by the participants, and believed to have "superhuman strength". Michael was rated highest among the characters in the "monster is an outcast" category.

== See also ==
- Boogeyman
