= Halloween (2018 film) =

2018 film by David Gordon Green

- Theatrical release poster
- Directed by: David Gordon Green
- Written by: Jeff Fradley; Danny McBride; David Gordon Green
- Based on: Characters by: John Carpenter; Debra Hill
- Produced by: Malek Akkad; Jason Blum; Bill Block
- Starring: Jamie Lee Curtis; Judy Greer; Andi Matichak; Will Patton; Haluk Bilginer; Virginia Gardner
- Cinematography: Michael Simmonds
- Edited by: Tim Alverson
- Music by: John Carpenter; Cody Carpenter; Daniel Davies
- Production companies: Miramax; Blumhouse Productions; Trancas International Films; Rough House Pictures
- Distributed by: Universal Pictures
- Release dates: September 8, 2018 (TIFF); October 19, 2018 (United States)
- Running time: 106 minutes
- Country: United States
- Language: English
- Budget: $10 million
- Box office: $259.9 million

Halloween is a 2018 American slasher film directed by David Gordon Green, who co-wrote it with Jeff Fradley and Danny McBride. It is the eleventh installment in the Halloween film series and a direct sequel to Halloween (1978), ignoring the events of every other film in the franchise. The film stars Jamie Lee Curtis reprising her role as Laurie Strode. James Jude Courtney portrays Michael Myers, with Nick Castle returning to the role for a cameo appearance. Halloween also stars Judy Greer, Andi Matichak, Will Patton, Haluk Bilginer, and Virginia Gardner. The plot follows a post-traumatic Laurie Strode who prepares to face an escaped Michael Myers in a final showdown on Halloween night forty years after she survived his killing spree.

After the release of Rob Zombie's Halloween II, the 2009 sequel to the 2007 remake of the original, another follow-up went into development from former rights holder Dimension Films, but did not come to fruition. As a result, the studio lost the rights to the intellectual property, which were later obtained by Blumhouse Productions with John Carpenter's involvement. Carpenter, who disagreed with the remake's portrayal of lead killer Michael Myers, planned on helping the studio to make the next Halloween film into what he believed to be more terrifying than the preceding sequels. Filmmakers David Gordon Green and Danny McBride, who were already fans, proposed their vision to Blumhouse and Carpenter. It was accepted and developed into a sequel to the original.

Halloween was filmed from January to February 2018 in Charleston, South Carolina, before reshoots took place that June. The film premiered at the Toronto International Film Festival on September 8, 2018. It was theatrically released in North America on October 19, 2018, by Universal Pictures. The film received generally positive reviews from critics with praise for Curtis' performance, Green's direction, scares, and tone, with many deeming it both the best Halloween film since the original and a return-to-form for the series. It was a box office success, grossing over $259 million worldwide on a $10 million budget. Upon its release, Halloween became the highest-grossing slasher film in unadjusted dollars, breaking the record Scream had previously set in 1996, as well as setting several other box office records. The film was followed by two sequels: Halloween Kills (2021) and Halloween Ends (2022).

== Plot ==
On October 29, 2018, infamous serial killer Michael Myers, who has been institutionalized at Smith's Grove Psychiatric Hospital for 40 years following his killing spree in Haddonfield, (Note: As depicted in Halloween (1978)) is being prepared for transfer to a different facility named Glass Hill. True crime podcasters Aaron Korey and Dana Haines visit the hospital, where Aaron displays Michael's mask to him, to no effect.

In Haddonfield, Laurie Strode still lives in fear of him, drinking heavily and rarely leaving her heavily fortified house. She has a strained relationship with her daughter Karen, whom the state took away from her when Karen was 12. Allyson, Laurie's granddaughter, tries to maintain a relationship with her grandmother. The night of October 30, as Michael is being transferred, the bus crashes and Michael escapes after murdering a father and son, stealing their truck.

On the morning of October 31, Michael sees Aaron and Dana visiting his sister Judith's grave. He kills them both, as well as a mechanic for his overalls, before recovering his mask from Aaron's car. Laurie learns of Michael's escape and attempts to warn Karen, but Karen dismisses her concerns, urging Laurie to move on.

That night, Allyson finds her boyfriend, Cameron, cheating on her at a party and leaves with his friend Oscar. Allyson's best friend Vicky and her boyfriend Dave meet up with each other, while the former is babysitting a boy named Julian. Michael ambushes Vicky from the closet and is killed while Julian runs away. Dave is killed when he attempts to intervene. Deputy Frank Hawkins, who arrested Michael in 1978, and Laurie overhear the incident on radio and go over to the house. Laurie attempts to shoot Michael before he flees, but misses. The police take Laurie, Karen, and her husband Ray to Laurie's home for protection.

Dr. Ranbir Sartain, Michael's psychiatrist and former student of Dr. Samuel Loomis, persuades Sheriff Barker to help in the hunt for Michael. Michael kills Oscar, but Hawkins and Sartain rescue Allyson. Deputy Hawkins incapacitates Michael and tries to kill him, but Dr. Sartain—who has become obsessed with Michael—attacks and leaves Hawkins for dead. It is revealed that he orchestrated Michael's escape to study him "in the wild". Dr. Sartain heads toward Laurie's home with Michael and Allyson locked in the backseat together. Michael wakes up and kills Sartain while Allyson flees. Michael then kills the two police officers stationed outside Laurie's home and strangles Ray to death.

In Michael's showdown with Laurie, he stabs her and pushes her over a balcony. When he turns back to check after being distracted by the sound of Allyson arriving, Laurie has vanished, reminiscent of their first encounter decades earlier. Karen shoots him in the cheek before Laurie traps him inside the safe room with Karen and Allyson's help. The trio sets the house ablaze, and Laurie says goodbye to Michael. As her family takes her to the hospital, a final shot of the burning basement is shown, with Michael nowhere in sight. During the end of the credits, Michael's breathing is heard, indicating that he has survived.

== Cast ==
- Jamie Lee Curtis as Laurie Strode, the sole survivor of Michael Myers' 1978 killing spree, suffering from post-traumatic stress disorder
- Judy Greer as Karen Nelson (née Strode), Laurie's estranged daughter
  - Sophia Miller as young Karen
- Andi Matichak as Allyson Nelson, Karen's daughter and Laurie's granddaughter
- James Jude Courtney as Michael Myers / The Shape, the masked figure who carried out a horrific massacre on Halloween in 1978, and returns to Haddonfield for another killing spree
  - Nick Castle as Michael Myers (window scene and breathing sounds)
- Haluk Bilginer as Dr. Ranbir Sartain, Michael's psychiatrist and Samuel Loomis's former student
- Will Patton as Deputy Frank Hawkins, a sheriff's deputy who teams up with Laurie in an effort to kill Michael and had arrested Michael after his killing spree in 1978
- Rhian Rees as Dana Haines, a true-crime podcaster and Aaron's partner
- Jefferson Hall as Aaron Korey, a true-crime podcaster and Dana's partner
- Toby Huss as Ray Nelson, Karen's husband, Allyson's father and Laurie's son-in-law
- Virginia Gardner as Vicky, Allyson's best friend
- Dylan Arnold as Cameron Elam, Allyson's boyfriend and son of Lonnie Elam
- Miles Robbins as Dave, Vicky's boyfriend
- Drew Scheid as Oscar, Cameron's best friend
- Jibrail Nantambu as Julian Morrisey, a little boy whom Vicky babysits
- Michael Harrity as Warden Kuneman
- Omar Dorsey as Sheriff Barker, Haddonfield's sheriff
- Charlie Benton as Officer Richards
- Christopher Allen Nelson as Officer Francis

In addition, P. J. Soles, who played Lynda Van Der Klok in the original 1978 film, has an off-screen voice cameo as Allyson's English teacher.

== Production ==
=== Development ===
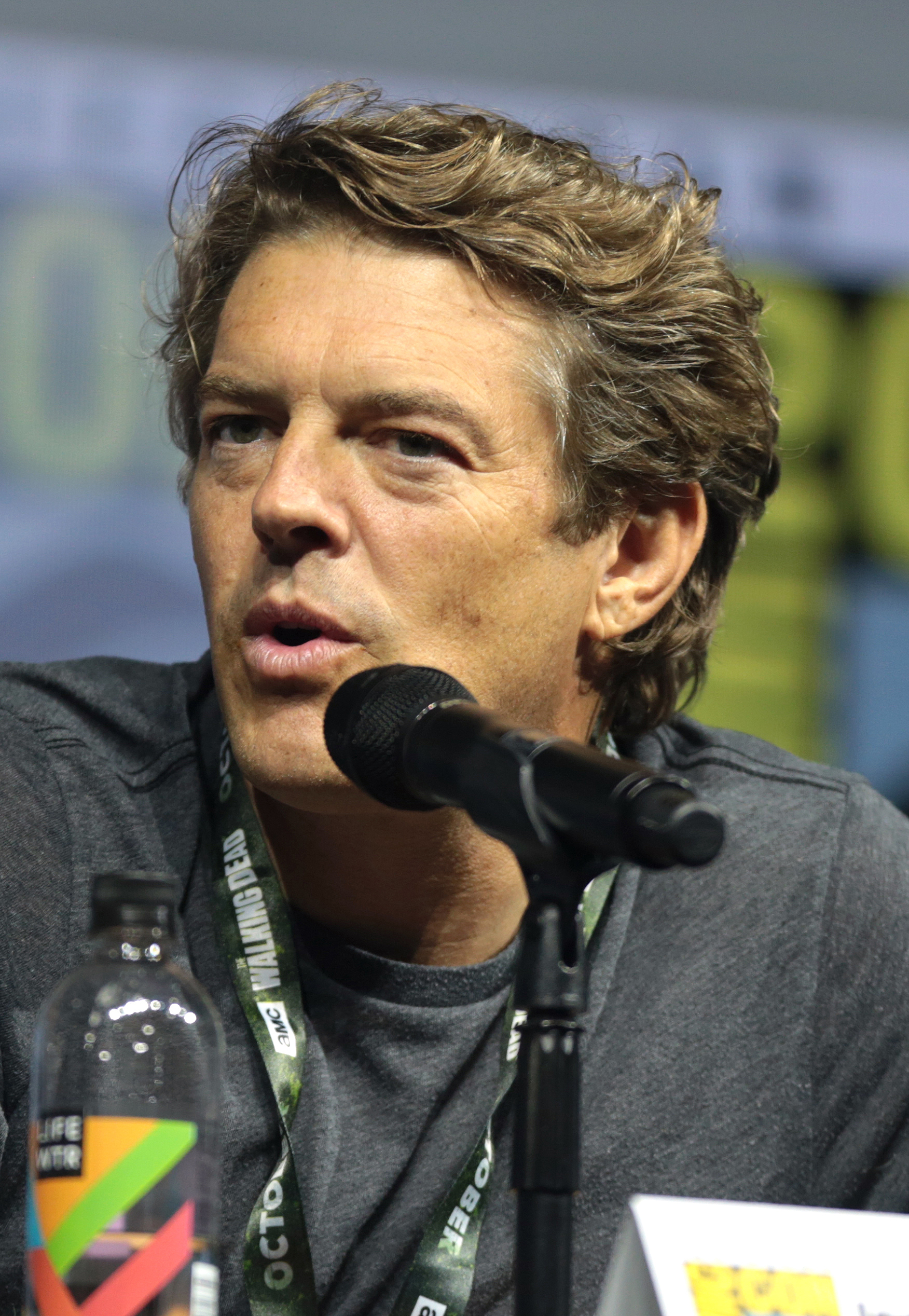
Producer Jason Blum

After directing the 2007 Halloween reboot, Rob Zombie was hesitant to return for Halloween II and announced that he would not return to direct another sequel while promoting it in an interview on MTV. Nevertheless, two days after its release, The Weinstein Company announced that a sequel entitled Halloween 3D would be released in the summer of 2010. Patrick Lussier and Todd Farmer were hired as the film's director and writer and the studio planned for filming to begin in Shreveport, Louisiana, in November 2009. The film was to pick up where the final frame of its 2009 predecessor left off and would pay homage to the original version of Michael Myers from the 1978 film. It would have involved Laurie Strode being committed to a psychiatric hospital after murdering Dr. Loomis and Sheriff Brackett and Michael tracking her down there one year later. Tyler Mane would have reprised his role as Michael Myers from the first two films and Tom Atkins would have been cast as a psychiatrist, but Scout Taylor-Compton did not plan on returning as Laurie Strode. After disagreements over the budget and concerns that the film was being made too quickly, Bob Weinstein delayed pre-production until after Lussier and Farmer finished their work on Drive Angry.

In June 2011, development resumed with a planned release date of October 26, 2012, but was again delayed when Lussier, Farmer and Weinstein decided to prioritize a Hellraiser reboot. In 2012, Siren screenwriters Ben Collins and Luke Piotrowski pitched their take on a reboot of the series, simply entitled Halloween. By 2013, Josh Stolberg was tasked with revising a 2004 draft for Halloween: Asylum, previously written by Mirrors 2 scribe Matt Veene. According to Stolberg, the script was a direct continuation of Halloween: Resurrection, and featured Myers breaking free from death row. In May 2014, development on Halloween 3D was revived for one final time with Taylor-Compton agreeing to appear in the film. As a result of the profitability of the Paranormal Activity franchise in the 2010s, Weinstein insisted on making Halloween 3D a found footage film, and Farmer pitched a mockumentary about a series of murders by a deranged fan taking place during the making of an in-universe film based on Lussier and Farmer's original script. According to Farmer and Taylor-Compton, none of the cast and crew involved liked the concept, and the film was ultimately scrapped.

In February 2015, Patrick Melton and Marcus Dunstan were reported as writing a new Halloween film, described as a "recalibration" rather than a reboot, which Malek Akkad and Matt Stein were producing. On June 15, 2015, The Weinstein Company was reported to be moving ahead with another Halloween sequel, tentatively titled Halloween Returns, with Dunstan directing. It would have been a standalone film set to reintroduce audiences to Michael Myers years after his initial rampage from Halloween and 1981's Halloween II, as he was confronted by a new generation of victims while on death row. The film would have been set in 1988 and involved Michael Myers escaping his execution from a power surge and going on a rampage in the town of Russellville, Illinois.

On October 22, 2015, producer Malek Akkad revealed that the production of Halloween Returns had been postponed, citing "issues with studios and different variables", and stating that the extra time would result in a better film. Akkad later revealed that he had postponed production because the studio insisted on shooting the film in Serbia, which he believed would be a poor fit for Haddonfield. In December 2015, it was announced that Dimension Films no longer had the filming rights to Halloween, after Halloween Returns failed to go into production on schedule. The film's cancellation was confirmed at the same time. The rights then reverted to Miramax.

On May 24, 2016, Blumhouse Productions and Miramax were announced to be co-financing a new film, with Universal Pictures distributing through the studio's output deal with Blumhouse. Blumhouse CEO Jason Blum called the original Halloween a milestone that had influenced the company to begin making horror films, "The great Malek Akkad and John Carpenter have a special place in the hearts of all genre fans and we are so excited that Miramax brought us together". The rights specifically went to Miramax and Tarik Akkad, who sought out Blum because of his success as a horror film producer. That same month, Mike Flanagan was being courted to direct the film with a set release date for 2017. Flanagan would ultimately pass on the offer and likened his pitch to his own film Hush.

=== Writing and pre-production ===
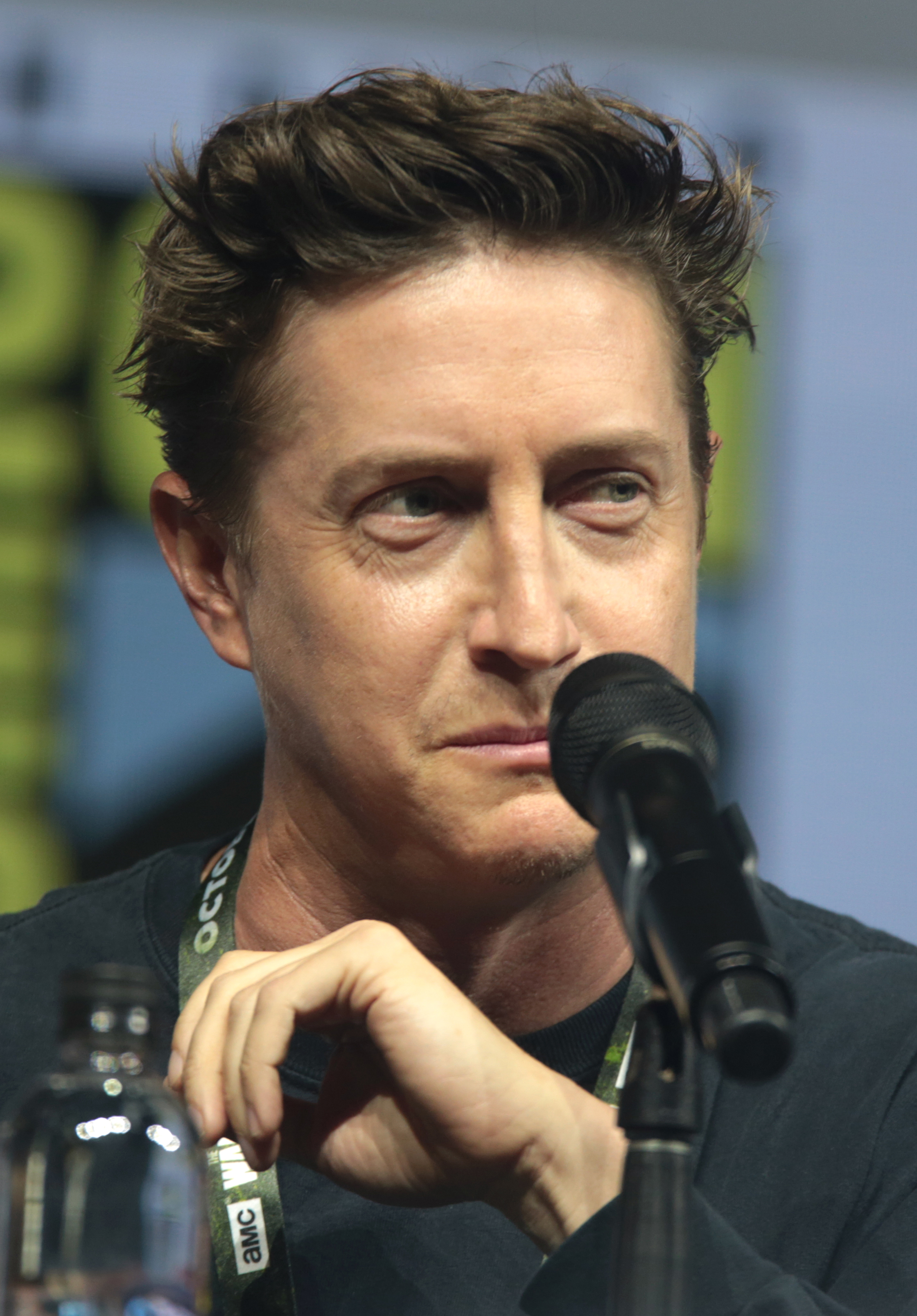
Director and co-writer David Gordon Green

When John Carpenter, who had co-written the first two Halloween films with Debra Hill and directed the original, signed on as an executive producer in 2016, he described his intention: "Thirty-eight years after the original Halloween, I'm going to help to try to make the 10th sequel the scariest of them all." He discussed his reasoning for revisiting the series for the first time since producing 1982's Halloween III: Season of the Witch in an interview with Rotten Tomatoes, "I talked about the Halloweens for a long time, the sequels — I haven't even seen all of them [...] But finally it occurred to me: Well if I'm just flapping my gums here, why don't I try to make it as good as I can? So, you know, stop throwing rocks from the sidelines and get in there and try to do something positive." When the rights were acquired by Blumhouse, filmmaker Adam Wingard discussed making a new Halloween film, but ultimately dropped out after being sated by an email of encouragement from Carpenter, "I kinda walked away from it like, I just got everything I wanted out of this job. 'This is about as good as it gets.'" On February 9, 2017, David Gordon Green and Danny McBride were announced as handling screenwriting duties, with Green directing and Carpenter advising the project. Carpenter said that he was impressed with the pitch presented by the co-writers, solicited by Jason Blum, proclaiming that "They get it." Green and McBride brought along their UNCSA colleague Jeff Fradley to co-write the script alongside them.

Rather than reboot the series again, they initially chose to focus primarily on continuing the mythology of the first two films when developing the story, with Danny McBride stating, "We all came to the decision that remaking something that already works isn't a good idea. So we just have a reimagining instead." The pitch was created by the writers specifically to present to Carpenter, as they were self-described fans of the original Halloween. The story was eventually fleshed out so that all of the sequels were ignored from the new film's continuity, and the ending of the first film was retconned in what McBride likened to an alternate reality. However, he later said that the film still pays tribute to the other follow-ups, despite sharing no continuity, "you know like there's so many different versions, and the timeline is so mixed up, we just thought it would be easier to go back to the source and continue from there. It was nicer than knowing you're working on Halloween 11, it just seemed cooler, 'we're making Halloween 2'. For fans, we pay homage and respect to every Halloween that has been out there."

Despite Green and McBride's comedy roots, Halloween was distanced from the comedy genre. McBride further elaborated that "I think there was, like, maybe one joke on the page, but the rest is straight horror." Believing that "good horror movie directors are good directors", Jason Blum hired Green for his perceived "amazing" storytelling. No major steps were taken without Carpenter's approval, including the acceptance of the initial pitch and bringing back actress Jamie Lee Curtis. Displeased with Rob Zombie's re-imagining and added backstory of murderer Michael Myers, Carpenter wanted to take the character back to his more mysterious roots, describing him as "a force of nature. He's supposed to be almost supernatural." McBride detailed his approach as humanizing the character, "I think we're just trying to take it back to what was so good about the original. It was just very simple and just achieved that level of horror that wasn't turning Michael Myers into some being that couldn't be killed. I want to be scared by something that I really think could happen. I think it's much more horrifying to be scared by someone standing in the shadows while you're taking the trash out."

Early on, the script for the film had Laurie's daughter Jamie Lloyd from the original continuity's Halloween 4 and Halloween 5 appear alongside Laurie for the first time. However, subsequent rewrites changed her to 'Karen'. Even before those early plans were publicly known, Danielle Harris, who played Jamie, objected, feeling strongly about Laurie having a daughter that was not Jamie, but her appeals to the production company were dismissed. Another early draft included a reimagining of the original film's ending where Laurie shoots The Shape off the balcony after he murders Loomis. However, Green would ultimately back down from the decision. Altogether, the writing team wrote eighty drafts of the script over the span of eight months, with rewrites taking place up until the last week of filming.

=== Casting ===
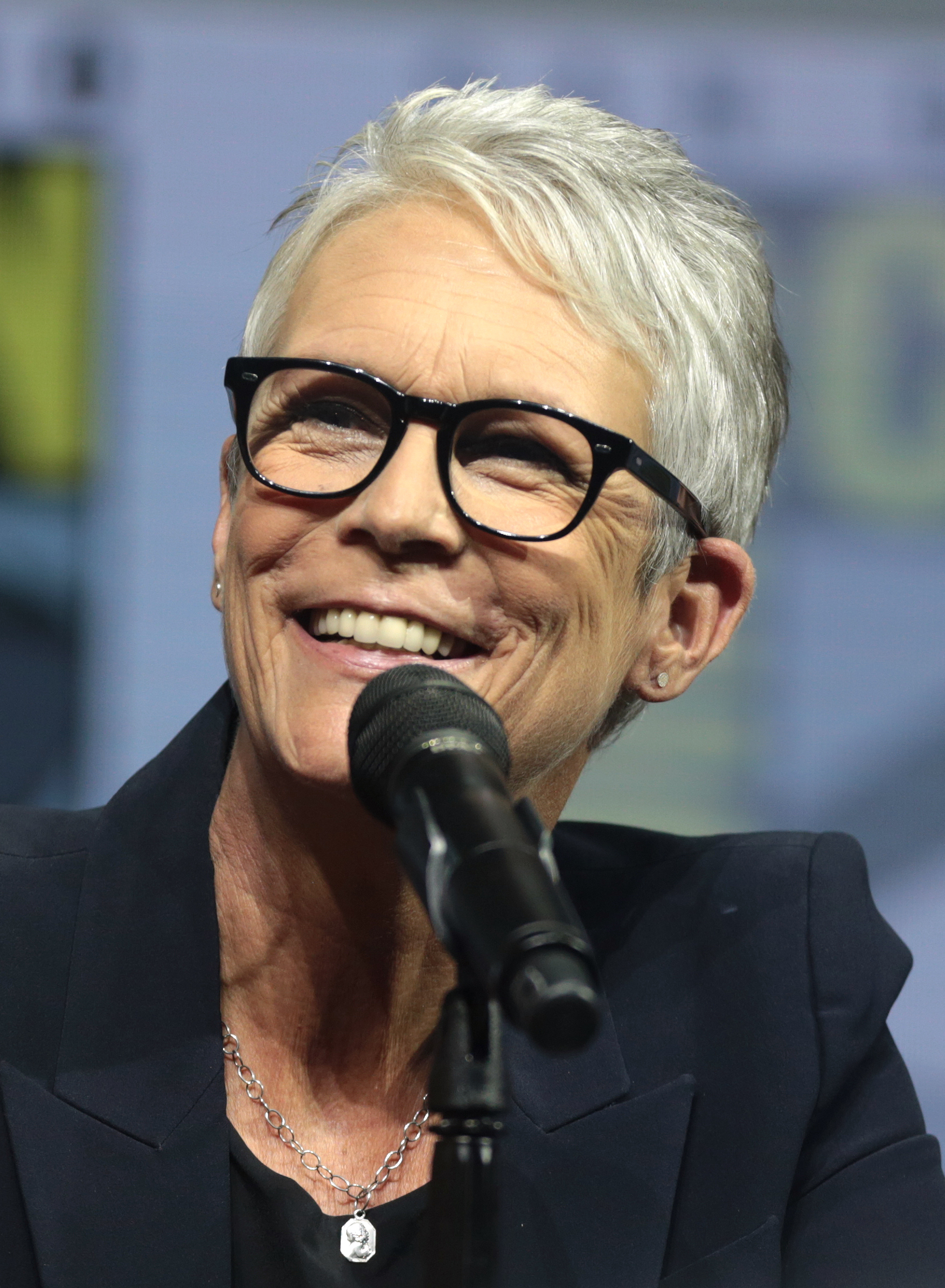
Jamie Lee Curtis reprises her role as Laurie Strode.

In September 2017, Jamie Lee Curtis confirmed that she would reprise her role as Laurie Strode. In contrast to the character's final girl role in the original film, Laurie armed herself and prepared extensively in the time period between films in case Michael Myers returned. Although Halloween II and its later installments have portrayed Myers as a familicidal killer and Laurie as his sister, the writers felt that the added motive made him less frightening as a killer. As such, they intentionally ignored that aspect of the lore. In the film, Laurie's granddaughter Allyson explains how her life has been impacted by Michael's homicidal rampage 40 years earlier. When a friend hints that he had heard Michael was Laurie's brother, Allyson replies, "No, it was not her brother. That was something people made up." The writers did not originally know if Curtis would be willing to return, according to McBride, so they "busted [their] ass on this script to really make that Laurie Strode character something she wouldn't be able to say no to." On why she returned, Curtis stated, "As soon as I read what David Green and Danny McBride had come up with [...] and the way that they connected the dots of the story, it made so much sense to me that it felt totally appropriate for me to return to Haddonfield, Ill., for another 40th-anniversary retelling. It's the original story in many, many, many ways. Just retold 40 years later with my granddaughter." Curtis had previously returned as Laurie in the sequels Halloween II (1981), Halloween H20: 20 Years Later (1998), and Halloween: Resurrection (2002). The following October, Judy Greer entered negotiations to play Laurie's daughter, Karen Nelson. On December 7, 2017, Andi Matichak was cast to play Laurie's granddaughter Allyson.

Danielle Harris, who played Jamie Lloyd in the original continuity's Halloween 4 and Halloween 5, contacted Blumhouse with the offer to reprise her role in some way, but the studio went with a different daughter character. Harris and certain horror publications expressed their disappointment: "I was okay with it when she had a son [...] but they're saying it's the last one and [...] she has a daughter. And it's not Jamie. It's just kind of a bummer, I guess."

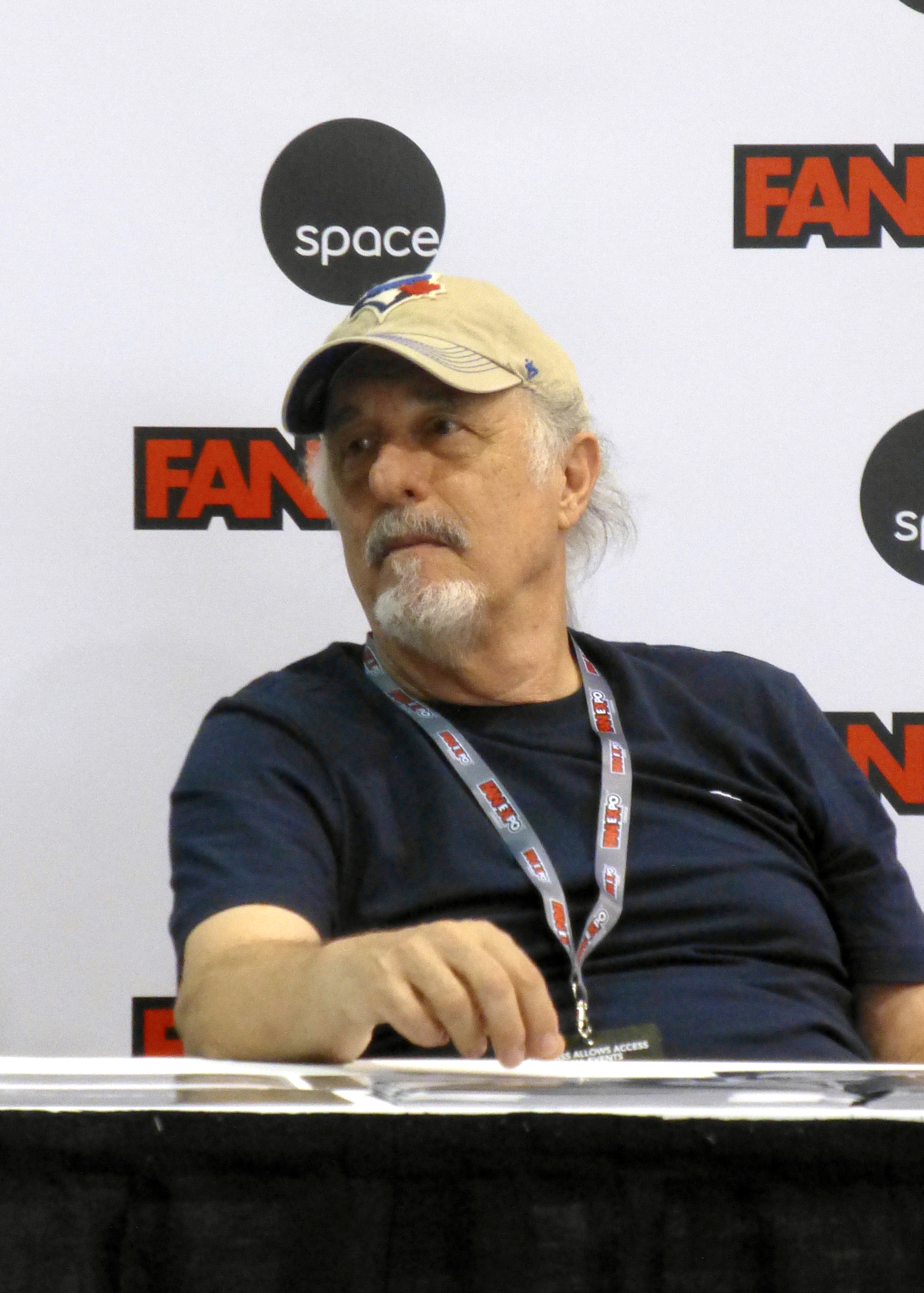
Nick Castle reprises his role as Michael Myers for the first time in forty years.

On December 20, 2017, it was announced that Nick Castle, who had portrayed Michael Myers in the original film, would reprise his role, with actor and stuntman James Jude Courtney set to portray Myers as well. Courtney was suggested to Malek Akkad and David Gordon Green by stunt coordinator Rawn Hutchinson for his ability to do both physical stunts and genuine acting, auditioning afterwards and receiving a phone call in December 2017 affirming that he had landed the role. Green explained to him his vision for Myers's mannerisms, an amalgamation of Castle's original performance and the addition of an efficient cat-like style of movement. Courtney tailored his portrayal to those specifications from observing an actual cat, "I think cats are the most perfect hunting machines on the planet. And the beauty of it is we don't judge a cat for what a cat does. So I sort of carried that movement and the non-judgmental approach to the way I moved as The Shape, which I learned from my cat Parcival." He referred to collaborating with Castle as an "honor", while Castle described it as a "passing of the torch". Courtney used John Carpenter and Castle's work on the original film to determine how the 40 years that transpired between the events of the films would inform the character over time. The December 2017 announcement of Castle's participation was widely reported as his retaking the role of Myers he originated, with Courtney only doing additional work as the character.

On January 13, 2018, Virginia Gardner, Miles Robbins, Dylan Arnold and Drew Scheid were confirmed to play Allyson's friends. On January 16, 2018, Will Patton was publicized to have joined the film's roster. He was later joined by Rob Niter, both actors being announced to portray police officers, as well as British actress Rhian Rees, who was cast as a character named Dana. Speaking of the cast, Castle stated that "What I like about this (new film) is they've got some really good young actors. They fleshed out the relationship of Jamie's character with her daughter and her granddaughter. And they made some choices that I think are really bold choices about who these people are and why they are the way they are now."

On July 27, 2018, it was announced that a sound-alike actor would provide a voice-over for Dr. Sam Loomis, who was originally portrayed by Donald Pleasence in the original film, Halloween II, Halloween 4: The Return of Michael Myers (1988), Halloween 5: The Revenge of Michael Myers (1989), Halloween: The Curse of Michael Myers (1995), before his death in 1995. In the film, the voice of Dr. Loomis is heard giving advice that Michael be executed, claiming that Michael needed to be killed because there was no point in keeping evil alive. Loomis is featured in a vocal cameo when Aaron and Dana listen to a recording of Loomis, made three months after the events of the original film. Loomis is voiced by sound-alike stand-up comedian Colin Mahan, who was used to do Donald Pleasence impressions. Mahan was hired after one of the film's executive producers heard him by chance and suggested him for the part. At Carpenter's suggestion, Green, McBride and Fradley initially wrote some drafts where Loomis was more involved in the story, appearing onscreen at the beginning of the film, with the trio devising to cast their art director Sean White as Loomis due to his look-alike resemblance to Pleasence, but the idea went unused for it. The sequel, Halloween Kills (2021), ended up incorporating this concept, but with Tom Jones Jr. instead for that film's 1978 flashbacks. Additionally, P. J. Soles, who had portrayed Lynda van der Klok, Michael's final victim in the original film, had cameo appearance as a teacher.

=== Filming ===
Principal production was originally set to start in late October 2017. It got delayed until January 13, 2018, and began in Charleston, South Carolina. Michael Simmonds served cinematography duties, with Paul Daley and Stewart Cantrell operating the camera. According to Danny McBride, the horror of the film aims to create a sense of tension and dread to the audience rather than relying on graphic violence; the make-up and visual effects were provided by Christopher Nelson. Jamie Lee Curtis finished her scenes on February 16, 2018, with the remaining principal photography concluding on February 19, 2018. Response to the film's first test screening led the filmmakers to schedule reshoots beginning June 11, 2018. Filming once again took place in Charleston.

Courtney had a week of rehearsal before filming began. Nelson used a life cast of his face to construct the Michael Myers mask and other prosthetics worn by the actor. The mask was weathered and aged to reflect the character's "authentic evolution" since the original. Courtney was involved in every scene featuring Myers, including those of Nick Castle, who was only involved for a minimal amount of filming, which Castle described to the journalists on set as a cameo appearance: "Jim is our Michael Myers now." Castle reprises his role in one scene with Curtis, playing as the character's reflection in a window and did all of Michael Myers' breathing sounds in post-production. Castle expressed that it was the filmmakers' intention to maintain the atmosphere of the original and that, like the 1978 film, "it's very neighborhood-centric [...] There are a lot of things coinciding (in the new film) that feel like clever ways to introduce a kind of déjà vu of the first one, without feeling like it's being copied. It was the first thing out of their mouths really: 'We want to do it like John [Carpenter] did it.'"

Nelson accompanied Courtney throughout filming, providing him with acting advice from his own knowledge of the characters of the Halloween films. Nelson had been interviewed and examined for the film by Akkad and Green after a conversation with Blumhouse producer Ryan Turek, who he was already acquainted with. Collaborating with fellow make-up effects artist Vincent Van Dyke, some of his designs and concepts were initially rejected due to legal complications, which were later straightened out as he began his work on the film. Rather than trying to copy the design of the original mask, he intended on recapturing what he described as the visual "feeling" of it. Because the film is set forty years after the events of the original, he studied the decomposition and wrinkling of forty-year-old masks over time while outlining his take on Myers's look, "You're not creating just a mask. You're creating a feeling that you get that does have an expression [...] But also the mask looks completely different in every single angle it's ever been photographed at, and I wanted that feeling too." Courtney was hired after Nelson advised Green not to cast a hulking stuntman in the role in compliance with the first film.

=== Music ===
After previously providing the score for the original Halloween, Halloween II, and Halloween III: Season of the Witch, John Carpenter confirmed in October 2017 that he had made a deal to score the 2018 release. Regarding his take on the sequel, he said, "I'll be consulting with the director to see what he feels. I could create a new score, we could update the old score and amplify it, or we could combine those two things. I'll have to see the movie to see what it requires." The album was released on October 19, 2018.

== Release ==
=== Theatrical ===
Halloween had its world premiere at the Toronto International Film Festival on September 8, 2018, as part of its Midnight Madness section. It was theatrically released on October 19, a week before the 40th anniversary of the original installment's release.

=== Marketing ===
Universal claims to have spent an estimated $75.5 million on advertising for Halloween. The CinemaCon film convention premiered exclusive footage on April 25, 2018, garnering positive reactions from those in attendance. The film had a presentation at San Diego Comic-Con in Hall H on July 20, 2018, with Jamie Lee Curtis, David Gordon Green, Malek Akkad, and Jason Blum in attendance. During the panel, which featured an extended scene and trailer, Curtis discussed how the film ties in with the MeToo movement, describing it as a film about "trauma", stating, "[Laurie's] taking back her narrative. She has carried the trauma and PTSD of someone who was attacked [...] And there comes a point where you say, I am not a victim. And this is a person who has been waiting 40 years [for the chance]." The first trailer for the film was released on June 8, 2018, followed by a second trailer on September 5, 2018. Trick or Treat Studios obtained the official costume licensing rights for the film. Both Nelson and Vincent Van Dyke joined their design team, who used toolings from the screen-used mold of Michael Myers's mask to adapt it for mass market sale.

=== Home media ===
Halloween was released digitally on December 28, 2018, and was released on 4K Ultra HD Blu-ray, Blu-ray, and DVD on January 15, 2019.

== Reception ==
=== Box office ===
Halloween grossed $159.3 million in the United States and Canada, and $100.6 million in other territories, for a total worldwide gross of $259.9 million. Deadline Hollywood calculated the net profit of the film to be $128.5 million, when factoring together all expenses and revenues.

In the United States and Canada, Halloween was projected to gross $57–65 million from 3,928 theaters in its opening weekend. The film made $7.7 million from Thursday night previews, the fourth-highest ever for an R-rated horror film after It, It Chapter Two and Paranormal Activity 3. Halloween then grossed $33.3 million on its first day (including previews) and went on to debut to $76.2 million, marking the second-best ever opening weekend of October behind Venom, the biggest debut for Blumhouse at the time (later surpassed by Five Nights at Freddy's in 2023, also made by Blumhouse), and the highest of the Halloween franchise. Its opening performance was also the best-ever for a film starring a lead actress over 55 years old. With its weekend performance alone, the film became the highest-grossing of the franchise. The film dropped 58% in its second weekend but retained the top spot, grossing $32 million. After making $5.5 million on Halloween day (a Wednesday), the film then made $10.8 million in its third weekend, falling to fifth.

Worldwide, it earned around $100 million, including $12–30 million from 21 markets internationally. It ended up having a global opening weekend of $90.5 million, including $14.3 million from outside the United States. The largest markets were Mexico ($5 million), Australia ($4.8 million), the United Kingdom ($3.6 million) and Russia ($1.8 million). The film made another $25.6 million from international markets in its second weekend, for a running total of $45.6 million.

=== Critical response ===
On the review aggregator website Rotten Tomatoes, the film holds an approval rating of 79% based on 385 reviews, and an average rating of 6.8/10. The site's critical consensus reads, "Halloween largely wipes the slate clean after decades of disappointing sequels, ignoring increasingly elaborate mythology in favor of basic – yet still effective – ingredients." On Metacritic, the film has a weighted average score of 67 out of 100, based on 51 reviews, indicating "generally favorable" reviews. Audiences polled by CinemaScore gave the film an average grade of "B+" on an A+ to F scale, and those at PostTrak gave it an overall 75% positive score, with 65% saying they would definitely recommend it, while the social media monitor RelishMix noted a "positive buzz" response to the film online.

Peter Debruge of Variety felt that the film brings the series back to its roots, calling it "an act of fan service disguised as a horror movie. The fact it works as both means that [director] Green [...] has pulled off what he set out to do, tying up the mythology that Carpenter and company established, while delivering plenty of fresh suspense — and grisly-creative kills — for younger audiences". Writing for The Verge, Bryan Bishop said the film was "better than almost every other sequel in the franchise" and "a fitting coda to a story that began 40 years ago", while Leah Greenblatt of Entertainment Weekly described it as "a faithful, fundamental sequel (and funny too)". In his review for Bloody Disgusting, Joe Lipsett wrote, "All in all, Halloween is a worthy entry in the franchise [...] Everything really clicks at the finale, which makes sense considering the film exists to pit Laurie against Michael. And in this capacity, Halloween doesn't disappoint". Jonathan Barkan of Dread Central wrote, "Halloween pays loving and respectful homage to the 1978 original while making a very bold and decisive claim for its own existence [...] this is quite possibly the scariest Michael Myers has ever been."

In a mixed review, Eric Kohn of IndieWire criticized the film's dialogue and staging, but said "Carpenter's own Halloween was itself a bumpy ride, made on the cheap, but carried along by the director's firm grasp on his potent themes. The new one works overtime to keep them intact, while communing with the first installment in every possible way — from that famously creepy synth score to the blocky orange credits that bookend the story". RogerEbert.com's Brian Tallerico gave Halloween two out of four stars, writing it "is admirable in its thematic relation to Carpenter's vision, but the no-nonsense, tightly-directed aspect of the influential classic just isn't a part of this one. Carpenter's movie is so tautly refined that the sometimes incompetent slackness of this one is all the more frustrating. As is the complete lack of atmosphere, another strength of the original". Forbes' Scott Mendelson thought the film is "not very good or tightly-directed, and it fails as a character play and a scary movie". Christopher Stewardson from Our Culture Mag wrote "Raising some interesting questions about indifference to escalating horror, Halloween draws Michael Myers in the modern world with consideration and calculated frights."

=== Accolades ===
The film was the runner-up for Grolsch People's Choice Midnight Madness Award at the Toronto International Film Festival in 2018. The film received four Fangoria Chainsaw Award nominations: Best Wide Release, Best Actor (James Jude Courtney / Nick Castle), Best Actress (Jamie Lee Curtis), and Best Makeup FX (Christopher Nelson). The film also received a nomination for Best Horror Film at the Saturn Awards, with Jamie Lee Curtis winning for Best Actress. Rhian Rees, who plays Dana Haines, was nominated for Most Frightened Performance at the 2019 MTV Movie & TV Awards.

== Legacy ==
=== Sequels ===
A sequel to this film was released in 2021, titled Halloween Kills. Its plot focuses on Strode and her family forming a group of attentive townspeople to fend off Myers. Halloween Ends was released on October 14, 2022.

=== Influence ===
Films such as Candyman (2021), Scream (2022), Texas Chainsaw Massacre (2022), The Exorcist: Believer (2023) and I Know What You Did Last Summer (2025) are frequently cited as taking inspiration of the film's approach to rebooting a horror franchise. These films are known as "requels", "legacy sequels" or "soft reboots".

== See also ==
- List of films set around Halloween
- List of horror films of 2018
