= Nick Castle =

American filmmaker (born 1947)

- Castle in 2025
- Born: Nicholas John Castle Jr. September 21, 1947 (age 79); Kingsport, Tennessee, U.S.
- Occupations: Film director; screenwriter; actor
- Years active: 1970–present

Nicholas John Castle Jr. (born September 21, 1947) is an American filmmaker and actor. He is known for playing Michael Myers in John Carpenter's horror film Halloween (1978). He also had a cameo as Myers in Halloween (2018), Halloween Kills (2021), and Halloween Ends (2022). Castle also co-wrote Escape from New York (1981) with Carpenter. After Halloween, Castle became a director, taking the helm of films such as The Last Starfighter (1984), The Boy Who Could Fly (1986), Dennis the Menace (1993), and Major Payne (1995).

== Career ==
Castle's film credits include Dark Star where he assisted with the production, and played the beach ball alien, Major Payne, Dennis the Menace, The Last Starfighter, and Connors' War as a director. He wrote the screenplays for the films Escape from New York and Hook. He was the writer and director of the film Tap.

Castle as Michael Myers in Halloween (1978)

In 1978, he played the iconic starring role of Michael Myers in the classic horror film Halloween, directed by former USC classmate John Carpenter, and was paid 25 dollars a day. Castle's subsequent collaborations with Carpenter included his name being used as one of the main characters' names in The Fog, co-writing the script of Escape from New York, and performing the 1986 title song of Big Trouble in Little China as part of the band The Coup De Villes, alongside Carpenter and another friend, writer/director Tommy Lee Wallace.

After Halloween, Castle had his directorial debut in Tag: The Assassination Game, followed by taking the helm of films such as The Last Starfighter, The Boy Who Could Fly, Dennis the Menace, and Major Payne. Castle wrote August Rush, a musical-drama directed by Kirsten Sheridan and starring Freddie Highmore, Jonathan Rhys-Meyers, Robin Williams, and Keri Russell, which was released in 2007. He also stars as himself in the 2010 documentary Halloween: The Inside Story by Filipino filmmaker Nick Noble.

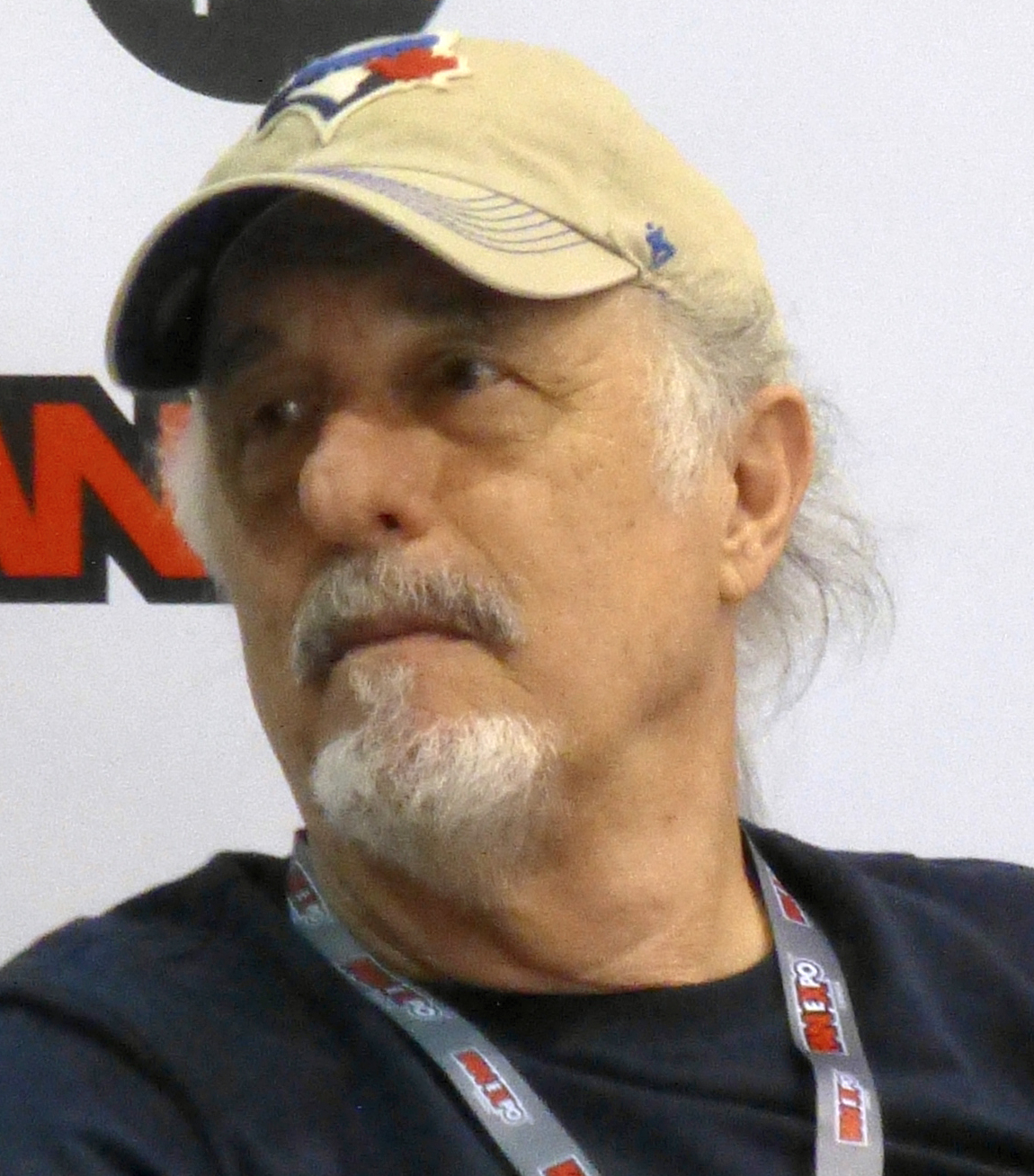
Castle in 2015

In 2018, Castle had a cameo as Michael Myers in the direct sequel, Halloween, directed by David Gordon Green, becoming the third actor to play Michael Myers more than once. The announcement of Nick Castle's participation was widely reported as his retaking the role of Michael Myers he originated, with stunt performer James Jude Courtney only doing additional work as the character. However, an interview with Courtney revealed that Castle's screentime was minimal and that the great majority of the work under the mask was done by Courtney himself, which led to the question of whether the return of Castle had been misrepresented by the production. While Courtney was involved in every scene featuring Myers, including those of Castle, who was only involved for a minimal amount of filming, which Castle described to the journalists on set as a cameo appearance, Castle reprises his role in one scene with Jamie Lee Curtis and did all of Michael Myers' breathing sounds in post-production. Courtney referred to collaborating with Castle as an "honor", while Castle described it as a "passing of the torch". Castle won a Saturn Award for Best Writing for The Boy Who Could Fly, a Silver Raven (for Delivering Milo), a Grand Prize (for The Last Starfighter), a Bronze Gryphon, and a Gold Medal of the Regional Council.

== Filmography ==
=== Film ===
Year	Film	Director	Writer	Notes
1970	The Resurrection of Broncho Billy	No	Story	Also cinematographer, short
1979	Skatetown, U.S.A.	No	Yes	
1980	Pray TV	No	Yes	
1981	Escape from New York	No	Yes	
1982	Tag: The Assassination Game	Yes	Yes	Directorial debut
1984	The Last Starfighter	Yes	No	
1986	The Boy Who Could Fly	Yes	Yes	
1989	Tap	Yes	Yes	
1991	Hook	No	Story	Replaced as director by Steven Spielberg
1993	Dennis the Menace	Yes	No	
1995	Major Payne	Yes	No	
1996	Mr. Wrong	Yes	No	
2001	Delivering Milo	Yes	No	
2001	'Twas the Night	Yes	No	
2004	The Seat Filler	Yes	No	
2006	Connors' War	Yes	No	Direct-to-video
2007	August Rush	No	Yes	

Acting roles
Year	Film	Role	Notes
1974	Dark Star	Beach Ball Alien	Also camera assistant
1978	Halloween	Michael Myers / The Shape	
1981	Escape from New York	Pianist	
1981	Halloween II	Michael Myers / The Shape	Archive breathing sounds
1986	The Boy Who Could Fly	The Coupe De Villes	
2018	Halloween	Michael Myers / The Shape	Cameo and breathing sounds
2019	In Search of Darkness	Himself	Documentary film
2020	In Search of Darkness: Part II	Himself	Documentary film
2021	Halloween Kills	Michael Myers / The Shape	
2022	Halloween Ends	Michael Myers / Party Dude	Cameo and breathing sounds for Michael Myers / The Shape

=== Television ===
Year	Title	Director	Writer	Notes
1987	Amazing Stories	Yes	No	Episode: "The 21-Inch Sun"
1988	Mama's Family	No	Concept	Episode: "Mama's Girls"
1990	Shangri-La Plaza	Yes	Yes	Also executive producer & composer, TV Pilot

=== Video games ===
Year	Film	Role	Notes
2026	Halloween: The Game	Michael Myers, Windy City Wayne	Motion capture Voice

Records
Preceded by John Dugan as Grandpa Sawyer	Playing the same role over the longest time 39 years 10 months 2018 – 2019; With: Jamie Lee Curtis	Succeeded by Harrison Ford; Mark Hamill
Preceded by John Dugan as Grandpa Sawyer	Reprising a role after the longest time 39 years 10 months 2018 – 2022	Succeeded by Jenny Agutter as Roberta Blureberry
Preceded by Harrison Ford; Mark Hamill	Playing the same role over the longest time 42 years 11 months 2021 – 2022; With: Jamie Lee Curtis	Succeeded by Jenny Agutter as Roberta Blureberry
Preceded by Jenny Agutter as Roberta Blureberry	Playing the same role over the longest time 47 years 10 months 2026 – present	Incumbent
