= Halloween Ends =

2022 film by David Gordon Green

- Theatrical release poster
- Directed by: David Gordon Green
- Written by: Paul Brad Logan; Chris Bernier; Danny McBride; David Gordon Green
- Based on: Characters by: John Carpenter; Debra Hill
- Produced by: Malek Akkad; Jason Blum; Bill Block
- Starring: Jamie Lee Curtis; Andi Matichak; James Jude Courtney; Will Patton; Rohan Campbell; Kyle Richards
- Cinematography: Michael Simmonds
- Edited by: Tim Alverson
- Music by: John Carpenter; Cody Carpenter; Daniel Davies
- Production companies: Miramax; Blumhouse Productions; Trancas International Films; Rough House Pictures
- Distributed by: Universal Pictures
- Release dates: October 11, 2022 (Beyond Fest); October 14, 2022 (United States)
- Running time: 111 minutes
- Country: United States
- Language: English
- Budget: $30–33 million
- Box office: $105.4 million

Halloween Ends is a 2022 American slasher film directed by David Gordon Green, and co-written by Green, Danny McBride, Paul Brad Logan, and Chris Bernier. It is the sequel to Halloween Kills (2021), the thirteenth installment in the Halloween franchise, and the final film in the trilogy of sequels that started with the 2018 film, which directly follows the 1978 film. The film stars Jamie Lee Curtis, Andi Matichak, Rohan Campbell, Will Patton, Kyle Richards, and James Jude Courtney. The plot follows the outcast Corey Cunningham who falls in love with Laurie Strode's granddaughter while a series of events, including crossing paths with Michael Myers, drives him to become a serial killer.

Before the release of Halloween in 2018, McBride confirmed that he and Green had intended to pitch two films that would be shot back-to-back, but decided against it, waiting to see the reaction to the first film. Following the success of the first film, in July 2019 the film's title was announced along with Halloween Kills. Green intended to give each film in the trilogy its own unique theme, Halloween Ends being a "love story"; John Carpenter described the film as a "departure" from its predecessors in the trilogy. After being delayed due to the ongoing COVID-19 pandemic, principal photography took place in Georgia between January and March 2022, with re-shoots taking place in mid-2022.

Halloween Ends premiered at Beyond Fest in Los Angeles on October 11, 2022, and was theatrically released in the United States on October 14, 2022, by Universal Pictures. It received mixed reviews from critics, who criticized its plot, writing, and focus on the new character Corey; although its performances (particularly Curtis and Campbell) received praise, many deemed it a disappointing conclusion to the trilogy. The film grossed $105 million against a $33 million production budget, making it the lowest-grossing of the trilogy of films by Green but the third highest-grossing film in the franchise.

== Plot ==
On Halloween night in 2019, 21-year-old Corey Cunningham babysits a young boy named Jeremy Allen who pulls a prank on him by locking him inside the attic. Just as Jeremy's parents come home, Corey kicks the door open and accidentally knocks Jeremy over a staircase railing to his death. Corey is arrested for aggravated manslaughter, but is cleared by the judge. Nonetheless, Corey is made an outcast by the citizens of Haddonfield, Illinois.

Three years later, Haddonfield is still reeling from the aftermath of Michael Myers's latest killing spree in 2018, (Note: As depicted in both Halloween (2018) and Halloween Kills (2021)) while Michael has vanished. Laurie Strode is writing a memoir and living with her granddaughter Allyson. Meanwhile, Corey is working at his stepfather's salvage yard. On his way home one day, he is accosted by high school bullies and injures himself in the process. Laurie, having witnessed the incident, brings Corey to the doctor's office where Allyson is working herself. Allyson and Corey agree to a date at a Halloween party, where Corey is confronted by Mrs. Allen when she recognizes him. Corey leaves the party and runs into the bullies who throw him off a bridge. Unconscious, he is dragged into the sewers where Michael resides and is choked by him, but Michael eventually lets him go. As he crawls out, Corey is threatened by a homeless man. In a struggle, Corey stabs the man to death and flees.

During a dinner date, Corey and Allyson are harassed by her ex-boyfriend, an officer who previously arrested Corey for Jeremy's death. Corey later retaliates by luring him into the sewer to be killed by Michael. Soon after, Allyson is passed over for a promotion at work, in favor of a nurse who is having an affair with the doctor. When Corey finds out about this, he kills the doctor at his home while Michael kills the nurse. Allyson, unaware of Corey's murders, plans to leave Haddonfield with an insistent Corey to escape their trauma. Speaking with Jeremy's father, Laurie realizes Corey is "infected" by Michael's evil, but her wariness fractures her and Allyson's relationship.

On Halloween day, Corey, after sleeping in the spot where Jeremy died, finds himself confronted by Laurie, who offers help on the condition he ends things with Allyson, only for Corey to rebuke her and state that if he cannot have Allyson, no one will. Corey returns to the sewers where he overpowers Michael for his mask. Corey embarks on a rampage, murdering the bullies after luring them to the salvage yard, one of whom accidentally kills Corey's stepfather. Corey goes on to kill his mother, and a DJ at a local radio station who had taunted him earlier.

Eventually, Corey is lured to the Strode house when Laurie fakes a suicide attempt to ambush him. When Laurie shoots him down the stairs, Corey stabs himself in the neck to frame Laurie for his death in front of the arriving Allyson, who leaves in distress. Moments later, Michael arrives to retrieve his mask, killing Corey by breaking his neck. Michael then searches for Laurie in her house, and the two engage in a violent fight, ending with Laurie pinning Michael to the table. Laurie unmasks Michael, declaring he's not the boogeyman, but merely a man, before slitting his throat. Michael yanks his injured hand free and begins to choke Laurie. However, Allyson — having learned the truth about Corey's murders and death after receiving a call from Deputy Frank Hawkins — returns in time to break Michael's arm. After Laurie slices Michael's wrists, Michael bleeds out and finally dies. Laurie and Allyson take Michael's body to the salvage yard by police escort attracting the residents of Haddonfield, who follow them in a procession. They watch as Laurie disposes of Michael's body in an industrial shredder, signaling the end of Michael's reign of terror.

In the aftermath, Allyson and Laurie reconcile from the preceding days and Allyson eventually leaves Haddonfield while Laurie finishes her memoir and rediscovers her romance with Hawkins. The last shot of the film shows that Laurie kept Michael's mask, ending with a slow zooming in on the mask.

== Cast ==
- Jamie Lee Curtis as Laurie Strode, a survivor of Michael Myers' 1978 killing spree and Allyson's grandmother.
- Andi Matichak as Allyson Nelson, Laurie's granddaughter and the survivor of Michael's killing spree in 2018.
- Rohan Campbell as Corey Cunningham, a young man who accidentally killed a child while he babysat. Though he was cleared of the charge, he was made an outcast and had an encounter with Michael Myers which leads to him becoming a serial killer.
- Will Patton as Deputy Frank Hawkins, a sheriff's deputy who arrested Michael following his initial killing spree in 1978.
- Kyle Richards as Lindsey Wallace, one of the children Annie, Laurie's deceased best friend, babysat in 1978 who survived an encounter with Michael in 2018.
- James Jude Courtney as Michael Myers / The Shape, the masked figure who carried out a horrific massacre on Halloween night in 1978, and returned to Haddonfield for another killing spree forty years later in 2018.
  - Nick Castle, who portrayed the character in the original 1978 film, provides voiceover work for Myers' breathing and makes an unrelated cameo appearance in a party scene.

Also appearing in the film are Jesse C. Boyd as Officer Doug Mulaney, Allyson's ex-boyfriend who previously arrested Corey; Joanne Baron as Joan Cunningham, Corey's overbearing mother; Rick Moose as Ronald Prevo, Corey's stepfather who owns the salvage yard that Corey worked at; Michael Barbieri as Terry Tramer, the leader of the gang of bullies who target Corey; Destiny Mone as Stacy, Joey Harris as Margo, and Marteen as Billy, members of Terry's gang; Michael O'Leary as Dr. Mathis, Allyson's boss at the local hospital; Michele Dawson as Deb, Allyson's coworker who is having an affair with Dr. Mathis; Keraun Harris as Willy the Kid, a local radio DJ who taunts Corey; Jaxon Goldberg as Jeremy Allen, a young boy who dies in a prank gone wrong while Corey is babysitting him; Candice Rose and Jack William Marshall as Theresa and Roger Allen, Jeremy's parents; Tony DeMil as Robert Tramer, Ben Tramer's son and Terry's abusive father; and Omar Dorsey as Sheriff Barker, Haddonfield's current sheriff.

== Production ==
=== Development ===
"I knew I wanted to be very romantic, and I knew I wanted to put my heart on my sleeve and make a movie about bad boys and motorcycles and leather jackets and that kind of thing."

— David Gordon Green

In June 2018, Danny McBride confirmed that he and David Gordon Green had originally intended to pitch two Halloween films that would be shot back-to-back, and then decided against it, waiting to see the reaction to their first Halloween film (2018). In September, producer Jason Blum said that "we will do a sequel if the movie performs". A month later, after the new film Halloween's opening weekend, McBride confirmed that early development on a sequel had begun. Green, McBride and Jeff Fradley had planned out a two-film story arc, but opted for a trilogy after realizing they had more material than originally thought. As soon as Halloween was released in theaters, McBride and Green started devising the story for two sequels alongside other writers such as Scott Teems, Chris Bernier and Paul Brad Logan for each individual sequel, with both sequels being written simultaneously by different writing teams, with Green and McBride mainly writing them and then bringing other writers to "curate" their "crazy" brains and give focus to the story. In July 2019, Bloody Disgusting reported that a third film was also in development, with Green returning as director. The site also claimed that the studio was considering releasing both films in October 2020. The film was originally titled Halloween Dies around this time very early in development, before Universal opted to retitle the film Halloween Ends.

In July 2019, Universal Pictures revealed the titles and release dates of the two sequels, with Halloween Kills (2021) and the now-retitled Halloween Ends set to be released in 2020 and 2021, respectively. Green was officially announced to direct both films and co-write the scripts with McBride, Teems was confirmed as a co-writer for Halloween Kills, while Logan and Bernier were announced as co-writers of Halloween Ends. Blum, Malek Akkad and Bill Block were slated to produce the film while John Carpenter, Curtis, Green and McBride were attached as executive producers once again. The writing team, consisting of Green, McBride, Bernier and Logan, started workshopping ideas before production of Halloween Kills commenced, completing a first draft in 2019. The final script was completed in 2021 pending Carpenter's approval. Due to the COVID-19 pandemic, Universal delayed the release dates of both Kills and Ends by a year.

=== Writing ===
Green set out to make each sequel different. For the second film, he wanted an action film and for the finale a love story. Green intended to further explore what can make a person turn into a psychopath through Corey Cunningham's character; Green conceived Corey in order to explore and get a perspective of how Michael Myers and Laurie Strode affected the town of Haddonfield, with Corey devised as someone traumatized like Strode that encounters an evil stalker like Myers that ends up "infecting" him into turning evil and let spread his unchecked negative inner entities instead of "wrapping them around their heads, be their own heroes and thus get a chance to fight them". Benefitting from a character arc closely similar to that of Keith Gordon's Arnie Cunningham from Carpenter's Christine (1983), Corey was overall created to mimic how neglected community members can unexpectedly turn to evil. The role was also inspired by real-life perpetrators of school shootings; Corey's inclusion allowed Green to orchestrate very different "kills" to those Myers committed in the previous two films, as Corey wants to emulate Myers' violent acts but is somewhat "messy" with his kills, not killing people "well" like Myers does. McBride liked Green's idea of focusing on Corey and considered his pitch a "smart take" because it would enable them to avoid a repetitive plot and explore something different as long as they tied that to the core themes of the Halloween franchise. Carpenter gave Green and McBride his approval for Corey when he was informed he would be one of the film's protagonists, congratulating them for not rehashing the same plotline in every film, which Carpenter himself struggled to do when writing Halloween II (1981).

In October 2021, Green revealed that Halloween Ends would take place four years after the events of Halloween Kills and would incorporate elements of the pandemic into the story. In an interview, Logan extinguished Internet rumors that the film was supposed to take place on the same night of the previous installments. Curtis claimed the film would be "shocking" and would "make people very angry". Akkad stated Ends would be more "contained" than Kills, while Green called it an intimate coming-of-age story, much like Carpenter's Christine. Other cited influences on the film were Willard (1971), Butcher, Baker, Nightmare Maker (1981), My Bodyguard (1980), Blood Rage, Bad Taste (both 1987) and Fallen Angels (1995); the latter two specifically inspiring the motorcycle bonding scene between Allyson Nelson and Corey Cunningham with Wong Kar-wai's "coolness" and the celebratory My Bodyguard moment. Most of the films were generally movies Green wasn't allowed to see as a child back in the 1980s, hence why he went to a friend's house to watch them in a VHS format.

Several different endings were considered for the film; Green ultimately chose a more "satisfactory, optimistic, hopeful" conclusion after Kills's "bleak" ending, compensating for the traumatic events that Laurie Strode lived through in the film and its predecessors. The original ending of the film, revealed by Curtis in Horror's New Wave: 15 Years of Blumhouse in October 2025 and previous alluded to by Green in a 2023 interview, had Laurie and Michael's final battle in a mask factory which produced Michael's iconic mask, similar to the Silver Shamrock masks from Halloween III: Season of the Witch (1982), and underlying that "[we're] all monsters if we put on [Michael's] mask"; this was later scrapped for being too meta. Another planned, darker ending had Laurie Strode committing suicide at the end of the film, but according to Green, the "moment in which Laurie put a gun to her mouth" was the one where he, Brad Logan, Bernier and McBride had to make the decision and starting coming up with different Choose Your Own Adventure-type alternatives. Another darker ending the writers considered had Corey Cunningham not only surviving the film's events and getting away with his murders, but also convincing Allyson to join him and the two running off to "hit the road" in a Natural Born Killers (1994)-style ending. Other versions had Corey realizing the error of his ways and "stepping back" after having had a taste of committing murder or Corey becoming Michael Myers' successor in case the filmmakers wished to keep making more Halloween films after Green's departure from the series. Another ending that was partially shot before being scrapped involved Laurie inheriting the evil of Michael after killing him, leading her to isolate herself from everyone, regressing her character to the state she was initially in Halloween. Curtis felt this was "too dark", and the procession ending and Laurie moving on with Frank was conceived afterwards. From all the endings they tested and scenes they removed for the film's finale, McBride felt that the one ultimately used was the most anticipated.

=== Casting ===
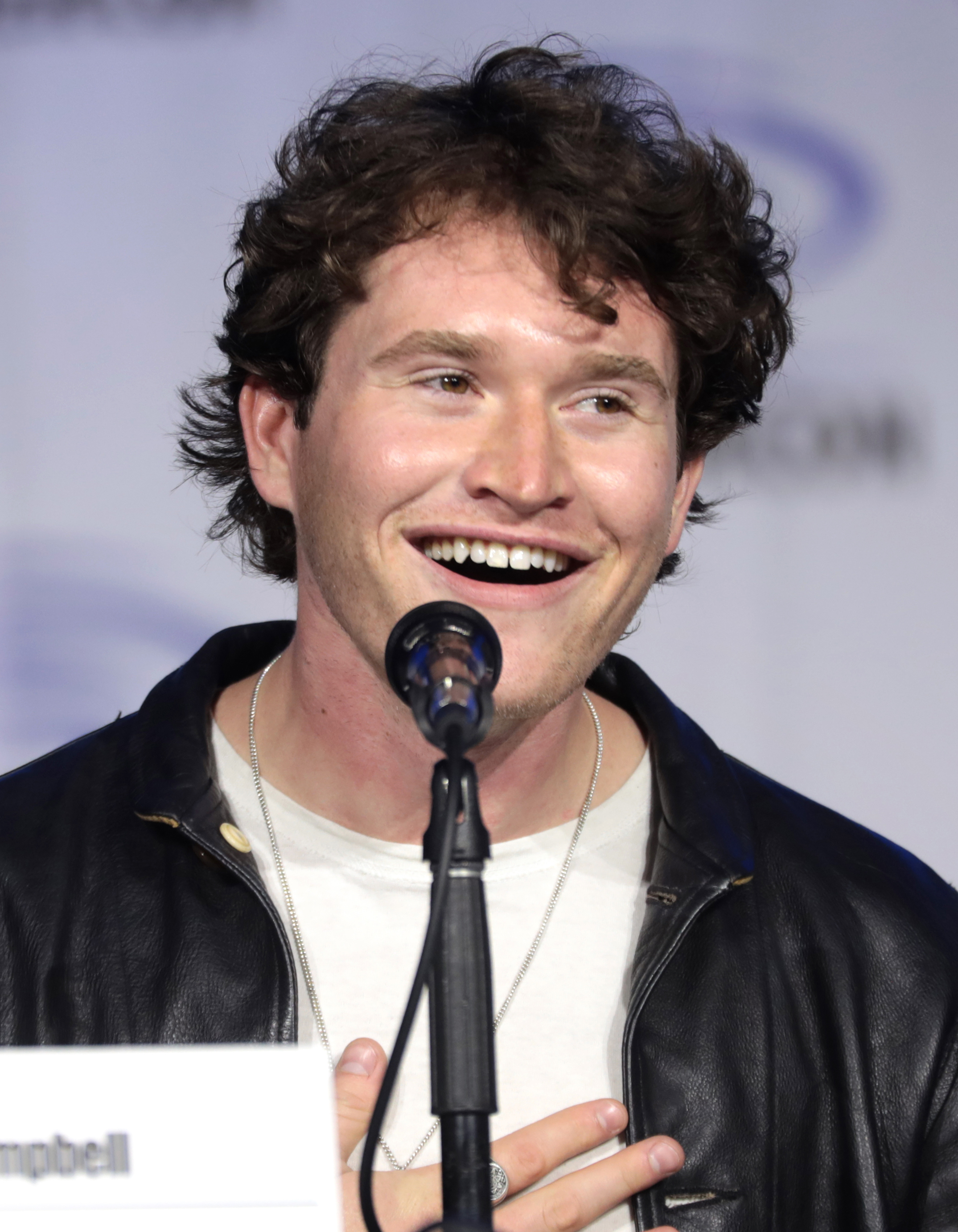
Rohan Campbell was initially unaware of his character's significance to the story.

In July 2019, along with the announcements of two sequels to 2018's Halloween, it was announced that Jamie Lee Curtis would reprise her role as Laurie Strode in both Halloween Kills and Halloween Ends. Curtis was paid $3.5 million for her involvement. Judy Greer and Andi Matichak were confirmed to reprise their roles as Karen and Allyson Nelson that same month, though, Greer was not included in Ends as her character Karen was killed during the climax of Kills. In December 2021, it was revealed that Kyle Richards would be reprising her role for the film. Initially, the character was not expected to return for the film, but following the positive reception to Richards's performance, the script was rewritten to give her an expanded role. The following month, Michael O'Leary joined the cast.

Upon being cast around 2018 or 2019, aside from being unaware he had been auditioning for a Halloween film, Rohan Campbell was initially unaware of his character's significance to the story, expecting him to die early on due to his role as a babysitter in the film's opening. To help shape his performance, Campbell was asked by Green to watch horror films about outcasts. Upon meeting with Campbell, Green "fell in love" with what they could do to Corey and it partly led him to change the original ending he envisioned for the character to not leave his fate open-ended. Campbell was one of the hundreds of actors who auditioned for Corey Cunningham, but Green and his assistant director chose him due to having a neutral "tough but sensitive" face, a neutral "handsomeness" and a look of having "life and emotion" plus his physicality, which later led Green to convince himself that Campbell could accurately portray Corey as a motorcycle rider instead of just acting like he knew due to his experiences, partially embodying the 1980s leather jacket bad boy. Green worked to keep the actor out of the press leading up to the film's release. According to Campbell, both Green and Curtis warned him about potential backlash regarding the introduction of his character.

A casting call took place in late January and February 2022 in numerous Southeast Georgia towns. In an interview with Collider, Green hinted that co-writer Danny McBride had requested a cameo appearance in the film, potentially as a character who fights Myers. In June 2022, Nick Castle announced that he would make a cameo appearance unrelated to the role of Michael Myers. Following the release of the teaser trailer in July 2022, Omar Dorsey, Will Patton, and James Jude Courtney were revealed to reprise their roles from the previous films. Green cited Courtney's "extraordinary work" in the previous films as the reason for his decision to have him portray Michael Myers for the entirety of the film.

=== Filming ===
It was originally planned to film Halloween Kills and Halloween Ends back-to-back, but did not occur due to the "intense schedule". In March 2020, Blum confirmed filming would take place during the summer. Filming was quietly delayed due to the COVID-19 pandemic. Production was expected to take place in 2021 in Wilmington, North Carolina. In August 2021, Courtney confirmed that filming would begin on January 10, 2022. However, filming officially began on January 19, 2022, in Savannah, Georgia under the working title Cave Dweller. Michael Simmonds once again served as director of photography. Curtis began filming her scenes on January 25 and wrapped on February 22. Campbell insisted on filming himself the scene in which Corey kills one of his bullies instead of requiring a stuntman's assistance. Green allowed his actors to improvise to infuse humor within the film's tone. The last showdown between the franchise's main characters was assembled and reassembled throughout filming, having been written "spectacularly" since the film's first draft, forcing the stunt team to try new things occasionally and creating several continuity errors in the process due to returning with new additions to the filming set multiple times. Additional scenes were shot in Sylvania, Georgia. Filming concluded on March 9, 2022.

In June 2022, two weeks of re-shoots took place in Savannah. However, these re-shoots only lasted four days and were completed that same month. As with most of his films since his very first assembly, Green test screened Ends to see if it engaged audiences or not. After several test screenings, the original final confrontation between Laurie Strode and Michael Myers as well as the ending sequence were discarded, and re-shoots for new scenes took place, four months ahead of the film's premiere. The climatic procession sequence, when Michael Myers' corpse is paraded to all surviving Haddonfielders and disposed of inside an industrial shredder, was a late addition to the film that was shot around August 2022 after Green and his crew concluded that they wished for "something more grand" for the film's ending. It was decided that the film's conclusion should be more "modest" and "intimate" with some story points as opposed to a brawl like the "super noisy and aggressive" ending of Kills, with Green wishing to return the series to its "simple dramatic roots".

=== Post-production ===
In June 2022, Blum confirmed that the film had test screened internally the month prior and that it would be the last Halloween film from Blumhouse. The following month, Carpenter described the film as a "departure" from the previous entries in Green's trilogy. In August, Castle had finished ADR for Michael Myers. By the end of the month, Green stated that the film was still being tweaked despite the film being picture locked. According to cinematographer Michael Simmonds, a practical version of the opening titles sequence, showing jack-o'-lanterns emerging from within each other, was initially created by production designer Richard Wright, but later replaced by a digital version. The film's opening features blue titles in reference to Halloween III: Season of the Witch (1982), the original second sequel to the 1978 film.

=== Music ===
The score for Halloween Ends was composed by John Carpenter, his son Cody Carpenter, and Daniel Davies, who had previously collaborated on the first two films in the series. The official soundtrack was released digitally on October 14, 2022, by Sacred Bones Records, with a limited vinyl release set for January 20, 2023. In anticipation of the film's premiere, two tracks were released in September 2022, "The Junk Yard" and "The Procession". Recorded entirely at Carpenter and Davies's home studios, the score incorporates themes from the original 1978 film and features original music from electronic music group Boy Harsher.

== Release ==
Halloween Ends premiered at Grauman's Chinese Theater, Los Angeles, as part of Beyond Fest on October 11, 2022. The premiere coincided with actress Jamie Lee Curtis's induction ceremony at the Hollywood Walk of Fame in front of the theater the following day. The film was released theatrically in the United States by Universal Pictures on October 14, 2022, playing in 3,901 theaters for a total theatrical run of approximately 3.8 weeks. In addition, the film started streaming simultaneously on paid tiers of Peacock for 60 days. It was initially set to be theatrically released on October 15, 2021, but it was delayed due to the COVID-19 pandemic.

=== Home media ===
Halloween Ends was released digitally on November 15, 2022, and was released on Ultra HD Blu-ray, Blu-ray and DVD on December 27, 2022.

== Reception ==
=== Audience viewership ===
According to Samba TV, the film was viewed by 920,000 households in its first week of streaming on the platform, down from Halloween Kills's 1.7 million households. The film received enough views in the week of October 10–16, 2022, however, to rank number eight overall and the top film for that week's Nielsen streaming rankings, making it the first program on Peacock to rank in the weekly Nielsen top 10.

=== Box office ===
Halloween Ends grossed $64.1 million in the United States and Canada, and $41.3 million in other territories, for a worldwide total of $105.4 million. It was the lowest-grossing out of the trilogy of Halloween films directed by David Gordon Green, with approximately 6,085,457 tickets sold during its initial theatrical run compared to the 2018 film's 17,395,416 and Kills' 9,046,426.

In the United States and Canada, Halloween Ends was projected to gross $50–60 million from 3,901 theaters in its opening weekend. The film made $20.4 million on its first day, including $5.4 million from Thursday night previews, up 9% from Kills's $4.9 million the year prior. It went on to debut with $40.1 million (62.5% of total gross), topping the box office but finishing below projections, blamed in part on the film's simultaneous release to streaming platform Peacock; Universal reported it was the most watched film or series ever on the platform over a two-day period. The studio also reported that the film was most popular among audiences aged 18 to 34, with only 26% being 35 and older. The film dropped by 80% in its second weekend, finishing fourth with $8 million. The 88% drop from the film's first Friday to second was a "near-record" decrease and was credited to its day-and-date streaming release and poor reception by critics and audiences.

=== Critical response ===
On review aggregator website Rotten Tomatoes, the film holds an approval rating of 40% based on 266 reviews, with an average rating of 5.1/10. The site's critics consensus reads: "Halloween Ends -- for now, anyway -- with a frequently befuddling installment that's stabbed, slashed, and beaten by a series of frustrating missed opportunities." On Metacritic, the film has a weighted average score of 47 out of 100 based on 46 critics, indicating "mixed or average" reviews. Audiences polled by CinemaScore gave the film an average grade of "C+" on an A+ to F scale, the lowest of Green's trilogy and the lowest of the franchise since Halloween III: Season of the Witch, while those surveyed by PostTrak gave it a 64% overall positive score, with an average 2.5 out of five stars.

Richard Roeper of the Chicago Sun-Times gave the film 1.5 out of 4 stars, writing that the "so-called finale of the Michael Myers saga is just stabbing, metaphors, stabbing, soap opera, stabbing, marching band bullies, stabbing and more stabbing". Writing for Variety, Owen Gleiberman said the film is "neither scary nor fun" and called it "the most joylessly metaphorical and convoluted entry" of the franchise to date. Ben Travis of Empire gave a negative review, calling the film "lost up in its own abyss" and "an unsatisfying closing chapter" and criticizing Green's direction as "[struggling] to synthesise the serious stuff with the demands of a popcorn shocker".

Multiple critics praised the opening sequence, with USA Today's Brian Truitt calling it "an unnerving, unexpected scene that revels in a sense of parental dread right from the get-go", and The Hollywood Reporter's David Rooney describing it as "an intriguing detour". Writing for Texas Monthly, Sean O'Neal said Halloween Ends is the most unique film out of Green's trilogy because it is the one that most resembles his independent films. O'Neal wrote, "Strange as it may sound, Halloween Ends contains echoes of Green’s name-making debut George Washington, another small-town tragedy that similarly spun out from the accidental death of a child. And its meditations on the inescapability of violence and the sins of abusive fathers give it a spiritual connection to Joe. The way Corey's bad reputation clouds his romance with Allyson, set up by a match-making Laurie, even recalls All the Real Girls in the film’s slow-burning opening stretch, during which Green seems content just to linger in his prairie gothic tale of grief and sublimated rage".

K. Austin Collins of Rolling Stone gave a positive review in which he similarly deemed Halloween Ends the best out of Green's Halloween trilogy, noting its "interestingly complex tangle of emotions and fears" and comparing it to Green's previous "capably observed" independent films. The New York Times reviewed the film as being "a movie that's less frantic and more intimate than its predecessor, one that unfolds with a mourning finality". Time Out also reviewed the film more positively than they did Kills, giving it a 3-star review and calling it a "pleasant surprise". While also considering it an improvement over its predecessor, Todd Gilchrist of The A.V. Club criticized the lack of focus on the series' main antagonist and ultimately labeled it "not particularly good" and an "unsatisfying close". Kyle Smith of The Wall Street Journal found Curtis's performance "a pleasure to watch" and called the film "largely gripping". Toronto Star's Peter Howell gave the film 2.5 out of 4 stars, describing it as "clever" and "likely to go down well with fans of the franchise" but noted that true finality is likely impossible for this series.

In his review for The Hollywood Reporter, David Rooney called it "a sloppy movie whose principal new inspiration feels bogus", although "horror fans might enjoy homages to other films from the Carpenter canon". Giving 1.5 out of 4 stars, Brian Tallerico of RogerEbert.com found the film to be "poorly executed", rushed, and "barely a 'Halloween' movie" due to the story's focus on newly introduced characters, and considered Rohan Campbell's performance especially lacking. He concluded, "What's more likely true is that Green and his team had a truly ambitious film idea about the nature of evil and how violent loners can be created by fearful societies ... but they also had to make a 'Halloween' movie. It's the two concepts pushing and pulling against each other that tear this movie apart."

Despite the mixed reception, the film ranked #2 on The Hollywood Reporter's list of "The Best Slasher Movies of the Decade".

=== Accolades ===
Accolades received by Halloween Ends
Date	Award	Category	Recipient(s)	Result	Ref.
2022	Hollywood Music in Media Awards	Original Score — Horror Film	John Carpenter, Cody Carpenter and Daniel Davies	Nominated	
2022	People's Choice Awards	The Drama Movie of 2022	Halloween Ends	Nominated	
2022	People's Choice Awards	The Drama Movie Star of 2022	Jamie Lee Curtis	Nominated	

== Future ==
John Carpenter explained that possible future installments were dependent on the commercial success of Ends, although he acknowledged that Green was adamant in Ends being their story's ending. In an interview with The New York Times, Jamie Lee Curtis commented that the four films, commencing with the 1978 Halloween and concluding with Halloween Ends, were self-contained, although there was still the possibility of a new narrative being adapted into future films. Green stated that he was confident on parting with Jamie Lee Curtis's Laurie Strode with the film, though he acknowledged the possibility of eventually some filmmakers creating a "new Laurie" with some plot twist to continue the franchise's mythology. Curtis had previously confirmed in an essay for People that Halloween Ends marked her last appearance in the franchise; Jude Courtney likewise affirmed to Screen Rant that, alongside Curtis, he feels "done" with the franchise due to both his age and career trajectory, having felt Halloween and Kills as playoffs and Ends as a Super Bowl win so he decided to retire as the character triumphantly. Jason Blum reiterated that, while it would not necessarily be the final film in the franchise, it will be the last Halloween movie under Blumhouse Productions, with the intellectual property rights reverting to producer Malek Akkad following the release of Ends. In October 2025, Blum confirmed that Blumhouse effectively no longer owned the rights to make any more Halloween films, though he personally would love to make another film in the franchise.

== See also ==
- List of films set around Halloween
- List of horror films of 2022
