= Halloween Kills =

2021 film by David Gordon Green

- Theatrical Release poster
- Directed by: David Gordon Green
- Written by: Scott Teems; Danny McBride; David Gordon Green
- Based on: Characters by: John Carpenter; Debra Hill
- Produced by: Malek Akkad; Jason Blum; Bill Block
- Starring: Jamie Lee Curtis; Judy Greer; Andi Matichak; Will Patton; Thomas Mann; Anthony Michael Hall
- Cinematography: Michael Simmonds
- Edited by: Tim Alverson
- Music by: John Carpenter; Cody Carpenter; Daniel Davies
- Production companies: Miramax; Blumhouse Productions; Trancas International Films; Rough House Pictures
- Distributed by: Universal Pictures
- Release dates: September 8, 2021 (Venice); October 15, 2021 (United States)
- Running time: 105 minutes
- Country: United States
- Language: English
- Budget: $20 million
- Box office: $133.4 million

Halloween Kills is a 2021 American slasher film directed by David Gordon Green, and co-written by Green, Danny McBride, and Scott Teems. It is the sequel to Halloween (2018) and the twelfth installment in the Halloween franchise. The film stars Jamie Lee Curtis, Judy Greer, Andi Matichak, Will Patton, Thomas Mann, Jim Cummings, and Anthony Michael Hall. The film begins on the same night where the previous film ended with James Jude Courtney reprising his role as Michael Myers whose presence has become apparent to the residents of Haddonfield.

Jason Blum served as a producer on the film through his Blumhouse Productions banner, alongside Malek Akkad and Bill Block. Executive producers include Jamie Lee Curtis and John Carpenter with Carpenter also returning to compose the score with his son Cody Carpenter and Daniel Davies. Before the release of the film, McBride confirmed that he and Green were originally intending to pitch two films that would be shot back-to-back and then decided against it, waiting to see the reaction to the first film. Following the critical and commercial success of the 2018 film, development on the sequel promptly began as early as October 2018. By February 2019, Teems was hired to co-write the script. The film's title was officially announced in July 2019, along with its sequel. Principal photography began in September 2019 in Wilmington, North Carolina, and concluded in November in the same year.

Following a year delay due to the COVID-19 pandemic, Halloween Kills had its world premiere at the 78th Venice International Film Festival on September 8, 2021, and was theatrically released in the United States on October 15, 2021, by Universal Pictures. The film received mixed reviews from critics, who praised the film's effects, score, cinematography, and the performances of the cast (particularly Curtis, Greer, and Matichak), but criticized its screenplay, direction, and plot. The film was a box office success, grossing over $133 million worldwide. A sequel, Halloween Ends, was released on October 14, 2022.

== Plot ==
On Halloween night in 1978, (Note: As depicted in Halloween (1978)) rookie police officer Hawkins accidentally shoots his partner dead while trying to save him from Michael Myers. Hawkins also prevents Dr. Samuel Loomis from executing Michael, who had surrendered to police outside his home.

Forty years later, after being stabbed and left to die by Dr. Ranbir Sartain, (Note: As depicted in Halloween (2018)) Frank Hawkins is found by Cameron Elam, who calls an ambulance. Hawkins regrets allowing Michael to live, and vows to kill him. At a local bar, Tommy Doyle commemorates the 40th anniversary of Michael's capture, along with fellow survivors, Marion Chambers, Lindsey Wallace, and Cameron's father, Lonnie Elam, having each survived an encounter with Michael in 1978. Meanwhile, Laurie Strode, her daughter, Karen, and her granddaughter, Allyson, are taken to Haddonfield Memorial Hospital, where Laurie undergoes emergency surgery. Firefighters responding to Laurie's burning house encounter Michael, who slaughters them with their own equipment. Michael attacks and kills Laurie's neighbor, Phil, and critically injures his wife, Sondra, before walking back to Haddonfield.

Tommy, Marion, Lindsey, and Lonnie learn of Michael's killing spree through an emergency alert. Tommy forms a mob of vengeful Haddonfield residents to hunt down and kill Michael. Karen is informed that Michael is still alive and withholds that information from Laurie to allow her to recover, while Allyson reconciles with Cameron, her ex-boyfriend and joins Tommy's mob to avenge her own father's death.

While warning the Haddonfield community to stay inside their houses, Marion, and bar patrons, Vanessa and Marcus, are killed by Michael. Lindsey escapes and is found alive by Tommy, Lonnie, Allyson, and Cameron. The group map out Michael's path and his victims' location and deduce that he is heading towards his childhood home. Tommy takes Lindsey to the hospital and reunites with former Haddonfield sheriff, Leigh Brackett, whose daughter, Annie, was killed in 1978, and informs Laurie about Michael's survival. Across town, Michael murders the current owners of his former home, Big John and Little John, as Laurie prepares to leave the hospital.

Lance Tivoli, a fugitive convict from Smith's Grove Psychiatric Hospital, who escaped alongside Michael when their bus crashed, arrives and is mistaken for Michael. Tommy's mob pursue him through the hospital before Karen realizes that he is not Michael. Despite her attempts to calm the mob and help Lance, he jumps out of a window to his death. Laurie urges Karen to work with Tommy and Brackett to hunt Michael down. Elsewhere, Lonnie enters Michael's home alone, and is killed. Allyson and Cameron rush inside and find his corpse before being attacked by Michael, who murders Cameron.

As Michael prepares to kill Allyson, Karen appears and stabs him in the back with a pitchfork, steals his mask, and taunts him to follow her. She leads Michael into Tommy's mob, who seemingly kill him. When the mob drops their guard, believing Michael is dead, he awakens and massacres the entire mob, including Tommy and Brackett. Back at the Myers house, Karen sees a vision of a young Michael in Judith Myers's old bedroom and goes upstairs to investigate. Michael appears and stabs Karen to death as Laurie stares out of her hospital room.

== Cast ==
- Jamie Lee Curtis as Laurie Strode, a survivor of Michael Myers' 1978 killing spree, suffering from post-traumatic stress disorder. She is Karen's mother and Allyson's grandmother.
- Judy Greer as Karen Nelson, Laurie's daughter and Allyson's mother
- Andi Matichak as Allyson Nelson, Karen's daughter and Laurie's granddaughter
- Will Patton as Frank Hawkins, a sheriff's deputy stabbed and run over in the previous film who arrested Michael following his initial killing spree in 1978
  - Thomas Mann portrays a younger version of Frank Hawkins.
- Anthony Michael Hall as Tommy Doyle, Lindsey's friend and one of the children Laurie babysat in 1978. He was previously portrayed by Brian Andrews in the 1978 original and by Paul Rudd in the alternate continuity sequel Halloween: The Curse of Michael Myers.
- Robert Longstreet as Lonnie Elam, Cameron's father who bullied Tommy Doyle as a child in 1978 but now is his best friend. He was previously portrayed by Brent Le Page in the 1978 original film.
  - Tristian Eggerling as Lonnie Elam in 1978 flashbacks.
- Dylan Arnold as Cameron Elam, Allyson's ex-boyfriend and Lonnie's son
- James Jude Courtney and Nick Castle as Michael Myers / The Shape, a masked figure who carried out a massacre on Halloween in 1978 before returning to Haddonfield in 2018 for another killing spree
  - Airon Armstrong portrays a younger version of Michael Myers in the 1978 Halloween night flashbacks.
  - Christian Michael Pates portrays Michael Myers as a 6-year-old child, as seen in Karen's imagination. He was previously played by Will Sandin in the 1978 original film.
- Charles Cyphers as Leigh Brackett, Haddonfield's former sheriff who lost his daughter in the 1978 killing spree and pursued Michael alongside Samuel Loomis. Cyphers reprises his role from the 1978 original and the now-ignored 1981 sequel Halloween II, though archive footage from the latter when Brackett sees his daughter's corpse is still used in this film. This was Cyphers’ last film role before his death in 2024.
- Nancy Stephens as Marion Chambers, the retired former assistant to Dr. Samuel Loomis. Stephens reprises her role from the 1978 original film and the now-ignored sequels Halloween II (1981) and Halloween H20: 20 Years Later (1998).
- Kyle Richards as Lindsey Wallace, Tommy's friend and one of the children Annie, Laurie's deceased bestfriend babysat in 1978. Richards reprises her role from the 1978 original film.
- The Levesque Triplets as the singing triplets in the bar.
- Carmela McNeal as Vanessa, the "nurse".
- Michael Smallwood as Marcus, the "doctor" and Vanessa's husband.
- Mike Dupree as the singing ventriloquist.

Also appearing in the film are Omar Dorsey as Barker, Haddonfield's current sheriff; Jim Cummings as Pete McCabe, Hawkins' partner whom Hawkins accidentally killed in 1978; Scott MacArthur and Michael McDonald as Big John and Little John, the current owners of Myers' house; Ross Bacon as Lance Tivoli, an escaped convict from Smith's Grove Psychiatric Hospital who is mistaken with Michael; Brian F. Durkin as Graham, Haddonfield's deputy sheriff; Lenny Clarke and Diva Tyler as Phil and Sondra Dickerson (Diva was the caretaker in the previous film), Laurie's neighbors; and Elaine Nalee as a helpful neighbor from Tommy's mob.

Other actors also reprising their roles from the 2018 film include Drew Scheid as Oscar, Cameron's best friend who was killed by Michael, seen as a corpse and heard via a voicemail message; Jibrail Nantambu as Julian Morrisey, a young boy who escaped from Michael's killing spree, seen only in a brief TV news interview; and Haluk Bilginer as Dr. Ranbir Sartain, Michael's psychiatrist, seen in archive footage. Dr. Samuel Loomis is portrayed by the film's construction foreman, Tom Jones Jr., and is voiced by Colin Mahan, reprising his vocal role as Loomis from the 2018 film. Prosthetic makeup was used to make Jones facially resemble Donald Pleasence. P. J. Soles and Nancy Kyes appear as Lynda Van Der Klok and Annie Brackett, respectively, in archive footage from the 1978 film. Kyes is also shown in repurposed archive footage from the now non-canon Halloween II (1981), in which Brackett sees Annie's dead body. Bob Odenkirk has a cameo appearance in a photograph as Bob Simms, one of Myers' victims from the 1978 film. The producers were unable to secure the likeness of original actor John Michael Graham for the film and instead used a real high school yearbook photograph of Odenkirk after discovering their resemblance.

== Production ==
=== Development ===
In June 2018, Danny McBride confirmed that he and David Gordon Green had originally intended to pitch two films that would be shot back-to-back and then decided against it, waiting to see the reaction to the first film:

"We were going to shoot two of them back-to-back. Then we were like, 'Well, let's not get ahead of ourselves. This could come out, and everyone could hate us, and we'd never work again. So, let's not have to sit around for a year while we wait for another movie to come out that we know people aren't going to like.' So, we were like, 'Let's learn from this, and see what works, and what doesn't.' But we definitely have an idea of where we would go [with] this branch of the story and hopefully we get a chance to do it."

In September 2018, producer Jason Blum said that "we will do a sequel if the movie performs". By October 2018, after the film's opening weekend, McBride confirmed that early development on a sequel had begun. In February 2019, Collider exclusively confirmed Scott Teems was in talks to write the script, having collaborated with Blumhouse Productions on several projects in development. Teems had also written a story treatment for the film prior to the negotiations. Blum, Malek Akkad and Bill Block returned as producers, while Jamie Lee Curtis, Judy Greer and Andi Matichak reprised their roles.

=== Pre-production ===
In June 2019, it was reported that a sequel would begin filming in September 2019, with Green returning to write the script and direct and Curtis, Greer, and Matichak reprising their roles from the 2018 film. On July 8, 2019, Bloody Disgusting reported that the studio was not only considering filming two sequels back to back, but also releasing both of them in October 2020. Green had worked with McBride and co-writer Jeff Fradley to map out two films before realizing they had enough material to make a trilogy. On July 19, 2019, Universal Pictures revealed the titles and release dates of two sequels were announced: Halloween Kills, set to be released on October 16, 2020, and Halloween Ends, set to be released on October 15, 2021. Green would direct both films and co-write the scripts with McBride, and Curtis would reprise her role in both films. Teems was confirmed as a co-writer for Halloween Kills, while Paul Brad Logan and Chris Bernier were announced as co-writers of Halloween Ends.

Casting for extras was announced in late August 2019.

=== Casting ===
On July 26, 2019, it was confirmed that Nick Castle will return for both sequels for some scenes as Michael Myers with James Jude Courtney again playing Myers for the majority of the films. On August 26, 2019, it was announced that Anthony Michael Hall would join the cast as Tommy Doyle, a character portrayed by Brian Andrews in the original Halloween film. Paul Rudd, who played Doyle in Halloween: The Curse of Michael Myers, was approached to reprise his role, but declined as he was unavailable due to his commitments to Ghostbusters: Afterlife.

On August 30, 2019, it was announced that Kyle Richards would reprise her role as Lindsey Wallace from the original film. Charles Cyphers was officially confirmed to return in October, his first role in a film since Methodic in 2007. On September 5, 2019, it was reported that Robert Longstreet would play Lonnie Elam, a character from the original film. On September 27, 2019, Nancy Stephens, who portrayed Nurse Marion Chambers in the original film and its sequels Halloween II and Halloween H20: 20 Years Later, was confirmed to be reprising her role. Jibrail Nantambu is set to reprise his role as Julian from the previous film; while Victoria Paige Watkins and Brian F. Durkin were confirmed as members of the cast. In May 2021, it was revealed that Thomas Mann would appear in an undisclosed role.

=== Filming ===
On July 19, 2019, a spokesperson for Blumhouse Productions confirmed that Halloween Kills and its sequel Halloween Ends will commence production and filming in Wilmington, North Carolina at the same time. The movie commenced filming September 16, 2019. According to a film permit obtained from the city, there would be a news reporter scene giving updates on the events of the 2018 film. Filming in Wilmington on September 20 to 21 involved a car wreck scene. Actress Kyle Richards broke her nose whilst filming an action sequence with Michael Myers. Richards kept the incident to herself as to not be replaced by a stunt double. Additional photography included simulated gunfire scenes on September 27, September 30, and October 1. Additional filming occurred on October 16, 2019. Curtis began filming her scenes on October 7 and wrapped them by October 19. Filming concluded on November 3, 2019. The final confrontation where Michael murders the mob formed by Tommy Doyle was filmed on a "lazy susan"-esque rotating stage that circled around the camera.

In an interview, Andi Matichak revealed that filming was planned back-to-back with Halloween Ends but did not occur due to the "intense schedule".

=== Music ===
John Carpenter, Cody Carpenter and Daniel Davies, returned to score for Halloween Kills, after previously scoring for Halloween (2018). Much of the film's score has been completed before the COVID-19 pandemic. The album was released in iTunes on October 14, 2021, and in all digital platforms on October 15. Sacred Bones Records published the soundtrack in CD, vinyl edition and cassettes. It was led by three singles: "Unkillable", "Rampage" and "Michael's Legend", and an end-credits song performed by the Swedish rock band Ghost, "Hunter's Moon" was also released as a single, but not included in the soundtrack. The album debuted at number 9 in Billboard Top Album Sales for the week beginning October 23.

== Release ==
Halloween Kills premiered at the 78th Venice International Film Festival on September 8, 2021. The film was initially set to be theatrically released on October 16, 2020, but in July 2020, it was delayed to October 15, 2021, due to the COVID-19 pandemic. On September 9, 2021, it was announced that in addition to being released in theaters the film would also be streamed on paid tiers of Peacock for 60 days. The film, along with the extended cut, was released on HBO Max on March 18, 2022.

=== Extended cut ===
An extended version of the film, simply titled The Extended Cut, was released on iTunes on December 14, 2021, in the United States and Canada, and on DVD, Blu-ray, and Ultra HD Blu-ray on January 11, 2022. This version of the film was announced by director David Gordon Green upon the theatrical release of the film, and contains "more thrills, more kills, and an alternate ending". Green told Collider, "This is the director's cut through and through, but there's an additional scene that we filmed that was scripted. [...] We ended up lifting it when I became more confident of where we're going to pick up in the next movie [Ends], it felt it didn't feel authentic to where we're going to go. So we lifted it.", referring to the ending scene where Michael suddenly kills Karen. The alternate ending involves Laurie attempting to call Karen - initially unaware of what just happened - only for Michael to pick up and, upon hearing his breathing on the phone and knowing Karen is dead, warns that she is coming for him. She then takes the knife from her bedside and leaves the hospital determined to find him. The ending would have suggested the sequel would take place the same night as Kills (in 2018), instead of in 2022 as revealed later by Green. The extended cut, along with the theatrical cut, was released on HBO Max on March 18, 2022.

== Reception ==
=== Audience viewership ===
According to Samba TV, the film was watched in 2.8 million households in its first 30 days on Peacock.

=== Box office ===
Halloween Kills grossed $92 million in the United States and Canada, and $41.4 million in other territories, for a total worldwide gross of $133.4 million; the film sold approximately 9,046,426 during its initial domestic theatrical release.

In the United States and Canada, Halloween Kills was released alongside The Last Duel, and was initially projected to gross $35–40 million from 3,700 theaters in its opening weekend. The film made $4.85 million from Thursday night previews, the biggest for both an R-rated title and a horror film amid the pandemic, surpassing A Quiet Place Part II's $4.8 million. After making $22.8 million on its first day (including previews), which also immediately surpassed the lifetime totals of Halloween III, 4, 5, and Curse of Michael Myers, estimates were raised to $50 million. It went on to debut to $49.4 million (53.7% of total gross), topping the box office and marking the best opening for an R-rated film amid the pandemic (nearly doubling The Suicide Squad's $26.2 million), though the record was later broken by John Wick: Chapter 4 which opened to $73.5 million in early 2023. It fell 71% in its second weekend to $14.5 million, finishing second behind newcomer Dune, then made $8.7 million the following weekend, before falling to seventh in its fourth weekend with $2.3 million.

=== Critical response ===
On the review aggregator website Rotten Tomatoes, the film holds an approval rating of 38% based on 276 reviews, and an average rating of 5/10. The site's critical consensus reads, "Halloween Kills should satisfy fans in search of brute slasher thrills, but in terms of advancing the franchise, it's a bit less than the sum of its bloody parts." On Metacritic, the film has a weighted average score of 42 out of 100, based on 45 critics, indicating "mixed or average" reviews. Audiences surveyed by CinemaScore gave the film an average grade of "B−" on an A+ to F scale, lower than the "B+" earned by its 2018 predecessor, while those polled at PostTrak gave it a 69% positive score, with 52% saying they would definitely recommend it.

Barry Hertz of The Globe and Mail was positive in his review, saying that the film was "brimming with odd decisions", but added: "there is something entertaining, or maybe just enjoyably puzzling, about what Gordon Green and McBride think a Michael Myers movie could or ought to be." Reviewing the film for TheWrap, Asher Luberto praised the return of cast members from the 1978 film and wrote: "Green seems less interested in rewriting the Halloween playbook than in giving audiences what they came for, from ghastly scares to a ghoulish score. It's a strategy that promises to make the series as immortal as Michael Myers himself." /Film's Marshall Shaffer gave the film 7.5/10 and said: "There's good reason to be excited for how Green will bring this all to a head in his grand finale. Halloween Kills manages to put a playful but petrifying spin on mythology without resorting to cheap self-referentiality." Brian Truitt of USA Today gave the film 2.5/4 stars, saying that it was "gruesomely brutal as a night spent with Michael Myers should be", but added that it "loses some of its skull-crushing effectiveness juggling rampant carnage and social commentary."

Owen Gleiberman of Variety wrote: "Halloween night may be Michael Myers' masterpiece, but Halloween Kills is no masterpiece. It's a mess — a slasher movie that's almost never scary, slathered with 'topical' pablum and with too many parallel plot strands that don't go anywhere." Kyle Smith of National Review criticized the violence in the film, writing: "the only element that excites more than it nauseates is the terrific score", and called the film "grueling, enervating, and dispiriting". David Fear of Rolling Stone wrote: "Kills comes incredibly close to erasing every ounce of good will that Green's revolutionary redo built up. It murders the desire to ever watch another Halloween movie again." Brian Lowry of CNN said that the film was "odd on various levels, starting with the wholly misguided attempt to weave a half-baked message into its bloody mayhem", and wrote: "If the previous movie conjured a bit of excitement by eradicating everything that had transpired after the original, that sense of novelty has quickly worn off."

Richard Roeper of the Chicago Sun-Times gave the film a score of 2/4 stars, describing it as a "thudding disappointment" and "an inconsistent, sloppy mess." Kevin Maher of The Times gave the film 1/5 stars, describing it as a "depressingly mechanical gorefest" that "has nothing to offer the sentient viewer". Clarisse Loughrey of The Independent gave the film 2/5 stars, describing it as a "lurching, directionless corpse of a film" that "relies far too much on the knowledge that it has one more instalment … in which to figure out what the whole blasted trilogy should be about." Linda Marric of The Jewish Chronicle also gave the film 2/5 stars, deeming it "a shambolic, risible mess which is further hampered by a total absence of genuinely scary bits." Robbie Collin of The Daily Telegraph also gave the film 2/5 stars, writing: "Halloween Kills certainly feels like more Halloween. But the game board is left exactly as it was found in readiness for round 13; the only thing that advances is the body count." However, Aedan Juvet of Bleeding Cool referred to the film as a "worthwhile middle chapter of a trilogy."

=== Accolades ===
Award	Date of ceremony	Category	Recipient(s)	Result	Ref.
People's Choice Awards	December 7, 2021	The Drama Movie of 2021	Halloween Kills	Nominated	
People's Choice Awards	December 7, 2021	The Drama Movie Star of 2021	Jamie Lee Curtis	Nominated	
Fangoria Chainsaw Awards	May 15, 2022	Best Score	John Carpenter, Cody Carpenter, and Daniel Davies	Won	
Fangoria Chainsaw Awards	May 15, 2022	Best Makeup FX	Christopher Nelson	Won	
MTV Movie & TV Awards	June 5, 2022	Best Villain	James Jude Courtney	Nominated	
MTV Movie & TV Awards	June 5, 2022	Most Frightened Performance	Kyle Richards	Nominated	

== Sequel ==
In July 2019, the film was announced alongside a sequel titled Halloween Ends, which was released on October 14, 2022, in theaters and on paid tiers of Peacock for 60 days. While originally developed to be set on the same night as Halloween (2018) and Halloween Kills, the film takes place four years later in 2022. Green described Ends as a "coming-of-age story" and "a more intimate movie" where "some of the characters... have processed the insanity of the circus of the massacre of 2018. And not only that, but they've also processed the world as it's spun so wildly in the last four years."

== See also ==
- List of films set around Halloween
- List of horror films of 2021
