= Christine (soundtrack) =

1989 film soundtrack album

Christine: Music from the Motion Picture

Film score by John Carpenter & Alan Howarth
- Released: 17 October 1989
- Studio: Electric Melody Studios, Glendale, California
- Genre: Electronic; film score
- Length: 33:14
- Label: Varèse Sarabande
- Producer: John Carpenter, Alan Howarth

John Carpenter chronology
They Live (1988)	Christine (1989)	Body Bags (1993)

Alan Howarth chronology
They Live (1988)	Christine (1989)	Halloween 5: The Revenge of Michael Myers (1989)

Professional ratings
Review scores
Source	Rating
AllMusic	3/5 stars

Christine is the score by John Carpenter in association with Alan Howarth to the 1983 film of the same name.

== Development and release ==
Two soundtracks were released, one consisting purely of the music written and composed by John Carpenter and Alan Howarth, the other consisting of the contemporary pop songs used in the film. It was released in 1989 through Varèse Sarabande.

== Track listing ==
No.	Title	Length
1.	"Arnie's Love Theme"	1:15
2.	"Obsessed with the Car"	2:07
3.	"Football Run/Kill Your Kids"	2:42
4.	"The Rape"	1:10
5.	"The Discovery"	1:30
6.	"Show Me"	2:36
7.	"Moochie's Death"	2:25
8.	"Junkins"	3:33
9.	"Buddy's Death"	1:27
10.	"Nobody's Home/Restored"	1:44
11.	"Car Obsession Reprise"	1:53
12.	"Christine Attacks (Plymouth Fury)"	2:30
13.	"Talk on the Couch"	1:23
14.	"Regeneration"	1:25
15.	"Darnell's Tonight"	0:13
16.	"Arnie"	1:01
17.	"Undented"	1:54
18.	"Moochie Mix Four"	2:26
Total length:		33:14

== Personnel ==
- John Carpenter – composition, performance, production
- Alan Howarth – sequencing, engineering, mixing, production
- Tom Null – sequencing
- Robert Townson – executive producer
