= Big Trouble in Little China (soundtrack) =

1986 film soundtrack by John Carpenter

Big Trouble in Little China (Original Motion Picture Soundtrack)

Soundtrack album by John Carpenter & Alan Howarth
- Released: 1986
- Studio: Electric Melody Studios, Glendale, California
- Genre: Electronic; rock; film score
- Length: 45:38 (1986 release); 71:35 (1999 release)
- Label: Enigma Records (1986 release); Super Tracks Music Group (1999 release)
- Producer: John Carpenter

John Carpenter chronology
The Fog (1984)	Big Trouble in Little China (1986)	Prince of Darkness (1987)

Alan Howarth chronology
Head Office (1985)	Big Trouble in Little China (1986)	Prince of Darkness (1987)

Alternative cover
- 1999 release

Professional ratings
Review scores
Source	Rating
AllMusic	3/5 stars
Soundtrack.Net	3.5/5 stars

Big Trouble in Little China is a soundtrack produced by John Carpenter for the film of the same name.

With the soundtrack, Carpenter wanted to avoid the usual clichés finding that “other scores for American movies about Chinese characters are basically rinky tink, chop suey music. [He] didn't want that for Big Trouble”. Carpenter instead opted for his trademark synthesizer score mixed with rock ‘n’ roll music with a slight mystical Chinese overtone.

A soundtrack album, produced by Carpenter, was released in 1986 on Enigma Records and featured nine tracks for a total of just over 45 minutes. In 1999, an expanded edition was released by Super Tracks Music Group. It included two versions of Carpenter and his band, The Coupe De Villes (consisting of himself, Nick Castle, and Tommy Lee Wallace), performing the "Big Trouble in Little China" theme song, three tracks from Alan Howarth's previously unreleased score for Backstabbed (also known as Mørkeleg), and a track from Escape from New York, entitled, "Atlanta Bank Robbery".

== Track listing ==
1986 release
No.	Title	Artist(s)	Length
1.	"Big Trouble In Little China"	The Coupe De Villes	3:13
2.	"Pork Chop Express"		3:40
3.	"The Alley"		2:00
4.	"Here Comes the Storms"		2:20
5.	"Lo Pan's Domain"		4:30
6.	"Escape from Wing Kong"		8:00
7.	"Into the Spirit Path"		7:07
8.	"The Great Arcade"		7:50
9.	"The Final Escape"		6:58
Total length:			45:38

=== 1999 release ===
No.	Title	Artist(s)	Length
1.	"Big Trouble In Little China"	The Coupe De Villes	3:13
2.	"Pork Chop Express"		3:40
3.	"The Alley"		2:00
4.	"Here Comes the Storms"		2:20
5.	"Lo Pan's Domain"		4:30
6.	"Escape from Wing Kong"		8:00
7.	"Into the Spirit Path"		7:07
8.	"The Great Arcade"		10:00
9.	"The Final Escape"		4:47
10.	"Big Trouble In Little China -Reprise-"	The Coupe De Villes	3:08

Backstabbed
No.	Title	Writer(s)	Length
11.	"Opening"	Alan Howarth	3:35
12.	"Alexandra"	Howarth	5:57
13.	"Blue Planet Interlude/Final Stab"	Howarth	5:41

Escape from New York
No.	Title	Length
14.	"Atlanta Bank Robbery"	3:31
Total length:		71:35

Both the 1986 release and 1999 release are out-of-print.

=== 2009/2016 releases ===
Big Trouble in Little China (Limited Edition)

Soundtrack album by John Carpenter & Alan Howarth
- Released: January 2009
- Studio: Electric Melody Studios, Glendale, California
- Genre: Electronic; rock; film score
- Length: 96:29
- Label: La-La Land Records

Professional ratings
Review scores
Source	Rating
Empire	4/5 stars

In 2009, a complete 2CD limited edition of the soundtrack was released by La-La Land Records which includes every note of music from the film, including both versions of the title song, remastered. In 2016, it was re-released as part of the film's 30th anniversary, with new artwork and packaging. Both versions have an error on Pork Chop Express on the intro, it plays slightly fast, then slows down to its normal speed. The original 1986 versions don't have this error, this is because the 2009 and 2016 CD's are mastered from the film's audio master, rather than the original master tapes. This is also audibly evident in the film too.

Disc One
No.	Title	Length
1.	"Prologue"	2:15
2.	"Pork Chop Express (Main Title)"	4:01
3.	"Abduction At Airport"	4:17
4.	"The Alley (Procession)"	1:12
5.	"The Alley (War)"	2:31
6.	"The Storms"	2:42
7.	"Tenement / White Tiger"	3:49
8.	"Here Come The Storms"	4:15
9.	"Wing Kong Exchange"	4:40
10.	"Lo Pan's Domain / Looking For A Girl"	3:16
11.	"Friends Of Yours? / Escape Iron Basis"	7:18
12.	"Escape From Wing Kong"	5:38
13.	"Hide"	4:35
Total length:		50:44

Disc Two
No.	Title	Artist(s)	Length
1.	"Call the Police"		7:32
2.	"Dragon Eyes"		1:12
3.	"Into the Spirit Path"		7:05
4.	"The Great Arcade"		7:53
5.	"The Final Escape (Lo Pan's Demise / Getaway)"		7:02
6.	"Goodbye Jack"		3:14
7.	"Big Trouble In Little China (End Credits - Album Version)"	The Coupe De Villes	3:22
8.	"Stingers Montage"		5:24
9.	"Big Trouble In Little China (Original Version)"	The Coupe De Villes	3:01
Total length:			45:45

== Personnel ==
- John Carpenter – composition, performance, production
- Alan Howarth - synthesizer programming, sequencing, editing, recording

The Coupe De Villes

- John Carpenter
- Nick Castle
- Tommy Lee Wallace

== Reception ==
Carpenter's score was nominated at the 14th Saturn Awards for "Best Music".
