= Halloween 4: The Return of Michael Myers (soundtrack) =

Film score by Alan Howarth
- Released: September 28, 1988
- Studios: Pi West Electronic Music Studio, Glendale, California
- Genres: Electronic; film score
- Length: 38:33
- Label: Varèse Sarabande
- Producer: Alan Howarth

Alan Howarth chronology
Prince of Darkness (1987)	Halloween 4: The Return of Michael Myers (1988)	They Live (1988)

Alternative cover
- 2011 limited edition

Professional ratings
Review scores
Source	Rating
AllMusic	4.5/5 stars

Halloween 4: The Return of Michael Myers is a soundtrack by Alan Howarth for the film of the same name. It was released on September 28, 1988 through Varèse Sarabande. A limited expanded edition was released in 2011 through Alan Howarth Incorporated. It is the first Halloween soundtrack not to be produced by John Carpenter.

== Development ==
The score was performed by Alan Howarth, who had assisted John Carpenter on Halloween II and Halloween III: Season of the Witch. Howarth gained approval from Dwight H. Little before he could accept the offer, creating a new score that referenced the original's but with a synthesizer twist. Howarth also included new tracks such as "Jamie's Nightmare", "Return of the Shape", and "Police Station". The soundtrack was released to compact disc, LP vinyl record, and cassette tape on September 28, 1988.

== Track listing ==
All music is composed by Alan Howarth.

No.	Title	Length
1.	"Halloween 4 – The Return"	3:17
2.	"Jamie's Nightmare"	3:14
3.	"Garage"	2:39
4.	"Be Back by 9:30"	1:57
5.	"Return of the Shape"	6:50
6.	"Schoolhouse"	2:34
7.	"Power Company"	2:52
8.	"Police Station"	3:15
9.	"Downstairs Alone"	3:07
10.	"Myer's Finale"	5:32
11.	"Halloween 4 Reprise"	3:16
Total length:		38:33

2011 limited edition
No.	Title	Length
1.	"Halloween 4 Theme"	1:13
2.	"Halloween 4 Opening"	4:09
3.	"Haddonfield"	3:43
4.	"Darkest Night"	1:48
5.	"He's in the Street"	3:04
6.	"Outside the House"	4:51
7.	"In the Shadows"	3:42
8.	"Basement Terror"	3:00
9.	"Upstairs"	4:43
10.	"The Dream"	1:56
11.	"Still He Kills"	7:06
12.	"On the Roof"	2:36
13.	"Shape Attack"	4:45
14.	"Michael's Finale"	2:43
15.	"Halloween Theme (Reprise)"	3:27
Total length:		52:42

== Personnel ==
- Alan Howarth – composition, performance, production
