= Halloween II (1981 film) =

Film by Rick Rosenthal

- Theatrical release poster
- Directed by: Rick Rosenthal (Note: John Carpenter directed additional scenes, although he went uncredited.)
- Written by: John Carpenter; Debra Hill
- Produced by: Debra Hill; John Carpenter
- Starring: Jamie Lee Curtis; Donald Pleasence
- Cinematography: Dean Cundey
- Edited by: Mark Goldblatt; Skip Schoolnik
- Music by: John Carpenter; Alan Howarth (Note: Carpenter is credited as a composer and performer "in association with" Horwath.)
- Production company: Dino De Laurentiis Corporation
- Distributed by: Universal Pictures
- Release date: October 30, 1981
- Running time: 92 minutes
- Country: United States
- Language: English
- Budget: $2.5 million
- Box office: $25.5 million (North America)

Halloween II is a 1981 American slasher film directed by Rick Rosenthal, in his directorial debut, written and produced by John Carpenter and Debra Hill, and starring Jamie Lee Curtis and Donald Pleasence, who reprise their respective roles as Laurie Strode and Dr. Sam Loomis. It is the second installment in the Halloween film series and serves as a direct sequel to Halloween (1978). The story picks up immediately after the cliffhanger ending of the first film, with Michael Myers (Dick Warlock) following survivor Laurie Strode to the local hospital, while his psychiatrist Dr. Loomis continues his pursuit of him.

Though Carpenter and Hill co-wrote the screenplay to the sequel, Carpenter was reluctant to extend his involvement and declined to direct, instead appointing the direction to Rosenthal. Filming took place in the spring of 1981, primarily at Morningside Hospital in Los Angeles, California, on a budget of $2.5 million. Stylistically, Halloween II reproduces certain key elements that made the original Halloween a success, such as first-person camera perspectives, and was intended to finish the story of Michael Myers and Laurie Strode. It also introduces the plot twist of Strode being the sister of Myers, an element that would form the narrative arc of the series in subsequent films after Halloween II—including Rob Zombie's remake and its sequel—but was dropped from the current series' canon from the 2018 film onwards.

Halloween II was distributed by Universal Pictures, and premiered in the United States on October 30, 1981. The film received mixed reviews from critics and grossed $25 million domestically. A third film with an unrelated story, titled Halloween III: Season of the Witch, was released in 1982. A sequel, Halloween 4: The Return of Michael Myers, was released in 1988. Another sequel, Halloween H20: 20 Years Later, was released in 1998, which acknowledges only the first two films.

== Plot ==
On the night of October 31, 1978, in Haddonfield, Illinois, Laurie Strode is narrowly saved from Michael Myers when his psychiatrist Dr. Sam Loomis shoots him off a balcony. (Note: As depicted in Halloween (1978)) Michael wanders the alleys, stealing a kitchen knife from an elderly couple and killing a teenage girl.

Laurie is taken to Haddonfield Memorial Hospital while Loomis continues his pursuit of Michael, along with Sheriff Leigh Brackett. Loomis mistakes teenager Ben Tramer for Michael due to Ben wearing a similar mask, before Ben is hit by a police car which veers into a nearby van and bursts into flames. The dead bodies of Annie Brackett, Lynda Van Der Klok, and Bob Simms are discovered by the police at the Wallace residence. Upon learning his daughter Annie was murdered by Michael, Sheriff Brackett blames Loomis and abandons the search to inform his wife, leaving Deputy Gary Hunt to take his place.

At the hospital, paramedic Jimmy Lloyd develops an attraction to Laurie, but head nurse Virginia Alves limits the time he spends with her. After hearing a newsflash revealing Laurie's location, Michael makes his way to the hospital. Wandering the halls, he kills security guard Bernard Garrett, Dr. Frederick Mixter, paramedic Budd Scarlotti, and several nurses throughout the night. In her hospital room, Laurie dreams about the time she learned she was adopted, and remembers she once visited a young Michael at the sanitarium. Unable to locate other staff members, Jimmy sends Nurse Jill Franco to the sheriff's department and searches the hospital for Laurie, who is trying to evade Michael. Jill's car fails to start and she sees that every tire in the parking lot has been slashed.

After finding Mrs. Alves' dead body strapped to a gurney, her blood drained by an empty IV needle in her arm, Jimmy slips on a pool of her blood and knocks himself unconscious, giving himself a concussion. Meanwhile, Loomis is informed that Michael broke into the local elementary school earlier that day. He discovers a drawing of a family with a knife stabbed into the figure of "sister", and the word "Samhain" written in blood on the blackboard which, according to Loomis, is Celtic for "Lord of the Dead". His colleague Marion Chambers arrives to escort him back to Smith's Grove on the governor's orders and under the enforcement of US Marshal Terrence Gummell. On the way, Marion tells Loomis that Laurie is Michael's younger sister; she was put up for adoption after the death of Michael's parents, with the records sealed to protect the family.

Realizing that Michael is after Laurie, Loomis forces Gummell at gunpoint to drive to the hospital. Jill finally finds Laurie, only to be killed by Michael, who then pursues Laurie through the hospital. She escapes to the parking lot and hides in a car. Jimmy, still dazed, arrives and tries to start the car but passes out again, causing the horn to blare, which attracts Michael's attention. Loomis, Marion, and Gummell reach the hospital just in time to save Laurie by letting her back into the building and locking Michael out. However, Michael breaks into the hospital by walking through the glass door, and Loomis shoots Michael until he falls down, seemingly dead. While Marion is calling the police on Gummell's radio, the marshal tries to check Michael's pulse as Loomis warns him to stay away, knowing he is not dead. Michael revives and slits Gummell's throat with a scalpel.

Loomis and Laurie run into an operating room, where he gives her Gummell's gun before being stabbed by Michael. Laurie then shoots Michael in both of his eyes, blinding him. As he swings the scalpel around the space violently, the two fill the room with flammable gas. Loomis orders Laurie to run before igniting the gas, immolating himself and Michael in an explosion. Laurie watches as Michael, engulfed in flames, emerges from the fire before finally collapsing. The next morning, she is transferred to another hospital, traumatized but alive, as Michael is shown still burning.

== Cast ==
- Jamie Lee Curtis as Laurie Strode
- Donald Pleasence as Dr. Sam Loomis
- Charles Cyphers as Sheriff Leigh Brackett
- Lance Guest as Jimmy
- Pamela Susan Shoop as Nurse Karen Bailey
- Hunter von Leer as Deputy Gary Hunt
- Tawny Moyer as Nurse Jill Franco
- Ana Alicia as Nurse Assistant Janet Marshall
- Nancy Stephens as Marion Chambers
- Gloria Gifford as Head Nurse Virginia Alves
- Leo Rossi as Budd Scarlotti
- Ford Rainey as Dr. Frederick Mixter
- Jeffrey Kramer as Dr. Graham
- Dick Warlock as Michael Myers
  - Nick Castle and Tony Moran as Michael Myers (archive footage)
- Cliff Emmich as Bernard Garrett
- John Zenda as Marshal Terrence Gummell
- Catherine Bergstrom as Debra Lane
- Alan Haufrect as Robert Mundy
- Lucille Benson as Mrs. Elrod
- Dana Carvey as Barry McNichol
- Bill Warlock as Craig Levant
- Jonathan Prince as Randy Lohnner
- Nancy Loomis as Annie Brackett and as Sally (on phone)
- Jack Verbois as Ben Tramer
- Anne Bruner as Alice Martin
- Anne-Marie Martin as Darcy Essmont (uncredited)
- Kyle Richards as Lindsey Wallace (archive footage)
- Brian Andrews as Tommy Doyle (archive footage)

== Production ==
=== Development ===
John Carpenter and Debra Hill, the writers of the first Halloween, had originally considered setting the sequel a few years after the events of Halloween. They planned to have Michael Myers track Laurie Strode (Jamie Lee Curtis) to her new home in a high-rise apartment building. However, the setting was later changed to Haddonfield Hospital in script meetings. Tommy Lee Wallace, who served on the crew of the original film, stated that "no one was all that excited" over the prospect of a sequel, but producer Irwin Yablans was eager to make a second film. When Yablans approached them about the project, Carpenter and Hill were in the midst of developing The Fog (1980). According to Yablans, he had planned to produce The Fog, but that Robert Rehme intervened and acquired production rights with his company, Embassy Pictures as part of a two-picture deal with Hill and Carpenter. A lawsuit between Yablans and Rehme ensued, after which it was determined that Embassy would retain rights to The Fog, while Yablans's Compass International Pictures would be guaranteed production rights for Halloween II.

The sequel was intended to conclude the story of Michael Myers and Laurie Strode. The third film, Halloween III: Season of the Witch, released a year later, contained a plot that deviated wholly from that of the first two films. Wallace, who went on to direct Halloween III, stated, "It is our intention to create an anthology out of the series, sort of along the lines of Night Gallery, or The Twilight Zone, only on a much larger scale, of course." When asked, in a 1982 interview, what happened to Myers and Dr. Sam Loomis (Donald Pleasence), Carpenter flatly answered, "The Shape is dead. Pleasence's character is dead, too, unfortunately." This would later be retconned and both Michael and Loomis would return for multiple later installments.

=== Writing ===
The screenplay of Halloween II was written by Carpenter and Hill. Carpenter described that his writing of the screenplay "mainly dealt with a lot of beer, sitting in front of a typewriter saying 'What the fuck am I doing? I don't know.'" In a 1981 interview with Fangoria magazine, Hill mentions the finished film differs somewhat from initial drafts of the screenplay. Upon receiving the script, Yablans was disappointed as he felt it was "pedestrian and predictable." The plot twist of Laurie being Michael's sister was initially never planned by Carpenter or Hill, but was conceived, according to Carpenter, "purely as a function of having decided to become involved in the sequel to the movie where I didn't think there was really much of a story left." He would later refer to this plotline as "silly" and "foolish," though it would go on to shape the narrative arc of the series in the subsequent films. It was retconned in Halloween, the 2018 rebooted sequel of the franchise, when Laurie's granddaughter Allyson Nelson (Andi Matichak) dismisses the idea that Laurie and Michael are siblings as "just something people made up." Screenwriter Danny McBride felt that Michael Myers would be scarier if he had no motive for killing people.

Film critic Roger Ebert, who praised the first film, notes that the plot of the sequel was rather simple: "The plot of Halloween II absolutely depends, of course, on our old friend the Idiot Plot, which requires that everyone in the movie behave at all times like an idiot. That's necessary because if anyone were to use common sense, the problem would be solved and the movie would be over." Hill rebuffed such critiques by arguing that "in a thriller film, what a character says is often irrelevant, especially in those sequences where the objective is to build up suspense."

Historian Nicholas Rogers suggests that a portion of the film seems to have drawn inspiration from the "contemporary controversies surrounding the holiday itself." He points specifically to the scene in the film when Gary (Ty Mitchell), a young boy in a pirate costume, arrives at Haddonfield Memorial Hospital with a razor blade lodged in his mouth, a reference to the urban legend of tainted Halloween candy. According to Rogers, "The Halloween films opened in the wake of the billowing stories about Halloween sadism and clearly traded on the uncertainties surrounding trick-or-treating and the general safety of the festival."

=== Casting ===
The main cast of Halloween reprised their roles in the sequel with the exception of Nick Castle, who had played the adult Michael Myers in the original. Veteran English actor Donald Pleasence continued the role of Dr. Sam Loomis, who had been Myers' psychiatrist for the past 15 years while Myers was institutionalized at Smith's Grove Sanitarium. Curtis (then 22), again played the teenage babysitter Laurie Strode, revealed in this film as the younger sister of Myers. Curtis required a wig for the role of long-haired Laurie Strode, as she had her own hair cut shorter at the time. Charles Cyphers reprised the role of Sheriff Leigh Brackett, though his character disappears from the film when the corpse of his daughter Annie Brackett (Nancy Loomis) is discovered. Nancy Loomis appears as Annie in a cameo role as her father, Sheriff Brackett, closes her eyes as her corpse is being taken out of the house in a stretcher. Actor Hunter von Leer heads the manhunt for Myers in the role of Deputy Gary Hunt. He admitted in an interview that he had never watched Halloween before being cast in the part. He stated, "I did not see the original first but being from a small town, I wanted the Deputy to have compassion." Nancy Stephens, who played Loomis's nurse colleague Marion Chambers in the original, also reprised the character and was given a more important role, revealing to Loomis the family connection between Laurie and Michael.

Stunt performer Dick Warlock played Michael Myers (as in Halloween, listed as "The Shape" in the credits), replacing Castle who was beginning a career as a director. Warlock's previous experience in film was as a stunt double in films, such as The Green Berets (1968) and Jaws (1975), and the 1974 television series Kolchak: The Night Stalker. In an interview, Warlock explained how he prepared for the role since Myers received far more screen time in the sequel than the original. Warlock said:

[I watched the scenes] where Laurie is huddled in the closet. Michael breaks through. She grabs a hanger and thrusts it up and into his eyes. Michael falls down and Laurie walks to the bedroom doorway and sits down. In the background, we see Michael sit up and turn towards her to the beat of the music. ... Anyway, that and the head tilt were the things I carried with me into Halloween II. I didn't really see that much more to hang my hat on in the first film.

Warlock also claims that the mask he wore was the same one Nick Castle used in the first film. Hill confirmed this in an interview.

The supporting cast consisted of relatively unknown actors and actresses, except for Jeffrey Kramer and Ford Rainey. Most of the cast previously or later appeared in films or television series by Universal Studios (the distributor for this film). Kramer was previously cast in a supporting role as Deputy Jeff Hendricks in Jaws and Jaws 2 (1978). In Halloween II, Kramer played Dr. Graham, a dentist who examines the charred remains of Ben Tramer (Jack Verbois). Rainey was chosen to play Haddonfield Memorial Hospital's drunk resident doctor, Frederick Mixter. A host of character actors were cast as the hospital's staff. Many were acquaintances of director Rosenthal. He told an interviewer, "I'd been studying acting with Milton Katselas at the Beverly Hills Playhouse and I brought many people from the Playhouse into Halloween 2." These included Pamela Susan Shoop, Leo Rossi, Ana Alicia and Gloria Gifford. Rossi played the part of Budd Scarlotti, a hypersexual EMS driver; Rossi as well as several others, such as Stephens, had been members of an acting class with Rosenthal.

Shoop played Nurse Karen Bailey, who is scalded to death by Myers in the hospital therapy tub. Featured in the only nude scene in the film, Shoop discussed filming the scene, and recalled getting an ear infection: "[The water] was cold and dirty. They were playing it off like the water was boiling, but it was absolutely freezing! Leo [Rossi] and I were so cold, our teeth were chattering.!" Gifford and Alicia played minor supporting roles as head nurse Mrs. Virginia Alves and orderly Janet Marshall. Actor Lance Guest played an EMS driver, Jimmy Lloyd. The Last Starfighter director Nick Castle (who played Myers in the previous installment) stated in an interview, "When I was assigned to the film, Lance Guest was the first name I wrote down on my list for Alex after seeing him in Halloween II." Castle adds, "He possessed all the qualities I wanted the character to express on the screen, a kind of innocence, shyness, yet determination." Future Saturday Night Live and Wayne's World star Dana Carvey also appears briefly in a non-speaking role as Barry McNichol, wearing a blue baseball cap and receiving instructions from the TV reporter Debra Lane (Catherine Bergstrom). Carvey originally had a bit of a bigger role, including some speaking scenes, before his scenes ultimately got mostly cut.

=== Filming ===
Halloween executive producers Irwin Yablans and Moustapha Akkad invested heavily in the sequel, boasting a much larger budget than its predecessor: $2.5 million (compared to only $320,000 for the original). Italian film producer Dino De Laurentiis assisted in financing the production. There was discussion of filming Halloween II in 3-D; Hill said, "We investigated a number of 3-D processes ... but they were far too expensive for this particular project. Also, most of the projects we do involve a lot of night shooting—evil lurks at night. It's hard to do that in 3-D." Dean Cundey, the director of photography on the first film, reprised his role as cinematographer, opting out of shooting Tobe Hooper's Poltergeist (1982) as he felt a loyalty to Carpenter and Hill.

Halloween II was filmed over a six-week period starting on April 6, 1981, and ending on May 18, 1981. Most of the film was shot at Morningside Hospital in Los Angeles, California, and Pasadena Community Hospital in Pasadena. Rosenthal recalled filming at Pasadena Community Hospital as being extraordinarily difficult due to its proximity to an airport, which disrupted shooting frequently due to incoming airplanes.

==== Direction ====
Reluctant to extend his involvement in the film, Carpenter refused to direct and originally approached Tommy Lee Wallace, the art director from the original Halloween, to take the helm. Carpenter told one interviewer: "I had made that film once and I really didn't want to do it again." After Wallace declined, Carpenter chose Rosenthal, a relatively unknown and inexperienced director whose previous credits included episodes of the television series Secrets of Midland Heights (1980–1981). Rosenthal was chosen to direct based on a short film he had made, The Toyer, while a student at the American Film Institute. Debra Hill had also considered directing at one point, but did not want to appear as "just a protégé" of Carpenter.

The opening title of Halloween II, an attempt to connect the film stylistically to Halloween, featuring the lit pumpkin as a back drop to the opening credits.

Stylistically, Rosenthal attempted to recreate the elements and themes of the original film, stating: "conceptually, it's not at all my film. It's a continuation of a John Carpenter and Debra Hill ... film. But in execution, it's my vision." Halloween II opens with a title sequence zooming in on a jack-o'-lantern that splits in half to reveal a human skull, a reference to the original film's title sequence, which featured a similar zoom into the eye of a jack-o'-lantern. The first scene of the film is presented through a first-person camera format in which a voyeuristic Michael Myers enters an elderly couple's home and steals a knife from the kitchen. Rosenthal attempts to reproduce the "jump" scenes present in Halloween, but does not film Myers on the periphery, which is where he appeared in many of the scenes of the original. Under Rosenthal's direction, Myers is the central feature of a majority of the scenes. Rosenthal also stated that he attempted to replicate the visual elements of the previous film "until we [the audience] get to the hospital ... Once we're in there, I got a certain freedom: long corridors, moody dark lighting, all of that." In an interview with Luke Ford, Rosenthal explains:

The first movie I ever did [Halloween II] was a sequel, but it was supposed to be a direct continuation. It started one minute after the first movie ended. You have to try hard to maintain the style of the first movie. I wanted it to feel like a two-parter. You have the responsibility and the restraints of the style that's been set. It was the same crew. My philosophy was to do more of a thriller than a slasher movie.

Halloween II departs significantly from its predecessor by incorporating more graphic violence and blood, making it far more similar to slasher films of its time. This scene depicts Michael bleeding after being shot in both eyes.

The decision to include more gore and nudity in the sequel was not made by Rosenthal, who contends that it was Carpenter who chose to make the film much bloodier than the original. Wallace explains: "Since the release of Halloween, horror movies had changed. There was inflation involved in terms of violence and gore and what you saw onscreen, to the point that John [Carpenter] felt like he was in a box—he could not do the same thing that Halloween had been doing." According to the film's official website, "Carpenter came in and directed a few sequences to clean up some of Rosenthal's work." One reviewer of the film notes that "Carpenter, concerned that the picture would be deemed too 'tame' by the slasher audience, re-filmed several death scenes with more gore." When asked about his role in the directing process, Carpenter told an interviewer:

That's a long, long story. That was a project I got involved in as a result of several different kinds of pressure. I had no influence over the direction of the film. I had an influence in the post-production. I saw a rough cut of Halloween II, and it wasn't scary. It was about as scary as Quincy. So we had to do some post-production work to bring it at least up to par with the competition.

Rosenthal was not pleased with Carpenter's changes. He reportedly complained that Carpenter "ruined [my] carefully paced film." Regardless, many of the graphic scenes contained elements not seen before in film. Roger Ebert claims, "This movie has the first close-up I can remember of a hypodermic needle being inserted into an eyeball." The film is often categorized as a splatter film rather than a slasher film due to the elevated level of gore.

=== Music ===
Carpenter composed and performed the score with Alan Howarth, who had previously been involved in Star Trek: The Motion Picture (1979), and worked with Carpenter on several projects including Escape from New York (1981), Halloween III: Season of the Witch (1982), Christine (1983), and Prince of Darkness (1987). The film's score was a variation of Carpenter compositions from Halloween, particularly the main theme's familiar piano melody played in a compound 5/4 time rhythm. The score was performed on a synthesizer organ rather than a piano. One reviewer for the BBC described the revised score as having "a more gothic feel." The reviewer asserted that it "doesn't sound quite as good as the original piece", but "it still remains a classic piece of music."

The film featured the song "Mr. Sandman" performed by The Chordettes, which would later be featured in the opening scenes of Halloween H20: 20 Years Later (1998). Reviewers commented on the decision to include this song in the film, calling the selection "interesting" and "not a song you would associate with a film like this." The song worked well to "mimic Laurie's situation (sleeping a lot), [making] the once innocent sounding lyrics seem threatening in a horror film."

=== Post-production ===
The film was principally edited by Mark Goldblatt. Skip Schoolnik, an editor who had simultaneously been commissioned to edit the television cut for the original Halloween, was invited by Carpenter and Hill to view the cut of Halloween II at the time. Schoolnik and Carpenter spent a weekend editing Goldblatt's cut of the film, ultimately excising around 14 minutes. During this editing process, Carpenter realized that an unresolved plot hole was present: It was unclear as to how Michael Myers was able to track Laurie to the hospital. To resolve this, Carpenter shot a sequence featuring a young boy (Lance Warlock) walking on the street with a portable radio playing a news broadcast concerning the murders and Laurie's whereabouts; as the boy walks along, he accidentally bumps into Michael, and resumes walking. According to Warlock, Carpenter also shot the close-up footage of Michael's burning body shown at the film's conclusion, as well as the murder sequence of Alice Martin (Anne Bruner), a teenage girl who is killed by Michael early in the film.

== Release ==
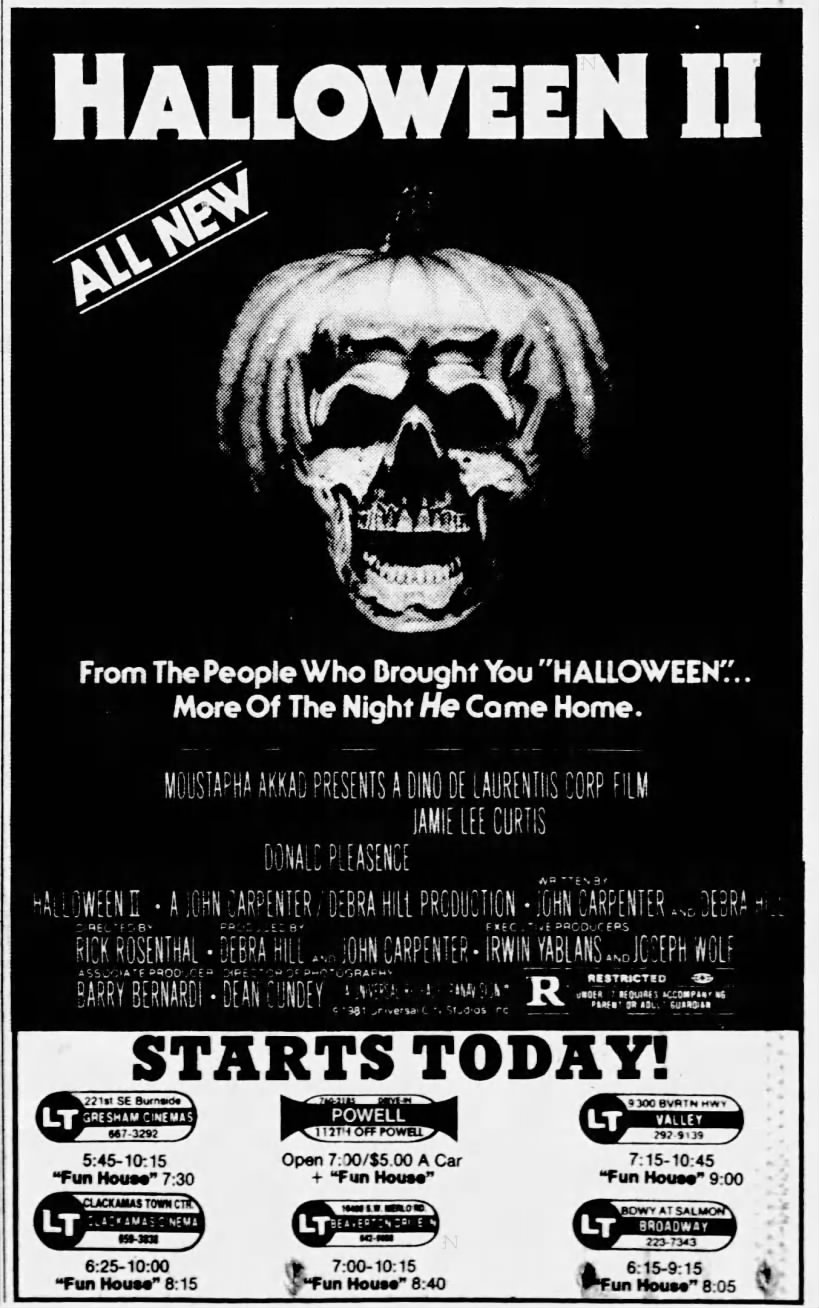
Newspaper advertisement promoting Halloween II, The Oregonian (October 30, 1981)

The theatrical distribution rights to Halloween II were sold to Universal Pictures. To advertise Halloween II, Universal printed a poster that featured a skull superimposed onto a pumpkin. This imagery is described by film historian and sociologist Robert E. Kapsis as "an unmistakable horror motif." Kapsis points out that by 1981 horror had "become a genre non grata" with critics. The effect of this can be seen in the distributor's promotion of the film as horror while at the same time stressing that the sequel, like its predecessor, "was more a quality suspense film than a 'slice and dice' horror film." Use of the tagline More Of The Night HE Came Home—a modified version of the original Halloween tagline—hoped to accomplish the same task. Universal released the film on October 30, 1981, in the United States on 1,211 screens. Pleasence hosted the Halloween episode of Saturday Night Live to promote the film on October 31, 1981.

Internationally, Halloween II was released throughout Europe, but it was banned in West Germany from December 1990 until January 2024 and Iceland due to the graphic violence and nudity; a later 1986 release on home video was banned in Norway. The film was shown in Canada, Australia, the Philippines, and Japan.

=== Television cut ===
An alternate version of Halloween II (sometimes referred to as 'The Television Cut') has aired on network television since the early 1980s, with most of the graphic violence and blood edited out and many minor additional scenes added, while others are removed. This cut of the film was released in 2012 by Scream Factory on their Collector's Edition Blu-ray disc, and again in 2014 as a standalone DVD accompanying the "Complete Collection" Deluxe Edition Blu-ray set, which features the entire series.

The television cut runs approximately 92 minutes, roughly one minute less than the theatrical version. There are also many edits. The murder of Dr. Mixter is presumed to still happen, but remains off camera; as does Janet's, although dialogue indicates she might have also gone home at the end of her shift instead of being killed. The scene where Michael stalks Alice is recut to imply that he attacks and kills her neighbor Mrs. Elrod (Lucille Benson) instead. Jimmy's discovery of Mrs. Alves (Gifford) dead and his subsequent slipping in the pool of blood has been significantly shortened (or removed altogether in some prints) and moved just prior to the explosion which kills Myers and Loomis. Jill's (Tawny Moyer) stabbing is less graphic, and a moan from the ground implies she might have survived it. Also added are scenes of Michael cutting the power (explaining the dark setting throughout the latter half of the film) and a power generator kicking in. There is also extra dialogue between Laurie and Jimmy, Laurie and Mrs. Alves, Janet and Karen Bailey (Shoop), Karen and Bernard Garrett (Cliff Emmich), Bud Scarlotti (Rossi) and Karen, Jill and Jimmy. Another notable difference is the killing of Marshal Terrence Gummell (John Zenda). In the theatrical version his throat is slit, while in the TV version it is softened, with Michael grabbing him and stabbing him from behind (with no detail shown). While the theatrical version ends with the deaths of Michael Myers and Dr. Loomis and leaves the audience in a gray area as to whether Jimmy survives, the television cut features an extended ending showing Jimmy alive (with a bandaged head wound from his slip) in the ambulance with Laurie Strode. They hold hands and Laurie says, "We made it."

=== Home media ===
Halloween II was first released on VHS, Capacitance Electronic Disc, and LaserDisc in 1982 by MCA/Universal Home Video and later by Goodtimes Home Video. In 1998, Goodtimes released the film on DVD in a non-anamorphic version. Three years later, on September 18, 2001, Universal Home Video released an anamorphic widescreen DVD.

The film received its first North American Blu-ray released on September 13, 2011, through Universal, packaged as a 30th Anniversary Edition. This release sparked controversy immediately due to the fact that Universal removed the billing credit "Moustapha Akkad Presents" and replaced it with "Universal, An MCA Company, Presents..." in a font that did not match the rest of the opening credits. Akkad's son, Malek, called the stunt "disgusting. It's a disgrace ... objectively, any horror fan would find this as an insult to the man who has done so much to the series. And to come after his tragic death, he's not even around to defend himself. It's classless. I'm talking to Universal now and they're 'looking into it.'" However, Akkad was still credited on the packaging. Fans immediately called for a boycott of the disc and set up a Facebook page. On November 28, Universal began sending out emails announcing that the revised Blu-ray was now available and for owners of the previous disc to provide the studio with their "address and daytime phone number" to receive replacements.

Scream Factory, a subsidiary of Shout! Factory, re-released the film in a 2-disc Collector's Edition Blu-ray on September 18, 2012, with new special features, including two audio commentaries, two "behind-the-scenes" featurettes, deleted scenes, an alternate ending, the theatrical trailer, TV and radio spots, and a still gallery. The Collector's Edition also contains the television cut, along with a downloadable script of the film. This Blu-ray release restores the Akkad credit. The Scream Factory Blu-ray was repackaged and re-released in 2014 as part of the company's "Complete Collection", which features the entire film series.

In October 2021, Scream Factory released Halloween II on 4K Ultra HD. The film was scanned from the original camera negative, and the transfer was approved by cinematographer Dean Cundey. Audio options include a new Dolby Atmos mix as well as the previous DTS-HD 5.1 mix and the film's original two channel mix presented in DTS-HD 2.0. The included Blu-ray also features the new 4K scan and Atmos mix. A third DVD also includes the TV cut that was available in Scream Factory's previous collector's editions.

In Japan, a Blu-ray was released in 2013 which featured the original Nippon TV Japanese dub. In Germany, NSM Records released Blu-ray and 4K UHD editions in 2024, including the uncut theatrical version, after the film's previous confiscation order was lifted.

=== Merchandising ===
Trick or Treat Studios has released a series of officially licensed Halloween II masks, costumes, and props from Universal Studios, beginning in October 2012. Some of these include the Halloween II Michael Myers mask, Halloween II Michael Myers mask with blood tears, Michael Myers props, and Michael Myers' coveralls. In 2023, an officially licensed tabletop board game based on the film, produced by Stop the Killer and Fright-Rags, was announced.

=== Novelization ===
An adaptation of the screenplay was printed as a mass market paperback in 1981 by horror and science-fiction writer Dennis Etchison under the pseudonym Jack Martin. Etchison's novelization was distributed by Kensington Books and became a bestseller. It also features captioned black and white stills from the film at the beginning of each chapter.

== Reception ==
=== Box office ===
The film grossed $7,446,508 on its opening weekend, ranking number one at the box office, and ultimately went on to gross $25,533,818; the film sold approximately 9,184,827 tickets during its initial theatrical domestic run, less than half the tickets sold by its 1978 predecessor but still ranking fourth overall in the Halloween franchise's sales. While the gross earnings of the sequel paled in comparison to the original's $47 million, it was a success in its own right, exceeding the earnings of other films of the same genre released in 1981: Graduation Day ($23.9 million), Friday the 13th Part 2 ($21.7 million), Omen III: The Final Conflict ($20.4 million) and The Howling ($18 million). Halloween II was a box office success, becoming the second-highest grossing horror film of 1981 behind An American Werewolf in London ($30.5 million).

=== Critical response ===
On the review aggregator website Rotten Tomatoes, 27% of 108 critics' reviews are positive. The website's consensus reads: "Its visual style preserves the chilling mood of its predecessor, yet Halloween II emerges as a lesser imitation rather than a worthy successor, amping up the body count to numbing effect." Metacritic, which uses a weighted average, assigned the film a score of 40 out of 100, based on 11 critics, indicating "mixed or average" reviews.

Several critics were unwelcoming to the film's ramped-up violence, including Kevin Thomas of the Los Angeles Times, who lambasted the film for its "reprehensible content," summarizing that "Halloween II, as a reprise, simply piles up a greater number of corpses." Roman Cooney of the Calgary Herald noted that while the film is "not the bloodbath other movies of its ilk have been, several of the murder scenes are so painfully gruesome as to be tasteless and more than merely distressing," and added that the plot is "convenient rather than complex, relying on a cast of characterless individuals like so many dominoes waiting to be toppled." Roger Ebert of the Chicago Sun-Times echoed similar sentiments, writing that Halloween II represented "a fall from greatness" that "doesn't even attempt to do justice to the original." He also commented: "Instead, it tries to outdo all the other violent Halloween rip-offs of the last several years." The Arizona Republic's Michael Maza assessed the film as continuing part of the prominent slasher trend, noting that Carpenter and Hill appear to be "picking up a few tricks from their imitators (most notably Friday the 13th)."

Janet Maslin of The New York Times instead compared the film to other horror sequels and recently released slasher films of the period, rather than to its predecessor: "By the standards of most recent horror films, this—like its predecessor—is a class act." She notes that there "is some variety to the crimes, as there is to the characters, and an audience is more likely to do more screaming at suspenseful moments than at scary ones." Maslin applauded the performance of the cast and Rosenthal, and concluded: "That may not be much to ask of a horror film, but it's more than many of them offer."

Like the original Halloween, this and other slasher films have come under fire from feminist critics. According to historian Nicholas Rogers, some academic critics "have seen the slasher movies since Halloween as debasing women in as decisive a manner as hardcore pornography."

In 1982, the Academy of Science Fiction, Fantasy & Horror Films, USA, nominated the film for two Saturn Awards: Best Horror Film and Best Actor for Pleasence at the 9th Saturn Awards. The film lost to An American Werewolf in London (1981) and Harrison Ford was chosen over Pleasence for his role in Raiders of the Lost Ark (1981), respectively.

Carpenter later said that he considered the film's twist that Laurie and Michael were siblings to be a bad idea and that he only came up with it because he was drunk and looking for more material to include in the NBC television cut of the first film. Quentin Tarantino criticized Halloween II and every sequel that followed in its continuity for the same reason, calling it "fruit from a poison tree because Laurie is not the sister of the Shape."

=== Retrospective ===
David Pirie's review in Time Out gave Halloween II positive marks, stating: "Rosenthal is no Carpenter, but he makes a fair job of emulating the latter's visual style in this sequel." He wrote that the Myers character had evolved since the first film to become "an agent of Absolute Evil." Film historian Jim Harper suggests: "Time has been a little fairer to the film" than original critics. In retrospect, "many critics have come to recognise that it's considerably better than the slew of imitation slashers that swamped the genre in the eighties."

Reviewer Brian Collins posted on his website a review that ends with him coming to the conclusion that "For me, the best way to enjoy Halloween II is not to compare it to the original (which is difficult since it picks up precisely where Carpenter's film left off and takes place in the same night), but to other 1981 slashers, of which there were several dozen." Writing for the Pop Culture review website Father Son Holy Gore, reviewer C.H. Newell gave the film a highly favorable review stating, "I always recommend this as one of the best sequels out there in the horror genre. I’ll continue to do so, even if people think that’s foolishness. This is a great slasher and stands up there alongside the best, including its predecessor." While another reviewer, JA Kerswell gave the film similar high praise of 4-and-a-half stars saying that "It is difficult to improve on perfection - and Carpenter’s original remains the perfect slasher movie in every way. However, against the odds, Halloween II somewhat finds its own voice and is very nearly the perfect horror sequel. Less successful was Carpenter’s intention to lay Michael Myers to rest once and for all. As we know, that didn’t quite work out."

While writing for the horror podcast of Pop Culture Weekly in 2026, Kyle McMahon writes of the film, "Halloween II is never going to be Halloween, and I don't need it to be. What makes the sequel so interesting is how close it physically positions itself to the original while becoming a noticeably different movie. It begins seconds later. It brings back Curtis and Pleasence. Cundey is still shooting Haddonfield. Carpenter and Hill wrote it. Carpenter's music is still pulsing underneath it. Yet the shift in the director's chair changes the texture of everything."

== "Halloween II murders" ==
An incident with minor connections to the film heightened attitudes about the potent effects of media violence on young people. On December 7, 1982, Richard Delmer Boyer of El Monte, California, murdered Francis and Eileen Harbitz, an elderly couple in Fullerton, California, leading to the trial People v. Boyer (1989). The couple were stabbed 43 times by Boyer. According to the trial transcript, Boyer's defense was that he suffered from hallucinations in the Harbitz residence brought on by "the movie Halloween II, which defendant had seen under the influence of PCP, marijuana, and alcohol." The film was played for the jury, and a psychopharmacologist "pointed out various similarities between its scenes and the visions defendant described." Boyer was found guilty and sentenced to death. The incident became known as the "Halloween II Murders" and was featured in a short segment on TNT's MonsterVision, hosted by film critic Joe Bob Briggs. Following the trial, moral critics came to the defense of horror films and rejected calls to ban them. Thomas M. Sipos, for instance, stated,

It would be silly, after all, to ban horror films just because Boyer claims to have thought that he was reenacting Halloween II, or to ban cars because Texas housewife Clara Harris intentionally ran down and killed her husband. Nor does it make sense to ban otherwise useful items such as drugs or guns just because some individuals misuse them.

== See also ==
- List of films set around Halloween

== Sources ==
- Collum, Jason Paul (2004). Assault of the Killer B's: Interviews with 20 Cult Film Actresses. Jefferson, North Carolina: McFarland. ISBN 978-0-786-48041-8.
- Commrie, Anne (1989). Something About the Author. Vol. 89. Farmington Hills, Michigan: Gale. ISBN 978-0-810-32268-4.
- Felsher, Michael (dir.) (2012). The Nightmare Isn't Over: The Making of Halloween II (Documentary). Scream Factory.
- Harper, Jim (2004). Legacy of Blood: A Comprehensive Guide to Slasher Movies. Manchester, England: Critical Vision. ISBN 978-1-900-48639-2.
- Kapsis, Robert E. (1992). Hitchcock: The Making of a Reputation. Chicago: University of Chicago Press. ISBN 0-226-42489-8.
- Leeder, Murray (2014). Halloween. New York: Columbia University Press. ISBN 978-1-906-73386-5.
- Leeder, Murray (2018). Horror Film: A Critical Introduction. New York: Bloomsbury USA. ISBN 978-1-501-31444-5.
- Muir, John Kenneth (1998). Wes Craven: The Art of Horror. Jefferson, North Carolina: McFarland. ISBN 0-7864-1923-7.
- Muir, John Kenneth (2011). Horror Films of the 1980s. Jefferson, North Carolina: McFarland. ISBN 978-0-786-45501-0.
- Rogers, Nicholas (2002). Halloween: From Pagan Ritual to Party Night. Oxford: Oxford University Press. ISBN 0-19-516896-8.
