= Prince of Darkness (soundtrack) =

Album by John Carpenter

Film score by John Carpenter and Alan Howarth
- Released: 1987
- Studio: Electric Melody Studios, Glendale, California
- Genre: Electronic; film score; dark ambient
- Length: 43:37
- Label: Varèse Sarabande
- Producer: Alan Howarth

John Carpenter chronology
| Big Trouble in Little China (1986) | Prince of Darkness (1987) | They Live (1988) |

Alan Howarth chronology
| Big Trouble in Little China (1986) | Prince of Darkness (1987) | Halloween 4: The Return of Michael Myers (1988) |

Prince of Darkness is a soundtrack by John Carpenter and Alan Howarth for the film of the same name. It was released in 1987 through Varèse Sarabande. An expanded edition was released in 2008 through Alan Howarth Incorporated.

== Track listing ==
All music is composed by John Carpenter.

| No. | Title | Length |
|---|---|---|
| 1. | "Opening Titles" | 4:14 |
| 2. | "Team Assembly" | 4:33 |
| 3. | "Darkness Begins" | 2:54 |
| 4. | "A Message from the Future" | 5:30 |
| 5. | "Hell Breaks Loose" | 4:53 |
| 6. | "Mirror Image" | 6:46 |
| 7. | "The Devil Awakens" | 8:57 |
| 8. | "Through the Mirror" | 5:50 |
| Total length: | | 43:37 |

=== 2008 expanded edition ===
Prince of Darkness

Film score by John Carpenter
- Released: 2008
- Studio: Electric Melody Studios, Glendale, California
- Genre: Electronic; film score; dark ambient
- Length: 134:50
- Label: Alan Howarth Incorporated
- Producer: Alan Howarth, Ford A. Thaxton

CD One
| No. | Title | Length |
|---|---|---|
| 1. | "This Is Not a Dream" | 0:51 |
| 2. | "Opening Credits" | 9:15 |
| 3. | "The Underground Church" (Film Version) | 4:01 |
| 4. | "Love at a Distance" | 2:11 |
| 5. | "Will No One Tell Us" | 1:39 |
| 6. | "The Team Assembles" | 9:11 |
| 7. | "Translation" | 2:19 |
| 8. | "Cross Bar" | 0:57 |
| 9. | "Susan's Intuition / We Were Salesmen" | 2:31 |
| 10. | "Psychokinesis" | 0:43 |
| 11. | "Darkness Falls" | 8:22 |
| 12. | "Bug Man" | 0:36 |
| 13. | "A Message from the Future" | 8:09 |
| 14. | "Hell Breaks Loose" | 9:57 |
| Total length: | | 61:14 |

CD Two
| No. | Title | Length |
|---|---|---|
| 1. | "I Have a Message For You" | 0:19 |
| 2. | "Mirror Image / The Only Thing That Matters" | 8:13 |
| 3. | "The Devil Awakens" | 9:50 |
| 4. | "Through the Mirror" | 5:21 |
| 5. | "The Underground Church" (Alternate Version) | 3:53 |
| 6. | "Opening Titles" | 4:11 |
| 7. | "Team Assembly" | 4:29 |
| 8. | "Darkness Begins" | 2:52 |
| 9. | "A Message from the Future" | 5:21 |
| 10. | "Hell Breaks Loose" | 4:22 |
| 11. | "Mirror Image" | 6:44 |
| 12. | "The Devil Awakens" | 8:51 |
| 13. | "Through the Mirror" | 5:31 |
| 14. | "End Credit" | 3:16 |
| Total length: | | 73:36 |

== Personnel ==
- John Carpenter – composition, performance
- Alan Howarth – synthesizer programming, sequencing, mixing, recording, production

== Reception ==
Carpenter's score was nominated at the 15th Saturn Awards for "Best Music".
