= Morningside Hospital =

Morningside Hospital may refer to:

- Morningside Hospital (California), a former hospital in Los Angeles, California, United States
- Morningside Hospital (Oregon), a former psychiatric facility in Portland, Oregon, United States
