= The 3,000 Mile Chase =

Film by Russ Mayberry

- Genre: Action; Drama
- Written by: Roy Huggins; Philip DeGuere
- Directed by: Russ Mayberry
- Starring: Glenn Ford; Cliff De Young
- Theme music composer: Elmer Bernstein
- Country of origin: United States
- Original language: English

Production
- Executive producer: Roy Huggins
- Producer: Jo Swerling Jr.
- Production locations: Antelope Valley, California; Apollo Park - 4555 W. Avenue G, Lancaster, California; Jane Reynolds Park - 716 W. Oldfield Street, Lancaster, California
- Cinematography: Chuck Arnold
- Editors: Larry Lester; Lawrence J. Vallario
- Running time: 98 min
- Production companies: Roy Huggins-Public Arts Productions; Universal Television

Original release
- Network: NBC
- Release: April 6, 1977

The 3,000 Mile Chase is a 1977 NBC action television film directed by Russ Mayberry and starring Glenn Ford and Cliff De Young.

== Premise ==
Secret courier Matt Considine (Cliff De Young) accepts the mission to escort chief witness Dvorak (Glenn Ford) and his wife from San Francisco to a trial in New York City. They have to cover 3,000 dangerous miles, because the drug mob wants to kill them at any price.

== Cast ==
Actor	Role
Glenn Ford	Paul Dvorak - Leonard Staveck
Cliff De Young	Matt Considine - Marty Scanlon
David Spielberg	Frank Oberon
Blair Brown	Rachel Kane
Priscilla Pointer	Emma Dvorak
Marc Alaimo	Richards
Brendan Dillon	Ambrose Finn
Tom Bower	Richette
Lane Allan	Livingston
Michael J. London	Jacoby
Roger Aaron Brown	Prosecutor
John Zenda	Inspector
