= Halloween III: Season of the Witch =

1982 film by Tommy Lee Wallace

- Theatrical release poster
- Directed by: Tommy Lee Wallace
- Written by: Tommy Lee Wallace
- Produced by: Debra Hill; John Carpenter
- Starring: Tom Atkins; Stacey Nelkin; Dan O'Herlihy
- Cinematography: Dean Cundey
- Edited by: Millie Moore
- Music by: John Carpenter; Alan Howarth
- Production companies: Dino De Laurentiis Corporation; Debra Hill Productions
- Distributed by: Universal Pictures
- Release date: October 22, 1982
- Running time: 99 minutes
- Country: United States
- Language: English
- Budget: $4.6 million
- Box office: $14.4 million (United States)

Halloween III: Season of the Witch is a 1982 American science fiction horror film written and directed by Tommy Lee Wallace in his feature-length directorial debut, and starring Tom Atkins, Stacey Nelkin, and Dan O'Herlihy. The third installment in the Halloween film series, it follows a physician who, after one of his patients is murdered, becomes embroiled in a mystery involving a mask-making company, uncovering a sinister plot to use its Halloween masks to kill millions of children. It is the only entry in the Halloween series that does not feature the main antagonist, Michael Myers. Series creators John Carpenter and Debra Hill return as producers and music composers.

The film departs from the slasher genre of the previous two installments, instead featuring a "witchcraft" theme with science fiction aspects. Carpenter and Hill believed that the Halloween series could have been an anthology series of films in the same vein as The Twilight Zone that centered around Halloween night, with each film containing its own distinct characters, setting, and storyline. Director Wallace stated there were many ideas for Halloween-themed films, some of which could have potentially created any number of their own sequels and spin-offs, and that Season of the Witch was meant to be the first.

Released on October 22, 1982, Halloween III: Season of the Witch grossed $14.4 million domestically against a $4.6 million budget, making it the poorest performing film in the Halloween series at the time. Most critics gave the film negative reviews, though reevaluation in later years has given it a strong cult following. After the film's disappointing reception and box office performance, Michael Myers was brought back six years later in Halloween 4: The Return of Michael Myers (1988).

It was the last Halloween film distributed by Universal Pictures until the 2018 film Halloween 36 years later.

== Plot ==
On October 23, 1982, in Northern California, shop owner Harry Grimbridge, clutching a jack-o-lantern Halloween mask, is pursued by mysterious men in suits. He collapses at the shop of Walter Jones, who calls for help.

Harry is taken to a hospital and placed in the care of Dr. Daniel Challis, an alcoholic doctor who has a strained relationship with his ex-wife Linda and two children, Bella and Willie.

Later that night, Harry is murdered by another suited man, who immediately immolates himself in his car. After identifying his body, Harry's daughter, Ellie, meets Daniel to talk about the suspicious events surrounding Harry's death. They decide to investigate and travel to Santa Mira, California, a rural Irish American factory town home to the Silver Shamrock Novelties factory, which made the Halloween mask that Harry carried the night of his death. As they check in to a motel, Daniel learns that Harry had stayed there recently.

Marge Guttman, another motel customer, discovers a microchip on the back of the medallion of one of the masks. As she curiously picks at the medallion with a hairpin, it emits a deadly energy beam into her mouth. Her face is left mutilated, and an insect crawls out of her mouth. Shortly after, men in lab coats take Marge's body away in a Silver Shamrock van. Daniel overhears the factory technicians describing a "misfire" to factory owner Conal Cochran.

While Daniel and Ellie tour the factory the following morning, Ellie finds her father's car, guarded by more men in suits who stop her from getting closer to it. They attempt to call the authorities as they flee, but Daniel cannot reach anyone outside of town by phone. Ellie is kidnapped and taken to the factory; Daniel follows and is captured by the men in suits, revealed to be androids Cochran created.

Cochran takes Daniel to the "final processing" control room and reveals his plan: the microchip on each mask contains a fragment of Stonehenge that he stole. Upon viewing the "Big Giveaway" commercial, the microchips on the masks activate, killing the wearer with brain damage and releasing a swarm of insects and snakes that kill anyone nearby. Cochran demonstrates the power of the masks to Daniel by killing the Kupfer family, who are visiting the factory.

Cochran locks a mask-clad Daniel in a room and explains his plan to resurrect ancient rituals from his native Celtic lands, sacrificing children at Samhain, the pagan celebration of the coming winter. Daniel escapes his bonds and rescues Ellie. He sneaks into the control room, activates the commercial on the screens, and pours a box of the medallions from a ceiling rafter, killing everyone. The Stonehenge remnant kills Cochran and a massive fire destroys the factory.

As they flee, Daniel is attacked by Ellie, who is now actually an android replacement, which he destroys after a struggle and car crash. He flees on foot to Walter's shop and frantically contacts television networks, attempting to stop the commercial broadcast. He succeeds with two networks, but seemingly fails with a third, despite screaming into the telephone, pleading with them to stop.

== Cast ==
- Tom Atkins as Dr. Dan Challis
- Stacey Nelkin as Ellie Grimbridge
- Dan O'Herlihy as Conal Cochran
- Michael Currie as Rafferty
- Ralph Strait as Buddy Kupfer
- Jadeen Barbor as Betty Kupfer
- Brad Schacter as Little Buddy Kupfer
- Garn Stephens as Marge Guttman
- Nancy Kyes as Linda Challis
- Jonathan Terry as Starker
- Al Berry as Harry Grimbridge
- Wendy Wessberg as Teddy
- Essex Smith as Walter Jones
- Maidie Norman as Nurse Agnes
- Paddi Edwards as Secretary
- Dick Warlock as Assassin
- Michelle Walker as Bella Challis
- Joshua John Miller as Willie Challis
- Jamie Lee Curtis as Santa Mira Curfew Announcer/Telephone Operator (uncredited)
- Tommy Lee Wallace as Commercial Announcer

== Themes and analysis ==
Various academics have cited commentary and critiques of late 20th-century American society in Halloween III: Season of the Witch; historian Nicholas Rogers points to an anti-corporate message where an otherwise successful businessman turns "oddly irrational" and seeks to "promote a more robotic future for commerce and manufacture." Cochran's "astrological obsessions or psychotic hatred of children overrode his business sense." Tony Williams argues that the film's plot signified the results of the "victory of patriarchal corporate control." In a similar vein, Martin Harris writes that Halloween III contains "an ongoing, cynical commentary on American consumer culture." Upset over the commercialization of the Halloween holiday, Cochran uses "the very medium he abhors as a weapon against itself." Harris also discusses several of the film's other criticisms of big business, including the unemployment of local workers and the declining quality of mass-produced products.

Professor Victor Gonzalez cites themes of commercialism and media manipulation as significant elements of the film, specifically the "dangers posed by unscrupulous corporate interests and the unchecked power of viral media in shaping our perceptions and realities."

The film also explores themes surrounding the ancient Celtic origins of Halloween, as well as attempting to "modernize witchcraft with 1980s technology."

== Production ==
=== Development ===
When approached about creating a third Halloween film, original Halloween writers John Carpenter and Debra Hill were reluctant to pledge commitment. Carpenter and Hill agreed to participate in the new project only if it was not a direct sequel to Halloween II, which meant Michael Myers would not be the focus of the film. Irwin Yablans and Moustapha Akkad, who had produced the first two films, gave Halloween III a budget of $4.6 million.

Joe Dante was initially appointed to direct the film and recruited veteran British science fiction writer Nigel Kneale to write the original screenplay, mostly because he and Carpenter were admirers of Kneale's Quatermass series. Kneale said his script did not include "horror for horror's sake". He adds, "The main story had to do with deception, psychological shocks rather than physical ones." Kneale asserts that movie mogul Dino De Laurentiis, owner of the film's distribution rights, did not care for it and ordered more graphic violence and gore. While much of the plot remained the same, the alterations displeased Kneale, and he requested that his name be removed from the credits. Director Tommy Lee Wallace was then assigned to revise the script. He explained in the interview the direction that Carpenter and Hill wanted to take the Halloween series, stating, "It is our intention to create an anthology out of the series, sort of along the lines of Night Gallery, or The Twilight Zone, only on a much larger scale, of course." Each year, a new film would be released that focused on some aspect of the Halloween season.

Hill commented that the film was supposed to be "a 'pod' movie, not a 'knife' movie. As such, Wallace drew inspiration from another pod film: Don Siegel's Invasion of the Body Snatchers (1956). The fictional town of Santa Mira was originally the setting of Invasion of the Body Snatchers and named as such in Halloween III as an homage to Siegel's film. Aspects of the plot proved very similar as well, such as the "snatching" bodies and replacing them with androids. Halloween III's subtitle comes from George A. Romero's second film Season of the Witch (1972)—also known as Hungry Wives—but the plot contains no similarity to Romero's story of Joan Mitchell (Jan White), a housewife who becomes involved in witchcraft.

=== Casting ===
The cast of Halloween III: Season of the Witch consisted mostly of character actors whose previous acting credits included cameo appearances on various television series. The exceptions were Tom Atkins and veteran actor Dan O'Herlihy. Cast as surgeon Daniel "Dan" Challis, Atkins had appeared in several John Carpenter films prior to Halloween III. Atkins played Nick Castle in The Fog (1980) and Rehme in Escape from New York (1981). Atkins guest starred in television series such as Harry O, The Rockford Files and Lou Grant. Atkins told Fangoria that he liked being the hero. As a veteran horror actor, he added, "I wouldn't mind making a whole career out of being in just horror movies."

Stacey Nelkin co-starred as Ellie Grimbridge, a young woman whose father Harry (Al Berry) is murdered by Silver Shamrock. She landed the role after a make-up artist working on the film told her about the auditions. In an interview, Nelkin commented on her character: "Ellie was very spunky and strong-minded. Although I like to think of myself as having these traits, she was written that way in the script." Nelkin considered it an "honor" to be playing Jamie Lee Curtis's successor. According to Roger Ebert, Nelkin's performance was the "one saving grace" in the film. Ebert explained, "She has one of those rich voices that makes you wish she had more to say and in a better role . ... Too bad she plays her last scene without a head." Prior to her role as Grimbridge, Nelkin was one of the main characters in the 1980 Mad Magazine movie Up the Academy, which also starred Ralph Macchio.

Wallace originally considered Fred MacMurray for the role of Conal Cochran, the owner of Silver Shamrock and the witch from the film's title (a 3,000-year-old demon in Kneale's original script); however, eternal Irish actor Dan O'Herlihy was ultimately cast in the part. Wallace commented favorably of O'Herlihy, stating: "Dan brought quite a bit of respect for Irish mythology. When I wrote Cochran's long speeches toward the end about the history of Halloween, he added bits that made it more authentic and truer to his Irish heritage." O'Herlihy admitted in an interview with Starlog magazine that he was not particularly impressed with the finished film. When asked what he thought of working in the horror film, O'Herlihy responded, "Whenever I use a Cork accent, I'm having a good time, and I used a Cork accent in [Halloween III]. I thoroughly enjoyed the role, but I didn't think it was much of a picture, no."

Two members of the supporting cast had appeared in the first or second films in the Halloween series: Nancy Kyes portrays Challis's ex-wife Linda; she had appeared in the first two Halloween films as Laurie Strode (Jamie Lee Curtis)'s promiscuous friend Annie Brackett. Stunt performer Dick Warlock, who played Michael Myers in Halloween II, played the lead android assassin. Jamie Lee Curtis provided uncredited voice work as the Santa Mira curfew announcer and the telephone operator. Tommy Lee Wallace provided uncredited voice work as the Silver Shamrock Commercial Announcer.

=== Filming ===
The former Familiar Foods milk bottling plant in Loleta, California was a central filming location

Principal photography took place on location in the small coastal town of Loleta in Humboldt County, California. Familiar Foods, a milk bottling plant in Loleta, served as the Silver Shamrock Novelties factory, but all special effects involving fire, smoke, and explosions were filmed at Post Studios in Los Angeles. The film's opening hospital scene was filmed on location at a real hospital in Lake View Terrace.

Joe Dante was originally hired to direct but quit in order to direct a segment of Twilight Zone: The Movie just weeks before principal photography was scheduled to start on April 19, 1982. The film was the directorial debut of Tommy Lee Wallace, although he was not a newcomer to the Halloween series. Wallace had served as art director and production designer for John Carpenter's original Halloween and he had previously declined to direct Halloween II in 1981. Despite disagreements between Wallace and original script writer Nigel Kneale, the actors reported that Wallace was a congenial director to work with. Stacey Nelkin told one interviewer, "The shoot as a whole was fun, smooth and a great group of people to work with. Tommy Lee Wallace was incredibly helpful and open to discussion on dialogue or character issues."

Although the third film departed from the plot of the first two films, Wallace attempted to connect all three films together through certain stylistic themes. The film's opening title features a digitally animated jack-o'-lantern, an obvious reference to the jack-o'-lanterns that appeared in the opening titles of Halloween and Halloween II. Wallace's jack-o'-lantern is also the catalyst in the Silver Shamrock commercials that activates the masks. Another stylistic reference to the original film is found in the scene where Dr. Challis tosses a mask over a security camera, making the image on the monitor seem to be peering through the eye holes. This is a nod to the scene in which a young Michael Myers murders his sister while wearing a clown mask. Finally, the film contains a brief metafictional reference to the original Halloween, where a television commercial advertising an airing of the film on Halloween night is shown. During the film's finale, Challis's character briefly watches a scene from the film on a television inside the Silver Shamrock factory.

=== Special effects ===
Skeleton and witch masks created by Don Post, worn by Dan Challis's (Tom Atkins) children

Special effects artist Don Post of Post Studios designed the latex masks in the film which included a glow-in-the-dark skull, a lime-green witch and an orange Day-Glo jack-o'-lantern. Hill told Aljean Harmetz, "We didn't exactly have a whole lot of money for things like props, so we asked Post, who had provided The Shape mask for the earlier Halloween [II] ... , if we could work out a deal." The skull and witch masks were adaptations of standard Post Studios masks, but the jack-o'-lantern was created specifically for Halloween III. Post linked the masks of the film to the popularity of masks in the real world.

Every society in every time has had its masks that suited the mood of the society, from the masked ball to clowns to makeup. People want to act out a feeling inside themselves—angry, sad, happy, old. It may be a sad commentary on present-day America that horror masks are the best sellers.

Wallace's use of gore served a different purpose than in Halloween II. According to Tom Atkins, "The effects in this [film] aren't bloody. They're more bizarre than gross." Special effects and makeup artist Tom Burman concurred, stating in an interview, "This movie is really not out to disgust people. It's a fun movie with a lot of thrills in it; not a lot of random gratuitous gore." Many of the special effects were meant to emphasize the theme of the practical joke that peppers the plot. The New York Times film critic Vincent Canby notes, "The movie features a lot of carefully executed, comically horrible special effects . ... " Canby stood as one of the few critics of the time to praise Wallace's directing: "Mr. Wallace clearly has a fondness for the clichés he is parodying and he does it with style."

== Music ==
The soundtrack was composed by John Carpenter and Alan Howarth, who worked together on the score for Halloween II and several other films. Music remained an important element in establishing the atmosphere of Halloween III. Just as in Halloween and Halloween II, there was no symphonic score. Much of the music was composed to elicit "false startles" from the audience.

The score of Halloween III differed greatly from the familiar main theme of the original and sequel. Carpenter replaced the familiar 5/4 piano melody with an electronic theme (9/16 against a steady 4/4) played on a synthesizer with beeping tonalities. Howarth explains how he and Carpenter composed the music for the third film:

The music style of John Carpenter and myself has further evolved in this film soundtrack by working exclusively with synthesizers to produce our music. This has led to a certain procedural routine. The film is first transferred to a time coded video tape and synchronized to a 24 track master audio recorder; then while watching the film we compose the music to these visual images. The entire process goes quite rapidly and has "instant gratification", allowing us to evaluate the score in synch to the picture. This is quite an invaluable asset.

One of the more memorable aspects of the film's soundtrack was the jingle from the Silver Shamrock Halloween mask commercial. Set to the tune of "London Bridge Is Falling Down", the commercial in the film counts down the number of days until Halloween beginning with day eight followed by an announcer's voice (Tommy Lee Wallace) encouraging children to purchase a Silver Shamrock mask to wear on Halloween night:

Eight more days 'til Halloween,
Halloween, Halloween.
Eight more days 'til Halloween,
Silver Shamrock.

== Release ==
=== Marketing ===
Edd Riveria's Halloween III artwork featured on the cover of Fangoria.

In 1983, Edd Riveria, designer of the film's theatrical poster, received a Saturn Award nomination from the Academy of Science Fiction, Fantasy & Horror Films, USA, for Best Poster Art at the 10th Saturn Awards, but lost to John Alvin's E.T.: The Extra-Terrestrial (1982) artwork. Riveria's poster art featured a demonic face descending on three trick-or-treaters. His artwork was later featured on the cover of Fangoria in October 1982. The stylized face on the theatrical poster is actually a distorted image of the witch mask which appears in the film. The image of the trick-or-treaters is similar to a shot in the movie that shows children in Phoenix, Arizona walking in silhouette with a red sunset in the background.

=== Merchandising ===
As part of a merchandising campaign, the producers requested Don Post to mass-produce the skull, witch, and jack-o'-lantern masks. Producers had given exclusive merchandising rights to Post as part of his contract for working on the film, and Post Studios had already successfully marketed tie-in masks for the classic Universal Monsters, Planet of the Apes (1968), Star Wars (1977), and E.T.: The Extra-Terrestrial (1982). Post used the original molds for the masks in the film to mass-produce masks for retail sale. He speculated, "Because the masks are so significant to the movie, they could become a cult item, with fans wanting to wear them when they go to see the movie." Post also gave mask-making demonstrations for a Universal Studio tour in Hollywood. The masks retailed for $25 when they finally appeared in stores. In October 2019, NECA announced that they would be releasing three 8" action figures of The Pumpkin, Witch, and Skull, which were released in March 2020.

=== Home media ===
Halloween III was released on VHS, Capacitance Electronic Disc, and LaserDisc in 1983 by MCA/Universal Home Video.

A DVD edition was first distributed by Goodtimes Entertainment in 1998. by Universal released a DVD edition in 2002, followed by a double-feature DVD paired with Halloween II in 2007.

The film was released on Blu-ray for the first time on September 18, 2012, from Shout! Factory, containing the same special features as their collector's edition DVD, including an audio commentary, documentary, trailers, and still galleries.

Anchor Bay Entertainment and Shout! Factory's subsidiary label, Scream Factory, once again released the film on Blu-ray on September 23, 2014, as a part of their 15-disc box set containing every film in the Halloween franchise, up to Rob Zombie's Halloween II (2009). Universal subsequently released a standard Blu-ray edition of the film on August 11, 2015.

A 4K UHD Blu-ray edition was released by Scream Factory on October 5, 2021, which was reissued in a steelbook edition available exclusively via Amazon on October 28, 2025.

=== Novelization ===
The script was adapted as a paperback novelization in 1982 by horror writer Dennis Etchison, who also wrote the novelization of Halloween II, writing under the pseudonym Jack Martin. The book was reissued in 1984. Although Cochran appears to die in the film, the novelization implies that he may have survived, with the magic of Stonehenge transporting him away. While the film leaves open the question of whether Challis was able to get the third network to pull the deadly Silver Shamrock ad, the book conclusively states that he failed as the children die screaming.

== Reception ==
=== Box office ===
Halloween III: Season of the Witch opened in 1,297 theaters in the United States on October 22, 1982, and earned $6,333,259 in its opening weekend. Like its predecessor, the film was distributed through Universal by Italian producer Dino De Laurentiis. It grossed a total of $14,400,000 in the United States, but was the worst performing Halloween film at the time with approximately 4,897,959 domestic tickets sold during its initial release. Several other horror films that premiered in 1982 performed far better, including Poltergeist ($76,606,280), Friday the 13th Part III ($34,581,519), and Creepshow ($21,028,755).

=== Critical response ===
On Rotten Tomatoes the film holds a 51% approval rating based on 49 reviews. The site's consensus reads, "Its laudable deviation from series formula not withstanding, Halloween III: Season of the Witch offers paltry thrills and dubious plotting." On Metacritic it has a score of 50 out of 100 based on reviews from 11 critics, indicating "mixed or average" reviews. Audiences polled by CinemaScore gave the film an average grade of "D" on an A+ to F scale, the lowest of the franchise.

==== Contemporary ====
Halloween III: Season of the Witch received generally negative reviews from film critics and was unpopular with audiences at the time of its release. The New York Times reviewer Vincent Canby struggled to apply a definite label to the film's content. He remarks, "Halloween III manages the not easy feat of being anti-children, anti-capitalism, anti-television and anti-Irish all at the same time." On the other hand, he says that the film "is probably as good as any cheerful ghoul could ask for." Other critics were far more decisive in their assessments. Roger Ebert of the Chicago Sun-Times wrote that the film was "a low-rent thriller from the first frame. This is one of those Identikit movies, assembled out of familiar parts from other, better movies." However, he did praise Stacey Nelkin's performance. Cinefantastique magazine called the film a "hopelessly jumbled mess". Jason Paul Collum points to the absence of Michael Myers and the film's nihilistic ending as reasons why the film dissatisfied reviewers and audiences alike. Jim Harper called Wallace's plot "deeply flawed." Harper argues, "Any plot dependent on stealing a chunk of Stonehenge and shipping it secretly across the Atlantic is going to be shaky from the start." He noted, "there are four time zones across the United States, so the western seaboard has four hours to get the fatal curse-inducing advertisement off the air. Not a great plan." Harper was not the only critic unimpressed by the plot. Roger Ebert wrote, "What's [Cochran's] plan? Kill the kids and replace them with robots? Why?"

Ernest Leogrande of the New York Daily News awarded the film a one-star rating, writing: "Halloween III comes across as somebody's practical joke... a blatant borrowing from the spirit of Invasion of the Body Snatchers and The Thing but without their style or suspense and a climactic rescue scene like an old C-movie serial." The Philadelphia Inquirer's Steven Rea panned the film as "movie-making at its worst: The dialogue is flat, the story is downright dumb and the chills are few and far between." John Engstrom of The Boston Globe similarly found the film "undistinguished" and "not scary in the least," though he did commend its musical score and special effects.

==== Retrospective ====
A critical reevaluation has taken place which considers the film either on its own terms rather than part of the franchise. It now has a strong cult following. As observed by Chance Solem-Pfeifer: "If you changed the title and said this was a dark-hearted druid slasher movie made by a guy (writer-director Tommy Lee Wallace) who worshiped John Carpenter, it wouldn’t have taken 30 years to reclaim."

Tom Milne of Time Out offered a positive review in 1993, calling the title "a bit of a cheat, since the indestructible psycho of the first two films plays no part here." Unlike other critics, Milne thought the new plot was refreshing: "With the possibilities of the characters [of the previous Halloween films] well and truly exhausted, Season of the Witch turns more profitably to a marvellously ingenious Nigel Kneale tale of a toymaker and his fiendish plan to restore Halloween to its witch cult origins." Although Milne was unhappy that Kneale's original script was reduced to "a bit of a mess", he still believed the result was "hugely enjoyable".

PopMatters journalist J. C. Maçek III wrote that the film "features no serial killers or slashers of any kind ... Still, this could have been somewhat interesting, or at least not condemnable, had the film been any good. It's not. Almost every time it starts to get to the point where we might actually become engrossed in the film, director Tommy Lee Wallace throws in something corny like ... oh, like a human decapitation scene that shows just how much the producers invested in latex. Seriously, could the special effects look a little more fake, please? I was just getting to the point where I could almost tell the robots from the real people ... making a real person look faker than Michael Jackson's nose blissfully confuses me all over again."

=== Accolades ===
Award/association	Year	Category	Recipient(s) and nominee(s)	Result	Ref.
Saturn Awards	1983	Best Poster Art	Edd Riveria	Nominated	
Saturn Awards	2015	Best DVD or Blu-ray Collection		Won (Note: As part of the Halloween: The Complete Collection Blu-ray box set by Shout! Factory.)	

== Legacy ==
The films Livide, The Guest, Halloween (2018), and Halloween Kills all include the masks from Halloween III as easter eggs. Livide also briefly features the Silver Shamrock jingle.

The film's score also influenced later works. Director Adam Wingard cited the score of Halloween III as one of the principal musical influences on The Guest (2014), alongside Brad Fiedel's score for The Terminator. Wingard said that the filmmakers sought to give The Guest a similar musical "vibe," with composer Steve Moore using vintage synthesizer equipment.

The German speed metal group Helloween, which used Halloween-themed imagery, adapted the "Silver Shamrock" ditty from the film, using it as an introduction to the song "Starlight" from their 1985 debut full-length studio album Walls of Jericho.

Music and culture website The Alternative lists the film in their "The Alt's Favorite Horror Films list."

== See also ==
- List of films set around Halloween

== Sources ==
- Byrne, Wayne (2025). You Can't Kill the Boogeyman: The Ongoing Halloween Saga—13 Movies and Counting. New York City, New York: Bloomsbury Publishing. ISBN 978-1-493-07979-7.
- Collum, Jason Paul (2004). Assault of the Killer B's: Interviews with 20 Cult Film Actresses. Jefferson, North Carolina: McFarland & Company. ISBN 978-0-7864-8041-8.
- Erickson, Hal (2012). Military Comedy Films: A Critical Survey and Filmography of Hollywood Releases Since 1918. Jefferson, North Carolina: McFarland & Company. ISBN 978-0-7864-9267-1.
- Gonzalez, Victor (2024). "The Viral Power of Halloween III". In Seçmen, Emre Ahmet (ed.). Studies on Cinematography and Narrative in Film: Sequels, Serials, and Trilogies. Hershey, Pennsylvania: IGI Global. pp. 285–324. ISBN 979-8-369-31959-8.
- Hanke, Ken (2013). A Critical Guide to Horror Film Series. New York City, New York: Routledge. ISBN 978-1-317-92882-9.
- Harper, Jim (2004). Legacy of Blood: A Comprehensive Guide to Slasher Movies. Manchester, England: Critical Vision. ISBN 978-1-900-48639-2.
- Harris, Martin (Fall 2004). "You Can't Kill the Boogeyman: Halloween III and the Modern Horror Franchise". Journal of Popular Film and Television. 32 (3). doi:10.3200/JPFT.32.3.98-120.
- Maxford, Howard (1996). The A–Z of Horror Films. London, England: Batsford Books. ISBN 978-0-7134-7973-7.
- Meyers, Richard (1984). S-F 2: A Pictorial History of Science Fiction From Rollerball to Return of the Jedi. New York City, New York: Citadel Press. ISBN 978-0-806-50875-7.
- Milne, Tom (1993). The Time Out Film Guide (Third ed.). London, England: Penguin Books. ISBN 978-0-140-17513-4.
- Muir, John Kenneth (2012). Horror Films of the 1980s. Jefferson, North Carolina: McFarland & Company. ISBN 978-0-7864-5501-0.
- Paul, Louis (2007). Tales from the Cult Film Trenches. Jefferson, North Carolina: McFarland & Company. ISBN 978-0-7864-8402-7.
- Rogers, Nicholas (2002). Halloween: From Pagan Ritual to Party Night. Oxford, England: Oxford University Press. ISBN 978-0-195-16896-9.
- Weaver, Tom (2002). Science Fiction Confidential: Interviews with 23 Monster Stars and Filmmakers. Jefferson, North Carolina: McFarland & Company. ISBN 978-0-786-41175-7.
- Williams, Tony (1996). Hearths of Darkness: The Family in the American Horror Film. Madison, New Jersey: Fairleigh Dickinson University Press. ISBN 978-0-838-63564-3.
- Willis, Donald C. (1984). Horror and Science Fiction Films III. Lanham, Maryland: Scarecrow Press. ISBN 978-0-8108-1723-4.
