= They Live (soundtrack) =

Film score by John Carpenter and Alan Howarth
- Released: 1988
- Studio: Electric Melody Studios, Glendale, California
- Genre: Electronic; blues; film score
- Length: 31:12
- Label: Enigma Records
- Producer: John Carpenter, Alan Howarth

John Carpenter chronology
Prince of Darkness (1987)	They Live (1988)	Christine (1989)

Alan Howarth chronology
Halloween 4: The Return of Michael Myers (1988)	They Live (1988)	Christine (1989)

Alternative cover
- 20th Anniversary Edition

They Live is a soundtrack by John Carpenter and Alan Howarth for the film of the same name. It was released in 1988 through Enigma Records. An expanded 20th Anniversary Edition was released in 2008 through Alan Howarth Incorporated.

== Track listing ==
All music is composed by John Carpenter & Alan Howarth.

No.	Title	Length
1.	"Coming to L.A."	4:01
2.	"A Message"	2:36
3.	"The Siege of Justiceville"	5:37
4.	"Return to Church"	1:27
5.	"All Out of Bubble Gum"	2:38
6.	"Back to the Street"	2:25
7.	"Kidnapped"	3:28
8.	"Transient Hotel"	2:14
9.	"Underground"	3:22
10.	"Wake Up"	3:24
Total length:		31:12

20th Anniversary Edition
No.	Title	Length
1.	"TV Broadcast"	1:49
2.	"Coming to L.A."	4:02
3.	"A Message"	2:39
4.	"The Siege of Justiceville"	5:40
5.	"Return to Church"	1:26
6.	"All Out of Bubble Gum"	2:40
7.	"Back to the Street"	2:24
8.	"Kidnapped"	3:31
9.	"Transient Hotel"	2:17
10.	"Underground"	3:22
11.	"Wake Up"	3:26
12.	"Chew Bubble Gum and Kick Ass"	0:19
13.	"Sunglasses On"	2:49
14.	"Back Alley"	2:39
15.	"Transport"	2:18
16.	"Tunnel"	2:06
17.	"Holly's Hill"	2:41
18.	"Roll Away"	1:18
19.	"Get Me Out"	1:52
20.	"Portal"	1:39
21.	"Out the Window / L.A. Blues"	2:49
22.	"All Out of Bubblegum" (Film Version)	3:35
23.	"TV Signal"	3:20
24.	"Underground" (Film Version)	7:06
25.	"Commercial Break"	0:45
26.	"Car Commercial"	0:22
27.	"Press on Nails"	0:49
28.	"The Cheese Dip"	0:35
29.	"They Live Main Theme"	3:33
Total length:		73:51

== Personnel ==
- John Carpenter – composition, performance, production
- Alan Howarth - composition, performance, synthesizer programming, sequencing, editing, recording, production

== Reception ==
Carpenter's score was nominated at the 16th Saturn Awards for "Best Music".
