= Tawny Moyer =

American actress

- Born: March 30, 1957 (age 68); San Diego, California, U.S.
- Occupation: Actress
- Years active: 1978–2001
- Spouse: Patrick St. Esprit

Tawny Moyer (born March 30, 1957) is a former American actress. She is best known for her role as nurse Jill Franco in the horror film Halloween II (1981).

Moyer also appeared in films such as California Suite (1978), Looker (1981), A Fine Mess (1986), and Thank Heaven (2001). She has made guest appearances on television shows, including Barnaby Jones, Hunter, The A-Team, Knight Rider, The Nanny, and The Drew Carey Show. She is also the main character in the hair metal band W.A.S.P. music video, "L.O.V.E. Machine."

== Filmography ==
=== Film ===
Year	Title	Role	Notes
1978	California Suite	Stewardess	
1981	Halloween II	Nurse Jill Franco	
1981	Looker	Warrior Housewife	
1984	Terror in the Aisles	Nurse Jill Franco	Documentary; Archive footage
1986	A Fine Mess	Leading Lady	
1987	House of the Rising Sun	Corey	
1992	Noises Off	—	ADR loop group
1993	Son in Law	—	ADR group
1994	Iron Will	—	ADR loop group
1994	Attack of the 5 Ft. 2 Women	Voice	
1995	While You Were Sleeping	—	ADR voice
2001	Thank Heaven	Reporter #2	

=== Television ===
Year	Title	Role	Notes
1979	Barnaby Jones	Lynette Atkinson	Episode: "Fatal Overture"
1983	Just Our Luck	—	Episode: "Ballad of Dead Eye Dick"
1984	Hunter	Cathy O'Neil	Episode: "Hunter"
1984	Hardcastle and McCormick	Leonore, Waitress	Episode: "Whatever Happened to Guts?"
1984	The A-Team	Patty	Episode: "Breakout!"
1985	Knight Rider	Allie Raymond	Episode: "Knight & Knerd"
1986	The Paper Chase	—	Episode: "A Wounded Hart"
1998	The Nanny	Nurse	Episode: "Mom's the Word"
1998	Sports Night	Libby	Episode: "The Quality of Mercy at 29K"
2000	The Drew Carey Show	The Realtor	Episode: "The Gang Stops Drinking"
