= John Zenda =

American film and television actor (1944–1994)

- Zenda in Halloween II, 1981
- Born: John Louis Zendejas; July 21, 1944; Dunsmuir, California, U.S.
- Died: August 3, 1994 (aged 50); Los Angeles, California, U.S.
- Occupations: Film and television actor
- Years active: 1976–1990

John Louis Zendejas (July 21, 1944 – August 3, 1994) was an American film and television actor. Born in Dunsmuir, California. He was best known for playing Marshal Terrence Gummell, who was murdered by Michael Myers in the 1981 horror film Halloween II, the sequel of the 1978 film Halloween. His other well-known role was as Supervisor Wagner in the 1983 hit drama film Bad Boys, starring Sean Penn, Reni Santoni, Jim Moody and Esai Morales. His final film was the 1990 film Catchfire, appearing as a trucker.

Zenda served in the United States Air Force during the Vietnam War. He made guest appearances on a number of television shows including Wonder Woman, The Bionic Woman, The Incredible Hulk, and Falcon Crest. He died of pancreatic cancer on August 3, 1994 in Los Angeles, California, at the age of 50. He was buried at Riverside National Cemetery.

== Filmography ==
Year	Title	Role	Notes
1977	The Bionic Woman	Weber	S2:E29&30 "Deadly Ringer"
1977	The 3,000 Mile Chase	Inspector	TV movie
1978	Love Is Not Enough		TV movie
1978	Every Girl Should Have One	Wrestler	
1978	Hawaii Five-O	Walter Sherman	Episode: "Deadly Courier"
1978	Paradise Alley	Detective	
1978	Battlestar Galactica	Sleeping Crewman	Uncredited
1979	Burnout	John	
1980	Inside Moves	Hospital Personnel	
1981	Halloween II	Marshal Terrence Gummell	
1983	Bad Boys	Wagner	
1988	Colors	Officer Rutley	
1988	The Perfect Victims	Large Man	
1990	Catchfire	Trucker	(final film role)
