= Santa Mira =

Santa Mira may refer to:

== Fictional places ==
Santa Mira, California, is the name of a fictional town in the following science fiction or horror works:

- The Body Snatchers, a 1955 novel
  - Invasion of the Body Snatchers, a 1956 film based on this novel
- Halloween III: Season of the Witch, a 1982 film
- Phantoms (novel), a 1983 novel
- Airwolf, a 1984–1987 TV series
- Memoirs of an Invisible Man (film), a 1992 film
- A Friend to Die For, or Death of a Cheerleader, a 1994 Lifetime TV movie
- The Dark Tower VII: The Dark Tower, a 2004 novel
- Ben 10: Alien Force, a 2008 TV series. Season 1, episode 06, "Max Out"
- Scream of the Banshee, a 2011 TV movie
- Femme Fatales, a 2011–2012 TV series
- Sharknado 2: The Second One, a 2014 TV movie, used as name of airline
- Sharknado 3: Oh Hell No!, a 2015 TV movie, used as name of gas station
- Sharknado: The 4th Awakens, a 2016 TV movie, used as license plate on Uber car
- The Last Sharknado: It's About Time, a 2018 TV movie, as a fictional Wild West town and train line
- The Edge of Sleep, a 2019 horror-mystery podcast starring Markiplier
- The Edge of Sleep (TV Series), a 2024 horror-mystery TV series also starring Markiplier which is based on the 2019 podcast of the same name

== Other uses ==
- Nepenthes 'Santa Mira', a cultivar of the carnivorous plant genus Nepenthes
- "Santa Mira" is an MDR file name in season 2 of the AppleTV+ series Severance.
