= Richard Delmer Boyer =

American convicted of murder on death row

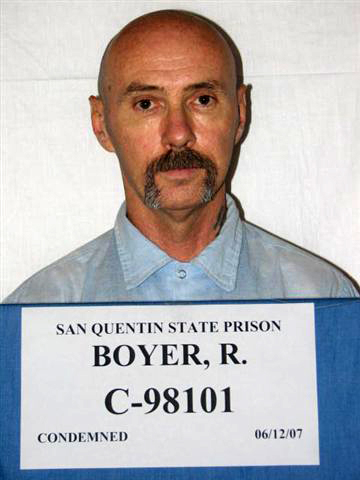
- Born: 1958 (age 67–68)
- Convictions: First degree murder with special circumstances (2 counts); Robbery (2 counts)
- Penalty: Death

Details
- Victims: 3
- Span of crimes: 1980–1982
- Country: United States
- State: California
- Location: Fullerton
- Weapon: Knife

Richard Delmer Boyer (born 1958) is an American serial killer convicted of the 1982 murder of elderly couple Francis and Aileen Harbitz. He was also responsible for the murder of John Compton in 1980.

== Background ==
Boyer, from La Mirada, California, was at his home abusing PCP as well as abusing alcohol while watching the 1981 movie Halloween II. He claimed the film's opening murders were the reason for his crimes.

== Crime and arrest ==
On December 7, 1982, Boyer stabbed an elderly couple to death in Fullerton, California; he stabbed the husband 24 times and the wife 19 times. The victims were 67-year-old Francis Harbitz and 68-year-old Aileen Harbitz. Boyer was arrested following a tip-off from the victim's son. He was about to be released by the police when he confessed to the crime.

== Trial ==
During the trial, Boyer was revealed to be a drug addict. He had consumed both alcohol and drugs on the day of the murder. He stated that he had driven to the victim's house to borrow money. At the property, he stated he started "freaking out" and could not remember committing the crime. The first trial ended in a hung jury. In the second trial, in 1984, a defense psychopharmacologist testified that Boyer had suffered a drug-induced flashback to a horror film, Halloween II, which features a scene with an elderly couple. The film was shown to the jury, the first time in US legal history that a commercial motion picture had been submitted as evidence at a murder trial. The jury found him guilty, and the judge sentenced Boyer to death.

The California Supreme Court ordered a retrial in 1989, stating that Boyer had been denied his Miranda rights.

In 1991, Boyer was linked to another murder, that of 75-year-old John Houston Compton in 1980, but the District Attorney stated they would not pursue the case if it distracted from the forthcoming retrial. However, the California Supreme Court found sufficient evidence to conclude that Boyer was responsible for the murder, which was mentioned at the sentencing phase of his trial.

In 1992, Boyer was retried, and he was again found guilty and sentenced to death.

== See also ==
- List of death row inmates in the United States § California
- List of serial killers in the United States
- Capital punishment in California

== Bibliography ==
- David J. Skal (2003). Death Makes a Holiday: A Cultural History of Halloween. Bloomsbury. ISBN 1-58234-305-5.
