= Don Post =

American mask maker and prop fabricator (1902–1979)

Don Post Sr.
- Born: Donald Post Sr. March 14, 1902; Connecticut, U.S.
- Died: November 17, 1979 (aged 77); Encino, Los Angeles, U.S.
- Occupations: Mask maker, prop fabricator

Donald Post Sr. (March 14, 1902 – November 17, 1979) was an American mask maker and prop fabricator. In 1938, he founded the Halloween mask company Don Post Studios, creating the first commercially sold full over-the-head latex rubber masks.

== Career ==
Born in 1902, Post founded Don Post Studios in 1938 in Chicago, Illinois, initially producing masks for films and stage productions, as well as simple face masks. The Studio later moved to California. In 1963, the studio became an official licensee of Universal Studios for a new line of Universal Monsters Characters masks, the "Universal Horrors". In 1965, Post released a deluxe version of the line, with more lifelike faces by man sculpture Pat Newman, and hand-laid hair instead of the previously used sculpted hair. The 1965 creations were dubbed the "Calendar Masks" after the 1966 Monster Calendar on which they appeared. This increased the studio's popularity.

Their mask of actor and wrestler Tor Johnson became their best-selling mask of all time, starting in 1966 and ending in 1994.

In 1967, the Studio (including master make-up artist John Chambers) sculpted a 7'5" King Kong statue, that was the biggest monster statue made for a Wax Museum. The finished latex armature casting was then purchased by the Hollywood Wax Museum in Niagara Falls, where it remains to this day.

In 1978, the studio released a Star Wars mask line, made of heavy vinyl.

Earlier in 1975, Don Post Studios released a Star Trek line, consisting of Captain Kirk and Spock masks derived from the actors' life casts, as well as ones representing a mugato, a Gorn and the salt vampire. The Kirk mask, was purchased and modified for the mask of the murderer Michael Myers in the 1978 slasher film Halloween. In 1982, the studio created masks for the third Halloween film, Halloween III: Season of the Witch.

== Legacy ==
After Don Post's passing in 1979, the company was taken over by his son, Don Post Jr. From the early 2000s to 2012, the company was property of its parent company Paper Magic Group. In 2012, after 73 years in business, it was announced that the company would be shut down. The liquidation auction included most of the company's molds and foam masters. In 2023, the company was acquired by Trick or Treat Studios.

Today, Don Post Studios creations are highly sought after by collectors. Post inspired many make-up artists, costume designers, and mask makers.
