= Dick Warlock =

American actor and stuntman (born 1940)

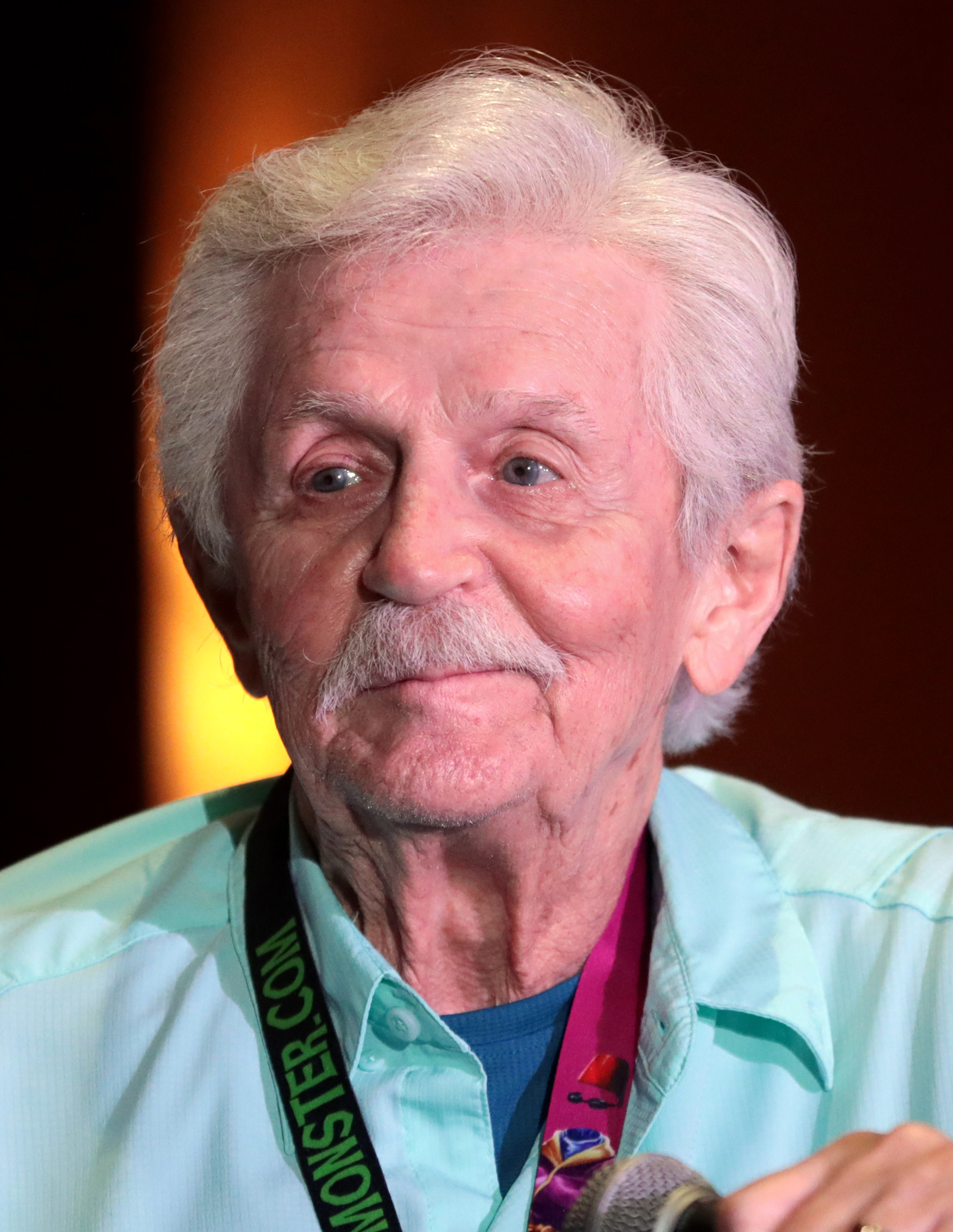
- Warlock in 2023
- Born: Richard Anthony Leming; February 5, 1940 (age 86); Cincinnati, Ohio, U.S.
- Other names: Richard Warlock; Dick Leming
- Occupations: Actor; stuntman
- Years active: 1960–2002
- Children: 3, including Billy
- Website: dickwarlock.com

Richard Anthony Warlock (né Leming; born February 5, 1940) is an American actor and stuntman.

== Career ==
Warlock is known for playing Michael Myers in Halloween II. He also played the android assassin in Halloween III: Season of the Witch and he was Kurt Russell's personal stunt double for over 25 years, also collaborating with such directors as Steven Spielberg and John Carpenter. Warlock was active from 1960 until his retirement in 2002. Warlock lives in Kingsport, Tennessee. He has two sons, Billy Warlock and Lance Warlock, and one daughter, Rhonda.

== Filmography ==
Title	Year	Notes	Role
Spider-Man	2002		Man on roof (uncredited)
Raven Hawk	1996 (TV)		Dale Rice
Casino	1995		Security Guard (with cattle prod) & Stunt Coordinator
Dreamrider	1993		Drunk
Unlawful Entry	1992		Stunts
Guncrazy	1992		Sheriff
Beastmaster 2: Through the Portal of Time	1991		Scientist #1, stunts
The Rocketeer	1991	Credited as Richard Warlock	FBI Agent
Child's Play 3	1991	Stunt Coordinator & Stunts	
Child's Play 2	1990	Stunt Coordinator	
Delta Force 2: The Colombian Connection	1990	Credited as Richard Warlock	DEA Agent in Van & NDstunts
Spontaneous Combustion	1990	Credited as Richard Warlock	Mr. Fitzpatrick (Gate Guard)
The Abyss	1989	Credited as Richard Warlock	Dwight Perry & Stunt Coordinator
Pumpkinhead	1988	Credited as Richard Warlock	Clayton Heller & Stunt Coordinator
Omega Syndrome	1987		Marshall #1
Rags to Riches	1987	TV series	Man in Bar fight
Remote Control	1987	Credited as Richard Warlock	Mr. James
Spaceballs	1987	Stunt Coordinator	Vulcan Pinch Guard (uncredited)
The Running Man	1987	Stunts – uncredited	
Convicted	1986 (TV)	Credited as Richard Warlock	
Quicksilver	1986	Credited as Richard Warlock	Cab Driver
Rags to Riches	1986 (TV)		Man in Bar
Big Trouble in Little China	1986	Stunts Credited as Richard Warlock	
Commando	1985	Stunts Credited as Richard Warlock	
Friday the 13th Part V: A New Beginning	1985		Stunt Coordinator
Firestarter	1984	Credited as Richard Warlock	Ray Knowles
Magnum, P.I.	1984	TV series	Jimmy Kiedash
Body Double	1984	Credited as Richard Warlock	Stunts
The Master	1984	TV series	Terrorist Waiter
The Thing	1982		Stunt coordinator
Halloween III: Season of the Witch	1982		Assassin Android & Stunt coordinator
Halloween II	1981		Michael Myers / Patrolman #3 Stunt Coordinator
Escape from New York	1981		Stunt coordinator
Used Cars	1980	Stunts Credited as Richard Warlock	
The Stunt Man	1980	Stunts	
The Nude Bomb	1980	uncredited	Kaos man on plane (Your boot's ringing)
1941	1979	stunts – uncredited	
Herbie Goes to Monte Carlo	1977	Credited as Richard Warlock	Driver Stunt Coordinator
McNaughton's Daughter	1976 (TV)	Credited as Richard Warlock	Nick Fleming
Jaws	1975	stunts – uncredited	
Mr. Majestyk	1974	stunts – uncredited	
Earthquake	1974	uncredited	Diver at Hollywood Reservoir
Dirty Mary, Crazy Larry	1974		Trooper #7
Blazing Saddles	1974	stunts – uncredited	
Soylent Green	1973	stunts – uncredited	
The Love Bug	1968	Credited as Richard Warlock	Driver ND Stunts
The Green Berets	1968	uncredited	
The Ballad of a Gunfighter	1964	Credited as Dick Leming	
