= Morningside Hospital (California) =

Geography
- Location: 8711 South Harvard Boulevard, Los Angeles, California, United States
- Coordinates: 33.959019°N 118.307978°W

Services
- Beds: 125

History
- Opened: 1958
- Closed: September 15, 1980
- Demolished: 2003

Links
- Lists: Hospitals in California

Morningside Hospital was a 125-bed hospital located at 8711 South Harvard Boulevard, Los Angeles, California. The facility opened in early 1958. An August 1980 Los Angeles Times article indicated that the closing date of Morningside would be September 15, 1980, citing financial losses and competition from larger hospitals. Its emergency room closed two weeks before the hospital itself.

Morningside was one of the filming locations for Halloween II (1981), Fast Times at Ridgemont High (1982), 10 to Midnight (1983) and V: The Final Battle (1984).

After its closure the hospital was abandoned and then demolished in 2003. That same year construction of the Harvard Yard Senior Apartments began on the former hospital site, with funding provided by the Los Angeles Housing Department.
