= Christine (1983 film) =

1983 American film by John Carpenter

- Theatrical release poster
- Directed by: John Carpenter
- Screenplay by: Bill Phillips
- Based on: Christine by Stephen King
- Produced by: Richard Kobritz; Larry J. Franco
- Starring: Keith Gordon; John Stockwell; Alexandra Paul; Robert Prosky; Harry Dean Stanton
- Cinematography: Donald M. Morgan
- Edited by: Marion Rothman
- Music by: John Carpenter; Alan Howarth
- Production companies: Polar Film Corporation; Columbia-Delphi Productions
- Distributed by: Columbia Pictures
- Release date: December 9, 1983
- Running time: 110 minutes
- Country: United States
- Language: English
- Budget: $10 million
- Box office: $21 million

Christine (titled onscreen as John Carpenter's Christine) is a 1983 American supernatural horror film co-scored and directed by John Carpenter, and adapted from Stephen King's 1983 novel. The film stars Keith Gordon as Arnie Cunningham, a bullied teenager who buys a sentient 1958 Plymouth Fury, named "Christine", that exhibits a toxic personality and becomes a bad influence on him. John Stockwell, Alexandra Paul, Robert Prosky and Harry Dean Stanton also star.

It was released in the United States on December 9, 1983, by Columbia Pictures. Christine received generally positive reviews from critics, and grossed $21 million at the box office.

== Plot ==
In 1957, on an automobile production line in Detroit, a newly-built red 1958 Plymouth Fury slams its hood shut by itself onto a worker's hand, while another worker is later found dead inside the car after having dropped cigar ash on its seats.

In 1978 Rockbridge, California, nerdy high school senior Arnold "Arnie" Cunningham is bullied on the first day of school by classmate Buddy Repperton and his gang. Arnie's only friend, Dennis Guilder, intervenes with help from a teacher, who sends Buddy and his gang to the principal's office. Buddy is expelled for possession of a switchblade.

After school, Arnie and Dennis see the same 1958 Fury—now in a dilapidated state—for sale at the home of George LeBay, the brother of the recently-deceased original owner, who tells them the car's name is Christine. In spite of Dennis' objections, Arnie purchases the car. Since Arnie's strict parents refuse to let him keep the car in their driveway, he begins to restore Christine at a local garage owned by the gruff Will Darnell, who offers Arnie a part-time job and access to parts he needs to repair Christine. Soon, Arnie develops a rebellious, arrogant personality, worrying his parents and Dennis.

Dennis confronts LeBay, who discloses that his late brother was also obsessed with Christine, his five-year-old niece choked to death in the car, and his sister-in-law and later his brother both committed suicide in it. At night, Dennis breaks into the garage to inspect Christine, but when Christine's radio begins playing 1950s rock and roll music, he flees.

Arnie begins a relationship with a new student, Leigh Cabot, who has rejected all her other admirers at school. While playing a football game, Dennis is stunned by the sight of Arnie and Leigh kissing in front of the now fully-restored Christine, causing him to sustain a severe injury that permanently ends his football career.

One night, when Arnie and Leigh are attending a drive-in theater, Leigh expresses jealousy over Christine. While alone in the car, Leigh nearly chokes to death on a hamburger, as Christine briefly locks her doors to keep Arnie from coming to her rescue. A nearby theater-goer performs the Heimlich maneuver on Leigh, saving her. Arnie drives Leigh home and she vows to never get into Christine again. Later that night, Buddy and his gang sneak into Darnell's garage and vandalize Christine. Arnie, enraged by the destruction, breaks up with Leigh and physically attacks his father following an argument about Christine's vandalism.

The next day, Arnie returns to the garage alone and witnesses Christine repairing herself. Over two evenings, the car kills Buddy and all his gang members, blowing up a gas station in the process. Christine drives away in flames and returns to the garage, where she crushes Darnell to death against the steering wheel. By morning, Christine is fully repaired when the police find Darnell's body. State Police detective Rudy Junkins questions Arnie about the death of Darnell, Buddy, and his gang members. However, the car's pristine condition and Arnie's alibi convince the detective he was not involved.

Leigh and Dennis conclude that Christine is responsible for Arnie's downward spiral. They plan to lure Christine to Darnell's garage and smash her with a bulldozer, but Christine surprises them by emerging from a pile of scrap metal. Leigh flees on foot while Dennis battles Christine with the bulldozer. Arnie is now driving Christine, and in an attempt to run Leigh down, Christine crashes into Darnell's office. Arnie is thrown through the windshield and impaled on a shard of glass. He reaches out to touch Christine's grille one last time, and Christine responds by playing "Pledging My Love" on her radio as Arnie dies.

Christine resumes her attack, until Dennis and Leigh corner her and flatten her with the bulldozer. The following day, Dennis, Leigh, and Junkins watch as the remains of Christine are crushed into a cube at a junkyard. Junkins congratulates the pair for stopping Christine, but they regret being unable to save Arnie. The sound of a 1950s rock and roll song spooks them briefly, but it proves to be coming from a boombox carried by a junkyard worker. Unseen by them, Christine's grille twitches slightly.

== Cast ==
- Keith Gordon as Arnold "Arnie" Cunningham
- John Stockwell as Dennis Guilder
- Alexandra Paul as Leigh Cabot
- Robert Prosky as Will Darnell
- Harry Dean Stanton as Detective Rudolph Junkins
- Christine Belford as Regina Cunningham
- Roberts Blossom as George LeBay
- William Ostrander as Clarence "Buddy" Repperton
- David Spielberg as Mr. Casey
- Malcolm Danare as Peter "Moochie" Welch
- Steven Tash as Richard "Ritchie" Trelawney
- Stuart Charno as Don Vandenberg
- Kelly Preston as Roseanne
- Mark Poppel as Chuck
- Robert Darnell as Michael Cunningham
- Bruce French as Mr. Smith
- Douglas Warhit as Bemis

== Production ==
=== Conception ===
Producer Richard Kobritz had previously produced the 1979 miniseries Salem's Lot, also based on a Stephen King novel. Through producing the miniseries, Kobritz became acquainted with King, who sent him manuscripts of two of his novels, Cujo, and Christine. Kobritz purchased the rights to Christine after finding himself attracted to the novel's "celebration of America's obsession with the motorcar."

Kobritz's first choice for director was John Carpenter, who was initially unavailable owing to two projects: an adaptation of another King novel, Firestarter, and an adaptation of the 1980 Eric Van Lustbader novel The Ninja. However, production delays on these projects allowed Carpenter to accept the director position for Christine. Kobritz and Carpenter had previously collaborated in the 1978 television film Someone's Watching Me!. Bill Phillips was Carpenter's choice for writer and was brought on shortly after Carpenter arrived. Carpenter was also joined by special effects supervisor Roy Arbogast, who had previously worked with Carpenter in The Thing (1982). According to Carpenter, Christine was not a film he had planned on directing, saying that he directed the film as "a job" as opposed to a "personal project." He had previously directed The Thing, which had done poorly at the box office and led to critical backlash. In retrospect, Carpenter stated that upon reading Christine, he felt that "It just wasn't very frightening. But it was something I needed to do at that time for my career."

King's novel, the source material for Carpenter's film, made it clear that the car was possessed by the evil spirit of its previous owner, Roland D. LeBay, whereas the film version of the story shows that the evil spirit of the car manifested itself on the day it was built. Other elements from the novel were altered for the film, particularly the execution of the death scenes, which the filmmakers opted for a more "cinematic approach."

=== Casting ===
Initially, Columbia Pictures had wanted to cast Brooke Shields in the role of Leigh because of her publicity after the release of The Blue Lagoon (1981), and Scott Baio as Arnie. The filmmakers declined the suggestion, opting to cast young actors who were still fairly unknown. Kevin Bacon auditioned for the role, but opted out when offered the lead in Footloose (1984). Carpenter cast Keith Gordon in the role of Arnie after an audition in New York City; Gordon had some experience in film, notably in Jaws 2, and was also working in theater at the time; John Stockwell was cast at an audition in Los Angeles.

Nineteen-year-old Alexandra Paul was cast in the film after an audition in New York City; according to Carpenter, Paul was an "untrained, young actress" at the time, but brought a "great quality" about the character of Leigh. According to Paul, she had not read any of King's books or seen Carpenter's films, and read the novel in preparation.

=== Filming ===
Christine was shot largely in Los Angeles, California, while the location for Darnell's garage was located in Santa Clarita. Filming began in April 1983, mere days after the King novel had been published. An abandoned furniture factory in Irwindale was used for the opening scene. The film's stunts were primarily completed by stunt coordinator Terry Leonard, who was behind the wheel of the car during the high-speed chase scenes, as well as the scene in which the car drives down a highway engulfed in flames. During that scene, Leonard wore a Nomex firefighter's suit complete with breathing apparatus.

Alexandra Paul's identical twin sister Caroline Paul wrote that she and her sister pulled a prank during filming, sending Caroline on set in place of Alexandra without telling Carpenter that they had made the switch until after he had shot a scene. She wrote, "My highly skilled clutch-pushing actually made it into the movie."

In 2023, John Carpenter said Christine "was a fun movie to make and easy — nothing tough about it."

=== The car ===
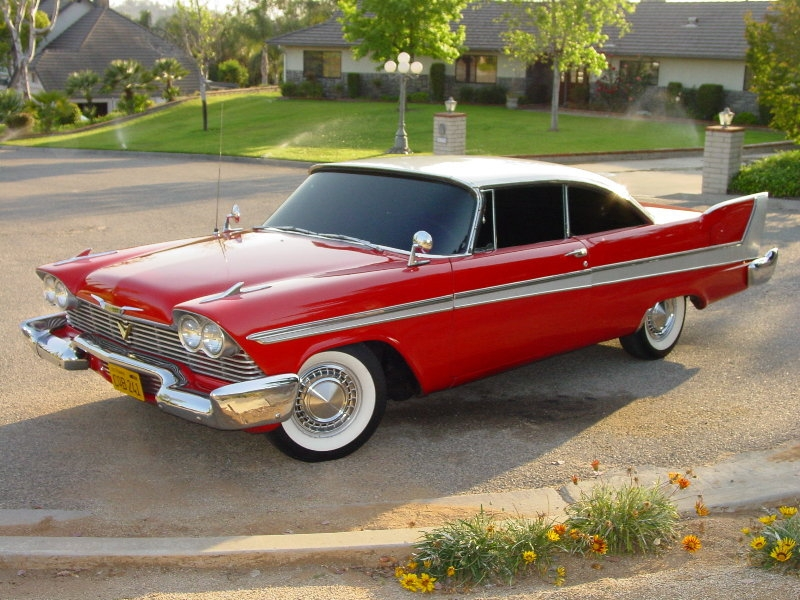
One of the two remaining models of Christine used in the film

Although the car in the film is identified as a 1958 Plymouth Fury – and in 1983 radio ads promoting the film, voiceover artists announced, "she's a '57 Fury" – two other Plymouth models, the Belvedere and the Savoy, were also used to portray the malevolent automobile onscreen. John Carpenter placed ads throughout Southern California searching for models of the car, and was able to purchase twenty-four of them in various states of disrepair, which were used to build a total of seventeen copies of the film car. All cars were two-door hardtops.

Total production for the 1958 Plymouth Fury was only 5,303, and they were difficult to find and expensive to buy at the time. In addition, the real-life Furys only came in one color, "Sandstone White" with a "Buckskin Beige" interior, seen on the other Furys on the assembly line during the initial scenes of the film, though the car in King's novel was ordered with a red-and-white custom paint job.

Originally, Carpenter had not planned to film the car's regeneration scenes, but gave special effects supervisor Roy Arbogast three weeks to devise a way for the car to rebuild itself. Arbogast and his team made rubber molds from one of the cars, including a whole front end. One of the cars was stripped of its engine to accommodate internally-mounted hydraulics that pulled the framework inward, crumpling the car, with the shot then run backwards in the final film. Twenty-three cars were used in the film. Initially sold as scrap metal after filming ended, one of the best known surviving vehicles was eventually rescued from the junkyard and restored. It was subsequently bought by collector Bill Gibson of Pensacola, Florida. One of the Christines was auctioned off at an auto-auction in Florida in January 2020.

== Release ==
=== Box office ===
Christine was released in North America on December 9, 1983, to 1,045 theaters. In its opening weekend Christine brought in $3,408,904 landing at #4. The film dropped 39.6% in its second weekend, grossing $2,058,517 slipping from fourth to eighth place. In its third weekend, it grossed $1,851,909 dropping to #9. The film remained at #9 its fourth weekend, grossing $2,736,782. In its fifth weekend, it returned to #8, grossing $2,015,922. Bringing in $1,316,835 in its sixth weekend, the film dropped out of the box office top ten to twelfth place. In its seventh and final weekend, the film brought in $819,972 landing at #14, bringing the total gross for Christine to $21,017,849.

=== Critical response ===
On the review aggregator website Rotten Tomatoes, Christine holds an approval rating of 69% based on 120 reviews. The website's critics consensus reads, "John Carpenter revs up Christine into a brisk thrill ride whose sharp direction, lively performances, and stylish flourishes make its absurd premise easy to forgive." Metacritic, which uses a weighted average, assigned the film a score of 57 out of 100, based on 10 critics, indicating "mixed or average" reviews.

Roger Ebert gave the film three out of four stars, saying: "By the end of the movie, Christine has developed such a formidable personality that we are actually taking sides during its duel with a bulldozer. This is the kind of movie where you walk out with a silly grin, get in your car, and lay rubber halfway down the Eisenhower." Janet Maslin of The New York Times gave the film a middling review, saying: "The early parts of the film are engaging and well acted, creating a believable high-school atmosphere. Unfortunately, the later part of the film is slow in developing, and it unfolds in predictable ways." Variety gave the film a negative review, stating: "Christine seems like a retread. This time it's a fire-engine red, 1958 Plymouth Fury that's possessed by the Devil, and this deja-vu premise [from the novel by Stephen King] combined with the crazed-vehicle format, makes Christine appear pretty shop worn." Time Out said of the film: "Carpenter and novelist Stephen King share not merely a taste for genre horror but a love of '50's teenage culture; and although set in the present, Christine reflects the second taste far more effectively than the first." The reviewer judged that only King's skillful writing could make the titular car scary, and that when translated to the screen it no longer had any presence.

=== King's reaction ===
While he was promoting the film Dreamcatcher in 2003, Stephen King mentioned Christine as one of two film adaptations of his work that had "bored" him (the other being The Shining).

=== Home media ===
The film was released on VHS by RCA/Columbia Pictures Home Video in 1984, and on DVD on August 4, 1998, and re-released on DVD in 2004. On March 12, 2013, Twilight Time video released the film on Blu-ray for the first time in a limited edition run numbered at 3,000 copies. On September 29, 2015, Sony Pictures Home Entertainment re-released the film on Blu-ray. The film was released on 4K UHD Blu-ray on September 11, 2018.

== Soundtrack ==
Two soundtracks were released, one consisting purely of the music written and composed by John Carpenter and Alan Howarth, the other consisting of the contemporary pop songs used in the film.

=== Score ===
Christine: Music from the Motion Picture

Film score by John Carpenter & Alan Howarth
- Released: June 1, 1990
- Genres: Electronic; film score
- Length: 33:14
- Label: Varèse Sarabande
- Producers: John Carpenter, Alan Howarth

John Carpenter & Alan Howarth chronology
| They Live (1988) | Christine: Music from the Motion Picture (1990) |

John Carpenter chronology
| They Live (1988) | Christine (1990) | Body Bags (1993) |

=== Songs appearing in film ===
The soundtrack album containing songs used in the film was entitled Christine: Original Motion Picture Soundtrack and was released on LP and cassette on Motown Records. It contained 10 (of the 15) songs listed in the film's credits, plus one track from John Carpenter and Alan Howarth's own score. The track listing was as follows:

1. George Thorogood and the Destroyers – "Bad to the Bone"
2. Buddy Holly & the Crickets – "Not Fade Away"
3. Johnny Ace – "Pledging My Love"
4. Robert & Johnny – "We Belong Together"
5. Little Richard – "Keep A-Knockin'"
6. Dion and The Belmonts – "I Wonder Why"
7. The Viscounts – "Harlem Nocturne"
8. Thurston Harris – "Little Bitty Pretty One"
9. Danny & The Juniors – "Rock 'n' Roll is Here to Stay"
10. John Carpenter & Alan Howarth – "Christine Attacks (Plymouth Fury)"
11. Larry Williams – "Bony Moronie"

The following tracks were not included on this LP release, but were used in the film and listed in the film's credits:

- ABBA – "The Name of the Game"
- Bonnie Raitt – "Runaway"
- Ritchie Valens – "Come on, Let's Go"
- Tanya Tucker – "Not Fade Away"
- The Rolling Stones – "Beast of Burden"

== Proposed remake ==
In June 2021, Sony Pictures Entertainment and Blumhouse Productions announced the development of a remake of the film with Bryan Fuller set to write and direct the film and Jason Blum, Vincenzo Natali and Steve Hoban producing. As of September 2026, no aspect of the project has moved forward.

== Cultural references ==
The 2004 film Taarzan: The Wonder Car by Bollywood filmmaking duo Abbas–Mustan is loosely based on Christine.

Taxiwaala, a 2018 Indian Telugu-language film, has a similar premise.

The film is referred to in the 2022 song "Autopilot" by August Ponthier.

David Gordon Green said his 2022 film Halloween Ends is a love letter to Christine and John Carpenter's body of work in general, though after watching the film, Carpenter said he did not notice any similarity to Christine.

== See also ==
- You Drive
- The Car (1977 film)
- Alice (Star Trek: Voyager)
- The Honking
- List of films about automobiles
- List of American films of 1983

== Bibliography ==
- Benjaminson, James (1994). Plymouth, 1946–1959. Motorbooks International. ISBN 978-0-87938-840-9.
- Von Doviak, Scott (2014). Stephen King Films FAQ: All That's Left to Know About the King of Horror on Film. Applause Theatre & Cinema. ISBN 978-1-48035-551-4.
- Kerr, Joe; Wollen, Peter (2004). Autopia: Cars and Culture. University of Chicago Press. ISBN 978-1-86189-132-7.
