= Head Office =

1985 film by Ken Finkleman

- Theatrical release poster
- Directed by: Ken Finkleman
- Written by: Ken Finkleman
- Produced by: Debra Hill
- Starring: Judge Reinhold; Lori-Nan Engler; Eddie Albert; Richard Masur; Rick Moranis; Don Novello; Jane Seymour; Wallace Shawn; Danny DeVito
- Cinematography: Gerald Hirschfeld
- Edited by: Danford B. Greene; Robert Lederman
- Music by: James Newton Howard; Alan Howarth
- Production companies: HBO Pictures; Silver Screen Partners
- Distributed by: Tri-Star Pictures
- Release date: December 29, 1985
- Running time: 90 minutes
- Country: United States
- Language: English
- Budget: $9–12 million
- Box office: $3.3 million

Head Office is a 1985 American satirical black comedy film, produced by HBO Pictures in association with Silver Screen Partners. It stars Judge Reinhold, Eddie Albert, Lori-Nan Engler, Jane Seymour, Richard Masur, Michael O'Donoghue, Ron Frazier, and Merritt Butrick and was directed and written by Ken Finkleman. It is also the second film to be composed by James Newton Howard.

The film is primarily set in Chicago, in the offices of a large corporation. A recent business school graduate is hired, despite his lack of experience and skill. His new mentors provide him with lessons on cheating and blackmail, while his female supervisor teaches him that one can use seduction to get promoted. The young man temporarily earns the favor of the CEO (who wants to close a deal with the boy's father), but he is more interested in courting the CEO's daughter. The young man earns a reputation for honesty by leaking information about the company's actual motivations to the press. The CEO has the idea to use the young man in a political bribery scheme, but the plot backfires. The CEO is forced to resign, in favor of his daughter and his prospective son-in-law.

== Plot ==
Jack Issel Jr. is a natural-born slacker who has just graduated from business school and joined I.N.C., a large American corporation based in Chicago. On his trip up the corporate ladder, he sees the dirty underside of the corporate world and how it corrupts people. His two mentors, the stuffy and buttoned up chief financial officer Scott Dantley and the chief operating officer Bob Nixon show him first-hand how to cheat and blackmail one's way to the top. Jack is further aided by his personnel officer Max Landsberger who tells Jack that money and power come before people in the corporate world. Jack's supervisor and the public relations vice president, Jane Caldwell, also tells Jack exactly the same thing as Jack learns that Jane is a shady vixen who is hell-bent on sleeping her way to the top by seducing every man she meets to get ahead in what she sees as a man's world.

Unsure of his abilities, and often incompetent, Jack can't figure out why he keeps getting promoted. Could it have something to do with his father being an influential (but corrupt) Senator?

Jack meets and falls in love with a young woman named Rachael, who turns out to be the radical, left-wing daughter of the ruthless chairman of the board and CEO, Pete Helmes, who is revealed to be promoting Jack so he can gain Jack's father, Senator Jack Issel Sr.'s support to close down a textile plant in a small upstate town called Allenville, and move it into the Latin American country of San Marcos for company self-interest..

Within a week of his employment, the further promoted Jack, with Max in tow, travel upstate to the town of Allenville to give a press conference on the closing of the textile plant where Rachael has organised a huge protest of thousands of workers and townspeople protesting the closing of the plant. The mob of townspeople attack and destroy Jack and Max's limousine, much to the chagrin of the company limo driver, Sal. At the same time, to impress Rachael, rather than tell a fabricated public relations story about the closing of the plant, Jack tells the truth to the reporters about I.N.C.'s motivations, which are entirely of self-interest, while both the enraged Helmes and Senator Issel watch the event on their TV sets. This does win over Rachael's affections and that night, she and Jack spend the night together.

The following morning, while Helmes decides to fire Jack, he sees that Jack's actions have drawn nationwide media attention whom hail him as an honest businessman. Helmes changes his mind about firing Jack and invites him to his house that weekend, where Jack runs into Rachael again. Helmes tries to win over Jack's loyalty to I.N.C. by inviting him to a dinner reception at the council offices of the fictitious Latin American country of San Marcos, where Jack is expected to give a $2 million bribe to a political rival of the San Marcos dictator General Sepulveda as another I.N.C. ploy to win the support of the dictatorship government for further business purposes.

At the reception, Jack sneaks Rachael into the building where they finally learn the truth about Helmes' plans for Jack, as well as his plans for I.N.C.'s business with the country of San Marcos. Stealing the suitcase with the $2 million cash-bribe money, Jack and Rachael flee from the building security forces in a climatic chase and escape from the building and expose I.N.C.'s plans to the press. As a result, the textile plant in Allenville is saved, Helmes is forced to resign from I.N.C. in disgrace, and Jack and Rachael both inherit the majority of I.N.C.'s stockholder shares.

The final scene has Jack, now the new chairman of the board at I.N.C., travelling in Helmes' helicopter, to the offices with Sal as his pilot.

== Cast ==
- Judge Reinhold as Jack Issel Jr.
- Lori-Nan Engler as Rachael Helmes
- Eddie Albert as Pete Helmes
- Richard Masur as Max Landsberger
- Merritt Butrick as John Hudson
- Jane Seymour as Jane Caldwell
- Rick Moranis as Howard Gross
- Danny DeVito as Frank Stedman
- Michael O'Donoghue as Scott Dantley
- Don King as INC executive
- John Kapelos as General Sepulveda
- Wallace Shawn as Mike Hoover
- Don Novello as Sal
- Brian Doyle-Murray as Colonel Tolliver
- George Coe as Senator Jack Issel Sr.
- Anne Lockhart as Secretary

== Location ==
The film was largely filmed in Toronto, Ontario, part of a growing trend in the late 1970s and throughout the 1980s of making American films there. Scenes were also filmed in nearby Oshawa, Ontario at the Parkwood Mansion, which doubled as the mansion residence of Pete Helmes.

== Reception ==
=== Critical response ===
Janet Maslin of The New York Times wrote in her review: "Head Office, which opened yesterday at the UA Twin and other theaters, has a droll tone that sets it well above comedy's lowest common denominator. But it also has a bloodlessness that keeps it from being funny very often. Ken Finkleman, the film's writer and director, has assembled an interesting cast and struck a note that might have been timely; though corporate satire has been out of vogue for a while, it's ready for a revival. But while Head Office has its moments, it winds up much too understated to have a cutting edge."

Reinhold later said the film had "a good script, but things didn't work out at the old box office." On Rotten Tomatoes, the film has a score of 0% based on 6 critic reviews.

=== Release ===
Head Office was released in theatres on December 29, 1985. The film was released on DVD on April 6, 2010, by HBO Home Entertainment. HBO re-released Head Office on DVD on April 2, 2012.
