= Alan Howarth (composer) =

American composer and sound designer

Alan Howarth is an American composer and sound designer who has worked on soundtracks for Hollywood films including the Star Trek and Halloween series, and is known for his collaborations with film director and composer John Carpenter.

== Childhood and early career ==
Alan Howarth grew up in Cleveland, Ohio. Playing music in local rock bands, he opened for national touring acts including The Who and Cream. He then began to create original music in bands Braino and Pi Corp, using synthesizers. From 1976 he provided synthesizer support for fusion jazz band Weather Report, which relocated him to Los Angeles. Howarth caught his big break in 1980 when his music was used for a Star Trek movie trailer, after which he worked on the next five Star Trek films.

== Films ==
Howarth's collaborations with John Carpenter include: Escape from New York, Halloween II, Halloween III: Season of the Witch, Christine, Big Trouble in Little China, Prince of Darkness and They Live.

His music has been featured in films like The Osterman Weekend, The Lost Empire, Retribution, Halloween 4: The Return of Michael Myers, Halloween 5: The Revenge of Michael Myers, Halloween: The Curse of Michael Myers, The Dentist and The Dentist 2, Boo, Evilution, Basement Jack, Hansel and Gretel, Zombie Night, and Brutal.

His award-winning sound designs have appeared in Star Trek: The Motion Picture, Star Trek II: The Wrath of Khan, Star Trek III: The Search for Spock, Star Trek IV: The Voyage Home, Star Trek V: The Final Frontier, and Star Trek VI: The Undiscovered Country, Raiders of the Lost Ark, Poltergeist, Back to the Future Part II, Back to the Future Part III, The Little Mermaid and Total Recall. His team received Academy Award awards for Best Sound Effects for The Hunt for Red October and Bram Stoker's Dracula directed by Francis Ford Coppola. He has also created some sound effects for Sound Ideas's award-winning "Series 6000: The General" royalty-free sound effects library.

== Live performance ==
Howarth performs his film scores in live concert to excerpts from the films, and has performed in Geneva, Kraków, St. Petersburg, New York, Los Angeles, Toronto, London and Paris.

== Sound technology ==
Howarth pioneered immersive multi-channel surround sound systems with Steven Taylor's "Dimension Audio" that included the early prototype theatrical 48.4 systems that are now known as Dolby Atmos and DTS sound immersion. His current research has resulted in founding of RA Music, which holds several worldwide patents for the conversion of standard musical recordings into tunings of the natural frequency spectrum as defined by nature, science and ancient architecture.

== Filmography ==
Year	Title	Role(s)	Notes
1979	Star Trek: The Motion Picture	Sound effects creator	
1980	The Final Countdown	Special sound effects, composer	
1980	Galaxina	Special sound effects	
1980	Battle Beyond the Stars	Special sound effects	
1981	Student Bodies	Electronic music producer, electronic music recording	
1981	Escape from New York	Sound effects, music composer	With John Carpenter
1981	Halloween II	Music composer	With John Carpenter
1981	Raiders of the Lost Ark	Special sound effects	Uncredited
1982	Star Trek II: The Wrath of Khan	Special sound effects	
1982	Poltergeist	Special sound effects	
1982	National Lampoon's Class Reunion	Special sound effects	
1982	Flying High II: The Sequel	Special sound effects	
1982	The Thing	Special sound effects, additional music	With John Carpenter
1982	Halloween III: Season of the Witch	Music composer	With John Carpenter
1983	Christine	Music composer	With John Carpenter
1983	The Osterman Weekend	Electronic sound designer	
1983	Twilight Zone: The Movie	Special sound effects	
1984	Star Trek III: The Search for Spock	Special sound effects	
1984	Gremlins	Special sound effects	Uncredited
1984	Buckaroo Banzai	Special synthesized sound effects	
1984	Exterminator 2	Sound effects creator	
1984	Hyperspace	Synthesized sound effects	
1984	The Lost Empire	Music composer	
1985	Head Office	Music composer	With James Newton Howard
1985	Runaway Train	Electronic sound effects	
1985	My Science Project	Special sound effects	
1986	Wired to Kill	Special sound effects	
1986	Star Trek IV: The Voyage Home	Special sound effects	
1986	Duet for One	Electronic sound effects	
1986	Big Trouble in Little China	Music composer	With John Carpenter
1987	Prince of Darkness	Music composer	With John Carpenter
1987	Retribution	Music composer	
1987	The Running Man	Sound processing	
1988	Halloween 4: The Return of Michael Myers	Music composer	
1988	Brothers in Arms	Music composer	
1988	They Live	Music composer, synthesized sound effects	With John Carpenter
1988	Beetlejuice	Special sound effects	Uncredited
1988	Norman's Awesome Experience	Sound	Uncredited
1988	Phantasm II	Sound designer	
1989	Star Trek V: The Final Frontier	Special sound effects	
1989	The Little Mermaid	Processed sound effects	
1989	Halloween 5: The Revenge of Michael Myers	Music composer	
1990	The Hunt for Red October	Additional sound effects	
1990	Class of 1999	Electronic sound effects, sound effects editor	
1990	Back to the Future Part III	Special sound effects	Uncredited
1990	Total Recall	Special sound effects	
1990	RoboCop 2	Special sound effects	
1990	DuckTales the Movie: Treasure of the Lost Lamp	Processed sound effects	
1990	The Rescuers Down Under	Processed sound effects	
1990	Project Alien	Special effects sound editor	
1991	Final Approach	Additional sound effects	
1991	Cool as Ice	Additional sound design	
1991	Salmonberries	Sound design	
1991	Star Trek VI: The Undiscovered Country	Special sound effects	
1991	Grand Canyon	Special sound effects editor	
1991	The Search for Signs of Intelligent Life in the Universe	Music composer	
1992	Ramayana: The Legend of Prince Rama	Music composer	
1992	Honey, I Blew Up the Kid	Special sound effects	
1992	Army of Darkness	Sound designer, sound supervisor	
1992	Bram Stoker's Dracula	Additional sound effects	
1992	The Waterdance	Sound effects editor	
1992	Fortress	Sound effects editor	
1994	The Mask	Sound effects editor	
1994	Stargate	Processed sound effects	
1995	Halloween: The Curse of Michael Myers	Music composer	
1995	Tank Girl	Special sound effects	
1996	The Dentist	Music composer, special sound effects	
1996	Mørkeleg	Music composer	
1998	The Dentist 2	Music composer	
1999	Her Married Lover	Music composer	
1999	The Omega Code	Music composer, special sound effects	
1999	She's All That	Additional sound designer	
2000	The Prince of Light	Music composer, sound	
2000	Alone with a Stranger	Music composer	
2002	Britney, Baby, One More Time	Sound designer	
2002	Star Trek: Incident at Beta 9	Sound effects	
2003	The Sleep of Reason	Supervising sound editor	
2005	Boo	Music composer	
2007	Headless Horseman	Music composer, sound designer	
2008	The Spiderwick Chronicles	Special sound designer	
2008	Evilution	Music composer	
2012	Brutal	Music composer	
2012	Dead Shadows	Sound designer, sound mixer	
2019	Hoax	Sound designer	
