= Halloween (2018 soundtrack) =

Halloween (Original 2018 Motion Picture Soundtrack)

Film score by John Carpenter, Cody Carpenter and Daniel Davies
- Released: October 18, 2018
- Recorded: 2017–2018
- Genres: Electronic; rock; film score
- Length: 43:29
- Label: Sacred Bones

John Carpenter chronology
| Anthology: Movie Themes 1974–1998 (2017) | Halloween (2018) | Lost Cues: The Thing (2020) |

Cody Carpenter chronology
| Anthology: Movie Themes 1974–1998 (2017) | Halloween (2018) | Astro Aqua Kitty (2021) |

Daniel Davies chronology
| Events Score (2018) | Halloween (2018) | Signals (2021) |

Halloween (Original 2018 Motion Picture Soundtrack) is the soundtrack album to the 2018 film Halloween, which is the eleventh installment in the Halloween franchise and a sequel to the 1978 film of the same name. The film was directed by David Gordon Green and written by Green, Jeff Fradley, and Danny McBride. It stars Jamie Lee Curtis and Nick Castle who reprise their roles as Laurie Strode and Michael Myers, with stuntman James Jude Courtney, who also portrays Myers.

John Carpenter, who previously wrote music for the first three installments of the Halloween franchise, returned for the sequel. His involvement was confirmed in late 2017. He was assisted by his son, Cody Carpenter, and collaborator Daniel Davies for the film score. Many of Carpenter's themes from the original 1978 film, including the title theme, were re-created with modern sounds and technologies. The album was released by Sacred Bones Records on October 18, 2018, in a limited release through iTunes. This was followed by a wide digital and physical release on October 19, coinciding with the film's release. The film score received critical acclaim, with John Carpenter's modernized composition being met with praise.

Vinyl editions of the soundtracks were issued by Sacred Bones and Waxwork Records in four different pressings, and multi-colored variants. On October 18, 2019, nearly a year after its theatrical release, Carpenter released the extended edition of the soundtrack, which consisted of additional music not featured in the film. It was made available through the online music distribution platform Bandcamp, and also released in two-disc vinyl formats.

== Development ==
After previously providing the score for the original Halloween (1978), Halloween II (1981), and Halloween III: Season of the Witch (1982), John Carpenter confirmed in October 2017 that he had made a deal to score the 2018 release. He was joined by his son Cody Carpenter and musician Daniel Davies, with whom John Carpenter had collaborated in Lost Themes, Lost Themes II, Lost Themes Remixed, Classic Themes Redux EP, and Anthology: Movie Themes 1974–1998. Regarding his take on the sequel, he stated, "I will be consulting with the director to see what he feels. I could create a new score, we could update the old score, and amplify it, or we could combine those two things. I'll have to see the movie to see what it requires." He watched the unfinished cut of the film, which included temp music, and praised David Gordon Green for the direction calling it an "interesting experience". John, Cody, and Davies then discussed scoring with Green, asking him to explain the kind of music and the experience he wanted for the film.

John's original 1978 theme, was used as the main title theme for its 2018 sequel, with the influence of modern technology throughout the creative process. Compared to the original 1979 soundtrack, the 2018 version of the album had an energized feel, as John addressed the benefits of the technologies used in it. Asked about the incidental similarities between scoring the original film and its sequel, John said:

"Well, it was very different back in the day, when I did the score, I couldn't score to the picture. I had three days to do the score so I did five or six pieces, I just did them and cut them in at various places where I thought they would work. So it was a whole different process. I just covered everything I could in this limited time I had. But nowadays we can score right to picture it's just a whole different feel, you have the freedom to do so much more. So that's the comparison, also they were able to utilize and modernize some of the old scenes, which seemed to work out okay. I'm very proud of it."

Cody Carpenter, on co-writing music for the film with his father, said he had improvised his method of composing, but the musical arrangements were the prime focus. He said that the collaboration of three people working together on the score makes for a slightly different writing process, due to having to accommodate ideas from each person involved. All the recordings of the score took place in John's house through stage recording.

== Reception ==
Professional ratings
Aggregate scores
| Source | Rating |
|---|---|
| Metacritic | 72/100 |
Review scores
| Source | Rating |
| AllMusic | 4/5 stars |
| Consequence of Sound | A− |
| MusicOMH | 4/5 stars |
| Pitchfork | 7.4/10 |
| Rolling Stone | 3.5/5 stars |
| SputnikMusic | 4.5/5 stars |
| Under the Radar | 8/10 |

The review aggregator Metacritic, which uses a weighted average, assigned Halloween (Original 2018 Motion Picture Soundtrack) a score of 72 out of 100 based on 9 critics, indicating "generally favorable reviews".

Paul Simpson of AllMusic wrote that while familiar sounding, "the soundtrack brings something new to the table instead of being a pointless retread, and in general, it just sounds amazing" and called it "worthwhile for Carpenter or Halloween fans". Writing for Consequence Of Sound, critic Michael Roffman called the soundtrack "arguably the most modern score he's [John Carpenter] ever composed, cutting with a minimalistic edge that might make Trent Reznor and Atticus Ross blush. Even so, the score never loses that Carpenter charm, keeping a tight grip on its origins without sneezing from all the dust." Writing for MusicOMH, Sam Shepherd gave a 4-star rating with a comment: "Fans of the old soundtrack will find much to love in the new interpretation and coming from such iconic source material, Carpenter couldn't really fail. With any luck, the new movie will measure up to the soundtrack and the high expectations that fans of the original movie have for it."

Pitchfork writer Jayson Greene gave 7.4/10, stating, "Just as he did for his 1978 film, John Carpenter provides the score for Halloween's 2018 reboot. But this time, the synths have been cleaned up and dread is occasionally outweighed by winking nostalgia." Rolling Stone critic Kory Grow said, "The music here is icier, more gothic, and more textured than that of the original. It is incredible to hear what Carpenter can do without having to worry about all that pesky directing." Simon K. of SputnikMusic gave a 4.5 score and said "Not only does the film deliver to its fans, this soundtrack elevates the movie and continues to show how hungry 70-year-old Carpenter is in 2018", while Under the Radar's Austin Trunick said "This is a legend being granted the ability to go back and take another crack at one of his most enduring works, and it's clear he's relished the opportunity. You'll not find a scarier record to celebrate the season."

Their work on the soundtrack won the award for "Best Score" at the 2018 Fright Meter Awards.

== Track listing ==
All music is composed by John Carpenter, Cody Carpenter, and Daniel Davies.

Halloween (Original Motion Picture Soundtrack)
| No. | Title | Length |
|---|---|---|
| 1. | "Intro" | 1:14 |
| 2. | "Halloween Theme" | 3:02 |
| 3. | "Laurie's Theme" | 0:44 |
| 4. | "Prison Montage" | 2:46 |
| 5. | "Michael Kills" | 0:33 |
| 6. | "Michael Kills Again" | 3:45 |
| 7. | "The Shape Returns" | 3:32 |
| 8. | "The Bogeyman" | 1:06 |
| 9. | "The Shape Kills" | 0:50 |
| 10. | "Laurie Sees the Shape" | 1:13 |
| 11. | "Wrought Iron Fence" | 0:47 |
| 12. | "The Shape Hunts Allyson" | 0:58 |
| 13. | "Allyson Discovered" | 1:26 |
| 14. | "Say Something" | 3:02 |
| 15. | "Ray's Goodbye" | 1:39 |
| 16. | "The Shape Is Monumental" | 1:57 |
| 17. | "The Shape and Laurie Fight" | 1:54 |
| 18. | "The Grind" | 1:52 |
| 19. | "Trap the Shape" | 2:10 |
| 20. | "The Shape Burns" | 1:31 |
| 21. | "Halloween Triumphant" | 7:28 |
| Total length: | | 43:29 |

Halloween (Original Motion Picture Soundtrack) [Expanded Edition]
| No. | Title | Length |
|---|---|---|
| 1. | "Intro" | 1:15 |
| 2. | "Aaron Meets Michael" | 2:39 |
| 3. | "Halloween Theme" | 3:02 |
| 4. | "Laurie’s Theme" | 0:45 |
| 5. | "Aaron and Dana Enter Laurie’s Compound" | 1:03 |
| 6. | "Laurie’s Past" | 1:07 |
| 7. | "Prison Montage" | 2:47 |
| 8. | "Laurie Breaks Down" | 1:26 |
| 9. | "Karen’s Flashback" | 0:43 |
| 10. | "Lumpy Explores Crash" | 0:35 |
| 11. | "Michael Kills" | 0:34 |
| 12. | "Hawkins Arrives at Crash Site" | 1:30 |
| 13. | "Dana’s in the Shower" | 0:38 |
| 14. | "The Story of Judith’s Death" | 0:56 |
| 15. | "The Gas Station" | 1:16 |
| 16. | "Michael Kills Again" | 3:45 |
| 17. | "Gas Station Aftermath" | 1:04 |
| 18. | "The Shape Returns" | 3:31 |
| 19. | "The Boogeyman" | 1:06 |
| 20. | "The Shape Kills" | 0:51 |
| 21. | "Hawkins Called to Babysitter’s House" | 2:10 |
| 22. | "Laurie Sees the Shape" | 1:13 |
| 23. | "Babysitter Aftermath" | 0:48 |
| 24. | "Sartain Meets Laurie" | 1:03 |
| 25. | "Looking for Allyson" | 1:06 |
| 26. | "Wrought Iron Fence" | 0:48 |
| 27. | "The Shape Hunts Allyson" | 0:59 |
| 28. | "Talking to Cops" | 0:32 |
| 29. | "Allyson Discovered" | 1:26 |
| 30. | "Gun Closet" | 1:02 |
| 31. | "Halloween Theme (I’ve Got Eyes)" | 0:44 |
| 32. | "Sartain’s Gone Mad" | 2:54 |
| 33. | "Say Something" | 3:03 |
| 34. | "Through the Woods" | 1:07 |
| 35. | "Ray’s Goodbye" | 1:40 |
| 36. | "The Shape Attacks Laurie" | 0:37 |
| 37. | "The Shape is Monumental" | 1:59 |
| 38. | "Searching for the Shape" | 0:48 |
| 39. | "Mannequin Panic" | 0:50 |
| 40. | "Death Drum" | 1:23 |
| 41. | "The Shape and Laurie Fight" | 1:56 |
| 42. | "The Grind" | 1:53 |
| 43. | "Trap the Shape" | 2:11 |
| 44. | "The Shape Burns" | 1:32 |
| 45. | "Halloween Triumphant" | 7:29 |

== Release history ==
Halloween (Original 2018 Motion Picture Soundtrack) was first released on Apple Music on October 18, 2018, and received a wide digital and physical release the following day. Sacred Bones Records, in collaboration with Waxwork Records, released the film's digital CD and vinyl soundtracks (under the catalog code SBR-213). The vinyl copies consisted of nearly 25 variants in four pressings, and are available in multi-colored variants in different stores and titles in several regions, pricing from £150 (US$205.48) to £2,000 (US$2,739.73).

In September 2019, John Carpenter announced the release of the soundtrack's extended edition, which was due for release on October 18, 2019 (nearly a year after the film's release). The soundtrack was released through the online music distribution platform Bandcamp, but not available on other digital platforms. Sacred Bones (under the catalog code SBR-231) and Waxwork Records released the expanded edition in multiple vinyl pressings.

Halloween (Original 2018 Motion Picture Soundtrack)
| First Pressing | Second Pressing |
| Clear with "Orange Pumpkin" Inset "Art Edition" (Sacred Bones Mail-order Exclusive); Red and Black Splatter "Art Edition" (John Carpenter Tour Exclusive); Pumpkin Orange (US Record Store Exclusive and UK Dinked Edition); Bloody Knife (UK Record Store Exclusive) (Note: Unpriced); Orange and White Starburst (Newbury Comics Exclusive); Dirty Bloody Mask (FYE Exclusive); Orange and Black Starburst (Rough Trade Exclusive); Michael Myers (Waxwork Exclusive); Half Black / Half Orange (Australian Exclusive); "Bloody Pumpkin" (Books-a-Million Exclusive); Black | Blood Puddle "Art Edition" (available via Sacred Bones and Independent Record Stores) |
| Third Pressing (Note: Expanded edition) | Fourth Pressing |
| Orange & Silver Starburst (Discogs Exclusive); Glow-in-the-Dark; Candy Corn (Vinyl Me, Please Exclusive); Orange & Black; Jack 'o Lantern (Waxwork Exclusive); Pool of Blood (Bull Moose Exclusive); Bloody Jumpsuit (Sacred Bones Society Exclusive); Neon Orange (FYE Exclusive); Orange in Clear with Black Splatter (Newbury Comics Exclusive) | Orange and Black Pinwheel (Newbury Comics Exclusive) |

== Charts ==
| Chart (2018) | Peak position |
|---|---|
| Belgian Albums (Ultratop Wallonia) | 148 |
| UK Soundtrack Albums (OCC) | 31 |
| US Soundtrack Albums (Billboard) | 23 |
