= Lost Themes III: Alive After Death =

Studio album by John Carpenter, Cody Carpenter, and Daniel Davies
- Released: February 5, 2021
- Genre: Electronic; film score
- Length: 40:25
- Label: Sacred Bones

John Carpenter chronology
Lost Cues: The Thing (2020)	Lost Themes III: Alive After Death (2021)	Halloween Kills (2021)

Cody Carpenter chronology
The Legend of Ludrium (2020)	Lost Themes III: Alive After Death (2021)	Astro Aqua Kitty (2021)

Daniel Davies chronology
Signals (2020)	Lost Themes III: Alive After Death (2021)	Halloween Kills (2021)

Lost Themes III: Alive After Death is the third studio album by American film director and composer John Carpenter. It was released on February 5, 2021, through Sacred Bones Records. The album was created in collaboration with Carpenter's son Cody Carpenter and his godson Daniel Davies.

== Release ==
On October 28, 2020, John Carpenter announced the release of the album, working alongside his son Cody Carpenter and godson Daniel Davies.

=== Singles ===
On July 3, 2020, Carpenter released "Skeleton", which would be the first single from the album. The single was released as a deluxe limited-edition 12-inch on August 28, 2020, with previously released B-side single "Unclean Spirit". In a press release of the single, Carpenter explained: "It was refreshing to be able to write music that didn’t have to fit to any sort of locked image. We also had a specific focus and direction we wanted to follow when working on Halloween, both in terms of mindset and instruments, and being able to return to working without that narrow focus was refreshing."

The second single "Weeping Ghost" was released on October 28, 2020, the same day as the announcement of the album release date. The single was voted number 38 on Consequence of Sound's Top 50 songs of 2020.

The third single "The Dead Walk" was released on December 7, 2020.

== Critical reception ==
Professional ratings
Aggregate scores
Source	Rating
AnyDecentMusic?	6.9/10
Metacritic	7 5/100
Review scores
Source	Rating
AllMusic	4/5 stars
Clash	7/10
Consequence of Sound	B+
Exclaim!	7/10
Kerrang!	4/5 stars
Metal Hammer	4/5 stars
musicOMH	3.5/5 stars
Pitchfork	6.1/10
Rolling Stone	3.5/5 stars
Uncut	7/10

Lost Themes III: Alive After Death was met with "generally favorable" reviews from critics. At Metacritic, which assigns a weighted average rating out of 100 to reviews from mainstream publications, this release received an average score of 75 based on 12 reviews. At AnyDecentMusic?, the release was given a 6.9 out of 10 based on 12 reviews.

Writing for AllMusic, Heather Phares gave the album four stars out of five, explaining "Lost Themes III's ebb and flow of interludes and set pieces has a cohesion that rivals his soundtracks. Carpenter delivers wonderfully spooky atmospheres on tracks like "Turning the Bones" and "Dripping Blood," a moment of somber, introspective beauty that stands in contrast to its Grand Guignol title. Sam Walker-Smart of Clash said: "This third volume fits perfectly in with his previous work, brooding synths and grinding basslines propelling each track - but there's a shift to modernity too. This latest set is a must-listen for both fans of The Fog and those who love their instrumental music dripping with malice and danger." At Exclaim!, Luke Pearson gave the release a 7 out of 10, explaining the album is "a collection of original scores for films that don't actually exist, the series offers the fun of imagining all the standard horror imagery from the Carpenter-verse its music could accompany. While this third entry could be classified as largely more of the same, there's enough freshness here to warrant a closer look, especially if you're already a fan of the project."

In a review for musicOMH, Matt Cotsell gave the release a 3.5 out of 5, saying: "The third full length album of dystopian disco by John Carpenter, in his Lost Themes franchise, as oddly thrilling as it is, finds the acclaimed director getting a little lost as he navigates the pitfalls of his own mythology. The issue isn’t the quality of music contained within, as it’s yet another hyper polished and gratifyingly nimble selection of intimidating '80s maximalist electro that would elevate any soundtrack it found itself on, even though it’s been made clear these tracks weren’t specifically built for cinematic usage."

== Track listing ==
All tracks are written by John Carpenter, Cody Carpenter, and Daniel Davies.

Lost Themes III: Alive After Death track listing
No.	Title	Length
1.	"Alive After Death"	4:04
2.	"Weeping Ghost"	3:33
3.	"Dripping Blood"	3:54
4.	"Dead Eyes"	3:26
5.	"Vampire's Touch"	4:30
6.	"Cemetery"	4:11
7.	"Skeleton"	3:13
8.	"Turning the Bones"	3:33
9.	"The Dead Walk"	4:25
10.	"Carpathian Darkness"	5:36
Total length:		40:25

== Personnel ==
- John Carpenter – instrumentation, recording
- Cody Carpenter – instrumentation, recording
- Daniel Davies – instrumentation, recording
- John Spiker – mixing, mastering
- Sophie Gransard – photography
- Chris Bilheimer – design

== Charts ==
Chart performance for Lost Themes III
Chart (2021)	Peak position
Belgian Albums (Ultratop Wallonia)	155
Scottish Albums (OCC)	15
US Top Alternative Albums (Billboard)	21
US Top Album Sales (Billboard)	11
US Vinyl Albums (Billboard)	5

== Future ==
A fourth Lost Themes album was announced in March 2024, subtitled Noir. It was again recorded in collaboration with John Carpenter, Cody Carpenter and Daniel Davies. It was released on May 3 on Sacred Bones Records. The album was preceded by the single and official video "My Name is Death".
