= Lost Themes Remixed =

Remix album by John Carpenter, Cody Carpenter and Daniel Davies
- Released: October 16, 2015
- Genre: Electronic; industrial
- Length: 39:47
- Label: Sacred Bones

John Carpenter chronology
Lost Themes (2015)	Lost Themes Remix (2015)	Lost Themes II (2016)

Cody Carpenter chronology
Lost Themes (2015)	Lost Themes Remix (2015)	Condemned (2015)

Daniel Davies chronology
Lost Themes (2015)	Lost Themes Remix (2015)	Condemned (2015)

Professional ratings
Review scores
Source	Rating
AllMusic	3.5/5 stars

Lost Themes Remixed is a remix album of songs from the album Lost Themes (2015) by the American film director and composer John Carpenter. It was released on October 16, 2015, through Sacred Bones Records.

== Track listing ==
No.	Title	Length
1.	"Purgatory" (Prurient remix)	5:20
2.	"Night" (Zola Jesus & Dean Hurley remix)	3:40
3.	"Wraith" (ohGr remix)	3:51
4.	"Vortex" (Silent Servant remix)	5:11
5.	"Vortex" (Uniform remix)	3:35
6.	"Fallen" (Blanck Mass remix)	6:27
7.	"Abyss" (J. G. Thirlwell remix)	5:28
8.	"Fallen" (Bill Kouligas remix)	6:15
Total length:		39:47

== Legacy ==
Lost Themes: 10th Anniversary Expanded Edition, an expanded edition of the original album, will be released on May 9, 2025, via Sacred Bones Records, and will feature two previously unreleased songs: "Cruisin' with Mr. Scratch" and "Dominator".
