= Classic Themes Redux EP =

EP by John Carpenter, Cody Carpenter and Daniel Davies
- Released: June 17, 2016
- Recorded: 2016
- Genre: Electronic; film score
- Length: 12:29
- Label: Sacred Bones

John Carpenter chronology
Lost Themes II (2016)	Classic Themes Redux EP (2016)	Anthology: Movie Themes 1974–1998 (2017)

Cody Carpenter chronology
Lost Themes II (2016)	Classic Themes Redux EP (2016)	Anthology: Movie Themes 1974–1998 (2017)

Daniel Davies chronology
Lost Themes II (2016)	Classic Themes Redux EP (2016)	Anthology: Movie Themes 1974–1998 (2017)

Classic Themes Redux EP is the first extended play by American film director and composer John Carpenter. It was released on June 17, 2016, through Sacred Bones Records. The extended play was created in collaboration with Carpenter's son Cody Carpenter and his godson Daniel Davies.

== Track listing ==
All music is composed by John Carpenter.

No.	Title	Length
1.	"Halloween"	2:57
2.	"Escape from New York"	3:33
3.	"Assault on Precinct 13"	2:55
4.	"The Fog"	3:04
Total length:		12:29

"Halloween" b/w "Escape from New York" and "Assault on Precinct 13" b/w "The Fog" were released on 12" vinyl.

== Personnel ==
- John Carpenter – composition, performance
- Cody Carpenter – performance
- Daniel Davies – performance, mixing
- Ryan Nasci - mixing on "Halloween"
- Jay Shaw – design
