= Lost Themes II =

Studio album by John Carpenter, Cody Carpenter and Daniel Davies
- Released: April 15, 2016
- Recorded: 2016
- Genre: Electronic
- Length: 47:22 (CD/digital); 42:52 (vinyl)
- Label: Sacred Bones

John Carpenter chronology
Lost Themes Remixed (2015)	Lost Themes II (2016)	Classic Themes Redux EP (2016)

Cody Carpenter chronology
Condemned (2015)	Lost Themes II (2016)	Classic Themes Redux EP (2016)

Daniel Davies chronology
Condemned (2015)	Lost Themes II (2016)	Classic Themes Redux EP (2016)

Lost Themes II is the second studio album by American film director and composer John Carpenter. It was released on April 15, 2016, through Sacred Bones Records. The album was created in collaboration with Carpenter's son Cody Carpenter and his godson Daniel Davies.

== Critical reception ==
Professional ratings
Aggregate scores
Source	Rating
Metacritic	67/100
Review scores
Source	Rating
AllMusic	4/5 stars
Consequence of Sound	B
Exclaim!	7/10
Mojo	3/5 stars
MusicOMH	3.5/5 stars
Pitchfork	5.6/10
Record Collector	4/5 stars
The Skinny	4/5 stars
Sputnikmusic	4.5/5
Uncut	6/10

Upon its release, Lost Themes II received positive reviews from music critics.

== Track listing ==
All music is composed by John Carpenter, Cody Carpenter and Daniel Davies.

No.	Title	Length
1.	"Distant Dream"	3:51
2.	"White Pulse"	4:20
3.	"Persia Rising"	3:39
4.	"Angel's Asylum"	4:16
5.	"Hofner Dawn"	3:15
6.	"Windy Death"	3:39
7.	"Dark Blues"	4:16
8.	"Virtual Survivor"	3:58
9.	"Bela Lugosi"	3:23
10.	"Last Sunrise"	4:28
11.	"Utopian Facade"	3:47
Total length:		42:52

CD/digital bonus track
No.	Title	Length
12.	"Real Xeno"	4:30
Total length:		47:22

== Personnel ==
- John Carpenter – composition, performance, engineering
- Cody Carpenter – composition, performance, engineering
- Daniel Davies – composition, performance, engineering
- Jay Shaw – design
- Kyle Cassidy – photography
