= Lost Themes =

Studio album by John Carpenter, Cody Carpenter and Daniel Davies
- Released: February 3, 2015
- Genre: Electronic
- Length: 47:53
- Label: Sacred Bones

John Carpenter chronology
Assault on Precinct 13 (2003)	Lost Themes (2015)	Lost Themes Remixed (2015)

Cody Carpenter chronology
Pro-Life (Masters of Horror) (2006)	Lost Themes (2015)	Lost Themes Remixed (2015)

Daniel Davies chronology
I, Frankenstein (2014)	Lost Themes (2015)	Lost Themes Remixed (2015)

Lost Themes is the debut studio album by American film director and composer John Carpenter. It was released on February 3, 2015, through Sacred Bones Records. Carpenter created Lost Themes in collaboration with his son Cody Carpenter and his godson Daniel Davies. While Lost Themes is his first stand-alone album, Carpenter has composed numerous critically acclaimed soundtracks for films since the 1970s, including for the films Assault on Precinct 13, Halloween, and Escape from New York.

== Background ==
On the album's production and recording, Carpenter stated:

Lost Themes was all about having fun. It can be both great and bad to score over images, which is what I’m used to. Here there were no pressures. No actors asking me what they’re supposed to do. No crew waiting. No cutting room to go to. No release pending. It’s just fun. And I couldn’t have a better set-up at my house, where I depended on Cody [Carpenter] and Daniel [Davies] to bring me ideas as we began improvising. The plan was to make my music more complete and fuller, because we had unlimited tracks. I wasn’t dealing with just analogue anymore. It’s a brand new world. And there was nothing in any of our heads when we started other than to make it moody.

== Critical reception ==
Professional ratings
Aggregate scores
Source	Rating
Metacritic	74/100
Review scores
Source	Rating
AllMusic	4/5 stars
Consequence of Sound	B
Exclaim!	8/10
Pitchfork	7.6/10
PopMatters	7/10
Rolling Stone	2.5/5 stars
The Skinny	4/5 stars
Uncut	7/10
Under the Radar	6.5/10

Upon its release, Lost Themes received positive reviews from music critics. At Metacritic, which assigns a normalized rating out of 100 to reviews from critics, the album received an average score of 74, which indicates "generally favorable reviews", based on 12 reviews. Writing for AllMusic, Heather Phares stated that "a big part of Lost Themes' brilliance lies in Carpenter's refusal to update his aesthetic — the more '80s it is, the more vital it sounds." She also further commented: "As he leaps from one thrill to the next, he evokes his past without rehashing it, delivering a complete and immensely satisfying portrait of his music along the way." Consequence of Sound critic Dan Bogosian thought that "Carpenter’s limited instrumentation started as a strength," writing: "these Lost Themes could stand with any of his horror soundscapes." Exclaim! critic Cam Lindsay described the album as "a brand new soundtrack that doesn't require a film" and observed: "Carpenter knows exactly how to appease his fans, and with Lost Themes, he has given them just what they want." Aaron Leitko of Pitchfork wrote: "Lost Themes is plenty dark and heavy but shorter on inspiration." Andy Beta of Rolling Stone was mixed in his assessment of the album, stating: "The icy synths of "Vortex" and "Fallen" evoke vintage Carpenter dread, but the prog-pomp of "Domain" and "Mystery" are the aural equivalent of too much CGI."

== Charts ==
The album debuted at number 44 on the UK Albums Chart. Stateside, Lost Themes peaked at #129 on the Billboard 200.

== Track listing ==
All music is composed by John Carpenter, Cody Carpenter and Daniel Davies.

No.	Title	Length
1.	"Vortex"	4:44
2.	"Obsidian"	8:24
3.	"Fallen"	4:44
4.	"Domain"	6:33
5.	"Mystery"	4:35
6.	"Abyss"	6:06
7.	"Wraith"	4:30
8.	"Purgatory"	4:38
9.	"Night"	3:38
Total length:		47:53

Digital bonus tracks
No.	Title	Length
10.	"Night" (Zola Jesus and Dean Hurley remix)	3:39
11.	"Wraith" (ohGr remix)	3:51
12.	"Vortex" (Silent Servant remix)	5:10
13.	"Fallen" (Blanck Mass remix)	6:29
14.	"Abyss" (J. G. Thirlwell remix)	5:29
15.	"Fallen" (Bill Kouligas remix)	6:14
Total length:		1:18:45

== Personnel ==
- John Carpenter – composition, performance, engineering
- Cody Carpenter – composition, performance, engineering
- Daniel Davies – composition, performance, engineering
- Jay Shaw – design
- Kyle Cassidy – photography

== Legacy ==
Lost Themes: 10th Anniversary Expanded Edition, an expanded edition of the original album, was released on May 9, 2025, via Sacred Bones Records, and will feature two previously unreleased songs: "Cruisin' with Mr. Scratch" and "Dominator".
