= Firestarter (2022 film) =

2022 film by Keith Thomas

- Release poster
- Directed by: Keith Thomas
- Screenplay by: Scott Teems
- Based on: Firestarter by Stephen King
- Produced by: Jason Blum; Akiva Goldsman
- Starring: Zac Efron; Ryan Kiera Armstrong; Sydney Lemmon; Kurtwood Smith; John Beasley; Michael Greyeyes; Gloria Reuben
- Cinematography: Karim Hussain
- Edited by: Tim Alverson
- Music by: John Carpenter; Cody Carpenter; Daniel Davies
- Production companies: Blumhouse Productions; Weed Road Pictures
- Distributed by: Universal Pictures
- Release date: May 13, 2022 (United States)
- Running time: 94 minutes
- Country: United States
- Language: English
- Budget: $12 million
- Box office: $15 million

Firestarter is a 2022 American science fiction horror thriller film directed by Keith Thomas, from a screenplay by Scott Teems, based on Stephen King's novel of the same name, and a remake of the 1984 film of the same name. The film stars Zac Efron, Ryan Kiera Armstrong, Sydney Lemmon, Kurtwood Smith, John Beasley (in his final film role), Michael Greyeyes, and Gloria Reuben. It is produced by Jason Blum and Akiva Goldsman under their Blumhouse Productions and Weed Road Pictures banners, respectively.

Firestarter was released in the United States on May 13, 2022, by Universal Pictures simultaneously theatrically and through streaming on Peacock. The film received negative reviews from critics, with many deeming it to be inferior to the original 1984 film, and grossed $15 million worldwide against a $12 million budget. Armstrong was nominated for the Golden Raspberry Award for Worst Actress, but it was rescinded due to controversy over her young age.

== Plot ==
In a flashback, baby Charlene "Charlie" McGee sits in her crib, spontaneously setting the room ablaze with her pyrokinesis power and sending her father Andrew "Andy" McGee into a panic. In another flashback, a young Andy and his girlfriend Victoria "Vicky" Tomlinson talk to a doctor in a clinical trial, who explains to them that they will be injected with the experimental chemical drug Lot-6, which secretly gives them supernatural powers: Andy gains telepathy, and Vicky gains telekinesis.

In the present day, Charlie is sitting at the kitchen table after having a nightmare. Her parents join her and Charlie explains that she has been repressing something bad, her powers becoming more unstable. She unintentionally causes a ruckus at her school after exploding a bathroom stall due to anger at being bullied. Andy is shown using his power, "the push", to influence a client to stop smoking, although the strain causes his eyes to bleed.

Meanwhile, in a secret facility, Captain Jane Hollister, leader of the Department of Scientific Intelligence (DSI), is monitoring thermal signatures caused by Charlie's outbursts. She visits Doctor Joseph Wanless, creator of Lot-6 and the resulting superhumans, who implores Hollister to terminate Charlie before her powers become uncontrollable. Hollister enlists fellow superhuman John Rainbird to assist her. Rainbird visits the McGee home, confronting Vicky, who attempts to counterattack with her repressed telekinetic powers. Rainbird kills her, holding Charlie at knifepoint as she and Andy enter the home. Charlie's powers overwhelm him and she sends a concussive burst of flames throughout the house. Andy and Charlie escape into their truck.

On the road, they encounter a man named Irv Manders. After using the push to convince Irv to take them to Boston, they hitch a ride with him, stopping off at his house. After Charlie accidentally stumbles upon his paralyzed wife, Irv flies into a rage before conceding that he occasionally overreacts. Irv sits up all night watching a news report of the incident at the McGee home, which is being framed as murder by Andy. Irv and Andy argue before Andy explains to Irv that he is just trying to protect his daughter. Charlie tells Irv, after speaking telepathically with his wife, that she forgives him for the accident that left her paralyzed, causing him to relent and attempt to protect Andy and Charlie when the police appear due to his prior emergency call. Rainbird appears in the bushes, kills the policemen, and then shoots Irv in the knee before black trucks roll in to pick up Charlie and Andy. Andy uses his push to trick Rainbird so Charlie can escape to a forest. Charlie spends time honing her fire powers before stealing a bike and clothes to follow her father's telepathic message to her from his cell at DSI.

Charlie finds DSI and takes an agent's pass card from him, then kills him after he draws his gun to attack her. She follows a large staircase down to the restricted area where her father is being kept. She reaches her father's glass-fronted cell, from inside which Hollister tells her not to try and burn her, lest she burn her father in the process. Andy tells Charlie that Rainbird, not he, telepathically called for her. Seeing no other way out, and knowing that he will die soon, he apologizes to her and then pushes her to burn the entire place down, starting with Hollister and himself. The now-rogue Charlie sets both on fire, mentally unlocks all the security doors, and walks through the facility killing all of the DSI agents. Rainbird is released when his holding cell is unlocked. Charlie is surrounded by men in fire proximity suits, unable to harm them. The men are about to subdue her when Rainbird shoots them from behind. He surrenders to Charlie and kneels for her judgment. Charlie starts to kill him but sees herself in the mirror and, realizing that he is just as much of a pawn as her, she spares him, before finally burning the rest of the building down. Later, Charlie is seen walking onto a beach with Rainbird following behind. With nowhere to go, Charlie allows Rainbird to carry her, and they walk off together into the night.

== Cast ==
- Zac Efron as Andrew "Andy" McGee, Charlie's telepathic father
- Ryan Kiera Armstrong as Charlene "Charlie" McGee, a troubled girl struggling with anger issues and mood swings mostly due to her pyrokinesis. She is the daughter of Andy and Vicky McGee.
- Sydney Lemmon as Victoria "Vicky" Tomlinson-McGee, Andy's telekinetic wife and Charlie's mother.
- Kurtwood Smith as Dr. Joseph Wanless
- John Beasley as Irv Manders
- Michael Greyeyes as John Rainbird, a bounty hunter assigned by DSI to track down Charlie.
- Gloria Reuben as Captain Jane Hollister, the leader of DSI and a gender-swapped version of James Hollister from the original film.

== Production ==
On April 27, 2017, Universal Pictures and Blumhouse Productions announced a remake of Firestarter (1984), with Akiva Goldsman set to direct and produce alongside Jason Blum. On June 28, 2018, Fatih Akin replaced Goldsman as director, with Scott Teems set to write the script. On December 16, 2019, Keith Thomas replaced Akin as director. In September 2020, Zac Efron joined the cast. In February 2021, Michael Greyeyes joined the cast. In June 2021, Ryan Kiera Armstrong, Gloria Reuben, and Sydney Lemmon were added to the cast. Principal photography began on May 25, 2021, in Toronto and Hamilton, Ontario, and wrapped on July 16.

== Release ==
Firestarter was released in wide theaters by Universal Pictures and on Peacock in the United States on May 13, 2022. Over its first week of streaming, the film was watched in two million households.

=== Home media ===
The film was released on VOD on June 12, 2022, and then on DVD and Blu-ray on June 28, 2022, 45 days after its theatrical release.

== Reception ==
=== Box office ===
Firestarter grossed $9.7 million in the United States and Canada and $5.3 million in other territories, for a worldwide total of $15 million.

In the United States and Canada, the film was released alongside Family Camp, and was projected to gross $5–7 million from 3,412 theaters in its opening weekend. It made $1.54 million on its first day, including $375,000 from Thursday night previews. It went on to debut to $3.8 million, finishing fourth at the box office. The film made $2 million in its second weekend. It dropped out of the box office top ten in its third weekend with $285,270, and returned in its fifth weekend once put in a drive-in theater double feature with Jurassic World Dominion, earning $833,340, only to fall once again in its sixth with $182,365.

Outside the US and Canada, the film earned $2.1 million from 40 markets in its opening weekend. It made $833,000 from 46 markets in its second weekend.

=== Critical response ===
On the review aggregator website Rotten Tomatoes, 10% of 162 critics' reviews are positive, with an average rating of 3.6/10. The website's consensus reads: "There was plenty of room to improve on the original, but Firestarter trips over that low bar and tumbles toward the bottom of the long list of Stephen King adaptations." Metacritic, which uses a weighted average, assigned the film a score of 32 out of 100, based on 29 critics, indicating "generally unfavorable" reviews. Audiences polled by CinemaScore gave the film an average grade of "C−" on an A+ to F scale, while PostTrak reported 50% of audience members gave it a positive score, with 27% saying they would definitely recommend it.

On Common Sense Media, Jeffrey Anderson gave it a 1/5 rating, stating, "Thoroughly bland and uninspired, this cheap-looking adaptation of Stephen King's 1980 novel just goes through the motions, failing to deliver any thrills or scares and feeling utterly pointless." Benjamin Lee of The Guardian also gave it 1/5 stars, writing, "No one here seems to know what they're doing and, more importantly, why. A strong contender for 2022's most pointless movie." Frank Scheck of The Hollywood Reporter wrote, "while it has a few genuine scares... it never achieves the deliriously freaky heights one expects from a film version of one of King's cheesier novels."

Richard Roeper of the Chicago Sun-Times gave it 3/4 stars, calling it "A combustible supernatural thriller that embraces its borderline campy qualities and works well enough as 21st century drive-in escapist fare."

== Future ==
In May 2022, Thomas stated that there are ongoing discussions to possibly expand the film into a franchise, acknowledging that this may be in the form of sequel, prequel, or spin-off media.
