= Anthology: Movie Themes 1974–1998 =

Compilation album by John Carpenter, Cody Carpenter and Daniel Davies
- Released: October 20, 2017
- Recorded: 2017
- Genres: Electronic; rock; film score
- Length: 42:26
- Label: Sacred Bones

John Carpenter chronology
Classic Themes Redux EP (2016)	Anthology: Movie Themes 1974–1998 (2017)	Halloween (2018)

Cody Carpenter chronology
Classic Themes Redux EP (2016)	Anthology: Movie Themes 1974–1998 (2017)	Halloween (2018)

Daniel Davies chronology
Classic Themes Redux EP (2016)	Anthology: Movie Themes 1974–1998 (2017)	Events Score (2018)

Anthology: Movie Themes 1974–1998 is the first compilation album by American film director and composer John Carpenter, released on October 20, 2017, through Sacred Bones Records. The album features re-recordings of Carpenter's best known film score themes, and was created in collaboration with Carpenter's son Cody Carpenter and his godson Daniel Davies. To coincide with the album's release, a remix of "Halloween" by Trent Reznor and Atticus Ross was also released.

== Critical reception ==
Professional ratings
Aggregate scores
Source	Rating
Metacritic	78/100
Review scores
Source	Rating
AllMusic	4/5 stars
Consequence of Sound	B+
Dread Central	5/5 stars
Exclaim!	8/10
The Independent	4/5 stars
Mojo	4/5 stars
musicOMH	4/5 stars
Pitchfork	8.0/10
Record Collector	4/5 stars
Under the Radar	7.5/10

Upon its release, Anthology: Movie Themes 1974–1998 received positive reviews from music critics.

== Track listing ==
All music is composed by John Carpenter, except as noted.

No.	Title	Writer(s)	Length
1.	"In the Mouth of Madness"		5:17
2.	"Assault on Precinct 13"		2:55
3.	"The Fog"		3:03
4.	"Prince of Darkness"		3:12
5.	"Santiago (Vampires)"		2:42
6.	"Escape from New York"		3:32
7.	"Halloween"		2:57
8.	"Porkchop Express (Big Trouble in Little China)"		3:50
9.	"They Live"		3:06
10.	"The Thing"	Ennio Morricone	3:37
11.	"Starman"	Jack Nitzsche	2:34
12.	"Dark Star"		1:26
13.	"Christine"		4:15
Total length:			42:26

Included with the deluxe limited edition vinyl releases was a 7" single that had two tracks that were left off of the album.

Deluxe limited edition vinyl bonus tracks
No.	Title	Writer(s)	Length
14.	"March of the Children (Village of the Damned)"	Carpenter, Dave Davies
15.	"Body Bags"

== Personnel ==
- John Carpenter – composition, performance, recording
- Cody Carpenter – performance, recording
- Daniel Davies – performance, recording

Additional personnel

- John Spiker – recording and bass on "In the Mouth of Madness"
- John Konesky – guitar on "In the Mouth of Madness"
- Scott Seiver – drums on "In the Mouth of Madness"
- Ben Lee – harmonica on "They Live"
- Jay Shaw – layout and design

== Charts ==
Chart (2017)	Peak position
Scottish Albums (Official Charts)	37
UK Albums (Official Charts)	89

== Future ==
In August 2023, a follow up to the album, titled Anthology II: Movie Themes 1976–1988, was released by Sacred Bones Records on October 6, 2023.
