= Halloween III: Season of the Witch (soundtrack) =

Film score by John Carpenter & Alan Howarth
- Released: October 22, 1982
- Studios: Pi West Electronic Music Studio, Glendale, California
- Genres: Electronic; film score
- Length: 36:52
- Labels: MCA; Varèse Sarabande
- Producer: Alan Howarth

John Carpenter chronology
Halloween II (1981)	Halloween III: Season of the Witch (1982)	The Fog (1984)

Alan Howarth chronology
Halloween II (1981)	Halloween III: Season of the Witch (1982)	The Lost Empire (1984)

Alternative cover
- 25th Anniversary Edition

Professional ratings
Review scores
Source	Rating
AllMusic	3.5/5 stars

Halloween III: Season of the Witch is a soundtrack by John Carpenter & Alan Howarth for the film of the same name. It was released in 1982 on vinyl through MCA Records and on CD through Varèse Sarabande. An expanded 25th Anniversary Edition was released in 2007 through Alan Howarth Incorporated. It was the final Halloween soundtrack to be produced by Carpenter, who would eventually return to the franchise to score 2018's Halloween.

== Development ==
The soundtrack was composed by John Carpenter and Alan Howarth, who worked together on the score for Halloween II and several other films. Music remained an important element in establishing the atmosphere of Halloween III. Just as in Halloween and Halloween II, there was no symphonic score. Much of the music was composed to solicit "false startles" from the audience.

The score of Halloween III differed greatly from the familiar main theme of the original and sequel. Carpenter replaced the familiar 5/4 piano melody with an electronic theme (9/16 against a steady 4/4) played on a synthesizer with beeping tonalities. Howarth explains how he and Carpenter composed the music for the third film:

The music style of John Carpenter and myself has further evolved in this film soundtrack by working exclusively with synthesizers to produce our music. This has led to a certain procedural routine. The film is first transferred to a time coded video tape and synchronized to a 24 track master audio recorder; then while watching the film we compose the music to these visual images. The entire process goes quite rapidly and has "instant gratification", allowing us to evaluate the score in synch to the picture. This is quite an invaluable asset.

One of the more memorable aspects of the film's soundtrack was the jingle from the Silver Shamrock Halloween mask commercial. Set to the tune of "London Bridge Is Falling Down", the commercial in the film counts down the number of days until Halloween beginning with day eight followed by an announcer's voice (Tommy Lee Wallace) encouraging children to purchase a Silver Shamrock mask to wear on Halloween night:

Eight more days 'til Halloween,
Halloween, Halloween.
Eight more days 'til Halloween,
Silver Shamrock.

== Track listing ==
All music is composed by John Carpenter & Alan Howarth.

No.	Title	Length
1.	"Main Title"	2:55
2.	"Chariots of Pumpkins"	3:24
3.	"Drive to Santa Mira"	2:29
4.	"Starker and Marge"	1:53
5.	"First Chase"	3:09
6.	"Robots at the Factory"	2:00
7.	"Halloween Montage" (Announcer: Tommy Lee Wallace)	1:38
8.	"Hello Grandma"	4:53
9.	"The Rock"	3:25
10.	"Challis Escapes"	3:30
11.	"South Corridor"	2:58
12.	"Goodbye Ellie"	4:09
Total length:		36:23

25th Anniversary Edition bonus tracks
No.	Title	Length
13.	"Hey Boom"	3:34
14.	"Mask Test Tone"	1:46
15.	"I Really Love This"	1:28
16.	"Local Boy, No Way"	1:28
17.	"The Factory"	0:45
18.	"I Think It's Time"	1:43
19.	"The Man Who Killed"	2:01
20.	"A Pleasure Doing Business"	3:37
21.	"Halloween III Close/Open"	2:41
22.	"Where Is She"	3:30
23.	"It Will Be Morning Soon"	2:43
24.	"Stonehenge"	3:28
25.	"I Do Love a Good Joke"	3:20
Total length:		68:27

== Personnel ==
- John Carpenter – composition, performance
- Alan Howarth - composition, performance, synthesizer programming, sequencing, editing, recording, production
- Tommy Lee Wallace - announcer on "Halloween Montage"
