= John Carpenter =

American filmmaker (born 1948)

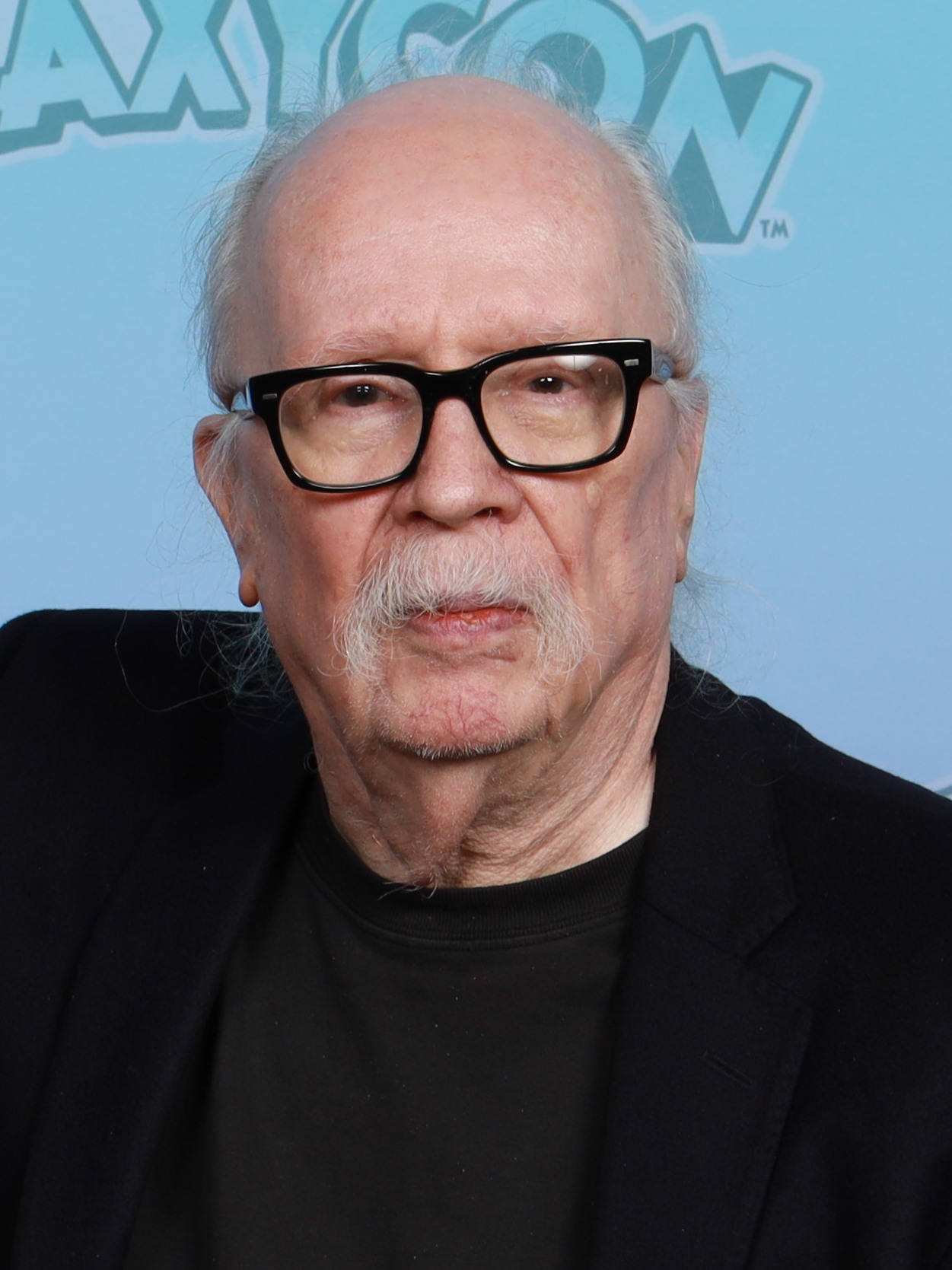
- Carpenter in 2025
- Born: John Howard Carpenter; January 16, 1948 (age 78); Carthage, New York, U.S.
- Other names: John T. Chance; Martin Quatermass; Rip Haight
- Occupations: Filmmaker; composer; actor
- Years active: 1969–present
- Spouses: Adrienne Barbeau (m. 1979; div. 1984) Sandy King (m. 1990)
- Children: Cody Carpenter
- Website: theofficialjohncarpenter.com

John Howard Carpenter (born January 16, 1948) is an American filmmaker, composer, and actor. Most commonly associated with horror, action, and science fiction films of the 1970s and 1980s, he is generally recognized as a master of the horror genre. At the 2019 Cannes Film Festival, the French Directors' Guild gave him the Golden Coach Award and lauded him as "a creative genius of raw, fantastic, and spectacular emotions". On April 3, 2025, he received a star on the Hollywood Walk of Fame.

Carpenter's early films included critical and commercial successes such as Halloween (1978), The Fog (1980), Escape from New York (1981), and Starman (1984). Though he has been acknowledged as an influential filmmaker, his other productions from the 1970s and the 1980s only later came to be considered cult classics; these include Dark Star (1974), Assault on Precinct 13 (1976), The Thing (1982), Christine (1983), Big Trouble in Little China (1986), Prince of Darkness (1987), They Live (1988), In the Mouth of Madness (1994), and Escape from L.A. (1996). He returned to the Halloween franchise as a composer and executive producer on Halloween (2018), Halloween Kills (2021), and Halloween Ends (2022).

Carpenter usually composes or co-composes the music in his films. He won a Saturn Award for Best Music for the soundtrack of Vampires (1998) and has released five studio albums: Lost Themes (2015), Lost Themes II (2016), Anthology: Movie Themes 1974–1998 (2017), Lost Themes III: Alive After Death (2021), and Lost Themes IV: Noir (2024). He also produces horror, science fiction, and children's comics through Storm King Comics, the publisher founded by his wife, Sandy King, in 2013.

== Early life ==
John Howard Carpenter was born in Carthage, New York, on January 16, 1948, the son of Milton Jean (née Carter) and music professor Howard Ralph Carpenter. In 1953, after his father accepted a job at Western Kentucky University, the family relocated to Bowling Green, Kentucky, which he later described as "the Jim Crow south in the 1950s", saying "Everything I know about evil I learned in that small town of Bowling Green, Kentucky." For much of his childhood, he and his family lived in a log cabin on the university's campus. He has spoken of his father's encouraging him to learn to play the violin, which contributed to him being bullied, "a mark for violence with my violin, which made me hate it all the more".

He was interested in films from an early age, particularly the westerns of Howard Hawks and John Ford, 1950s low-budget horror films such as The Thing from Another World (which he remade in 1982 as The Thing), and high-budget sci-fi such as Godzilla and Forbidden Planet. Carpenter began making short horror films with an 8 mm camera before he had even started high school. Just before he turned 14 in 1962, he made a few major short films: Godzilla vs. Gorgo, featuring Godzilla and Gorgo via claymation, and the sci-fi western Terror from Space, starring the one-eyed creature from It Came from Outer Space. He graduated from College High School, then enrolled at Western Kentucky University for two years as an English major and history minor. With a desire to study film-making, which no university in Kentucky offered at the time, he transferred to the USC School of Cinematic Arts and moved to California in 1968. He ultimately dropped out of school in his final semester in order to make his first feature film.

== Career ==
=== Early career: 1969–1979 ===
In a beginning film course at USC Cinema during 1969, Carpenter wrote and directed an eight-minute short film, Captain Voyeur. The film was rediscovered in the USC archives in 2011 and proved interesting because it revealed elements that would appear in his later film, Halloween (1978).

The next year he collaborated with producer John Longenecker as co-writer, film editor, and music composer for The Resurrection of Broncho Billy (1970), which won an Academy Award for Best Live Action Short Film. The short film was enlarged to 35 mm, sixty prints were made, and the film was released theatrically by Universal Studios for two years in the United States and Canada.

Carpenter's first major film as director, Dark Star (1974), was a science-fiction comedy that he co-wrote with Dan O'Bannon (who later went on to write Alien, borrowing freely from much of Dark Star). The film reportedly cost only $60,000 to make. It was difficult to make as both Carpenter and O'Bannon completed the film by multitasking, with Carpenter doing the musical score as well as the writing, producing, and directing, while O'Bannon acted in the film and did the special effects (which caught the attention of George Lucas who hired him to work with the special effects for the film Star Wars). Carpenter received praise for his ability to make low-budget films.

Carpenter's next film was Assault on Precinct 13 (1976), a low-budget thriller influenced by the films of Howard Hawks, particularly Rio Bravo. As with Dark Star, Carpenter was responsible for many aspects of the film's creation. He not only wrote, directed, and scored it, but also edited the film using the pseudonym "John T. Chance" (the name of John Wayne's character in Rio Bravo). Carpenter has said that he considers Assault on Precinct 13 to have been his first real film because it was the first film that he filmed on a schedule. The film was the first time Carpenter worked with Debra Hill, who would collaborate with Carpenter on some of his most well-known films.

Carpenter assembled a main cast that consisted of experienced but relatively obscure actors. The two main actors were Austin Stoker, who had appeared previously in science fiction, disaster, and blaxploitation films, and Darwin Joston, who had worked primarily for television and had once been Carpenter's next-door neighbor.

The film received a critical reassessment in the United States, where it is now generally regarded as one of the best exploitation films of the 1970s.

Carpenter both wrote and directed the Lauren Hutton thriller Someone's Watching Me!. This television film is the tale of a single, working woman who, soon after arriving in L.A., discovers that she is being stalked.

Eyes of Laura Mars, a 1978 thriller featuring Faye Dunaway and Tommy Lee Jones and directed by Irvin Kershner, was adapted (in collaboration with David Zelag Goodman) from a spec script titled Eyes, written by Carpenter, and would become Carpenter's first major studio film of his career.

Halloween (1978) was a commercial success and helped develop the slasher genre. Originally an idea suggested by producer Irwin Yablans (titled The Babysitter Murders), who thought of a film about babysitters being menaced by a stalker, Carpenter took the idea and another suggestion from Yablans that it occur during Halloween and developed a story. Carpenter said of the basic concept: "Halloween night. It has never been the theme in a film. My idea was to do an old haunted house film."

Film director Bob Clark suggested in an interview released in 2005 that Carpenter had asked him for his own ideas for a sequel to his 1974 film Black Christmas (written by Roy Moore) that featured an unseen and motiveless killer murdering students in a university sorority house. As also stated in the 2009 documentary Clarkworld (written and directed by Clark's former production designer Deren Abram after Clark's tragic death in 2007), Carpenter directly asked Clark about his thoughts on developing the anonymous slasher in Black Christmas:

...I did a film about three years later, started a film with John Carpenter, it was his first film for Warner Bros. (which picked up 'Black Christmas'), he asked me if I was ever gonna do a sequel, and I said no. I was through with horror, I didn't come into the business to do just horror. He said, "Well, what would you do if you did do a sequel?" I said it would be the next year, and the guy would have actually been caught, escape from a mental institution, go back to the house, and they would start all over again. And I would call it 'Halloween'. The truth is John didn't copy 'Black Christmas', he wrote a script, directed the script, did the casting. 'Halloween' is his movie, and besides, the script came to him already titled anyway. He liked 'Black Christmas' and may have been influenced by it, but John Carpenter did not copy the idea. Fifteen other people had thought to do a movie called 'Halloween,' but the script came to John with that title on it.

— Bob Clark, 2005

The film was written by Carpenter and Debra Hill with Carpenter stating that the music was inspired by both Dario Argento's Suspiria (which also influenced the film's slightly surreal color scheme) and William Friedkin's The Exorcist.

Carpenter again worked with a relatively small budget, $300,000. The budget was so small the actors provided their own costumes. The film grossed more than $65 million initially, making it one of the most successful independent films of all time.

Carpenter has described Halloween as "true crass exploitation. I decided to make a film I would love to have seen as a kid, full of cheap tricks like a haunted house at a fair where you walk down the corridor and things jump out at you". The film has often been cited as an allegory on the virtue of sexual purity and the danger of casual sex, although Carpenter has explained that this was not his intent: "It has been suggested that I was making some kind of moral statement. Believe me, I'm not. In Halloween, I viewed the characters as simply normal teenagers."

In addition to the film's critical and commercial success, Carpenter's self-composed "Halloween Theme" became recognizable in its own right.

In 1979, Carpenter began what was to be the first of several collaborations with actor Kurt Russell when he directed the television film Elvis.

=== Commercial successes: 1980s ===
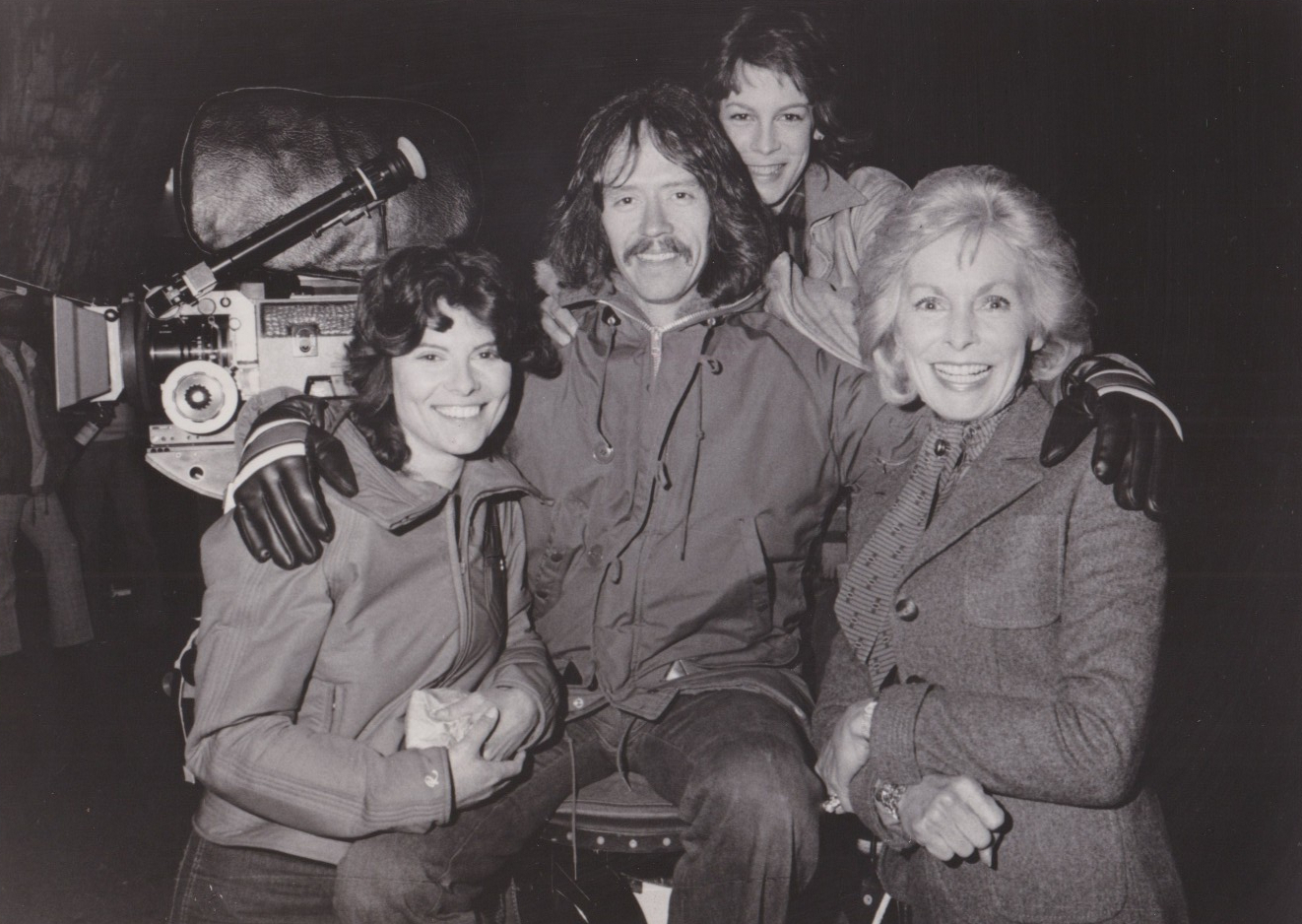
Carpenter (center) with Adrienne Barbeau, Janet Leigh, and Jamie Lee Curtis during the filming of The Fog. 1979

Carpenter followed up the success of Halloween with The Fog (1980), a ghostly revenge tale (co-written by Hill) inspired by horror comics such as Tales from the Crypt and by The Crawling Eye, a 1958 film about monsters hiding in clouds.

Completing The Fog was an unusually difficult process for Carpenter. After viewing a rough cut of the film, he was dissatisfied with the result. For the only time in his filmmaking career, Carpenter had to devise a way to salvage a nearly finished film that did not meet his standards. In order to make the film more coherent and frightening, Carpenter filmed additional footage that included new scenes.

Despite production problems and mostly negative critical reception, The Fog was another commercial success for Carpenter. The film was made on a budget of $1,000,000, but it grossed over $21,000,000 in the United States alone. Carpenter has said that The Fog is not his favorite film, although he considers it a "minor horror classic".

Carpenter immediately followed The Fog with the science-fiction adventure Escape from New York (1981). Featuring several actors that Carpenter had collaborated with (Kurt Russell, Donald Pleasence, Adrienne Barbeau, Tom Atkins, Charles Cyphers, and Frank Doubleday) or would collaborate with again (Harry Dean Stanton), and other actors (Lee Van Cleef and Ernest Borgnine), it became both commercially successful (grossing more than $25 million) and critically acclaimed (with an 85% on Rotten Tomatoes).

His next film, The Thing (1982), has high production values, including innovative special effects by Rob Bottin, special visual effects by matte artist Albert Whitlock, a score by Ennio Morricone and a cast including Russell and respected character actors such as Wilford Brimley, Richard Dysart, Charles Hallahan, Keith David, and Richard Masur. The Thing was distributed by Universal Pictures. Although Carpenter's film used the same source material as the 1951 Howard Hawks film, The Thing from Another World, it is more faithful to the John W. Campbell Jr. novella Who Goes There?, upon which both films were based. Moreover, unlike the Hawks film, The Thing was part of what Carpenter later called his "Apocalypse Trilogy", a trio of films (The Thing, Prince of Darkness, and In the Mouth of Madness) with bleak endings for the film's characters.

The Thing is a graphic, sinister horror film; in a 1999 interview, Carpenter said audiences rejected it for its nihilistic, depressing viewpoint at a time when the United States was in the midst of a recession. When it opened, it was competing against the critically and commercially successful E.T. the Extra-Terrestrial ($619 million), a family-friendly film released two weeks earlier that offered a more optimistic take on alien visitation.

The impact on Carpenter was immediate – he lost the job of directing the 1984 science fiction horror film Firestarter because of The Thing's poor performance. His previous success had gained him a multiple-film contract at Universal, but the studio opted to buy him out of it instead. He continued making films afterward but lost confidence, and did not openly talk about The Thing's failure until a 1985 interview with Starlog, where he said, "I was called 'a pornographer of violence' ... I had no idea it would be received that way ... The Thing was just too strong for that time. I knew it was going to be strong, but I didn't think it would be too strong ... I didn't take the public's taste into consideration."

While The Thing was not initially successful, it was able to find new audiences and appreciation on home video, and later on television.

In the years following its release, critics and fans have reevaluated The Thing as a milestone of the horror genre. A prescient review by Peter Nicholls in 1992, called The Thing "a black, memorable film [that] may yet be seen as a classic". It has been called one of the best films directed by Carpenter. John Kenneth Muir called it "Carpenter's most accomplished and underrated directorial effort", and critic Matt Zoller Seitz said it "is one of the greatest and most elegantly constructed B-movies ever made".Trace Thurman described it as one of the best films ever, and in 2008, Empire magazine selected it as one of The 500 Greatest Movies of All Time, at number 289, calling it "a peerless masterpiece of relentless suspense, retina-wrecking visual excess and outright, nihilistic terror". It is now considered to be one of the greatest horror films ever made.

Carpenter's next film, Christine, was the 1983 adaptation of the Stephen King novel of the same name. The story concerns a high-school nerd named Arnie Cunningham (Keith Gordon) who buys a junked 1958 Plymouth Fury which turns out to have supernatural powers. As Cunningham restores and rebuilds the car, he becomes unnaturally obsessed with it, with deadly consequences. Christine did respectable business upon its release and was received well by critics. He said he directed it because it was the only thing offered to him at the time.

Starman (1984) was produced by Michael Douglas; the script was well received by Columbia Pictures, which chose it in preference to the script for E.T. and prompted Steven Spielberg to go to Universal Pictures. Douglas chose Carpenter to be the director because of his reputation as an action director who could also convey strong emotion. Starman was reviewed favorably by the Los Angeles Times, New York Times, and LA Weekly, and described by Carpenter as a film he envisioned as a romantic comedy similar to It Happened One Night only with a space alien. The film received Oscar and Golden Globe nominations for Jeff Bridges' portrayal of Starman and received a Golden Globe nomination for Best Musical Score for Jack Nitzsche.

After the commercial disappointment of action–comedy Big Trouble in Little China (1986), Carpenter struggled to secure high-profile film offers and resumed making lower budget films such as Prince of Darkness (1987). Some of these films, including They Live (1988), later developed cult followings, but Carpenter did not regain the same level of mainstream industry attention.

=== Later career: 1990–2009 ===
Carpenter's 1990s films, including Memoirs of an Invisible Man (1992) and Village of the Damned (1995), did not achieve the same initial commercial success of his earlier work. Carpenter made Body Bags, a television horror anthology film in collaboration with Tobe Hooper and In the Mouth of Madness (1995), a Lovecraftian homage that was not successful commercially or with critics, but now has a cult following. Escape from L.A. (1996), the sequel of the cult classic Escape from New York, received mixed reviews but has also gained a cult following since its release. Vampires (1998) featured James Woods as the leader of a band of vampire hunters in league with the Catholic Church.

In 1998, Carpenter composed the soundtrack (titled "Earth/Air") for the video game Sentinel Returns, published for PC and PlayStation.

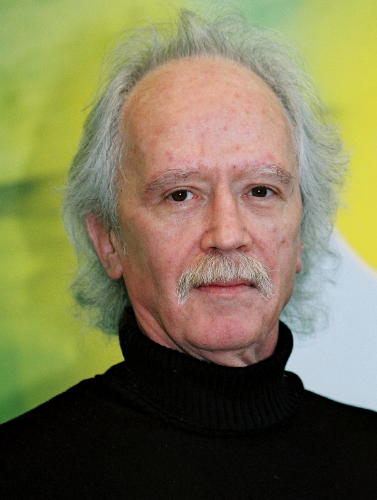
Carpenter in September 2001

In 2001, his film Ghosts of Mars was released but was not successful. During 2005, there were remakes of Assault on Precinct 13 and The Fog, the latter being produced by Carpenter himself, though in an interview he defined his involvement as, "I come in and say hello to everybody. Go home."

Carpenter served as director for a 2005 episode of Showtime's Masters of Horror television series, one of the 13 filmmakers involved in the first season. His episode, "Cigarette Burns", received generally positive reviews from critics and praise from Carpenter's fans. He later directed another original episode for the show's second season in 2006 titled "Pro-Life".

=== 2010s: The Ward, focus on music and return to Halloween ===
The Ward, Carpenter's first film since Ghosts of Mars, premiered at Toronto International Film Festival on September 13, 2010, before a limited release in the United States in July 2011. It received generally poor reviews from critics and grossed only $5.3 million worldwide against an estimated $10 million budget. As of 2025, it is the most recent film he directed.

Carpenter narrated the video game F.E.A.R. 3, while also consulting on its storyline. On October 10, 2010, Carpenter received the Lifetime Award from the Freak Show Horror Film Festival.

On February 3, 2015, the indie label Sacred Bones Records released his album Lost Themes. On October 19, 2015, All Tomorrow's Parties announced that Carpenter will be performing old and new compositions in London and Manchester, England. In February 2016, Carpenter announced a sequel to Lost Themes titled Lost Themes II, which was released on April 15 that year. He released his third studio album, titled Anthology: Movie Themes 1974–1998, on October 20, 2017.

Carpenter returned, as executive producer, co-composer, and creative consultant, on the 11th entry of the Halloween film series, titled Halloween, released in October 2018. The film is a direct sequel to Carpenter's original film, breaking the continuity of earlier sequels. It was his first direct involvement with the franchise since 1982's Halloween III: Season of the Witch.

=== 2020s: Halloween sequels, Toxic Commando, Suburban Screams, and Hollywood Walk of Fame ===
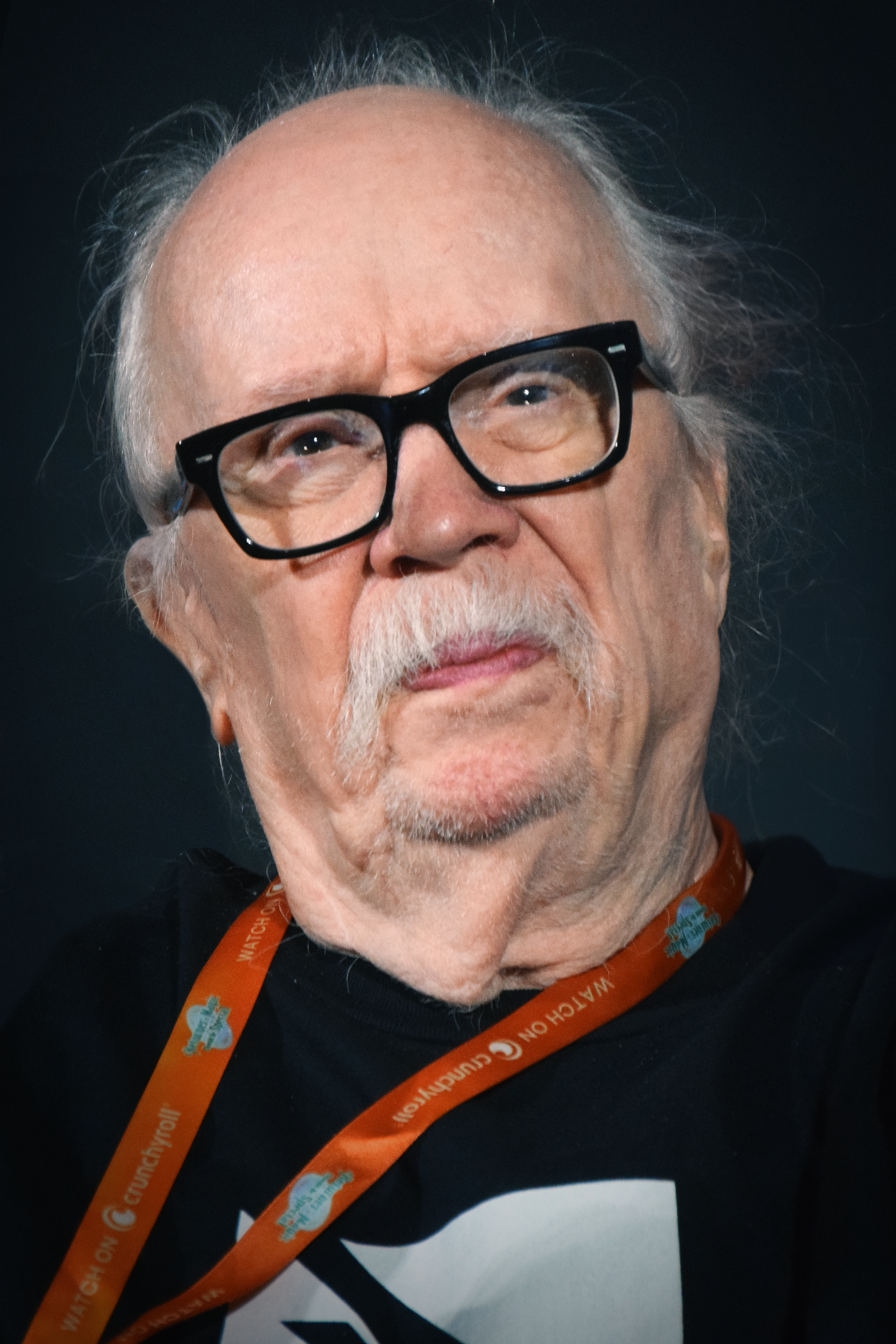
Carpenter in October 2023

Carpenter worked as a composer and executive producer on the 2021 sequel Halloween Kills and 2022's follow-up Halloween Ends.

During Summer Game Fest in June 2023, it was announced that Carpenter was collaborating with Focus Entertainment and Saber Interactive on the zombie first-person shooter video game John Carpenter's Toxic Commando. The game was released on March 12, 2026, on PlayStation 5, Xbox Series X/S, and Windows via Steam and the Epic Games Store. Carpenter worked on the game's story and also composed its musical score.

In October 2023, he directed an episode of the Peacock streaming series Suburban Screams while also composing the series theme music and serving as an executive producer.

On December 8, 2024, Carpenter received a Career Achievement Award from the Los Angeles Film Critics Association. On April 3, 2025, Carpenter received a star on the Hollywood Walk of Fame.

In October 2025, Carpenter served as an executive producer on the horror anthology series John Carpenter Presents.

Carpenter and Sandy King co-wrote Cathedral, a graphic novel released on August 4, 2026. He also wrote a tie-in soundtrack album to accompany the novel's release.

In June 2026, it was announced that Carpenter's Escape from New York was to be "reimagined" after decades of projects aiming to remake it. It is set to directed by Zack Snyder and with Carpenter as executive producer.

== Style and influences ==
Carpenter's films are characterized by minimalist lighting and photography, panoramic shots, use of steadicam, and scores he usually composes himself. With a few exceptions, (Note: Someone's Watching Me!, Elvis, The Thing, Starman, Memoirs of an Invisible Man, and The Ward.) he has scored all of his films (some of which he co-scored), most famously the themes from Halloween and Assault on Precinct 13. His music is generally synthesized with accompaniment from piano and atmospherics.

Carpenter is known for his widescreen shot compositions and is an outspoken proponent of Panavision anamorphic cinematography. With some exceptions, (Note: Dark Star and The Ward.) all of his films were shot in Panavision anamorphic format with a 2.39:1 aspect ratio, generally favoring wider focal lengths. The Ward was filmed in Super 35, the first time Carpenter has ever used that system. He has stated that he feels the 35 mm Panavision anamorphic format is "the best movie system there is" and prefers it to both digital and 3D.

== Film music and solo records ==
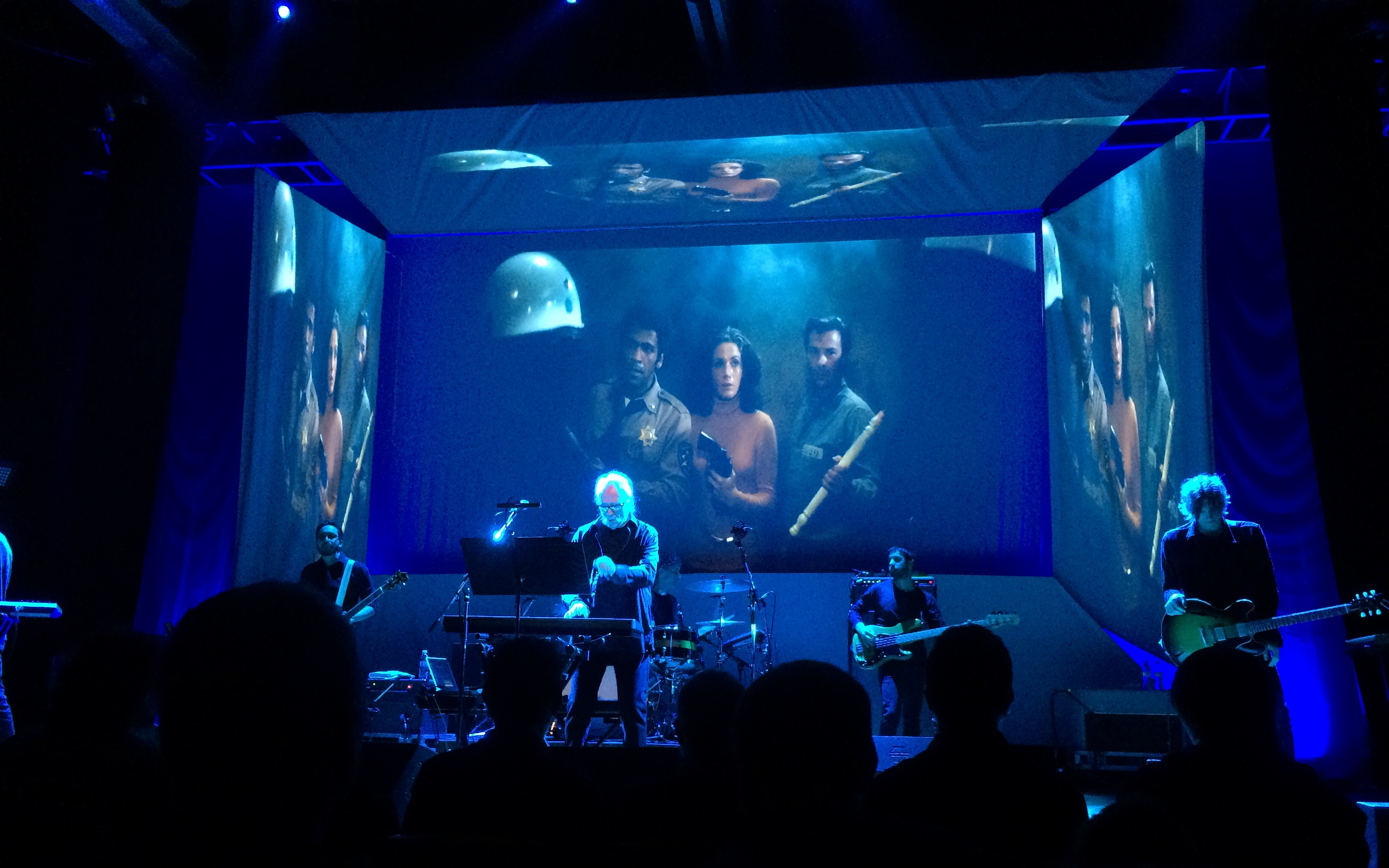
Carpenter performing live in October 2016

In a 2016 interview, Carpenter stated that it was his father's work as a music teacher that first sparked an interest in him to make music. This interest was to play a major role in his later career: he composed the music to most of his films, and the soundtrack to many of those became "cult" items for record collectors. A 21st-Century revival of his music is due in no small amount to the Death Waltz record company, which reissued several of his soundtracks, including Escape from New York, Halloween II, Halloween III: Season of the Witch, Assault on Precinct 13, They Live, Prince of Darkness, and The Fog.

Carpenter was an early adopter of synthesizers, since his film debut Dark Star, when he used an EMS VCS3 synth. His soundtracks went on to influence electronic artists who followed, but Carpenter himself admitted he had no particular interest in synthesizers other than that they provided a means to "sound big with just a keyboard". For many years he worked in partnership with musician Alan Howarth, who would realize his vision by working on the more technical aspects of recording, allowing Carpenter to focus on writing the music.

The renewed interest in John Carpenter's music thanks to the Death Waltz reissues and Lost Themes albums prompted him to, for the first time ever, tour as a musician. As of 2016, Carpenter was more focused on his music career than filmmaking, although he was involved in 2018's Halloween reboot, and its sequels.

Carpenter narrates the documentary film The Rise of the Synths, which explores the origins and growth of the synthwave genre, and features numerous interviews with synthwave artists who cite him and other electronic pioneers such as Vangelis, Giorgio Moroder and Tangerine Dream as significant influences. The retro-1980s synthwave band Gunship are featured in the film; Carpenter narrated the opening to their track entitled "Tech Noir".

Carpenter is featured on the track "Destructive Field" on his godson Daniel Davies' album Signals, released February 28, 2020.

His third solo album Lost Themes III: Alive After Death was launched on February 2, 2021. A new (digital) single was released on October 27, 2020, titled Weeping Ghost, followed in December 2020 by another new track from the forthcoming album, titled The Dead Walk. Two tracks that also appear on the album, Skeleton and Unclear Spirit, were released in July 2020. On the album, Carpenter collaborated again with his son Cody and his godson Daniel Davies. In August 2023, a fifth collaboration with Cody Carpenter and Daniel Davies was announced for Sacred Bones Records, titled Anthology II: Movie Themes 1976–1988, and was released on October 6, 2023.

A fourth Lost Themes album was announced in March 2024, subtitled "Noir". It was again recorded in collaboration with Cody Carpenter and Daniel Davies. It was released on May 3 on Sacred Bones Records. The album was preceded by the single and official video "My Name is Death".

Carpenter is widely credited as the pioneer of modern horror synth, defining the genre's sound in the late 1970s and 1980s with minimalistic, pulsating electronic scores for films. His low-budget approach used repetitive, cold synthesizer melodies to create intense atmospheric dread.

== Personal life ==
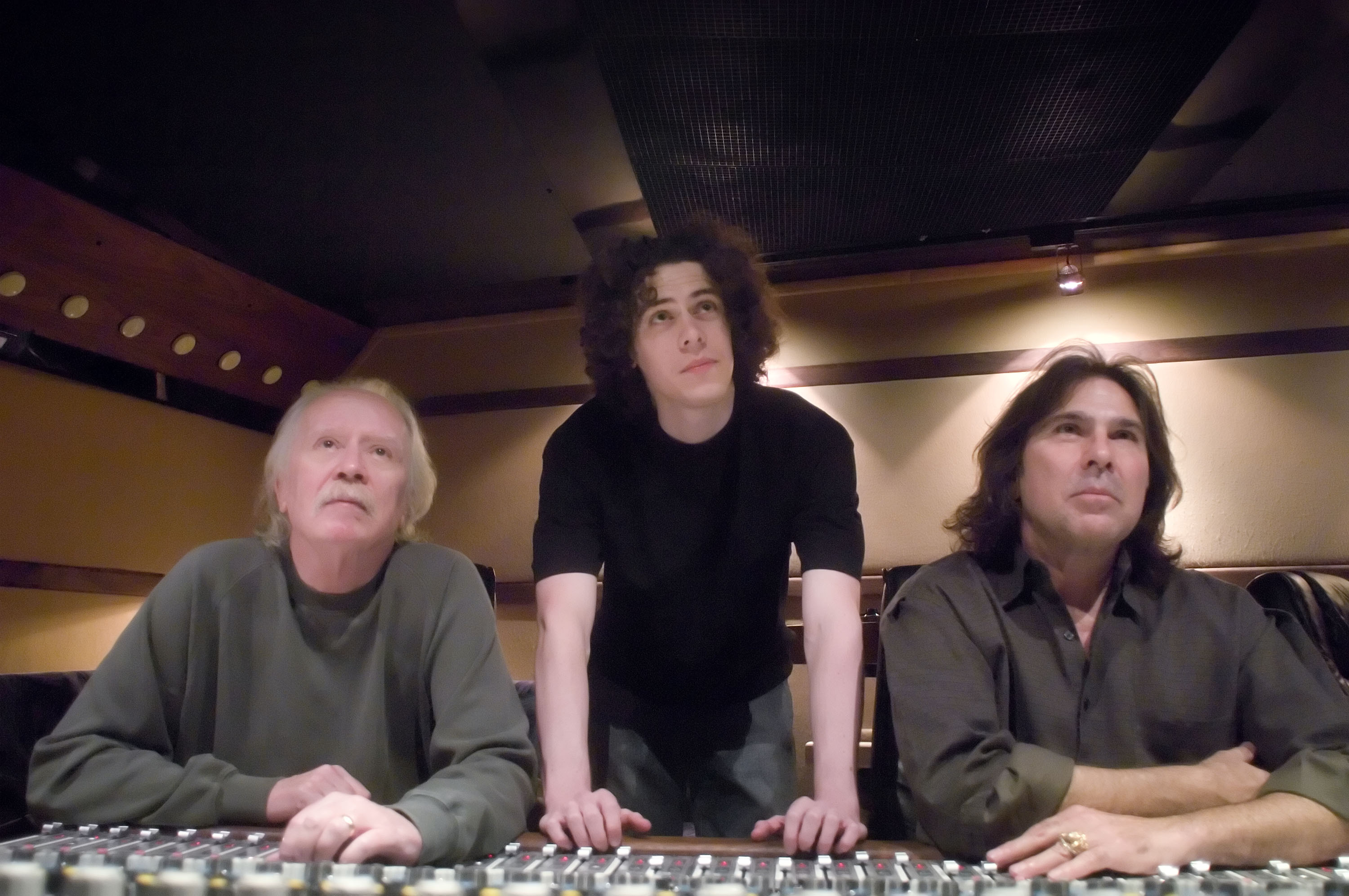
Carpenter with his son Cody Carpenter (middle) and musician Bruce Robb (right) in November 2005

Carpenter met actress Adrienne Barbeau on the set of his television film Someone's Watching Me! (1978). They married on January 1, 1979, and divorced in 1984. During their marriage, she appeared in his films: The Thing (as the voice of Chess Wizard, the chess computer used by MacReady), The Fog and Escape from New York. They have one son, Cody Carpenter (born May 7, 1984), who became a musician and composer. Cody's godfather is English-American musician Daniel Davies, whose own godfather is Carpenter.

In 1986, Tommy Lee Wallace performed the title song of Carpenter's film Big Trouble in Little China as part of the band The Coup de Villes, alongside Carpenter and another director friend, Nick Castle.

Carpenter married film producer Sandy King in 1990. She produced his films In the Mouth of Madness, Village of the Damned, Vampires, and Ghosts of Mars. She was earlier the script supervisor for Starman, Big Trouble in Little China, Prince of Darkness, and They Live, as well as an associate producer of the latter. She co-created (with Thomas Ian Griffith) the comic book series Asylum, with which Carpenter is involved.

In an episode of Animal Planet's Animal Icons titled "It Came from Japan", Carpenter discussed his admiration for the original Godzilla film. He also appreciates video games as art, and particularly likes the Sonic the Hedgehog games Sonic Unleashed and Sonic Mania, as well as the F.E.A.R. series. He offered to narrate and help direct the cinematics for F.E.A.R. 3, ultimately serving as the game's narrator and consulting on its storyline. He has also praised video games such as Jak and Daxter: The Precursor Legacy and Fallout 76. He has also expressed an interest in making a film based on Dead Space.

Carpenter has called his political views "inconsistent" and has said that he is against authority figures while also in favor of big government, admitting that this set of views "doesn't make any sense". When asked if he considered himself a libertarian-liberal, he simply responded "kinda". He has been an outspoken critic of Donald Trump and has blamed modern problems in the United States on unrestrained capitalism.

Carpenter holds a commercial pilot's license and flies helicopters. He has included helicopters in his films, many of which feature him in a cameo role as a pilot.

== Legacy ==
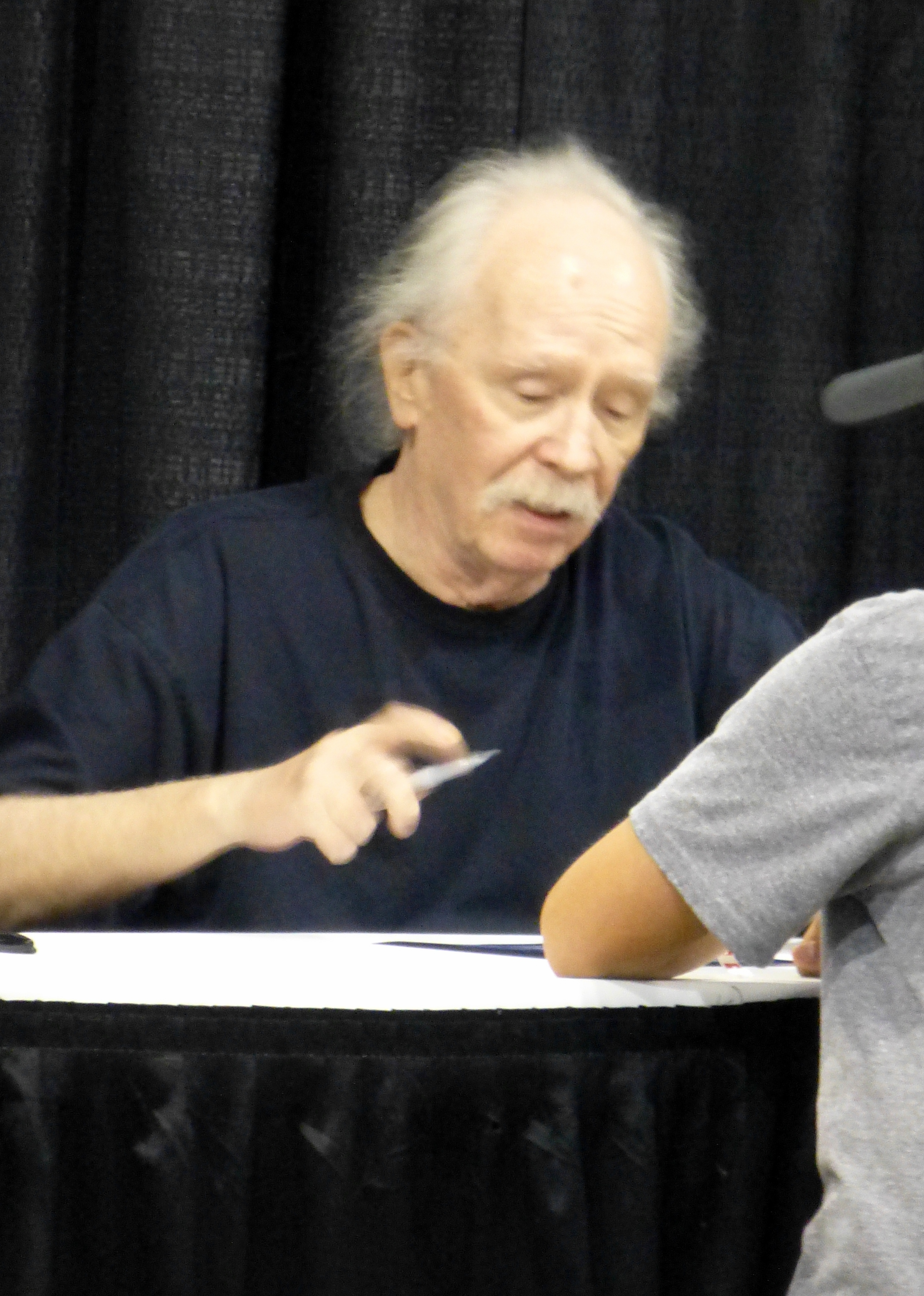
Carpenter at a signing in Chicago, 2014

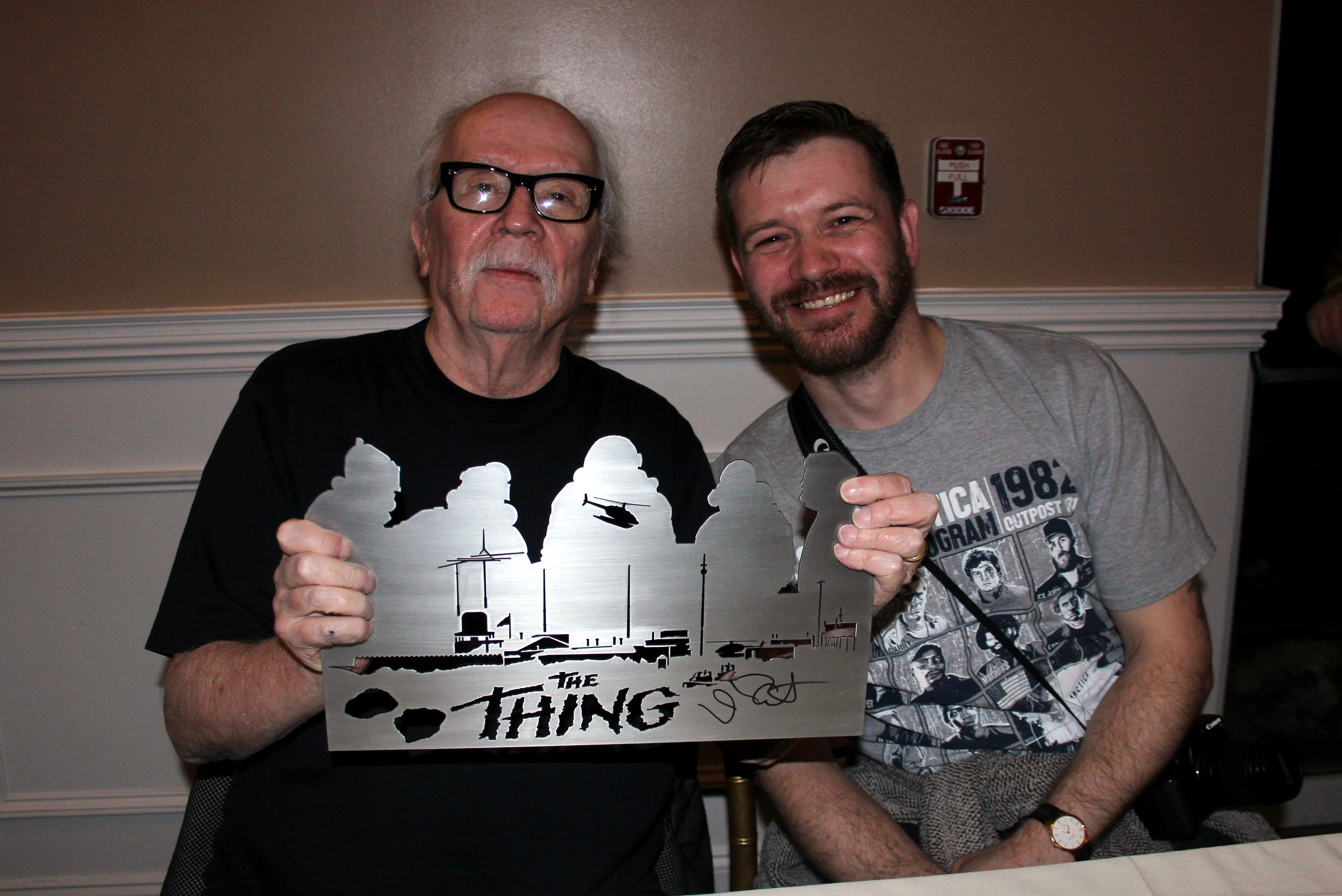
Carpenter signing steel artwork for a fan in Philadelphia, 2018

Many of Carpenter's films have been re-released on DVD as special editions with numerous bonus features. Examples of such are: the collector's editions of Halloween, Escape from New York, Christine, The Thing, Assault on Precinct 13, Big Trouble In Little China, and The Fog. Some were re-issued with a new anamorphic widescreen transfer. In the UK, several of Carpenter's films have been released as DVD with audio commentary by Carpenter and his actors (They Live, with actor/wrestler Roddy Piper, Starman with actor Jeff Bridges, and Prince of Darkness with actor Peter Jason).

Carpenter is the subject of the documentary film John Carpenter: The Man and His Movies, and American Cinematheque's 2002 retrospective of his films. Moreover, during 2006, the United States Library of Congress deemed Halloween to be "culturally significant" and selected it for preservation in the National Film Registry.

During 2010, writer and actor Mark Gatiss interviewed Carpenter about his career and films for his BBC documentary series A History of Horror. Carpenter appears in all three episodes of the series. He was also interviewed by Robert Rodriguez for his The Director's Chair series on El Rey Network.

Filmmakers that have been influenced by Carpenter include: James Cameron, Quentin Tarantino, Guillermo del Toro, Robert Rodriguez, James Wan, Edgar Wright, Danny Boyle, Nicolas Winding Refn, Adam Wingard, Neil Marshall, Michael Dougherty, Ben Wheatley, Jeff Nichols, Bong Joon-ho, James Gunn, Mike Flanagan, David Robert Mitchell, The Duffer Brothers, Jeremy Saulnier, Trey Edward Shults, Drew Goddard, David F. Sandberg, James DeMonaco, Adam Green, Ted Geoghegan, Keith Gordon, Brian Patrick Butler, Jack Thomas Smith, and Marvin Kren. The video game Dead Space 3 is said to be influenced by Carpenter's The Thing, The Fog, and Halloween, and Carpenter has stated that he would be enthusiastic to adapt that series into a feature film. Specific films influenced by Carpenter's include Sean S. Cunningham's Friday the 13th, which was inspired by the success of Halloween, Tarantino's The Hateful Eight, which was heavily influenced by The Thing, Wingard's The Guest, which was inspired by Michael Myers and influenced by Halloween III: Season of the Witch's music, Nichols' Midnight Special, which is said to have used Starman as a reference point, and Kren's Blood Glacier, which is said to be a homage to or recreation of The Thing.

Hans Zimmer cited Carpenter as an influence on his compositions. The 2016 film The Void is considered by many critics and fans to be heavily influenced by several of Carpenter's films.

French avant-folk band Natural Snow Buildings named one of their many 2006 releases after Carpenter.

== Filmography ==
Directed features
Year	Title	Distributor
1974	Dark Star	Bryanston Distributing Company
1976	Assault on Precinct 13	Turtle Releasing Organization
1978	Halloween	Compass International Pictures/Aquarius Releasing
1978	Someone's Watching Me!	Warner Bros. Television
1979	Elvis	Dick Clark Productions
1980	The Fog	AVCO Embassy Pictures
1981	Escape from New York	AVCO Embassy Pictures
1982	The Thing	Universal Pictures
1983	Christine	Columbia Pictures
1984	Starman	Columbia Pictures
1986	Big Trouble in Little China	20th Century Fox
1987	Prince of Darkness	Universal Pictures/Carolco Pictures
1988	They Live	Universal Pictures/Carolco Pictures
1992	Memoirs of an Invisible Man	Warner Bros.
1993	Body Bags	187 Corp./Showtime Networks
1994	In the Mouth of Madness	New Line Cinema
1995	Village of the Damned	Universal Pictures
1996	Escape from L.A.	Paramount Pictures
1998	Vampires	Sony Pictures Releasing/Columbia Pictures
2001	Ghosts of Mars	Sony Pictures Releasing/Screen Gems
2010	The Ward	ARC Entertainment/XLrator Media

=== Recurring collaborators ===
Work Collaborator	1974	1976	1978		1979	1980	1981	1982	1983	1984	1986	1987	1988	1992	1993	1994	1995	1996	1998	2001	2010	—N/a
Work Collaborator	Dark Star	Assault on Precinct 13	Halloween	Someone's Watching Me!	Elvis	The Fog	Escape from New York	The Thing	Christine	Starman	Big Trouble in Little China	Prince of Darkness	They Live	Memoirs of an Invisible Man	Body Bags	In the Mouth of Madness	Village of the Damned	Escape from L.A.	Vampires	Ghosts of Mars	The Ward	Total
Tom Atkins						X mark	X mark															2
Adrienne Barbeau				X mark		X mark	X mark	(voice)														4
Robert Carradine															X mark			X mark		X mark		3
Nick Castle	X mark		X mark				X mark											X mark				4
Dean Cundey			X mark			X mark	X mark	X mark			X mark											5
Jamie Lee Curtis			X mark			X mark	(voice)															3
Charles Cyphers		X mark	X mark	X mark	X mark	X mark	X mark															6
Keith David								X mark					X mark									2
George Buck Flower						X mark	X mark			X mark			X mark		X mark		X mark					6
Pam Grier																		X mark		X mark		2
Marjean Holden																			X mark	X mark		2
Alan Howarth							X mark		X mark		X mark	X mark	X mark									5
Jeff Imada											X mark		X mark					X mark				3
Peter Jason												X mark	X mark		X mark	X mark	X mark	X mark		X mark		7
Gary B. Kibbe												X mark	X mark		X mark	X mark	X mark	X mark	X mark	X mark		8
Al Leong											X mark		X mark					X mark				3
Nancy Loomis		X mark	X mark			X mark																3
Sam Neill														X mark		X mark						2
Robert Phalen			X mark	X mark						X mark												3
Donald Pleasence			X mark				X mark					X mark										3
Marion Rothman									X mark	X mark				X mark								3
Kurt Russell					X mark		X mark	X mark			X mark							X mark				5
Harry Dean Stanton							X mark		X mark													2
Cary-Hiroyuki Tagawa											X mark								X mark			2
Shirley Walker														X mark				X mark				2
Tommy Lee Wallace			X mark			X mark																2
Victor Wong											X mark	X mark										2
Dennis Dun											X mark	X mark										2
Frank Doubleday		X mark					X mark															2

== Discography ==
=== Albums ===
Year	Title	Notes
1979	Halloween	soundtrack to the 1978 film
1980	Dark Star	soundtrack to the 1974 film
1981	Escape from New York	soundtrack to the 1981 film, with Alan Howarth
1981	Halloween II	soundtrack to the 1981 film, with Alan Howarth
1982	Halloween III: Season of the Witch	soundtrack to the 1982 film, with Alan Howarth
1984	The Fog	soundtrack to the 1980 film
1986	Big Trouble in Little China	soundtrack to the 1986 film, with Alan Howarth
1987	Prince of Darkness	soundtrack to the 1987 film, with Alan Howarth
1988	They Live	soundtrack to the 1988 film, with Alan Howarth
1989	Christine	soundtrack to the 1983 film, with Alan Howarth
1993	Body Bags	soundtrack to the 1993 TV movie, with Jim Lang
1995	In the Mouth of Madness	soundtrack to the 1994 film, with Jim Lang
1995	Village of the Damned	soundtrack to the 1995 film, with Dave Davies
1996	Escape from L.A.	soundtrack to the 1996 film, with Shirley Walker
1998	Vampires	soundtrack to the 1998 film
2001	Ghosts of Mars	soundtrack to the 2001 film
2003	Assault on Precinct 13	soundtrack to the 1976 film
2015	Lost Themes	co-written with session musicians Cody Carpenter & Daniel Davies
2016	Lost Themes II	co-written with session musicians Cody Carpenter & Daniel Davies
2018	Halloween	soundtrack to the 2018 film, with Cody Carpenter & Daniel Davies
2021	Lost Themes III: Alive After Death	co-written with session musicians Cody Carpenter & Daniel Davies
2021	Halloween Kills	soundtrack to the 2021 film, with Cody Carpenter & Daniel Davies
2022	Firestarter	soundtrack to the 2022 film, with Cody Carpenter & Daniel Davies
2022	Halloween Ends	soundtrack to the 2022 film, with Cody Carpenter & Daniel Davies
2024	Lost Themes IV: Noir	co-written with session musicians Cody Carpenter & Daniel Davies
2025	Lost Themes: 10th Anniversary Expanded Edition	co-written with session musicians Cody Carpenter & Daniel Davies
2026	Cathedral	soundtrack tie-in for the graphic novel of the same name

=== Remix albums ===
Year	Title	Notes
2015	Lost Themes Remixed	Remixes of Lost Themes

=== EPs ===
Year	Title	Notes
2016	Classic Themes Redux EP	Followed by Anthology: Movie Themes 1974–1998
2020	Lost Cues: The Thing	Newly recorded soundtrack for the 1982 film

=== Singles ===
Year	Title	Notes
2020	"Skeleton" b/w "Unclean Spirit"	non-album single

=== Compilation albums ===
Year	Title	Notes
2017	Anthology: Movie Themes 1974–1998	Rerecorded film scores, preceded in 2016 by EP Classic Themes Redux
2023	Anthology II: Movie Themes 1976–1988	

== Accolades ==
Award	Year	Category	Film(s)	Result	Ref.
London Film Festival	1978	British Film Institute award for originality and achievement of his first two films	Dark Star and Assault on Precinct 13	Won	
AFI's 100 Years...100 Thrills	2001	100 Thrills	Assault on Precinct 13	Nominated	
Cannes Film Festival	2019	Carrosse d'Or	—N/a	Honored	

== See also ==
- John Carpenter's unrealized projects

== Works cited ==
- Abrams, Simon (October 13, 2016). "The Men Who Were The Thing Look Back on a Modern Horror Classic". LA Weekly. Archived from the original on February 4, 2018.
- Anderson, K (January 19, 2015). "Directors Cuts: Top 5 John Carpenter Movies". Nerdist. Archived from the original on February 12, 2018.
- Bacle, Ariana (May 3, 2023). "Best Summer Blockbusters - No. 6, E.T.". Entertainment Weekly.
- Bauer, Erik (July 22, 2014). "John Carpenter Discusses 'The Thing': Behind the Scenes of the 1982 Horror Masterpiece". creativescreenwriting.
- Corrigan, Kalyn (October 16, 2018). "John Carpenter Movies Ranked from Worst to Best". Collider.
- "Empire's The 500 Greatest Movies of All Time". Empire. 2008. Archived from the original on November 5, 2013.
- Greene, Andy (October 8, 2014). "Readers' Poll: The 10 Best Horror Movies of All Time". Rolling Stone. Archived from the original on February 8, 2018.
- Kirk, Jeremy (July 13, 2011). "The 36 Things We Learned From John Carpenter's 'The Thing' Commentary Track". Film School Rejects. Archived from the original on January 31, 2018.
- Lambie, Ryan (June 26, 2017b). "Examining the critical reaction to The Thing". Den of Geek. Archived from the original on June 26, 2017.
- Lambie, Ryan (January 4, 2018a). "John Carpenter's The Thing Had An Icy Critical Reception". Den of Geek. Archived from the original on June 26, 2016.
- "1. 'The Thing' (1982) (Boston.com's Top 50 Scary Movies of All Time)". The Boston Globe. October 25, 2007. Archived from the original on October 25, 2007 – via Internet Archive.
- Leitch, Will; Grierson, Tim (September 6, 2017). "Every Stephen King Movie, Ranked From Worst to Best". Vulture.com. Archived from the original on September 6, 2017.
- Mahon, Christopher (January 16, 2018). "How John Carpenter'S The Thing Went From D-List Trash To Horror Classic". SYFY WIRE. Syfy. Archived from the original on January 17, 2018.
- Muir, John Kenneth (2013). Horror Films of the 1980s. McFarland & Company. ISBN 978-0-7864-5501-0.
- Nashawaty, Chris (June 25, 2020). "38 Years Ago Today Two of the Best Sci-Fi Films of All Time Bombed in Theaters. What Happened?". Esquire. Archived from the original on October 21, 2022.
- Nicholls, Peter (June 28, 2016). "Thing, The". The Encyclopedia of Science Fiction. Archived from the original on June 28, 2016.
- O'Neill, Phelim (October 31, 2013). "John Carpenter: 'Halloween's a very simple film'". The Telegraph.
- Paul, Zachary (June 25, 2017). "From 'Instant Junk' to 'Instant Classic' – Critical Reception of 'The Thing'". Bloody Disgusting.
- Thurman, Trace (June 25, 2017). "John Carpenter's 'The Thing' Turns 35 Today!". Bloody Disgusting.
- Zoller Seitz, Matt (October 9, 2016). "30 Minutes On: "The Thing" (1982)". RogerEbert.com.

== Bibliography ==
- Conrich, Ian, Woods, David eds (2004). The Cinema of John Carpenter: The Technique of Terror (Directors' Cuts). Wallflower Press. ISBN 1904764142.
- Hanson, Peter, Herman, Paul, Robert eds. (2010). Tales from the Script (Paperback ed.). New York, NY: HarperCollins Inc. ISBN 9780061855924.
- Muir, John, Kenneth. The Films of John Carpenter, McFarland & Company, Inc. (2005). ISBN 0786422696.
