= Sebastian Robertson =

Canadian-American writer

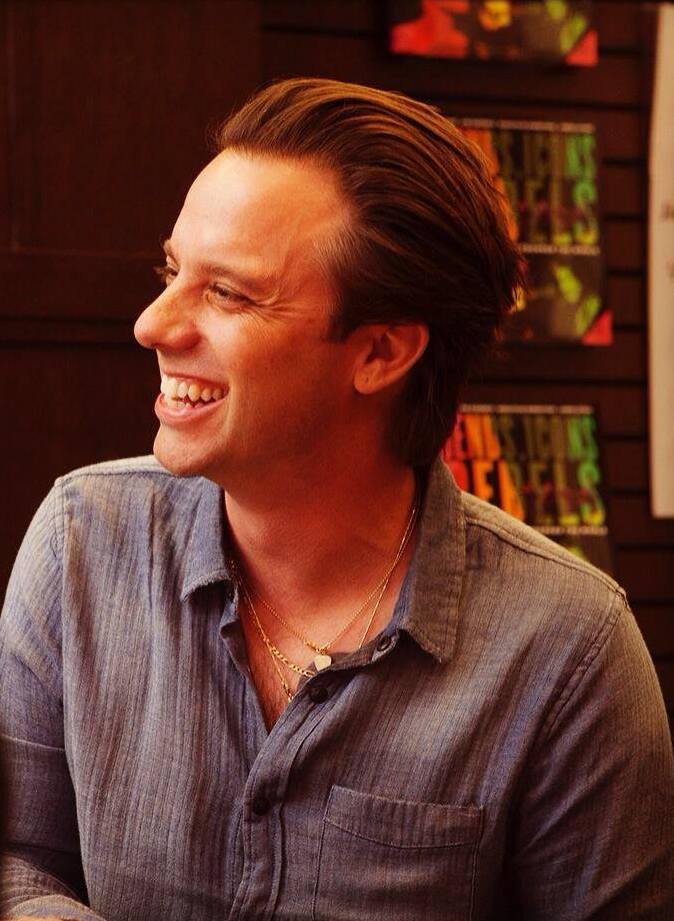
- Born: July 18, 1974 (age 52); Los Angeles, California, U.S.
- Occupations: Children's writer, film and television music producer
- Parent: Robbie Robertson (father)
- Writing career
- Subjects: Children's literature, Rock music

Sebastian Robertson (born July 18, 1974) is a Canadian-American non-fiction children's author, musician, composer, and studio engineer.

As a children's author, Robertson has written the book Rock and Roll Highway (2014), a biographical book about his father, The Band co-founder Robbie Robertson. He has also co-written Legends, Icons, and Rebels (2013), a contemporary pop and rock and roll history starter book, which he created in collaboration with Robbie Robertson, Jared Levine, and Jim Guerinot.

As a musician and composer, Robertson has composed over 4,000 pieces of music that have been used in over 100 different television shows, films, and advertisements. He has collaborated with musician Daniel Davies on several projects, including songs featured in the soundtracks of the films Sharknado 3: Oh Hell No! and The Vatican Tapes, as well as the entirety of the soundtrack to the film Condemned (all 2015).

Robertson has also performed on two of Robbie Robertson's solo albums, and was project coordinator on The Band box set Live at the Academy of Music 1971 (2013).

== Biography ==
=== Childhood ===
As a child, Robertson had little knowledge of his father Robbie Robertson's prominence, as The Band had recorded their last performance when the younger Robertson was two years old. Robertson remembers his father at the time as "the guy that made me do my homework, drove me to little league games, made me breakfast and brought me to school." It was through listening to the Peter Gabriel album Security that the younger Robertson started to connect with music on a more personal level. This led to Robertson picking albums from his father's collection to listen to, and his father telling him the stories about the artists, many of which were from the elder Robertson's personal experiences. It was in his teens that Robertson came to better understand his father's place in music history. Robertson began playing the drums at age 14 after listening to the drumming of Led Zeppelin's John Bonham.

=== Children's author ===
It was when Robertson was working a part-time job involving programming music for children that he noticed that children would respond overwhelmingly favorably when he would play music by artists such as Marvin Gaye and Johnny Cash amongst more traditional children's music. Robertson expressed to his father an interest in creating a resource that would give children a foundation in music education, and help them choose quality music. The elder Robertson discussed the idea with his friend Jared Levine, and then met music industry professional Jim Guerinot, who initiated the work of building the project. The four worked together over the course of five years to create the book, which was entitled Legends, Icons, and Rebels: Music that Changed the World.

Released by Tundra Books in 2013, Legends, Icons, and Rebels is a hardcover book with two CDs that introduces children ages nine to twelve to the stories of twenty-seven foundational contemporary music artists such as Ray Charles, Johnny Cash, Bob Dylan, Billie Holiday, and others. The book was featured as Best of the Month in Non Fiction Books by Amazon.com, and was listed as one of Rolling Stone magazine's "20 Best Music Books of 2013".

After the release of Legends, Icons, and Rebels, publisher Christy Ottaviano approached Robertson about writing a children's book about his father. Entitled Rock and Roll Highway: The Robbie Robertson Story, the book was published by Henry Holt and Co. in 2014, and tells the story of Robbie Robertson's life. The book is intended for children ages six to nine, and is illustrated with paintings by Adam Gustavson. At the end of the book, Robertson conducts a question and answer session with his father, which is intended to encourage the book's young readers to interview their own parents to learn more from them. Rock and Roll Highway received favorable reviews from Publishers Weekly, who compared it to "iconic compositions that might have been pulled from dusty album covers," and from The American Library Association's Booklist, who called it "insightful". The book received a mixed review from School Library Journal, who called the book a "well-illustrated and nicely told story," but were concerned that "the details aren't likely to resonate with the intended audience."

Robertson plans to write a third book about his Iroquois heritage. The book will highlight eight to ten influential Native American tribal chiefs.

=== Composer, musician, and studio engineer ===
Robertson's primary line of work is in composing music for television. He owns and operates a music library called "We the People", which services approximately 45 different television shows. Robertson has worked extensively providing background music for Access Hollywood and Access Hollywood Live. His work has been featured in television series such as Fresh Off the Boat, Wicked Tuna, Preachers' Daughters, Married to Jonas, and others. Robertson has composed the soundtracks for the feature films The Anna Nicole Smith Story (2007) and Walk of Shame (2014), as well as for the Matthew Cooke-directed documentary Survivors Guide to Prison (2018).

Robertson has also assisted on a number of his father's musical projects. In 1994, Robertson played drums on Robbie Robertson's soundtrack to the Barry Levinson film Jimmy Hollywood. That same year, Robertson played drums again on parts of the elder Robertson's album Music for The Native Americans. In 2011, Robertson appeared on the elder Robertson's album How to Become Clairvoyant, this time providing effects.

In 2013, Robertson was enlisted to assist in the release of The Band box set Live at the Academy of Music 1971 (2013), an expanded presentation of the source material that the live album Rock of Ages (1972) is taken from. Robertson worked on the stereo mixes of the complete New Year's Eve show that appears on discs 3 and 4 of the set alongside mixing engineer Jon Castelli. It was Robertson's idea to preserve and even highlight the imperfections and personal moments that fans of bootleg recordings enjoy, instead of mixing them out. Robertson also sourced the previously unpublished photos that were used to illustrate the album's release.

Robertson has been longtime friends with Daniel Davies, sometime member of the rock bands Year Long Disaster and CKY and son of The Kinks guitarist Dave Davies. The two have built a recording studio, and have worked together in several musical collaborations. The pair co-wrote a song for the 2008 movie The Coverup, as well as another song for the soundtrack to the horror-thriller The Vatican Tapes (2015). The latter song, entitled "Rebel Shake", was performed on the Vatican Tapes soundtrack by Robertson's and Davies' rock band The Bootleggers. Robertson's and Davies' cover version of alternative rock band The Pixies' song "Wave of Mutilation" was featured in the soundtrack to the Syfy film Sharknado 3: Oh Hell No! (also 2015). Later the same year, they scored the entirety of the Eli Morgan Gesner-directed film Condemned over the course of a three-week period. The film soundtrack album was praised by Something Else! as "inventive – to say nothing of bone-chilling."
