= Captain Voyeur =

- Directed by: John Carpenter
- Written by: John Carpenter
- Starring: Jerry Cox; Kathy Maynard; Victor Ponderosa; Jane Whiteridge; Alan Marx; Julie Wedgeworth
- Cinematography: Joanne Willens
- Edited by: Trace Johnston
- Production company: University of Southern California
- Release date: 1969
- Running time: 7 minutes
- Country: United States

Captain Voyeur was the first short film by director John Carpenter while he was a student at USC Cinema. The 7-minute film is about a bored computer worker who becomes fixated on a woman at work and follows her back to her home. The film remained in the USC's Hugh M. Hefner Moving Image Archive until 2011, when it was rediscovered by archivist Dino Everett. The film is notable because it includes several elements that would appear in Carpenter's later horror film, Halloween. Everett says that the similarities include a striking resemblance between the lead actresses.

The film was selected in 2011 for preservation by the National Film Preservation Foundation because of its historical significance in showing Carpenter's development as a filmmaker.
