= Halloween II (1981 soundtrack) =

Soundtrack album by John Carpenter & Alan Howarth
- Released: 1981
- Genres: Electronic; film score
- Length: 30:54 (original release); 70:28 (2009 release)
- Labels: Varèse Sarabande (original release); Alan Howarth Incorporated (2009 release)
- Producer: Alan Howarth

John Carpenter chronology
Escape from New York (1981)	Halloween II (1981)	Halloween III: Season of the Witch (1982)

Alan Howarth chronology
Escape from New York (1981)	Halloween II (1981)	Halloween III: Season of the Witch (1982)

Alternative cover
- 30th Anniversary Edition

Professional ratings
Review scores
Source	Rating
AllMusic	4/5 stars

Halloween II is a soundtrack by John Carpenter and Alan Howarth for the 1981 film of the same name. It was released in 1981 through Varèse Sarabande. An expanded 30th Anniversary Edition was released in 2009 through Alan Howarth Incorporated.

== Development ==
John Carpenter composed and performed the score with Alan Howarth, who had previously been involved in Star Trek: The Motion Picture (1979), and worked with Carpenter on several projects including Escape from New York (1981), Halloween III: Season of the Witch (1982), Christine (1983), and Prince of Darkness (1987). The film's score was a variation of Carpenter compositions from Halloween, particularly the main theme's familiar piano melody played in a compound 5/4 time rhythm. The score was performed on a synthesizer organ rather than a piano. The film featured the song "Mr. Sandman" performed by The Chordettes, which would later be featured in the opening scenes of Halloween H20: 20 Years Later.

== Track listing ==
All music is composed by John Carpenter, except as noted.

No.	Title	Writer(s)	Artist(s)	Length
1.	"Halloween Theme"			4:27
2.	"Laurie's Theme"			2:50
3.	"He Knows Where She Is!"			1:07
4.	"Laurie and Jimmy"			3:03
5.	"Still He Kills (Murder Montage)"			4:35
6.	"The Shape Enters Laurie's Room"			1:33
7.	"Mrs. Alves"			1:43
8.	"Flats In the Parking Lot"			1:25
9.	"Michael's Sister"			3:00
10.	"The Shape Stalks Again"			3:03
11.	"In the Operating Room"			1:48
12.	"Mr. Sandman"	Pat Ballard	The Chordettes	2:20
Total length:				30:54

30th Anniversary Edition
No.	Title	Writer(s)	Artist(s)	Length
1.	"Halloween II Theme"			4:30
2.	"Laurie's Theme"			2:54
3.	"He Knows Where She Is"			1:08
4.	"Laurie and Jimmy"			3:03
5.	"Still He Kills"			4:32
6.	"The Shape Enters Laurie's Room"			1:35
7.	"Mrs. Alves"			1:45
8.	"Flats In the Parking Lot"			1:27
9.	"Michael's Sister?"			3:05
10.	"The Shape Stalks Again"			3:04
11.	"Operation Room"			1:50
12.	"Mr. Sandman"	Pat Ballard	The Chordettes	2:22
13.	"Halloween II Suite A"			10:05
14.	"Halloween II Suite B"			5:04
15.	"Halloween II Suite C"			6:34
16.	"Halloween II Suite D"			3:34
17.	"Halloween II Suite E"			8:08
18.	"Halloween II Suite F"			5:10
Total length:				70:28

== Personnel ==
- John Carpenter – composition, performance
- Alan Howarth - synthesizer programming, sequencing, editing, recording, productio

== Reception ==
One reviewer for the BBC described the revised score as having "a more gothic feel." The reviewer asserted that it "doesn't sound quite as good as the original piece", but "it still remains a classic piece of music." Reviewers commented on the decision to include the song Mr. Sandman in the film, calling the selection "interesting" and "not a song you would associate with a film like this." The song worked well to "mimic Laurie's situation (sleeping a lot), [making] the once innocent sounding lyrics seem threatening in a horror film." Another critic saw the inclusion of the song as "inappropriate" and asked, "What was that about?"
