= Animal Icons =

Television series

Animal Icons (2004-2007) is a television show from Animal Planet about animals in popular culture. This program tells us about fictional animals from franchises that include Garfield, Godzilla, King Kong, Batman, Spider-Man and Bugs Bunny.

The episodes for example are:

- "It Came from Japan" - About Godzilla and all the Giant monsters of Japan
- "King Kong" - About King Kong the giant gorilla
- "Animated Animals" - About animated animals such as Bugs Bunny
- "Comic Book Creatures" - About fictional animals in comics like Batman and Spider-Man
- "Animal on Wheels" - About an auto species
- "Hollywood Horses" - About horses
- "Political Animals" - About animal symbols
- "Garfield" - About Garfield, one of the world's most famous fictional cats
- "Jaws" - About the great white shark in the Jaws movies
- "Christmas Animals" - About fictional animals during Christmas
- "Star Wars Creatures" - About fictional creatures in the Star Wars universe
- "Hollywood's Prehistoric Superstars" - About dinosaurs in movies
- "Primetime Pets" - About animals on prime time television
