= Daniel Davies (musician) =

British-American musician and composer

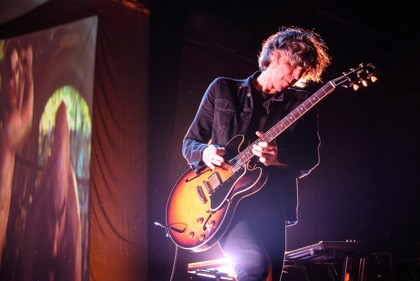
- Davies performing with John Carpenter at the Victoria Warehouse, Manchester in October 2016

Background information
- Born: London, England
- Genres: Film score; rock; electronic
- Occupations: Composer; musician; songwriter
- Instruments: Guitar; vocals; keyboards; synthesizer; drums
- Years active: 2003–present
- Labels: Volcom; Napalm; Lakeshore; Sacred Bones
- Formerly of: Year Long Disaster; Karma to Burn; CKY

Daniel Davies is a British-American composer, musician and songwriter. He is best known for his contributions to horror director John Carpenter's Lost Themes and Lost Themes II albums, and for his work with rock bands Year Long Disaster, Karma to Burn, and CKY. Davies is the son of guitarist Dave Davies of The Kinks, and the godson of John Carpenter.

== Early life ==
Davies was born in London, England to The Kinks guitar player Dave Davies and his wife Nancy. His first nine years were in part spent on the road touring with his father. Davies moved to Los Angeles, California with his parents at the age of 11. His godfather, horror director John Carpenter, helped to raise Davies during a portion of his high school years.

Davies attended Tomales High School near Inverness, California. It was during this time that Davies began learning guitar and drums, finally settling on guitar as his main instrument. Davies later graduated from Hollywood High School in Hollywood.

== Music career ==
=== With Year Long Disaster and Karma to Burn ===
Davies met Karma to Burn bass player Rich Mullins in a Hollywood grocery store in 2003. The two became friends and formed the stoner rock band Year Long Disaster with Third Eye Blind drummer Brad Hargreaves in 2004. Year Long Disaster were signed to Volcom Entertainment in 2007, and released two albums, Year long Disaster (2007) and Black Magic; All Mysteries Revealed (2010). The band toured with Motörhead, The Cult, Velvet Revolver, and Foo Fighters amongst others.

In 2009, stoner rock band Karma To Burn reunited, and in 2010 announced an American tour with Year Long Disaster. Over the course of the year, both Davies and Mullins confirmed that the two bands were merging. Davies went on to sing vocals on Karma to Burn's next albums, Appalachian Incantation (2010) and V (2011).

=== With CKY ===
In 2012, rock band CKY announced that they were hiring Davies to replace founding vocalist Deron Miller after disagreements with Miller had put the future of the band in uncertainty. Davies fronted the group as a touring member in 2012, and fronted the group again in 2015 for a performance at Amnesia Rockfest in Montebello, Quebec. The band initially stated their intentions to record with Davies as vocalist, however announced in 2016 that they would be recording a new album as a trio, presumably without Davies. On November 26, 2021, a song was released with Davies on vocals entitled “Lost in Departures”.

=== With John Carpenter ===
In 2014, Davies' godfather, director John Carpenter, began work on an album of instrumental music entitled Lost Themes. The initial work was a collaboration between Carpenter and his son Cody, but after the younger Carpenter went to Japan to teach, Carpenter brought in Davies to continue collaboration on the album, with Davies playing guitar and contributing as a songwriter and co-producer to the project. The album was released by Sacred Bones Records in 2015.

In 2016, Carpenter followed up Lost Themes with the album Lost Themes II. The album again featured Davies' contributions, as well as Cody Carpenter's. While recording the album, the trio also scored the main titles for the CBS television series Zoo. Carpenter toured to support Lost Themes II throughout 2016, with Davies as a member of his touring band.

He composed the music for the 2018 film Halloween, Halloween Kills, and the 2022 remake Firestarter, with Carpenter and his son Cody.

=== Soundtrack work ===
Davies contributed guitar work to the soundtrack of Vampires. In 2013, Davies composed the soundtrack to the Australian horror film I, Frankenstein (2014) in collaboration with ex-Filter guitarist Geno Lenardo under the name "By Maker".

Davies has contributed to several film soundtracks in collaboration with composer and author Sebastian Robertson. Davies and Robertson contributed the original track "Rebel Shake" to the film The Vatican Tapes (2015), and provided a new wave style cover of Pixies' "Wave of Mutilation" for the SyFy television film Sharknado 3: Oh Hell No! (2015). The duo also scored the Eli Morgan Gesner-directed horror film Condemned (2015).

== Discography ==
=== Year Long Disaster ===
- Year Long Disaster EP (2006)
- Year long Disaster (Volcom Entertainment, 2007)
- Black Magic; All Mysteries Revealed (Volcom Entertainment, 2010)

=== Karma to Burn ===
- Appalachian Incantation (Napalm Records, 2010)
- V (Napalm Records, 2011)

=== CKY ===
- Lost in Departures (Single) (2021)

=== Solo albums ===
- Hidden Faces EP (self-released, 2011)
- Events Score (Lakeshore Records, 2018)
- Signals (Sacred Bones Records, 2020)

=== John Carpenter ===
- Lost Themes (Sacred Bones Records, 2015)
- Lost Themes Remixed (Sacred Bones Records, 2015)
- Lost Themes II (Sacred Bones Records, 2016)
- Classic Themes Redux EP (Sacred Bones Records, 2016)
- Anthology: Movie Themes 1974–1998 (Sacred Bones Records, 2017)
- Halloween (Film, 2018)
- Lost Themes III: Alive After Death (Sacred Bones Records, 2021)
- Halloween Kills (Film, 2021)
- Firestarter (Film, 2022)
- Halloween Ends (Film, 2022)
- Anthology II: Movie Themes 1976–1988 (Sacred Bones Records, 2023)
- Lost Themes IV: Noir (Sacred Bones Records, 2024)

=== Soundtrack albums ===
- I, Frankenstein soundtrack (Lakeshore Records, 2014) (as "By Maker" with Geno Lenardo)
- Condemned soundtrack (Lakeshore Records, 2015) (with Sebastian Robertson)
- Cyberpunk 2077 soundtrack (Lakeshore Records, 2020) (with Sebastian Robertson)
