= The Fog (soundtrack) =

1984 album by John Carpenter

Film score by John Carpenter
- Released: 1984
- Recorded: 1979
- Studio: Sound Arts Studio, Los Angeles, California
- Genre: Electronic; ambient; film score
- Length: 33:55 (original release); 56:15 (2000 release); 109:45 (2012 release)
- Label: Varèse Sarabande (original release); Silva Screen (2000 & 2012 releases)

John Carpenter chronology
| Halloween III: Season of the Witch (1982) | The Fog (1984) | Big Trouble in Little China (1986) |

Alternative cover
- 2000 expanded edition

Professional ratings
Review scores
| Source | Rating |
|---|---|
| AllMusic | 4.5/5 stars |

The Fog is a soundtrack album composed and performed by John Carpenter, featuring the score to the 1980 film The Fog. It was released in 1984 through Varèse Sarabande. An expanded edition was released in 2000 through Silva Screen Records, containing an extra six tracks not included on the original release (one of them being an interview with Jamie Lee Curtis). In 2012, another expanded edition was released through Silva Screen Records, containing all of the tracks from the 2000 release and all of the original score cues.

John Carpenter considers it to be one of his best scores.

== Track listing ==
All music is composed by John Carpenter.

| No. | Title | Length |
|---|---|---|
| 1. | "Matthew’s Ghost Story" | 2:45 |
| 2. | "Main Title Theme" | 5:00 |
| 3. | "Walk to the Lighthouse" | 2:40 |
| 4. | "Rocks at Drake’s Bay" | 2:24 |
| 5. | "The Fog" | 3:20 |
| 6. | "Antonio Bay" | 4:25 |
| 7. | "Tommy Tells of Ghost Ships" | 2:13 |
| 8. | "Reel 9" | 11:08 |
| Total length: | | 33:55 |

2000 expanded edition
| No. | Title | Length |
|---|---|---|
| 1. | "Prologue Narrated by John Houseman" | 2:37 |
| 2. | "Theme from 'The Fog'" | 5:09 |
| 3. | "Matthew Ghost Story" | 2:48 |
| 4. | "Walk to the Lighthouse" | 2:39 |
| 5. | "Rocks at Drake's Bay" | 2:23 |
| 6. | "The Fog" | 3:15 |
| 7. | "Antonio Bay" | 4:27 |
| 8. | "Tommy Tells of Ghost Ships" | 2:14 |
| 9. | "Reel 9" | 10:58 |
| 10. | "Main Theme – Reprise" | 1:45 |
| 11. | "The Fog Rolls In" | 2:48 |
| 12. | "Blake In the Sanctuary" | 7:45 |
| 13. | "Finale" | 1:19 |
| 14. | "Radio Interview with Jamie Lee Curtis About The Fog" | 6:08 |
| Total length: | | 56:15 |

=== 2012 expanded edition ===
The Fog

Soundtrack album by John Carpenter
- Released: October 2012
- Recorded: 1979
- Studio: Sound Arts Studio, Los Angeles, California
- Genre: Electronic; ambient; film score
- Length: 109:45
- Label: Silva Screen

Disc One
| No. | Title | Length |
|---|---|---|
| 1. | "Prologue from The Fog" | 2:36 |
| 2. | "Theme from The Fog" | 5:07 |
| 3. | "Matthew Ghost Story" | 2:47 |
| 4. | "Walk to the Lighthouse" | 2:37 |
| 5. | "Rocks at Drake's Bay" | 2:23 |
| 6. | "The Fog" | 3:14 |
| 7. | "Antonio Bay" | 4:26 |
| 8. | "Tommy Tells of Ghost Ships" | 2:13 |
| 9. | "Reel 9" | 10:56 |
| 10. | "Main Theme – Reprise" | 1:43 |
| 11. | "The Fog Rolls In" | 2:46 |
| 12. | "Blake In the Sanctuary" | 7:43 |
| 13. | "Finale" | 1:18 |
| 14. | "Radio Interview with Jamie Lee Curtis" | 6:06 |
| Total length: | | 55:55 |

Disc Two
| No. | Title | Length |
|---|---|---|
| 1. | "Ghost Story" | 4:12 |
| 2. | "The Journal" | 2:27 |
| 3. | "Seagrass Attack" | 3:57 |
| 4. | "Andy on the Beach" | 1:10 |
| 5. | "Where's the Seagrass?" | 1:07 |
| 6. | "Stevie's Lighthouse" | 1:28 |
| 7. | "Something to Show You" | 2:27 |
| 8. | "An Evil Plan" | 2:22 |
| 9. | "Weatherman" | 3:30 |
| 10. | "Walk to Lighthouse" | 2:47 |
| 11. | "Dane" | 1:41 |
| 12. | "Morgue" | 2:38 |
| 13. | "The Fog Approaches" | 2:22 |
| 14. | "Knock at the Door" | 2:14 |
| 15. | "Fog Reflection" | 1:14 |
| 16. | "Andy's In Trouble" | 2:51 |
| 17. | "The Fog Enters Town" | 7:24 |
| 18. | "Revenge" | 2:17 |
| 19. | "Number 6" | 2:41 |
| 20. | "The Fog End Credits" | 3:01 |
| Total length: | | 53:50 |

== Personnel ==
- John Carpenter – composition, performance
- Dan Wyman – synthesizer programming
- Bob Walter – music coordinator
- Jim Cypherd – recording engineer

== In Other Media ==
- German metal band The Vision Bleak covered the soundtrack's title song on their 2004 album The Deathship Has a New Captain. They titled the song "Elizabeth Dane" and overlaid the instrumental with Houseman's campfire ghost story as spoken word vocals.
