= Pro-Life (Masters of Horror) =

- Masters of Horror episode
- Episode no.: Season 2 Episode 5
- Directed by: John Carpenter
- Written by: Drew McWeeny; Rebecca Swan
- Production code: 205
- Original air date: November 24, 2006

Guest appearances
- Caitlin Wachs; Ron Perlman; Derek Mears; Emmanuelle Vaugier; Mark Feuerstein

Episode chronology
| ← Previous "Sounds Like" | Next → "Pelts" |

"Pro-Life" is the fifth episode of the second season of the American anthology television series Masters of Horror. Directed by John Carpenter, the episode stars Caitlin Wachs as a pregnant girl who seeks to abort an unborn demon within her, while her gun-toting father (Ron Perlman) tries to prevent her from doing so. The episode's score was composed by Carpenter's son Cody.

== Plot ==
Angelique (Caitlin Wachs) is taken to an abortion clinic to end her pregnancy, the product of a demonic rape. However, her father, Dwayne (Ron Perlman) who is against abortion, and three brothers set out to ensure that the baby lives, after the father is given messages from God telling him to save the baby.

In the end, Angelique gives birth to a demonic creature. The demon father (Derek Mears) rises from the ground and kills some of the staff, one of the brothers, and Dwayne (after he realizes that it was the demon who told him to save the baby). The baby is shot in the head by Angelique, as the baby recognizes her as the mother, and then the demon father, seemingly grieving over its death, goes back to Hell with the corpse.

Angelique then ends the episode by saying "God's will is done."

== Home media ==
The episode was released on DVD March 20, 2007. It is the eighteenth episode and the fourteenth episode to be released on DVD. There is also an alternate cover of the DVD that features a demon's hand ripping out of the bottom of a crib.
