= Condemned (2015 film) =

- Theatrical release poster
- Directed by: Eli Morgan Gesner
- Written by: Eli Morgan Gesner
- Produced by: Dallas Sonnier; Jack Heller; Jason Sokoloff
- Starring: Dylan Penn; Ronen Rubinstein; Genevieve Hudson-Price; Honor Titus; Lydia Hearst; Jon Abrahams; Johnny Messner; Jordan Gelber; Nick Damici
- Cinematography: Richard Henkels
- Edited by: Aaron Crozier
- Music by: Daniel Davies; Sebastian Robertson
- Production company: Caliber Media
- Distributed by: Image Entertainment
- Release dates: October 18, 2015 (Screamfest); November 13, 2015 (US)
- Running time: 83 minutes
- Country: United States
- Language: English
- Budget: $500,000

Condemned is a 2015 American horror comedy film written and directed by Eli Morgan Gesner. It stars Dylan Penn as a rich youth who moves in with her musician boyfriend (Ronen Rubinstein) at a condemned building populated by drug addicts, prostitutes, and shut-ins. After their water supply is tainted, the inhabitants become violently psychotic and attack each other. It premiered at Screamfest in October, had a limited theatrical release on November 13, 2015, and was released on VOD and DVD on January 5, 2016. It is the theatrical debut of both Gesner and Penn.

== Plot ==
Distraught over her parents' constant fighting, Maya moves in with her boyfriend, Dante, a struggling musician in New York City. Maya, who used to live in a wealthy neighborhood, is initially reluctant to even enter the condemned building in which Dante lives, but he convinces her to give it a chance. Dante explains that Shynola, the superintendent, still lives there, so it has basic plumbing and electricity service. Besides Shynola, the inhabitants include Alexa and Loki, Dante's roommates; Roxy and Big Foot, a transgender prostitute and her pimp; Tess and Vince, formerly-hip junkies; Cookie, who operates a meth lab; Gault and Murphy, death metal S&M gay fetishists; and Hoobler, a recluse nobody has met.

Although Maya gets along with most of the residents, she runs afoul of Gault, who threatens her for her naivety, which he says could bring the attention of the police and cause a raid. After Loki showers, his roommates initially believe him to be sick, but his apparent fever becomes worse, driving him to hallucinate and act erratically. Maya attempts to call the authorities for help, but when Gault objects, Dante quickly stops her, accidentally destroying her cell phone. Maya and Dante notice the other inhabitants exhibit bizarre, aggressive behavior. Years of poor plumbing have mixed together toxic chemicals, infected drug paraphernalia, and diseased human refuse, and the building's tap water now causes violent psychosis.

Cookie steps out to deliver a new batch of drugs, bolting the doors closed behind him. Two incompetent NYPD officers accidentally kill him, leaving the building's inhabitants trapped. Dante enlists Vince to help search for Loki, who has disappeared. At the same time, Alexa becomes violent, and Maya knocks out Big Foot when he attacks Roxy. After showing signs of infection, Vince stabs several people, and Tess aggressively rants about gentrification to Maya before being killed by Big Foot. As Murphy and Big Foot attack each other, Maya escapes and reunites with Dante. The two search for uninfected people to help them but encounter only more violence and mayhem as their former friends kill each other.

Murphy chases them into a bathroom, but he dies to his lover, Gault. Maya escapes through a small hole in the wall and retrieves a weapon for Dante. After fighting past Gault, Dante becomes stuck in rotted flooring and urges Maya to flee the approaching Gault. Dante falls through the floor, leaving Maya alone to confront Gault, who alternately expresses remorse and threatens to kill her. Hoobler, dressed in a hazmat suit, suddenly appears and kills Gault. As Hoobler urges Maya to contact the authorities, Loki kills him and chases her into the hole to the sewers Dante fell through.

Dante and Maya flee further into the sewers, but Dante's injured foot slows them down. Dante confronts Loki, killing him but becoming infected in the process. As he grows increasingly hostile toward Maya, she runs to a sewer grate and calls for help. The cops who accidentally killed Cookie earlier see her, and she blacks out. When she comes to, she is in a hospital. She cries out for Dante, hallucinating horrific imagery that involves the attending doctors, and they restrain her. While she struggles violently and threatens to kill them, a CDC official orders the entire block to be quarantined. As two earlier cops discuss their own heroism, Dante is seen roaming the sewers.

== Cast ==
- Dylan Penn as Maya
- Ronen Rubinstein as Dante
- Genevieve Hudson-Price as Alexa
- Honor as Loki
- Kevin Smith Kirkwood as Roxy
- Lydia Hearst as Tess
- Jon Abrahams as Vince
- Perry Yung as Cookie
- Johnny Messner as Gault
- Jordan Gelber as Big Foot
- Anthony Chisholm as Shynola
- Michael DeMello as Murphy
- Nick Damici as Hoobler
- Kea Ho as herself

== Production ==
The initial concept for the film dates back to 2006, when Gesner was working on an unrelated independent film. During a lull in production, he wrote the basic script for Condemned, then optioned it several times throughout the years. Gesner, a New York native, wanted to set his film in New York but had trouble finding a believable way to isolate his characters and make them difficult for authorities to rescue. Recalling his youth spent exploring condemned buildings, he realized he could use that as a setting. The outbreak was designed to present the characters as having retained their personalities and possibly be capable of saving. Gesner disliked how in traditional zombie films the characters were irrevocably changed into enemies and wanted to make killing loved ones more of a difficult decision. Casting did not intentionally focus on the children of celebrities. Gesner said he and Penn met with each other, unconvinced of each other's skill, but came away impressed. Gesner cited Penn's inexperience as a plus for her character, as Maya is intended to be inexperienced and out of place. Shooting began in April 2014 in New York City's Upper East Side.

In June 2020, the film's costume designer Stacy Berman told The Daily Beast that actor Johnny Messner had exposed himself to her during a costume fitting. Berman and Jack Heller went to the film's lead-producer Dallas Sonnier in an attempt to get Messner fired, to which Sonnier refused to do. Sonnier had previously been accused of downplaying on-set abuses on VFW and Satanic Panic, both films produced by Sonnier's Cinestate. Berman's assistant Samantha Hawkins and five unnamed crew members allege that Sonnier had also made actress Dylan Penn uncomfortable by asking her to remove her bra before filming a scene with Messner. Director Eli Morgan Gesner confirmed Sonnier's poor treatment of the cast and crew. Rayna Savrosa, the film's production designer, claimed her poor experience on set made her leave the film industry.

== Release ==
Condemned's world premiere took place at Screamfest on October 18, 2015. Image Entertainment gave it a limited released on November 13, 2015, and it was released on DVD on January 5, 2016.

== Reception ==
Rotten Tomatoes reports that 25% of eight surveyed critics gave the film a positive review; the average rating is 4.4/10. Metacritic rated it 14/100 based on four reviews. Geoff Berkshire of Variety called it a forgettable horror film that squanders an opportunity to make a countercultural exploitation film like the work of Frank Henenlotter or John Waters. Frank Scheck of The Hollywood Reporter called it "one of the most egregiously awful horror films in recent memory", citing the special effects as the only highlight. Noel Murray of the Los Angeles Times called it "a stylish, pointless exercise in sleaze". Chris Coffel of Bloody Disgusting rated it 2/5 stars and compared it negatively to Street Trash, saying that it "just feels gross to be gross and is in general kind of boring". Matt Boiselle of Dread Central rated it 2.5/5 stars and wrote that it may please gorehounds who are not put off by the overly odd characters. Chris Alexander wrote in Shock Till You Drop that the film's negative reception is unwarranted, as it is an amusing black comedy that is memorable for its disorienting shifts between Troma-style splatter and serious drama.
