= Cody Carpenter =

American musician and composer (born 1984)

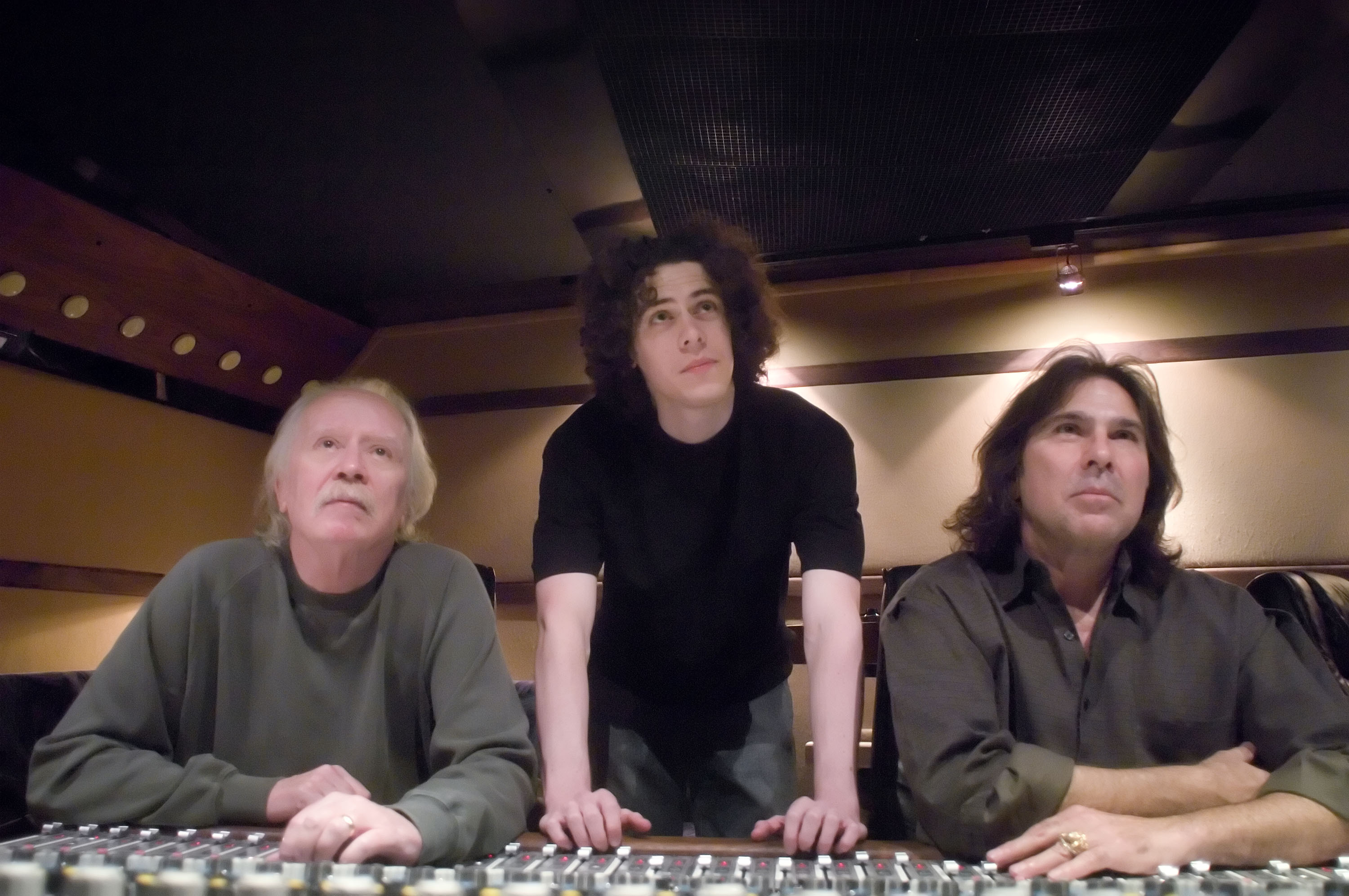
- Carpenter with his father John Carpenter (left) and musician Bruce Robb (right) in November 2005

Background information
- Born: John Cody Carpenter, Jr; May 7, 1984 (age 42); Los Angeles, California, U.S.
- Occupations: Musician; composer
- Instrument: Keyboards
- Years active: 1998–present
- Website: ludrium.com

John Cody Carpenter (born May 7, 1984) is an American musician and composer. He is the son of film director John Carpenter and actress Adrienne Barbeau. Carpenter is mostly known for his work with Daniel Davies, as well as his various solo projects.

== Early life ==
Carpenter was born on May 7, 1984, in Los Angeles, California, U.S.. He began taking piano lessons at a young age, and was always surrounded by instruments at both his mother's and father's house, who had separated shortly after his birth.

Carpenter started writing music at age 13, but admits he "didn't write anything of quality until I was into my mid-20s". He has been referred to by his middle name 'Cody' since birth to avoid confusion with his father.

== Career ==
=== With John Carpenter ===
Carpenter's first major musical contributions were to Vampires (1998) and Ghosts of Mars (2001), where he is credited as playing keyboards.

In 2005 and 2006, Carpenter composed and performed the soundtrack to both "Cigarette Burns" and "Pro-Life", John Carpenter's two episodes in Showtime's Masters of Horror anthology television series.

2015 saw the release of Lost Themes, the first musical collaboration of Carpenter, his father, and Daniel Davies. The trio continued to work together with 2016's Lost Themes II, after which they embarked on a European and North American tour, performing popular themes from John Carpenter's films and material from both Lost Themes albums. In 2017, the trio re-recorded a number of John Carpenter's best-known movie themes in for Anthology: Movie Themes 1974-1998.

In 2018, both Carpenters and Davies composed the score for Halloween (2018), and Lost Themes III in 2021. In 2022, they also composed the score for the remake Firestarter. Lost Themes IV was released in May of 2024.

=== Solo work ===
Differing from his composing work and his collaborations with his father, Carpenter's solo work falls more in the genres of progressive rock and jazz fusion, with Carpenter listing such artists as Genesis, ELP, Vince DiCola, and T-Square as major influences. Cody released a number of solo albums exclusively on Bandcamp from 2014 to 2018.

In 2018, Carpenter released his first non-Bandcamp exclusive progressive rock album on Blue Canoe Records titled Cody Carpenter's Interdependence. This was his first album in a series of Blue Canoe Records releases featuring recurring guest musicians such as Jimmy Haslip, Virgil Donati, Scott Seiver, and Jimmy Branly.

He would follow up with 2019's Force of Nature and 2020's Control, both featuring many of the same guest musicians as well as PJ D'Atri, John Konesky, and Junior Braguinha.

=== As Ludrium and other contributions ===
Carpenter also has composed music under the moniker Ludrium. His work as Ludrium leans more toward the broader genres of synthwave and synth-pop, although still retaining some of the progressive stylings of his solo works.

In 2018, Carpenter released his first album as Ludrium titled Reflections on Lakeshore Records. He followed up this album with 2019's Stargazer, released independently.

That same year, Carpenter worked with English composer Mark Day on Shadow Spirits Vol 1. 影なる霊魂, a chiptune soundtrack album of a video game that does not exist.

Carpenter performed backup keyboards for composer Vince DiCola in multiple live music performances in 2019 and 2018, playing music from DiCola's movie and video game soundtracks. Carpenter listed DiCola as one of his primary musical influences.

== Discography ==
=== Cody Carpenter solo albums ===
- Cody Carpenter's Interdependence (2018)
- Force of Nature (2019)
- Control (2020)
- Memories and Dreams (2021)
- Balance of Extremes (2022)

=== Piano solo albums ===
- Piano Improvisations: The Major Arcana (2020)

=== Compilation albums ===
==== Electronic - compilation albums ====
- Neon Sludge 2014-2018 (2018.09.25)
- Anthology II: Movie Themes 1976–1988 (Sacred Bones Records, 2023)

==== Prog rock / fusion - compilation albums ====
- Mind Over Matter 2014-2018 Vol. 1 (2018.11.14)
- Mind Over Matter 2014-2018 Vol. 2 (2018.11.21)

=== As Ludrium – synthwave / synth-pop albums ===
- Reflections (2018) – (As 'Ludrium')
- Stargazer (2019) – (As 'Ludrium')
- Alternate Universe Reimagined (2021 remastered from 2017)

=== Soundtrack albums ===
- The Legend of Ludrium (2020)

=== Collaboration albums ===
- Shadow Spirits Vol 1. 影なる霊魂 (2018) – (With Mark Day)
- The Last Flight SHMUP Tribute Song (2019) – (With Brandon Klopp)
- Lost Themes IV: Noir (2024) – (With John Carpenter and Daniel Davies)

=== TV, film, and video games ===
- Vampires (1998) – (As contributor/musician)
- Ghosts of Mars (2001) – (As contributor/musician)
- Cigarette Burns (2005)
- Pro-Life (2006)
- Condemned (2015) – (As contributor/musician)
- Tap Track Heroes (2016)
- Halloween (2018)
- Astro Aqua Kitty (2021) – (As contributor/musician)
- Halloween Kills (2021)
- Firestarter (2022)
- Halloween Ends (2022)
- Romeo is a Dead Man (2026) – (with Nobuaki Kaneko and Luby Sparks)

=== Other artist collaborations ===
- Simulakrum Lab
- Confrontational
- Ultraboss
- PJ D'Atri
- Dance With The Dead
- Beckett
- Powernerd
- Scythe Saga
- Oceanside85
- Penix
- Diamond Field
- Keith Horn
