= Sacred Bones Records =

American record label

- Founded: 2007
- Founder: Caleb Braaten
- Genre: Experimental, rock, punk rock, electronic
- Country of origin: United States
- Location: Brooklyn, New York
- Official website: www.sacredbonesrecords.com

Sacred Bones Records is an American independent record label founded in 2007 and based in Brooklyn, New York. The label has released recordings from artists including Zola Jesus, David Lynch, John Carpenter, Spellling, Blanck Mass, Crystal Stilts, Marissa Nadler, The Men, Caleb Landry Jones, Molchat Doma, DJ Muggs and The Soft Moon.

In 2011, British music magazine The Wire described the label as "one of the best American labels in recent years", and Billboard Magazine listed Sacred Bones among the 50 best indie labels in America.

In 2022, the label began reissuing records by Townes Van Zandt and Blaze Foley on 8-track.

== Label roster ==
- Alan Vega
- Amandla Stenberg
- Amen Dunes
- Anika
- Black Marble
- Blanck Mass
- Blank Dogs
- Boris
- Boy Harsher
- Caleb Landry Jones
- Chrystabell
- Crystal Stilts
- Daniel Davies
- David Lynch
- Dean Hurley
- DJ Muggs
- Föllakzoid
- The Fresh & Onlys
- Gary War
- Jenny Hval
- John Carpenter
- Hilary Woods
- The Holydrug Couple
- Indigo Sparke
- Jozef van Wissem & Jim Jarmusch
- Khanate
- Mandy, Indiana
- Maria BC
- Marissa Nadler
- The Men
- Molchat Doma
- Mort Garson
- Moon Duo
- Ora Cogan
- Pharmakon
- Pop. 1280
- Psychic Ills
- Q Lazzarus
- The Rebel
- Sextile
- The Soft Moon
- Spellling
- Thou
- Thought Gang
- Uniform
- Uniform & The Body
- Woods
- Xmal Deutschland
- Zola Jesus

== Selected reissues ==
- David Lynch: Eraserhead Original Soundtrack Recording
- Julee Cruise
- Mort Garson - Mother Earth's Plantasia
- Psychic TV
- Rose McDowall
- The Thing: Soundtrack

== See also ==
- List of record labels
