= 13 Commandments (album) =

Compilation album by Ghost
- Released: 1 December 2023
- Genres: Rock, heavy metal
- Length: 62:24
- Label: Loma Vista

Ghost chronology
Phantomime (2023)	13 Commandments (2023)	Skeletá (2025)

13 Commandments is a compilation album by Swedish rock band Ghost. It was released digitally on 1 December 2023 through Loma Vista Recordings and includes the song "Zenith", which had previously only been available on vinyl pressings of Meliora Redux.

== Overview ==
13 Commandments, a 13-track compilation album described as a greatest hits album, was released without prior announcement on 1 December 2023. The album spans material from 2012's Infestissumam to 2023's Phantomime. Its track list includes the Grammy Award for Best Metal Performance-winning "Cirice", the RIAA platinum-certified "Mary on a Cross", and the previously digitally unreleased track "Zenith", as well as the band's Grammy-nominated cover of Iron Maiden's "Phantom of the Opera", originally released on Phantomime.

== Reception ==
Writing for AllMusic, Neil Z. Yeung gave the compilation four-and-a-half out of five stars, describing it as an "expertly curated" introduction to the band's catalogue and highlighting its inclusion of songs from both Ghost's studio albums and EPs, as well as the previously hard-to-find track "Zenith".

== Track listing ==
All music is composed by Tobias Forge.

No.	Title	Writer(s)	Original album/EP	Length
1.	"Square Hammer"		Popestar	03:59
2.	"Year Zero"		Infestissumam	05:50
3.	"Mary on a Cross"		Seven Inches of Satanic Panic	04:04
4.	"Call Me Little Sunshine"		Impera	04:44
5.	"Darkness at the Heart of My Love"		Impera	04:58
6.	"Dance Macabre"		Prequelle	03:39
7.	"Rats"		Prequelle	04:21
8.	"Spillways"		Impera	03:16
9.	"Cirice"		Meliora	06:02
10.	"If You Have Ghosts"	Roky Erickson	If You Have Ghost	03:33
11.	"He Is"		Meliora	04:30
12.	"Zenith" (previously exclusive to the Meliora Redux vinyl pressings)		Meliora	06:05
13.	"Phantom of the Opera"	Steve Harris	Phantomime	07:23
Total length:				62:24
