= Adventuress Wanted =

2009 documentary film by Thomas McAlevey

- Directed by: Thomas McAlevey
- Written by: Thomas McAlevey
- Produced by: Thomas McAlevey
- Starring: Yoshiko Kino; Thomas McAlevey; Mercy Nawale
- Cinematography: Yoshiko Kino; Thomas McAlevey
- Edited by: Jean-Frédéric Axelsson; Tanya Rosenberg; Thomas McAlevey
- Music by: Thomas Almqvist
- Release date: 2009
- Running time: 85 minutes
- Country: Sweden
- Language: English

Adventuress Wanted is a documentary film starring Thomas McAlevey and Yoshiko Kino. It is written and directed by McAlevey.

== Synopsis ==
On a quest for the perfect partner, an American man chooses a Japanese woman to attempt a 30,000-mile adventure across Africa, in a beach buggy.

The film opens in Stockholm, following the life of McAlevey, who decides to recruit a female companion for the adventure. The journey begins during a blizzard – forcing the pair to drive, roofless, through a freezing Europe and over snow-covered Alps. In the Sahara desert, the buggy literally falls to pieces, paralleling the growing tribulations of Yoshiko and McAlevey’s relationship. McAlevey falls sick in Cairo and has emergency surgery. While recovering, he and Yoshiko argue and decide to give up the trip.

The Swedish press closely followed their trip to its conclusion, including the Swedish tabloid Aftonbladet, one of the larger daily newspapers in the Nordic countries, and others.

== Release ==
The film was originally screened for the public in April 2010 at the New York International Independent Film and Video Festival on July 29, 2010 in New York City. It was also screened at the Downtown Film Festival in Los Angeles in September, 2010.

== Awards ==
New York International Independent Film and Video Festival 2010 - Best Directorial Debut (Feature Documentary) to Thomas McAlevey
