= Tomsradio.com =

Interactive internet radio station

Tomsradio.com in an interactive Internet radio station developed in Sweden in 1999 and launched in 2000. A pioneer of streaming playlists, it was a forerunner of Spotify and Pandora Radio. The service was rated ‘Best in the World’ by IDG's InternetWorld in January 2002. Tomsradio disrupted the Napster scene by providing a legal personalized stream of music for user consumption. Conceived by American ex-pat and Bandit Rock founder Thomas McAlevey in Stockholm, the company was wholly owned by a small group of private investors. The service was licensed by IFPI and allowed access to over 10,000 popular songs. Before going offline in 2003 Tomsradio had more than 40,000 active users.

== Background ==
Since its inception in 1996, parent company Right Arm Productions AB explored the possibility of expanding into the Internet space. As a radio production corporation, Right Arm Productions wanted to combine the concept of traditional analog music radio with the interactive features offered on the Internet and The Company quietly focused its efforts on creating an interactive radio station. After successfully testing the technical feasibility of the concept, the company began developing the user interface that became “The Player.” Management modules for music programming, commercial placement, and text etc., were also developed. Finally, the music categories and the song library itself were created.

== The Service ==
Tomsradio.com User Interface

The site's library was saved on high-capacity servers with each song encoded with individual attributes and assigned to one or more categories. The visitor would select their favorite music categories and assign each category a value from one to ten. The Tomsradio.com program would then create and “transmit” a "narrow-casted" radio station exclusively for that user. After experiencing the station, the visitor could return at any time to their personal parameters and make changes. Users could polish and update their choices to suit their mood. They also could "delete" specific songs or artists. Users could search for their favorite songs or artists and even create their own categories, which "The Player" could then incorporate into their station. Users could create and save parameters for more than one station, and email their stations to friends. Free to the general public, Tomsradio.com was primarily commercially funded with incorporated banners, links and related product sales. At the time Tomsradio.com competed with the analog radio advertising industry through the sale of commercial air time and audio ads which were built into the framework of the station. A commercial free subscription service was under development.

== Criticism ==
Users found the Tomsradio.com interface a bit difficult to navigate. The design was described as boxy and the small buttons didn't provide an immediate idea of what they signified. Critics also noted that the player didn't give information about the artists.

The size of the music library was also a concern. Critics commented on the fact that the player didn't have access to all music.
