= Bandit Radio =

Swedish radio station

Bandit Radio or Bandit 105.5, the "Rock Home of Stockholm" was one of the first commercial broadcasting radio stations in Sweden.

It began transmitting throughout greater Stockholm on January 30, 1994.

== History ==
Bandit Radio was founded by CEO Thomas McAlevey, an American expatriate. Financial advisor Mats Grimlund and program director Gene Kraut also contributed to the company as a whole. Bandit was owned by McAlevey and a group of private investors.

Its native English speaking deejays, AOR (Album Oriented Rock) music mix, and We Suck Less attitude, all conspired to quickly achieve cult-status for the station. “Now you are informed and have only yourself to blame if you miss Bandit,” wrote Aftonbladet on April 4, 1994.

In 1996 the station was purchased by the RTL Group (previously CLT Multi Media), who changed to Swedish speaking deejays. Since then, the station has changed hands multiple times and is currently owned and operated as Bandit Rock by the Nordic Entertainment Group.

== DJs ==
The original Bandit Radio had live DJs, 24 hours per day. Among the better known were Dave Nerge (Dave in the Mornings), Gene Kraut Kathy Reilly and Tony Martin.
