= Faith (Ghost song) =

Single by Ghost

from the album Prequelle
- Released: December 20, 2018
- Genre: Heavy metal
- Length: 4:29
- Label: Loma Vista
- Songwriters: Tobias Forge; Tom Dalgety
- Producer: Tom Dalgety

Ghost singles chronology
"Dance Macabre" (2018)	"Faith" (2018)	"Kiss the Go-Goat / Mary on a Cross" (2019)

"Faith" is a song by the Swedish metal band Ghost. It was their third single off of their fourth studio album Prequelle. It peaked at number six on the Billboard Mainstream Rock Songs chart in September 2019.

== Background ==
The song title was first revealed in February 2018, and later debuted in a live setting in early May 2018, almost a month prior to its release on its respective studio album, Prequelle. A music video was released on December 20, 2018. The video consists of live performance footage from the band's North American leg of their tour "A Pale Tour Named Death", and was released to celebrate the completion of the first leg of the tour. The video was directed by Bill Yukich. The video includes footage of crowds watching the band performing the song in front of the stage backdrop that was made to look like the outside of a church, with stained glass windows showing off incarnations of Cardinal Copia and Papa Emeritus.

== Composition and themes ==
The song is an original composition, of no relation to the frequently covered George Michael song "Faith". The song contains "soaring" heavy guitar riffs and "gospel-adjacent melodies". The song is one of few that features frontman Tobias Forge on lead guitar. Forge said of his guitar-work on the track:

I can [play lead guitar] if I need to....But one thing that sort of separates my way of learning to play guitar compared to a lot of others is that I sat with my guitar and my amplifier and I played a lot to records, but I usually came up with my own stuff over them. I never learned the actual solos. So in a cock-measuring contest where it's about playing licks and playing fast techniques of others, I would definitely lose...So I've never considered myself a traditionally good fast-playing guitarist. But I can do it, especially when I'm recording. With "Faith", the solo called for an intense, aggressive part where I was like, "This needs to be aaargh!" I wanted to have that sort of attack you hear when you listen to something like Metallica’s "Hit the Lights" where after every drum thing there's this insane, quick, aggressive guitar bit. I wanted a piece like that but that sounded more evil.

Loudwire described the song as "one of the more metal moments of Prequelle, and interpreted its lyrics to be Forge's response to being taken to court by earlier members of the band in 2017, which Forge went on to win, notably with the lines "A fecal trail across the land /Although it stinks, feels, and looks identical / A pack of fools take the stand."

== Personnel ==
Credits adapted from liner notes.

- Tobias Forge – vocals (credited as "Cardinal Copia"), lead guitar
- A Group of Nameless Ghouls – rhythm guitar, bass guitar, keyboards, drums

== Charts ==
Chart (2019)	Peak position
US Rock & Alternative Airplay (Billboard)	28
