= Heritage Hunter Tour =

2012 concert tour by Mastodon and Opeth

- Tour by Mastodon and Opeth with Ghost
- Location: North America
- Associated album: The Hunter; Heritage
- Start date: April 4, 2012
- End date: May 12, 2012
- No. of shows: 31

The Heritage Hunter Tour was a joint concert tour by American sludge metal band Mastodon and Swedish progressive metal band Opeth. Opeth and Mastodon each headlined specific concerts. Ghost was the tour's opening act. Just prior to taking the stage at the May 7 stop in Maplewood, Minnesota, Opeth's Mikael Åkerfeldt suffered a head laceration requiring eight stitches, forcing the band to cancel their performance that evening. After a slight delay Mastodon took the stage and dedicated their song "The Sparrow" to Åkerfeldt and Opeth.

== Tour dates ==
Date	City	Country	Venue	Headliner
April 4, 2012	Portland	United States	State Theatre	Mastodon
April 5, 2012	Boston	United States	Orpheum Theatre	Opeth
April 6, 2012	Montreal	Canada	Métropolis	Opeth
April 7, 2012	Toronto	Canada	Sony Centre for the Performing Arts	Opeth
April 9, 2012	Philadelphia	United States	Electric Factory	Mastodon
April 10, 2012	Wallingford	United States	The Dome	Mastodon
April 11, 2012	New York City	United States	Roseland Ballroom	Mastodon
April 13, 2012	Chicago	United States	Riviera Theatre	Mastodon
April 14, 2012	Grand Rapids	United States	The Intersection	Mastodon
April 15, 2012	Pittsburgh	United States	Stage AE	Mastodon
April 16, 2012	Knoxville	United States	TN Theater	Opeth
April 18, 2012	Oklahoma City	United States	Diamond Ballroom	Mastodon
April 19, 2012	Dallas	United States	Palladium Ballroom	Opeth
April 20, 2012	San Antonio	United States	Back Stage Live	Opeth
April 21, 2012	Corpus Christi	United States	Concrete Street	Opeth
April 23, 2012	Denver	United States	Fillmore Auditorium	Opeth
April 25, 2012	Las Vegas	United States	House of Blues	Mastodon
April 26, 2012	Los Angeles	United States	Gibson Amphitheatre	Opeth
April 27, 2012	Oakland	United States	Fox Oakland Theatre	Opeth
April 28, 2012	Reno	United States	Grand Sierra Resort	Mastodon
April 30, 2012	Seattle	United States	Showbox Sodo	Opeth
May 1, 2012	Vancouver	Canada	Orpheum Theatre	Opeth
May 3, 2012	Edmonton	Canada	Edmonton Events Center	Opeth
May 4, 2012	Calgary	Canada	MacEwan Hall	Mastodon
May 5, 2012	Saskatoon	Canada	Odeon Events Centre	Opeth
May 6, 2012	Winnipeg	Canada	Burton Cummings Theatre	Opeth
May 7, 2012	Maplewood	United States	The Myth	Mastodon
May 9, 2012	Silver Spring	United States	The Fillmore Silver Spring	Mastodon
May 10, 2012	Charlotte	United States	The Fillmore Charlotte	Mastodon
May 11, 2012	Myrtle Beach	United States	House of Blues	Mastodon
May 12, 2012	Atlanta	United States	Masquerade Music Park	Mastodon

== Personnel ==
Mastodon

- Troy Sanders – Vocals, bass guitar
- Brent Hinds – Vocals, guitar
- Bill Kelliher – Guitar, backing vocals
- Brann Dailor – Vocals, drums

Opeth

- Mikael Åkerfeldt – Lead vocals, guitars
- Martín Méndez – Bass guitar
- Martin "Axe" Axenrot – Drums, percussion
- Fredrik Åkesson – Guitars, backing vocals
- Joakim Svalberg – Keyboards, synthesizer, backing vocals, percussion

With:

Ghost

- Papa Emeritus – Vocals
- Nameless Ghouls – Drums, bass guitar, two guitars, keyboards
