= Magna Carta Cartel =

Swedish alternative rock band

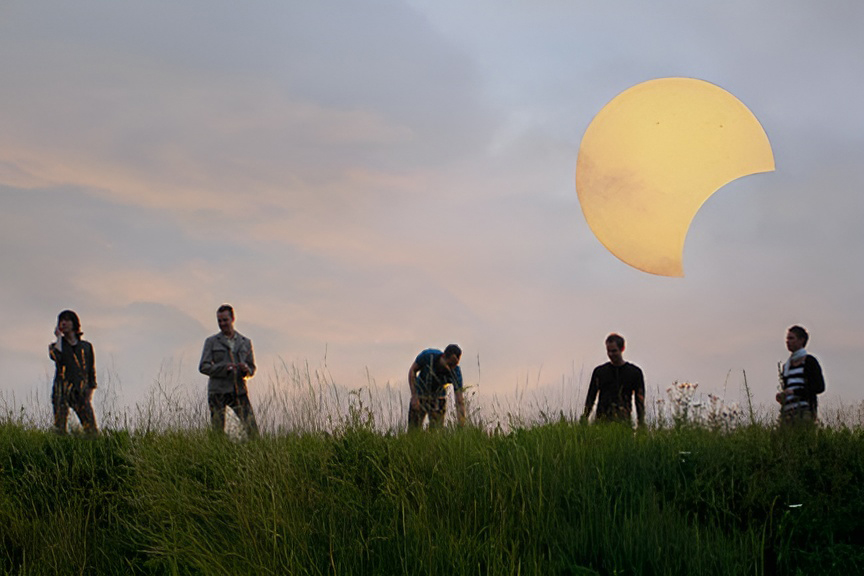
- MCC in 2010

Background information
- Also known as: MCC
- Origin: Linköping, Sweden
- Genres: Alternative rock
- Years active: 2006–2010, 2017–present
- Labels: Sounds Of Zilence, Lövely Records
- Members: Martin Persner; Arvid Persner; Pär Glendor; Niels Nielsen
- Past members: Simon Söderberg; Tobias Forge
- Website: mcc-official.com

Magna Carta Cartel (MCC) is a Swedish alternative rock band, formed in Linköping in 2006.

== History ==
The band's first EP Valiant Visions Dawn was released in 2008. In the fall of 2009 Magna Carta Cartel released their debut album Goodmorning Restrained.

In March 2017, Martin Persner revealed that for seven years he participated in the band Ghost (whose primary songwriter was Tobias Forge, a former member of MCC) under the name "Omega". Persner stated that he was retiring from Ghost and would be reviving his former band, Magna Carta Cartel. In May 2017, the band made a comeback with the release of the EP The Demon King.

In September 2018, they released the single "The Sun & The Rain".

Their second studio album The Dying Option was released on 10 June 2022. The Swedish singer Karolina Engdahl is featured on the closing track "The Dying Option" and Tobias Forge is co-writer on the tracks "Savantgarde" and "Valkyria".

== Band members ==
Members

- Martin Persner – lead vocals, guitars
- Pär Glendor – guitars, keyboards
- Arvid Persner – drums, guitars
- Niels Nielsen – guitars, keyboards

Former members

- Simon Söderberg – guitars, vocals
- Tobias Forge – guitars, bass

== Discography ==
=== Albums ===
- Goodmorning Restrained (2009)
- THE DYING OPTION (2022)

=== EPs ===
- Valiant Visions Dawn EP (2008)
- The Demon King EP (2017)
