= Phantomime (Ghost EP) =

EP by Ghost
- Released: 19 May 2023
- Genre: Hard rock; pop rock; heavy metal; pop metal; new wave
- Length: 23:52
- Label: Loma Vista
- Producer: Rich Costey

Ghost chronology
Impera (2022)	Phantomime (2023)	13 Commandments (2023)

Singles from Phantomime
- 1. "Jesus He Knows Me" Released: 9 April 2023; 2. "Phantom of the Opera" Released: 16 May 2023

Phantomime is the fourth extended play by the Swedish rock band Ghost, released on 19 May 2023 by Loma Vista Recordings. It consists of five covers, "See No Evil" by Television, "Jesus He Knows Me" by Genesis, "Hanging Around" by The Stranglers, "Phantom of the Opera" by Iron Maiden and "We Don't Need Another Hero (Thunderdome)" by Tina Turner. The songs, spanning heavy metal, new wave and sub-genres of rock, are covered in Ghost's "classic rock and stadium pop-metal" style. While the band's previous three EPs have mostly covers, Phantomime is their only releases with no original songs.

The lead single, "Jesus He Knows Me", released on 9 April 2023, and went to No. 1 on the US Mainstream Rock chart. The second and final single, "Phantom of the Opera", released 16 May. Phantomime released three days later on 19 May, and is the band's highest charting EP, reaching No. 7 on the US Billboard 200, also making the top 10 in Austria, Belgium, Finland, Switzerland and Sweden.

== Background ==
Phantomime, a five-song covers EP, was announced on 10 April 2023 as the follow-up to Ghost's chart-topping fifth studio album, Impera (2022). Its announcement solved the mystery of the band's recent "Jesus Is Coming" campaign, as referenced in the Good Friday premiere of the newest installment of the band's long-running web television series, Chapter 17: Nap Time. Lead singer Tobias Forge told NME, "Phantomime could cast a glimpse as to where I want to go with the band now." He clarified Ghost was not changing their sound to that of the artists he was covering, but that "that there are practical things in there that have inspired me to record this EP in a slightly different way than I have done previously."

Forge revealed that Phantomime was conceived as a full-length album, featuring 10 covers, intended to mirror Impera. However, due to the album's impact on him, it was reduced to an EP. He planned to cover songs by Motörhead, Misfits, and U2. He also recorded a demo for Rush's "Distant Early Warning". Forge said he chose to cover Genesis's "Jesus He Knows Me" because he felt the song's lyrics were more relevant today than they were in 1992, the year of its original release. He added: "What I'm writing about is a completely contemporary commentary on basically a movement within the free Western world who wants to flatten the Earth. This movement wants to regress the world, and just completely turn the clock back to Mediaeval times. I don't know what that's about, it's just stupidity!"

== Music and themes ==
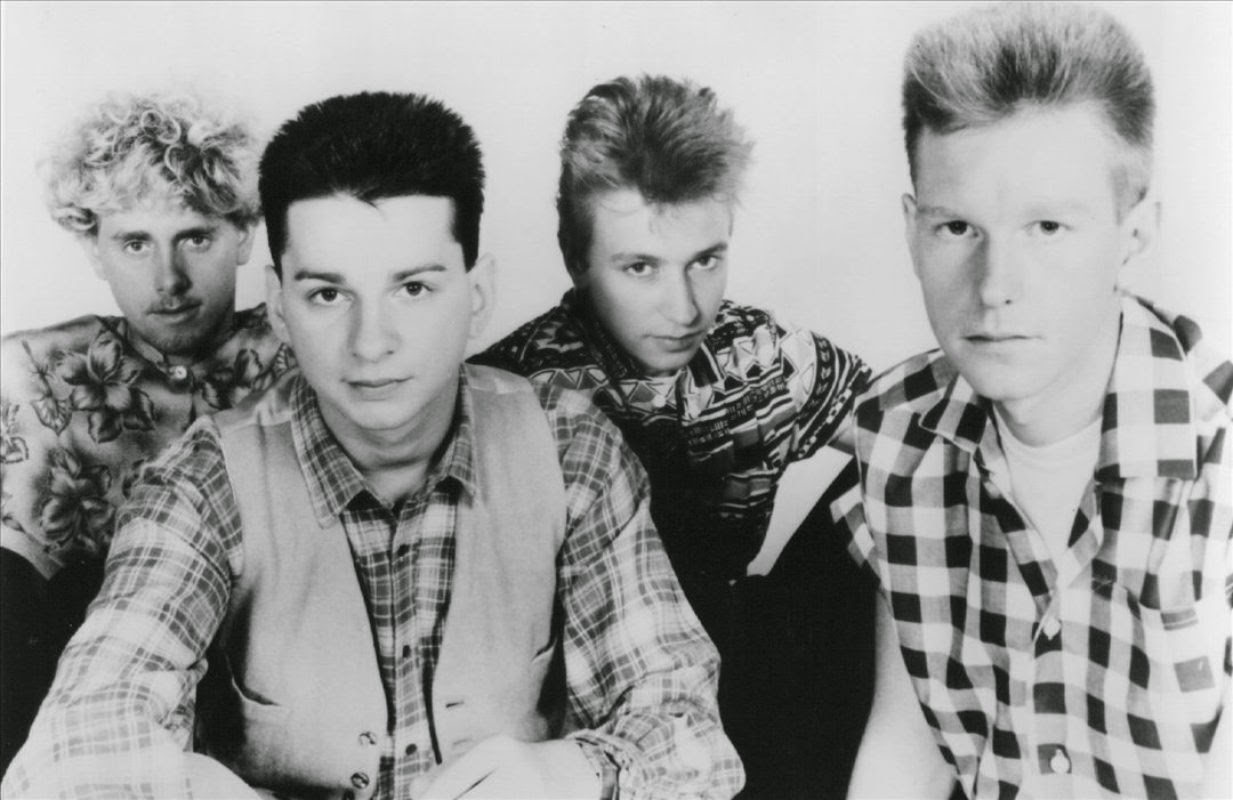
Ghost has covered many new wave artists, like Depeche Mode.

Phantomime has been described as hard rock, pop rock, heavy metal, pop metal, and new wave, with elements of shock rock. Tobias Forge's goal making the EP was to cover "five rock songs that will somehow embody, I guess" the origins of where he comes from. He clarifies that "We Don't Need Another Hero (Thunderdome)" by Tina Turner is not "necessarily a rock song," but felt it had potential with hard rock and arena rock presentation. The remaining tracks are post-punk, ("See No Evil" by Television and "Hanging Around" by The Stranglers) progressive pop ("Jesus He Knows Me" by Genesis) and heavy metal ("Phantom of the Opera" by Iron Maiden) in their original forms. "Jesus He Knows Me" has also been described as new wave, but Ghost retained this, on top of adding heavy riffing and rhythms.

The opening track, "See No Evil", is a more alternative rock cover of punk rock and new wave band, Television's song of the same name. Forge has covered new wave artists in the past, such as Echo & The Bunnymen, Depeche Mode, and Eurythmics, and while loving the band's albums, Marquee Moon (1977) and Adventure (1978), felt their production was "very, very soft." This encouraged him to do a "stand-up" version of "See No Evil" that he described as sounding like "The Rolling Stones 1982 on steroids and cocaine." While enjoying how uptempo the original "Jesus He Knows Me" is, Forge similarly feels the production is too soft and sounds like "they're playing it with flower sticks." Thus, he recorded a more energetic cover, keeping the basic components, but played in a "very, very subdued sort of way."

Forge had no complaints about the original "Hanging Around", that has a "sort of stomp" he likes, even retaining its Hammond organ, but more distorted. He considered other The Stranglers songs, but liked how it mentioned Jesus Christ, which fit with Ghost's themes of religion. Unlike the first two songs, Forge felt the original "Phantom of the Opera" was too energetic and all over the place, adding more structure in his cover. He described this as sobering the song up, contrary to "See No Evil" that he did a "drunk" version of. The closing track, "We Don't Need Another Hero (Thunderdome)", is one Forge has liked for years, but thought had missed potential. "I'm not gonna say 'better', but a more massive..." he explained.

== Release ==
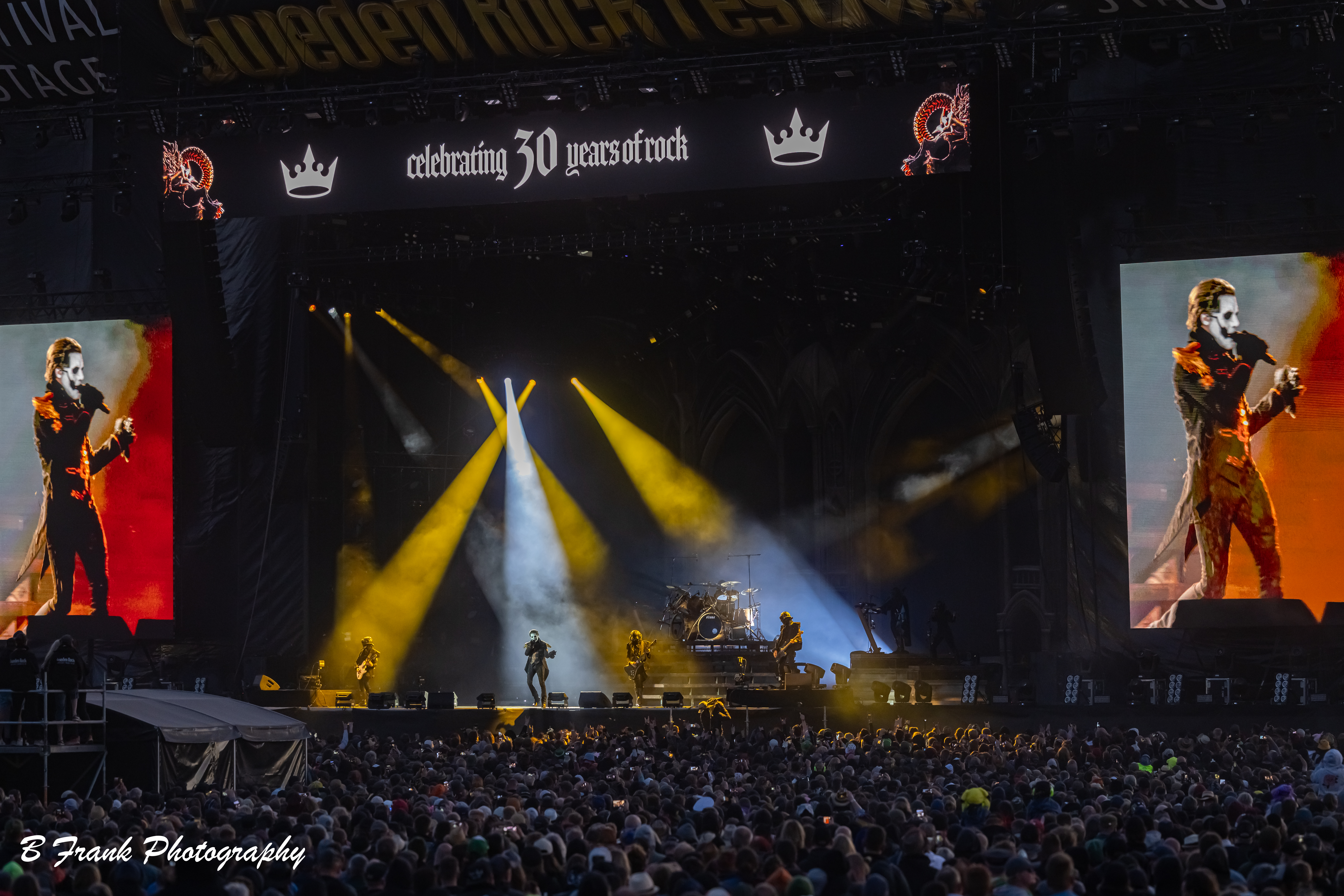
Ghost performing at Sweden Rock Festival 2023

In an interview with Revolver, Forge hinted that new music would be released before the return of Imperatour. On 7 April 2023, the band released a video on their channel hinting that something was coming, and soon after a premiere for the 9th was published. Ghost released a music video for their cover of "Jesus He Knows Me" on 9 April, an Easter Sunday. Along with the music video, the EP was officially announced for a 18 May release. The release date was later pushed back to the 19th. On 16 May the band released their cover of Iron Maiden's "Phantom of the Opera", accompanied by an official video. With the release of the EP on 19 May, the band also released a browser point-and-click game.

A second and final single, "Phantom of the Opera", was released on 16 May 2023. Three days later, Phantomime was made available on streaming, CD and vinyl. This coincided with Ghost's first live performances of 2023, starting with a May–June run of festival and headline dates in Europe, including at Sweden Rock Festival 2023, where Ghost was one of four headliners, alongside Def Leppard, Iron Maiden and Motley Crue. Ghost then returned to North America, on the "Re-Imperatour" U.S.A. 2023 summer tour with melodic death metal band Amon Amarth that lasted from August–September.

=== Artwork ===
The cover artwork, revealed on 9 April with the EP, is a biochemical take on Ghost's skeleton-faced pope. It was designed by multi-artist Hedi Xandt over a period of six weeks in 2022. He started with a 3D model, something he does no matter if the finished piece will be a print or a physical sculpture. Xandt explained in a post on Ghost's social media. "Rendering a full-fledged digital sculpture bears the opportunity to change materials, perspectives and lights at a whim – including extras like three separate face shells that can be removed to reveal the layer beneath, changing the appearance of the Phantomime," while on his Instagram, he shared worked-in-progress images of the EP cover.

== Critical reception ==
Professional ratings
Review scores
Source	Rating
AllMusic	3.5/5 stars
Blabbermouth.net	4/5 stars
Classic Rock	3.5/5 stars
Heavy Metal Webzine	3/5 stars
Sonic Perspective	8.4/10

Phantomime received generally mixed-to-positive reviews from music critics. James Christopher Monger of AllMusic noted the EP veers toward pop music of the 20th century, while "retaining enough papal shock rock weirdness to satiate their congregation. Anne Erickson of Blabbermouth.net praised the five songs, especially the organ work and backing vocals on "Hanging Around" that "somehow makes Forge's vocals take a backseat: a rare experience for Ghost," and "Phantom of the Opera" which she adds is a difficult song to cover, but Ghost pulled off "some incredible leads and duel guitar work" She concluded that fans of the original songs may find Ghost's renditions "a bit too jarring" but the band's fans "will likely find lots to appreciate."

Rich Hobson of Classic Rock described the EP as "fun" but "not entirely essential." He praised "Jesus He Knows Me" as "exhilarating" and falling "so neatly into the Ghost ouvre you'd think Tobias wrote it himself," while "We Don't Need Another Hero" is "the biggest and best" the EP has to offer, adding if Mad Max Beyond Thunderdome is ever remade "they've got a ready-made closing song right here." Hobson is less impressed with "Phantom Of The Opera" that he feels "plays things a little too straight," and "the forgettable cover" of "See No Evil". Mark Boardman of Sonic Perspective gave credit to "some interesting song choices" but concluded he will put Phantomime "in the back with stuff I rarely listen to" and anticipate their next album.

While not an album, Phantomime was ranked at number 30 on Revolver's list of the "30 best albums of 2023", being described as a mini-album that continues Ghost's excelling "when it comes to reimagining other artists' songs." They elaborate: "Papa and the Ghouls hail wide-ranging influences, putting their gleefully satanic spin on classic cuts," and conclude that "We Don't Need Another Hero" is "a bittersweet, if unintended, epitaph. Paul Brown of Wall of Sound also included the EP at number 7 on his list of the top 7 releases of 2023, as of 29 June.

== Commercial performance ==
Phantomime debuted at No. 7 on the US Billboard 200, making it Ghost's highest charting EP to date, and sold 34,000 copies in the first week. In Europe, it reached the top 10 in Austria, Belgium, Finland, Switzerland and Sweden, going to No. 1 in the latter, spending one week at No. 8 on the UK Albums Chart. In Germany, it missed out on the top 10 by one spot, peaking at No. 11. The EP was most successful in Sweden, the band's home country, with it topping the Hard Rock Albums chart (Ghost's fifth record to, after Infestissumam, Meliora, Prequelle and Impera) but also the Independent Albums and Hard Rock Albums charts in the US. Phantomime also reached No. 3 on the UK Rock & Metal Albums chart, and by 7 June 2023 had landed at No. 9 on the United World chart, with 59,000 copies sold.

=== Singles ===
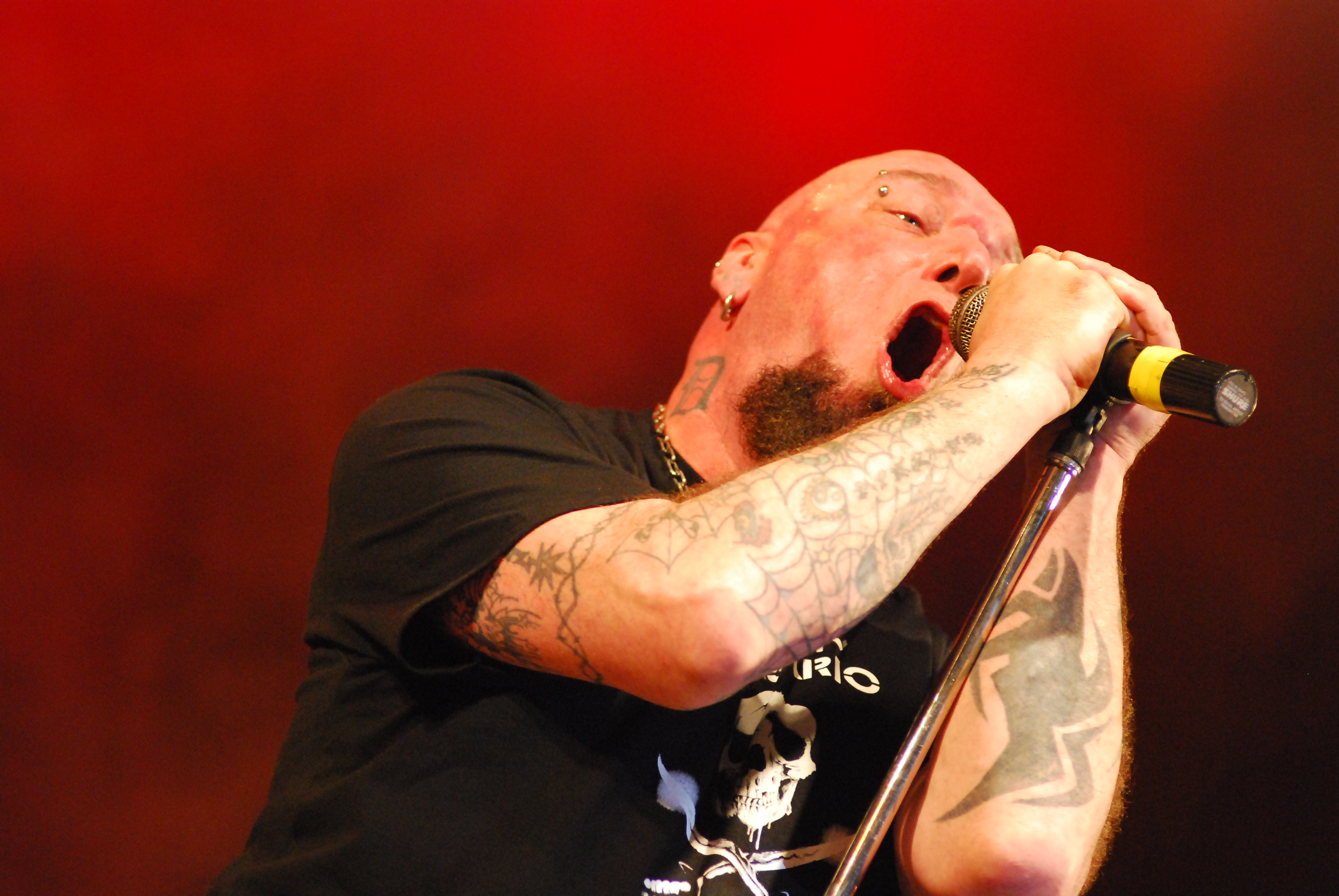
Paul Di'Anno had mixed thoughts on Ghost's cover of "Phantom of the Opera".

The lead single, "Jesus He Knows Me", was the second Ghost song in a row (the first was "Spilways") to appear on the US Mainstream Rock chart, peaking at No. 13, and staying on the chat for 27 weeks. While a better performance than Genesis' version, that peaked at No. 24, it failed to make the Billboard Hot 100, where the original had. This is similar to Sweden and the UK, with "Jesus He Knows Me" failing to make the Swedish Singellista or UK Singles chart, but peaking at No. 19 on the Swedish Heatseeker and No. 62 on the UK Singles Sales charts, respectively.

The second and final single, "Phantom of the Opera", did not appear on any major charts. Paul Di'Anno, who sang on the original in Iron Maiden, lashed out on the cover: "Everyone asking my opinion on the ghost cover of phantom well not that it matters but it fkn sucks." Di'Anno soon deleted the Facebook post. Two weeks later, he appeared on Loaded Radio, and softened on the track: "The music's great. I just don't think Tobias f---ing tried hard enough vocally. He sounds a bit plain... And he changed the lyrics slightly... That was a bit weird," Di'Anno said on Blabbermouth.net.

== Track listing ==
Phantomime track listing
No.	Title	Writer(s)	Length
1.	"See No Evil" (Television cover)	Tom Verlaine	4:04
2.	"Jesus He Knows Me" (Genesis cover)	Tony Banks; Phil Collins; Mike Rutherford	4:05
3.	"Hanging Around" (The Stranglers cover)	Hugh Cornwell; Jean-Jacques Burnel; Dave Greenfield; Jet Black	4:10
4.	"Phantom of the Opera" (Iron Maiden cover)	Steve Harris	7:23
5.	"We Don't Need Another Hero (Thunderdome)" (Tina Turner cover)	Graham Lyle; Terry Britten	4:10
Total length:			23:52

== Personnel ==
Ghost

- Papa Emeritus IV – vocals and bass
- A Group of Nameless Ghouls

Additional personnel

- Fredrik Åkesson – guitars
- Salem Al Fakir – keyboards
- Lars Johansson – guitar solo (track 4)
- Luke Reynolds – additional keyboards
- Matt Chamberlain – drums

Technical

- Rich Costey – producer, recording producer, studio personnel, mixer
- Martin Sandmark – studio personnel, recording engineer
- Jeff Citron – studio personnel, engineer, assistant mixer
- Matt Hall – studio personnel, assistant recording engineer
- Ted Jensen – studio personnel, mastering engineer
- Hedi Xandt – cover art

== Charts ==
Chart performance for Phantomime
Chart (2023)	Peak position
Austrian Albums (Ö3 Austria)	8
Belgian Albums (Ultratop Flanders)	10
Belgian Albums (Ultratop Wallonia)	10
Canadian Albums (Billboard)	15
Dutch Albums (Album Top 100)	11
Finnish Albums (Suomen virallinen lista)	6
French Albums (SNEP)	18
German Albums (Offizielle Top 100)	11
Hungarian Albums (MAHASZ)	21
Irish Albums (IRMA)	97
Scottish Albums (OCC)	3
Spanish Albums (Promusicae)	12
Swedish Albums (Sverigetopplistan)	1
Swedish Hard Rock Albums (Sverigetopplistan)	1
Swiss Albums (Schweizer Hitparade)	7
UK Albums (OCC)	8
UK Rock & Metal Albums (OCC)	3
US Billboard 200	7
US Independent Albums (Billboard)	1
US Top Hard Rock Albums (Billboard)	1
US Top Rock Albums (Billboard)	2
