= A Pale Tour Named Death =

2018–2020 concert tour by Ghost

- Tour by Ghost
- Poster for the North American leg of the tour
- Location: Asia; Australia; Europe; North America
- Associated album: Prequelle; Seven Inches of Satanic Panic
- Start date: 9 September 2018
- End date: 3 March 2020
- Legs: 13
- No. of shows: 137

Ghost concert chronology
- Rats! on the Road (2018); A Pale Tour Named Death (2018–2020); Imperatour (2022–2023)

A Pale Tour Named Death was a concert tour by the Swedish rock band Ghost in support of their fourth studio album, Prequelle. Before the tour had been announced, two arena shows in Los Angeles, California, and New York City had been announced. The official tour was announced on 11 June 2018. It began on 9 September 2018 at the Royal Albert Hall in London, England, and concluded on 3 March 2020 at the Palacio de los Deportes in Mexico City, Mexico; the latter concert was dubbed A Final Gig Named Death.

== Background ==
The tour featured lead singer Tobias Forge performing under the persona of "Cardinal Copia". Prior to the Copia persona, Ghost had been led by a succession of pope-like personas—Papa Emeritus I, Papa Emeritus II, and Papa Emeritus III—all played by Forge. For the Prequelle album, Forge took on the persona of Copia, who is portrayed as a cardinal, lowlier than the prior personas. At A Final Gig Named Death, Copia was promoted to "Papa Emeritus IV". As with previous tours, every concert on the tour saw Forge backed by a band of masked musicians known as "Nameless Ghouls".

A Pale Tour Named Death encompassed a number of legs, with concerts in North America, Europe, Australia and Japan. After the 9 September performance in London, the next show took place on 25 October 2018 at the Verizon Theatre in Grand Prairie, Texas; following the 25 August 2019 show at the Maimarktgelände exhibition site in Mannheim, Germany, it was announced that the tour would be extended into the fall, billed as The Ultimate Tour Named Death. This extension kicked off on 13 September 2019 at Bakersfield, California's Rabobank Arena, and concluded with A Final Gig Named Death.

== Tour dates ==
List of 2018 concerts
Date	City	Country	Venue	Support Act(s)
9 September 2018	London	England	Royal Albert Hall	—N/a
25 October 2018	Grand Prairie	United States	Verizon Theatre	—N/a
26 October 2018	Tulsa	United States	Cox Business Center	—N/a
27 October 2018	Kansas City	United States	Arvest Bank Theatre	—N/a
29 October 2018	Louisville	United States	Palace Theatre	—N/a
30 October 2018	Indianapolis	United States	Murat Theatre	—N/a
31 October 2018	Milwaukee	United States	Riverside Theater (Note: This show was technically not part of the A Pale Tour Named Death tour; it completed Act II of the show that was abruptly canceled halfway on 31 May 2018 during the Rats! on the Road tour when a fan collapsed at the end of Act I.)	—N/a
1 November 2018	Chicago	United States	Aragon Ballroom	—N/a
2 November 2018	Peoria	United States	Peoria Civic Center	—N/a
3 November 2018	Madison	United States	The Sylvee	—N/a
4 November 2018	Ames	United States	Stephens Auditorium	—N/a
6 November 2018	Omaha	United States	Orpheum Theater	—N/a
8 November 2018	Albuquerque	United States	Kiva Auditorium	—N/a
9 November 2018	El Paso	United States	Abraham Chavez Theatre	—N/a
10 November 2018	Phoenix	United States	Comerica Theatre	—N/a
12 November 2018	San Diego	United States	Spreckels Theatre	—N/a
13 November 2018	Sacramento	United States	Community Center Theatre	—N/a
15 November 2018	San Jose	United States	City National Civic	—N/a
16 November 2018	Inglewood	United States	The Forum	—N/a
17 November 2018	Las Vegas	United States	The Joint	—N/a
19 November 2018	Midland	United States	Wagner Noel Performing Arts Center	—N/a
20 November 2018	Austin	United States	Bass Concert Hall	—N/a
21 November 2018	New Orleans	United States	Orpheum Theater	—N/a
23 November 2018	Orlando	United States	Walt Disney Theater	—N/a
24 November 2018	Miami Beach	United States	Jackie Gleason Theater	—N/a
25 November 2018	Clearwater	United States	Ruth Eckerd Hall	—N/a
27 November 2018	North Charleston	United States	North Charleston Performing Arts Center	—N/a
29 November 2018	Mobile	United States	Saenger Theatre	—N/a
30 November 2018	Atlanta	United States	Coca-Cola Roxy	—N/a
1 December 2018	Jacksonville	United States	Florida Theatre	—N/a
2 December 2018	Charlotte	United States	Ovens Auditorium	—N/a
4 December 2018	Richmond	United States	Dominion Energy Center	—N/a
5 December 2018	Wilkes Barre	United States	F.M. Kirby Center for the Performing Arts	—N/a
7 December 2018	Laval	Canada	Place Bell	—N/a
8 December 2018	Toronto	Canada	Sony Centre for the Performing Arts	—N/a
10 December 2018	Baltimore	United States	Hippodrome Theatre	—N/a
11 December 2018	Upper Darby	United States	Tower Theater	—N/a
13 December 2018	Albany	United States	Palace Theatre	—N/a
14 December 2018	Boston	United States	Wang Theatre	—N/a
15 December 2018	Brooklyn	United States	Barclays Center	—N/a

List of 2019 concerts
Date	City	Country	Venue	Support Act(s)
3 February 2019	Lyon	France	Halle Tony Garnier	—N/a
5 February 2019	Amsterdam	Netherlands	AFAS Live	—N/a
6 February 2019	Antwerp	Belgium	Lotto Arena	—N/a
7 February 2019	Paris	France	Zénith Paris	—N/a
14 February 2019	Stuttgart	Germany	Hanns-Martin-Schleyer-Halle	—N/a
15 February 2019	Bochum	Germany	RuhrCongress	—N/a
17 February 2019	Hannover	Germany	Swiss Life Hall	—N/a
18 February 2019	Hamburg	Germany	Alsterdorfer Sporthalle	—N/a
20 February 2019	Gothenburg	Sweden	Scandinavium	—N/a
21 February 2019	Oslo	Norway	Oslo Spektrum	—N/a
23 February 2019	Stockholm	Sweden	Ericsson Globe	—N/a
6 March 2019	Brisbane	Australia	The Tivoli	—N/a
9 March 2019	Sydney	Australia	Parramatta Park (Note: Download Festival)	Various
11 March 2019	Melbourne	Australia	Flemington Racecourse (Note: Download Festival)	Various
21 March 2019	Chiba	Japan	Makuhari Messe (Note: Download Festival)	Various
1 May 2019	Lisbon	Portugal	Estádio do Restelo	Support act for: Metallica
3 May 2019	Madrid	Spain	Valdebebas	Support act for: Metallica
5 May 2019	Barcelona	Spain	Estadi Olímpic Lluís Companys	Support act for: Metallica
8 May 2019	Milan	Italy	SNAI San Siro Hippodrome	Support act for: Metallica
10 May 2019	Zürich	Switzerland	Letzigrund	Support act for: Metallica
12 May 2019	Paris	France	Stade de France	Support act for: Metallica
17 May 2019	Columbus	United States	Sonic Temple Art & Music Festival	Various
18 May 2019	Bridgeview	United States	Chicago Open Air	Various
8 June 2019	Slane	Ireland	Slane Castle	Support act for: Metallica
11 June 2019	Amsterdam	Netherlands	Johan Cruyff Arena	Support act for: Metallica
13 June 2019	Cologne	Germany	RheinEnergieStadion	Support act for: Metallica
16 June 2019	Brussels	Belgium	King Baudouin Stadium	Support act for: Metallica
18 June 2019	Manchester	England	Etihad Stadium	Support act for: Metallica
20 June 2019	London	England	Twickenham Stadium	Support act for: Metallica
6 July 2019	Berlin	Germany	Olympiastadion	Support act for: Metallica
9 July 2019	Gothenburg	Sweden	Ullevi	Support act for: Metallica
11 July 2019	Copenhagen	Denmark	Telia Parken	Support act for: Metallica
13 July 2019	Trondheim	Norway	Granåsen	Support act for: Metallica
16 July 2019	Hämeenlinna	Finland	Kantolan Tapahtumapuisto	Support act for: Metallica
18 July 2019	Tartu	Estonia	Raadi Airfield	Support act for: Metallica
21 July 2019	Moscow	Russia	Luzhniki Stadium	Support act for: Metallica
27 July 2019	Montreal	Canada	Parc Jean-Drapeau	Various
14 August 2019	Bucharest	Romania	Arena Națională	Support act for: Metallica
16 August 2019	Vienna	Austria	Ernst-Happel-Stadion	Support act for: Metallica
18 August 2019	Prague	Czech Republic	Letňany	Support act for: Metallica
21 August 2019	Warsaw	Poland	PGE Narodowy	Support act for: Metallica
23 August 2019	Munich	Germany	Olympiastadion	Support act for: Metallica
25 August 2019	Mannheim	Germany	Maimarktgelände	Support act for: Metallica
13 September 2019	Bakersfield	United States	Rabobank Arena	Nothing More
14 September 2019	Reno	United States	Reno Events Center	Nothing More
16 September 2019	Portland	United States	Theater of the Clouds at Moda Center	Nothing More
17 September 2019	Kennewick	United States	Toyota Center	Nothing More
19 September 2019	Seattle	United States	WaMu Theater	Nothing More
20 September 2019	Vancouver	Canada	Pacific Coliseum	Nothing More
21 September 2019	Penticton	Canada	South Okanagan Events Centre	Nothing More
23 September 2019	Edmonton	Canada	Rogers Place	Nothing More
24 September 2019	Calgary	Canada	Stampede Corral	Nothing More
26 September 2019	Spokane	United States	Spokane Arena	Nothing More
27 September 2019	Boise	United States	Taco Bell Arena	Nothing More
28 September 2019	West Valley City	United States	Maverik Center	Nothing More
30 September 2019	Loveland	United States	Budweiser Events Center	Nothing More
1 October 2019	Colorado Springs	United States	Broadmoor World Arena	Nothing More
3 October 2019	Sioux Falls	United States	Denny Sanford Premier Center	Nothing More
4 October 2019	Fargo	United States	Scheels Arena	Nothing More
5 October 2019	Minneapolis	United States	Armory	Nothing More
7 October 2019	Green Bay	United States	Resch Center	Nothing More
8 October 2019	Moline	United States	TaxSlayer Center	Nothing More
10 October 2019	Youngstown	United States	Covelli Centre	Nothing More
11 October 2019	Huntington	United States	Big Sandy Superstore Arena	Nothing More
12 October 2019	Manchester	United States	Great Stage Park	Various
14 October 2019	Grand Rapids	United States	DeltaPlex Arena	Nothing More
15 October 2019	Toledo	United States	Huntington Center	Nothing More
17 October 2019	Hamilton	Canada	FirstOntario Centre	Nothing More
18 October 2019	Ottawa	Canada	Canadian Tire Centre	Nothing More
19 October 2019	Portland	United States	Cross Insurance Arena	Nothing More
21 October 2019	Worcester	United States	DCU Center	Nothing More
22 October 2019	Syracuse	United States	Oncenter War Memorial Arena	Nothing More
24 October 2019	Hershey	United States	Giant Center	Nothing More
25 October 2019	Trenton	United States	CURE Insurance Arena	Nothing More
26 October 2019	Glens Falls	United States	Cool Insuring Arena	Nothing More
16 November 2019	Nottingham	England	Motorpoint Arena	All Them Witches; Tribulation
17 November 2019	Cardiff	Wales	Motorpoint Arena	All Them Witches; Tribulation
18 November 2019	Glasgow	Scotland	SSE Hydro	All Them Witches; Tribulation
20 November 2019	Dublin	Ireland	3Arena	All Them Witches; Tribulation
22 November 2019	London	England	SSE Arena	All Them Witches; Tribulation
23 November 2019	Leeds	England	First Direct Arena	All Them Witches; Tribulation
25 November 2019	Copenhagen	Denmark	Forum Copenhagen	All Them Witches; Tribulation
28 November 2019	Helsinki	Finland	Hartwall Arena	All Them Witches; Tribulation
30 November 2019	Katowice	Poland	Spodek	All Them Witches; Tribulation
1 December 2019	Prague	Czech Republic	02 Universum	All Them Witches; Tribulation
3 December 2019	Budapest	Hungary	László Papp Budapest Sports Arena	All Them Witches; Tribulation
5 December 2019	Mantua	Italy	Palabam	All Them Witches; Tribulation
8 December 2019	Barcelona	Spain	Palau Sant Jordi	All Them Witches; Tribulation
10 December 2019	Lisbon	Portugal	Altice Arena	All Them Witches; Tribulation
11 December 2019	Madrid	Spain	WiZink Center	All Them Witches; Tribulation
13 December 2019	Eckbolsheim	France	Zénith de Strasbourg	All Them Witches; Tribulation
14 December 2019	Zürich	Switzerland	Hallenstadion	All Them Witches; Tribulation
15 December 2019	Munich	Germany	Kulturhalle Zenith	All Them Witches; Tribulation
17 December 2019	Esch-sur-Alzette	Luxembourg	Rockhal	All Them Witches; Tribulation
18 December 2019	Saint-Herblain	France	Zénith de Nantes Métropole	All Them Witches; Tribulation
19 December 2019	Toulouse	France	Zénith de Toulouse	All Them Witches; Tribulation

List of 2020 concerts
Date	City	Country	Venue	Support Act(s)
3 March 2020	Mexico City	Mexico	Palacio de los Deportes (Note: Final show to feature Papa Nihil and Cardinal Copia. Papa Emeritus IV's debut show.)	—N/a

=== Box office ===
Venue	City	Attendance	Revenue
Bass Concert Hall	Austin	2,572 / 2,827 (90%)	$123,208
Wagner Noel Performing Arts Center	Midland	992 / 1,218 (81%)	$45,767
Place Bell	Laval	5,421 / 5,824 (93%)	$219,373
