= Dance Macabre (song) =

- Cover art for the August 2018 release

Single by Ghost

from the album Prequelle
- Released: May 18, 2018
- Recorded: 2018
- Genre: Hard rock; pop rock; arena rock
- Length: 3:39
- Label: Loma Vista
- Songwriters: Tobias Forge; Salem Al Fakir; Vincent Pontare
- Producer: Tom Dalgety

Ghost singles chronology
"Rats" (2018)	"Dance Macabre" (2018)	"Faith" (2019)

Music video
- "Dance Macabre" on YouTube

"Dance Macabre" is a song by the Swedish rock band Ghost. It was their second single from their fourth studio album Prequelle. It topped the Billboard Mainstream Rock Songs chart for two weeks in February 2019.

== Background ==
"Dance Macabre" is a song from Ghost's fourth studio album, Prequelle. The song was debuted in a live setting, being played live at a surprise live show on May 5, 2018. The studio version was previewed via the band's Instagram story on May 17, a day prior to being officially released. Additionally, a separate version of the song, a disco remix version, was released on August 24, 2018, done by synthwave musician Carpenter Brut. The remix had been requested by Ghost frontman Tobias Forge in April 2018, after Brut had opened for Ghost on tour in 2016.

The song was later released as the second single from Prequelle, after "Rats". In February 2019, the song topped the Billboard Mainstream Rock Songs chart for two weeks. It was the band's third consecutive song to top the chart, after "Rats" and "Square Hammer".

== Music video ==
A music video was released on October 17, 2018. It was described by Consequence of Sound as "a homage to The Rocky Horror Picture Show."

The song's music video features two men arriving at a house seeking entry to a party. One of the men is unsure, while the other is excited for the night ahead. They are questioned by a spooky man in facepaint, and then are promptly let in the house.

As the video progresses, the party grows more and more eventful while everyone is dancing. Meanwhile, one of the earlier men is seen dancing with a woman, who then bestows upon him the signature facepaint of Papa Emeritus. She then punches him in the left eye, giving him the iconic white eye as seen in the band's numerous vocalists.

== Composition and themes ==
Musically, the song was noted as having more of a "dance music" vibe than most of their work. Forge noted that when he originally wrote the song, he didn't envision it as a Ghost song, but once he started writing lyrics, he felt he could make it work as part of the album. Forge also shared the track with some "songwriter friends" of his, who encouraged him to use it as a Ghost song. Forge was inspired by the music diversity that Queen would have with their albums, feeling that Ghost could similarly use some diversity. Lyrically, the song is about the Black Plague – a theme across the entire Prequelle album – specifically about how people would literally dance and party until they died to cope with the illness.

Europe was in this turmoil in the late 1340s. The plague is extremely fast. It starts off as the worst flu you've ever had and then it just goes worse and then you're dead after three days. So people were lying in the streets – corpses and all the surroundings were just falling apart. All the brothels and pubs were thriving because people started partying literally like there was no tomorrow because they were gonna die. They were just going for it. "Dance Macabre" is capturing that joyous nocturnal sort of life in a disco song.

== Reception ==
Metal Injection identified the song as the standout track on Prequelle.

== Track listing ==
=== May 2018 release ===
Digital download
No.	Title	Length
1.	"Dance Macabre"	3:39

=== August 2018 release ===
Digital download, promotional CD single
No.	Title	Length
1.	"Dance Macabre (Carpenter Brut Remix)"	3:37
2.	"Dance Macabre"	3:39

=== In Prequelle Exalted box set ===
7" single
No.	Title	Length
1.	"Dance Macabre"	3:39
2.	"Dance Macabre (Nocturnal Version)"	3:30

== Personnel ==
Credits adapted from liner notes.

- Tobias Forge – vocals (credited as "Cardinal Copia")
- A Group of Nameless Ghouls – lead guitar, rhythm guitar, bass guitar, keyboards, drums

== Charts ==
=== Weekly charts ===
Chart (2018–19)	Peak position
Sweden (Sverigetopplistan)	68
US Hot Rock & Alternative Songs (Billboard)	17
US Rock & Alternative Airplay (Billboard)	14

=== Year-end charts ===
Chart (2019)	Position
US Hot Rock Songs (Billboard)	64
US Rock Airplay (Billboard)	44

== Certifications ==
Region	Certification	Certified units/sales
Brazil (Pro-Música Brasil)	Gold	20,000^{‡}
Canada (Music Canada)	Gold	40,000^{‡}
Norway (IFPI Norway)	Gold	30,000^{‡}
United States (RIAA)	Platinum	1,000,000^{‡}
^{‡} Sales+streaming figures based on certification alone.
