= Cirice =

Single by Ghost

from the album Meliora
- B-side: "Absolution"
- Released: May 30, 2015
- Recorded: January 2015
- Genre: Heavy metal; doom metal
- Length: 6:02
- Label: Loma Vista
- Songwriters: Tobias Forge; Klas Åhlund
- Producer: Klas Åhlund

Ghost singles chronology
"Year Zero" (2013)	"Cirice" (2015)	"From the Pinnacle to the Pit" (2015)

"Cirice" (/səˈriːs/ sə-REES, Old English: [ˈtʃiritʃe]; 'church') is a song by the Swedish rock band Ghost, released on May 30, 2015, as the lead single from their third studio album Meliora. The song peaked at number 4 on the Mainstream Rock Songs chart, and won the Grammy Award for Best Metal Performance in 2016.

== Background and release ==
"Cirice" was originally conceived together with "Devil Church", which was its opening, as a very dark and doomy nine-minute instrumental without a chorus. With the assistance of producer Klas Åhlund, a chorus materialized and the two parts were split.

"Cirice" was released as a free download from the band's official website on May 30, 2015. It was first performed live at their June 3, 2015 concert in their hometown of Linköping. A CD-single coupled with the B-side "Absolution" was released on July 31, 2015, exclusively in independent record stores in the United States. Chad Childers of Loudwire noted the track as "building in tension and heaviness as it progresses." The song was performed live on The Late Show with Stephen Colbert on October 31, 2015, marking the band's first appearance on American television. The single's artwork is a reference to Silence of the Lambs.

== Music video ==
The song's music video, directed by Roboshobo, was inspired by the 1976 film Carrie. The video shows the band as schoolchildren performing the song at a school talent show, with a boy playing Papa Emeritus III (with Papa Emeritus II facepaint). As he sings the song, he is focused on a girl in the crowd with the two sharing a psychic connection of some kind. As the song climaxes, the principal tries to remove the boy from stage. The girl angrily rises to her feet and reveals "Carrie-like" psychic powers by mentally forcing the principal to release the boy, and then using her powers at random on the rest of the crowd. People run from the auditorium screaming, while the girl continues to smile. Eventually the principal manages to unplug the band's amplifier and puts an end to the madness. After the song ends, a man and a woman, presumably the boy's parents, stand up and cheer for the band with glee.

== Reception ==
"Cirice" peaked at number 4 on Billboard's Mainstream Rock Songs chart. Loudwire ranked the song second on their list of the 20 Best Metal Songs of 2015. "Cirice" and its music video were nominated for Best Metal Song and Best Metal Video in the 2015 Loudwire Music Awards.

The song won the Grammy Award for Best Metal Performance in 2016. A member of the band said that when he got the text message informing him of the nomination, he assumed it was for a Grammis, which are considered the Swedish equivalent to the American awards and which Ghost has won in the past.

== Track listing ==
No.	Title	Length
1.	"Cirice"	6:02
2.	"Absolution" (US CD version only)	4:51

== Charts ==
Chart (2015)	Peak position
US Mainstream Rock (Billboard)	4
US Rock Airplay (Billboard)	27

== Certifications ==
Region	Certification	Certified units/sales
Canada (Music Canada)	Gold	40,000^{‡}
Sweden (GLF)	Gold	20,000^{‡}
United States (RIAA)	Gold	500,000^{‡}
^{‡} Sales+streaming figures based on certification alone.

== Personnel ==
- Papa Emeritus III − vocals
- Nameless Ghouls – all instrumentalists: lead guitarist, bassist, keyboardist, drummer, rhythm guitarist
- David M. Brinley − single artwork
