= Radical.fm =

Digital music streaming service

- Type: Private
- Industry: Music streaming
- Founded: 2000
- Founders: Thomas McAlevey
- Headquarters: New York City, United States
- Area served: Worldwide
- Services: Internet radio, music streaming

Radical.FM was a digital music streaming service available on iOS devices, Android devices, and desktop web browsers. The service allows users to create their own custom online radio stations based on musical genres. Unlike other streaming services like Spotify and Pandora Radio, Radical.FM was completely free and based on donations through a "pay-what-you-can" model. The mobile application does not show or have audio ads, or charge subscription fees.

Radical.FM was founded by Thomas McAlevey, who previously launched the radio station Bandit Rock and the website Tomsradio.com. Radical.FM is headquartered in Venice, California.

The service was released on iTunes in August, 2013, and on Android in June, 2014 with a catalog of over 25 million tracks.

Radical.FM claims the service relies on human curation for its genres that are used to build "the best personalized radio stations in the world."

The company launched a desktop service in 2014.

In October, 2015, the company introduced RadCasting, personal broadcasting with synchronous music sharing and discovery, where users can broadcast and share their stations with any other user, on mobile or desktop.

As of 2018, this company has shut down.

== See also ==
- List of Internet radio stations
