= Seven Inches of Satanic Panic =

2019 EP by Ghost

EP / single by Ghost
- Released: 13 September 2019
- Studios: Park Studio, Stockholm
- Genre: Psychedelic rock
- Length: 7:21
- Label: Loma Vista
- Producer: Gene Walker

Ghost chronology
Prequelle (2018)	Seven Inches of Satanic Panic (2019)	Impera (2022)

Ghost singles chronology
"Faith" (2018)	"Seven Inches of Satanic Panic" (2019)	"Hunter's Moon" (2021)

Seven Inches of Satanic Panic is the third EP by the Swedish rock band Ghost. First released digitally on 13 September 2019 by Loma Vista Recordings, it features the songs "Kiss the Go-Goat", "Mary on a Cross" and "The Future Is A Foreign Land", written by vocalist Tobias Forge along with songwriters Salem al Fakir and Vincent Pontare. It was later released on 7" vinyl. Seven Inches of Satanic Panic has been described as a two-track EP and as a single.

In 2022, "Mary on a Cross" charted in the top 40 of thirteen European countries after trending on TikTok. The song was also certified Gold in Canada, Denmark, France, Germany, Italy and Spain, Platinum in Australia, Austria, New Zealand and Switzerland and the United Kingdom, and 2× Platinum in Brazil, Poland and the United States.

== Background and themes ==
According to Ghost's fictional backstory, Seven Inches of Satanic Panic contains two songs that were written and recorded by an early incarnation of the band in 1969, when Papa Emeritus Nihil was the vocalist. The 7" vinyl release claims to be remastered versions of songs recorded in 1969 at Thorn Industrial Audio Recording Studios, Hollywood.

According to Kelsey Chapstick of Revolver, "Kiss the Go-Goat" explores the favorite theme of Tobias Forge, leader of Ghost and the musician behind their Papa Emeritus character; "Lucifer, and the joy of giving yourself over to him."

Paul Travers of Metal Hammer described the ambiguous lyrics of "Mary on a Cross" as a "provocative mash-up of Biblical and sexual imagery." Forge has been hesitant to explain the meaning behind the song, but admits there are multiple layers to the lyrics; "The chorus is written very tongue in cheek of course. 'Go down' doesn't necessarily mean as in a 69 sense of the word... it can also mean go down as in go down in history, your own ascent. Mary doesn't necessarily mean Mary, mother of Jesus. It might mean Mary Magdalene, the proclaimed whore who might have been the wife of Jesus – just as a symbol for someone who came off as one thing but actually had other intentions and did something else. Someone who's miscredited." He went on to state that the song was "more about friendship and how, together with someone else, you might have been something at one point and then you ended up just not being like that."

== Release ==
On 12 September 2019, Ghost released a music video for "Kiss the Go-Goat", which depicts Papa Nihil performing as frontman of the band at the Whisky a Go Go in West Hollywood, California, in 1969. The following day, on 13 September 2019, Seven Inches of Satanic Panic was released on music streaming services through Loma Vista Recordings. It was released on 7" vinyl, with "Kiss the Go-Goat" as the A-side and "Mary on a Cross" as the B-side, on 27 September 2019. Seven Inches of Satanic Panic has been described as a two-track EP and as a single. The vinyl release peaked at number 2 on the UK Vinyl Singles Chart, whilst "Kiss the Go-Goat" reached number 4 on the Kerrang! Rock Chart.

In July and August 2022, "Mary on a Cross" went viral on TikTok. In response, Ghost released a "Slowed + Reverb" version of the song digitally on 26 August. The original recording then became the band's first to chart on the Billboard Hot 100 when it reached number 90 in September. An official "lyric video" for the song was released on 14 December. Similar to the video for "Kiss the Go-Goat", it features grainy, Super 8-like footage.

Following the release of the 2024 concert film Rite Here Rite Now, "The Future is a Foreign Land" was retroactively added to the digital and streaming versions of Seven Inches of Satanic Panic. Within the film's fictional storyline, the track is presented as a previously unknown third song performed by the character Papa Nihil in addition to "Kiss the Go-Goat" and "Mary on a Cross", eventually playing over the film's end credits. (Note: As depicted in the 2024 film Rite Here Rite Now)

Animated music videos for both "Mary on a Cross" and "The Future is a Foreign Land" were produced for Rite Here Rite Now, though only the former appears in the film itself, with the latter released via Ghost's YouTube channel on 25 July 2024.

== Track listing ==
All writing credited to Papa Emeritus Nihil and A Group of Nameless Ghouls.

No.	Title	Writer(s)	Length
1.	"Kiss the Go-Goat"	Tobias Forge; Salem Al Fakir; Vincent Pontare	3:16
2.	"Mary on a Cross"	Forge; Al Fakir; Pontare	4:05
Total length:			7:21

Streaming bonus track
No.	Title	Writer(s)	Length
3.	"The Future is a Foreign Land"	Forge; Al Fakir; Pontare	3:45
Total length:			11:06

== Personnel ==
Ghost

- Papa Emeritus Nihil
- A Group of Nameless Ghouls

== Charts ==
=== "Mary on a Cross" ===
==== Weekly charts ====
Weekly chart performance for "Mary on a Cross"
Chart (2022)	Peak position
Australia (ARIA)	89
Austria (Ö3 Austria Top 40)	31
Canada (Canadian Hot 100)	50
Czech Republic Singles Digital (ČNS IFPI)	15
Finland (Suomen virallinen lista)	7
France (SNEP)	191
Germany (GfK)	41
Global 200 (Billboard)	50
Greece International (IFPI)	28
Hungary (Single Top 40)	30
Iceland (Tónlistinn)	27
Ireland (IRMA)	25
Lithuania (AGATA)	20
Netherlands (Single Top 100)	93
Norway (VG-lista)	40
Portugal (AFP)	112
Slovakia (Singles Digitál Top 100)	27
Sweden (Sverigetopplistan)	16
Switzerland (Schweizer Hitparade)	37
UK Singles (Official Charts)	28
US Billboard Hot 100	90
US Hot Rock & Alternative Songs (Billboard)	11

=== Seven Inches of Satanic Panic ===
==== Weekly charts ====
Weekly chart performance for "Seven Inches of Satanic Panic"
Chart (2023)	Peak position
Hungary (Single Top 40)	13

==== Year-end charts ====
Year-end chart performance for "Mary on a Cross"
Chart (2022)	Position
US Hot Rock & Alternative Songs (Billboard)	51

== Certifications ==
Certifications for "Mary on a Cross"
Region	Certification	Certified units/sales
Australia (ARIA)	Platinum	70,000^{‡}
Austria (IFPI Austria)	Platinum	30,000^{‡}
Brazil (Pro-Música Brasil)	2× Platinum	80,000^{‡}
Canada (Music Canada)	Gold	40,000^{‡}
Denmark (IFPI Danmark)	Gold	45,000^{‡}
France (SNEP)	Gold	100,000^{‡}
Germany (BVMI)	Gold	300,000^{‡}
Italy (FIMI)	Gold	50,000^{‡}
New Zealand (RMNZ)	Platinum	30,000^{‡}
Poland (ZPAV)	2× Platinum	100,000^{‡}
Spain (Promusicae)	Gold	30,000^{‡}
Switzerland (IFPI Switzerland)	Platinum	20,000^{‡}
United Kingdom (BPI)	Platinum	600,000^{‡}
United States (RIAA)	2× Platinum	2,000,000^{‡}
^{‡} Sales+streaming figures based on certification alone.
