= Bandit Rock =

Swedish radio station

Bandit Rock is a Swedish radio station which plays rock, punk and heavy metal. The station, now a part of the Nordic Entertainment Group, was founded by American ex-pat Thomas McAlevey and began broadcasting in Stockholm in 1994.

Under McAlevey's leadership, Bandit Radio, “The Rock Home of Stockholm”, quickly achieved cult status. McAlevey and a group of private investors sold the station to the RTL Group (previously CLT Multi Media) in 1996.

Since that time the station has changed owners, modified its format, relaunched as the present ‘Bandit Rock’ in 2004, and expanded its broadcasts to include Södertälje in 2005 and Gothenburg in 2008. The stations broadcasts reaches 1.5 million listeners. According to SIFO 5.5% of the covered public or - 91,300 people - listen to Bandit daily. It's the most popular radio station among men. In 2006 Bandit Rock was awarded the "Stora Radio Priset" in the category for "Årets PLR-Station" by Radioakademin (the Swedish Radio Academy).

The station also hosts their own yearly award show.

== Frequencies ==
- Stockholm - 101.9 MHz
- Uppsala 101.1 MHz
