= List of songs recorded by Ghost =

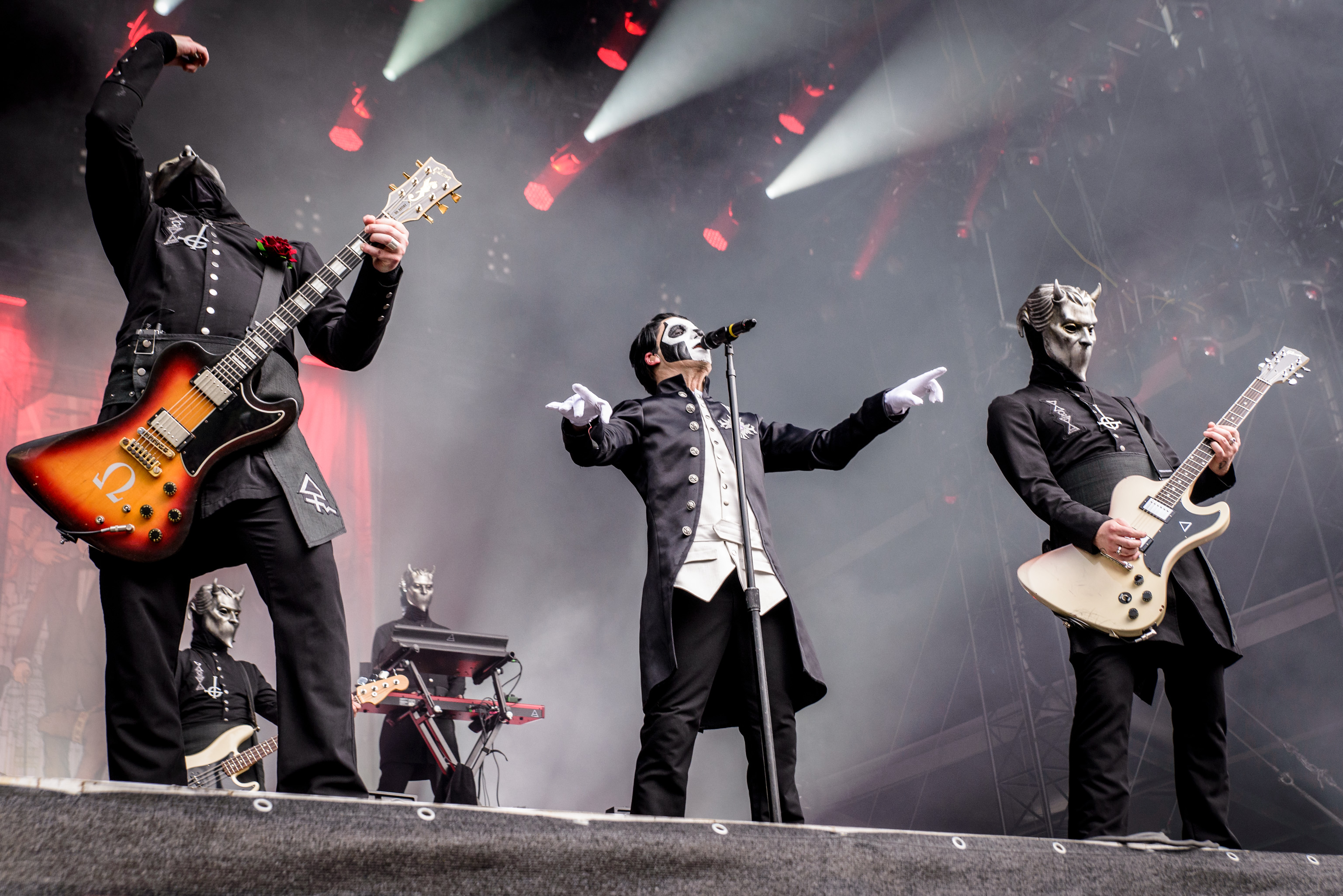
Ghost in 2016

Ghost, also known as Ghost B.C., is a Swedish rock band. They have released 6 albums and 4 extended plays (EPs), gathering 85 songs, mostly written by frontman Tobias Forge under the credit of "A Ghoul Writer".

This article gathers in the table below all the songs released by Ghost since their debut album Opus Eponymous (2010), in alphabetical order, and gives the song's writer(s), the first release album or EP, the album producer and the release year. It does not include live titles such as Ceremony and Devotion (2017).

8==Songs==

Key
Indicates a cover version, the original song not being written or co-written by Forge.
Indicates an extended play (EP).

| Song | Writer(s) | Album | Producer | Year | Ref. |
|---|---|---|---|---|---|
| "Absolution" | A Ghoul Writer (Tobias Forge), Indio Marcato (Martin Persner), Klas Frans Åhlund | Meliora | Klas Åhlund | 2015 | |
| "Ashes" | A Ghoul Writer (Tobias Forge) | Prequelle | Tom Dalgety | 2018 | |
| "Avalanche" | Leonard Cohen | Prequelle (Deluxe) | Tom Dalgety | 2018 | |
| "Bible" | Christian Falk, Fred Asp, Per Hägglund, Joakim Thåström | Popestar | Tom Dalgety | 2016 | |
| "Bite of Passage" | A Ghoul Writer (Tobias Forge) | Impera | Klas Åhlund | 2022 | |
| "Body and Blood" | A Ghoul Writer (Tobias Forge), Indio Marcato (Martin Persner) | Infestissumam | Nick Raskulinecz | 2013 | |
| "Call Me Little Sunshine" | A Ghoul Writer (Tobias Forge), Max Grahn | Impera | Klas Åhlund | 2022 | |
| "Cenotaph" | A Ghoul Writer (Tobias Forge), Max Grahn | Skeletá | Gene Walker | 2025 | |
| "Cirice" | A Ghoul Writer (Tobias Forge), Klas Frans Åhlund | Meliora | Klas Åhlund | 2015 | |
| "Con Clavi Con Dio" | A Ghoul Writer (Tobias Forge) | Opus Eponymous | Gene Walker | 2010 | |
| "Crucified" | Alexander Bard, Anders Wollbeck, Jean-Pierre Barda | If You Have Ghost | Dave Grohl | 2013 | |
| "Dance Macabre" | A Ghoul Writer (Tobias Forge), Salem Al Fakir, Vincent Pontare | Prequelle | Tom Dalgety | 2018 | |
| "Darkness at the Heart of My Love" | A Ghoul Writer (Tobias Forge), Salem Al Fakir, Vincent Pontare | Impera | Klas Åhlund | 2022 | |
| "Death Knell" | A Ghoul Writer (Tobias Forge) | Opus Eponymous | Gene Walker | 2010 | |
| "De Profundis Borealis" | A Ghoul Writer (Tobias Forge), Max Grahn | Skeletá | Gene Walker | 2025 | |
| "Depth of Satan's Eyes" | A Ghoul Writer (Tobias Forge) | Infestissumam | Nick Raskulinecz | 2013 | |
| "Deus Culpa" | A Ghoul Writer (Tobias Forge) | Opus Eponymous | Gene Walker | 2010 | |
| "Deus in Absentia" | A Ghoul Writer (Tobias Forge), Johan Lindström, Klas Frans Åhlund | Meliora | Klas Åhlund | 2015 | |
| "Devil Church" | A Ghoul Writer (Tobias Forge) | Meliora | Klas Åhlund | 2015 | |
| "Dominion" | A Ghoul Writer (Tobias Forge), Salem Al Fakir, Vincent Pontare | Impera | Klas Åhlund | 2022 | |
| "Elizabeth" | A Ghoul Writer (Tobias Forge) | Opus Eponymous | Gene Walker | 2010 | |
| "Enter Sandman" | Kirk Hammett, James Hetfield, Lars Ulrich | The Metallica Blacklist | Gene Walker | 2021 | |
| "Excelsis" | A Ghoul Writer (Tobias Forge), Max Grahn | Skeletá | Gene Walker | 2025 | |
| "Faith" | A Ghoul Writer (Tobias Forge), Tom Dalgety | Prequelle | Tom Dalgety | 2018 | |
| "The Future Is a Foreign Land" | A Ghoul Writer (Tobias Forge), Salem Al Fakir, Vincent Pontare | Rite Here Rite Now - Original Motion Picture Soundtrack | Gene Walker | 2024 | |
| "From the Pinnacle to the Pit" | A Ghoul Writer (Tobias Forge), Indio Marcato (Martin Persner), Klas Frans Åhlund | Meliora | Klas Åhlund | 2015 | |
| "Genesis" | A Ghoul Writer (Tobias Forge) | Opus Eponymous | Gene Walker | 2010 | |
| "Ghuleh / Zombie Queen" | A Ghoul Writer (Tobias Forge) | Infestissumam | Nick Raskulinecz | 2013 | |
| "Griftwood" | A Ghoul Writer (Tobias Forge), Peter Svensson, Klas Åhlund | Impera | Klas Åhlund | 2022 | |
| "Guiding Lights" | A Ghoul Writer (Tobias Forge), Max Grahn | Skeletá | Gene Walker | 2025 | |
| "Hanging Around" | Hugh Cornwell, Jean-Jacques Burnel, Dave Greenfield, Jet Black | Phantomime | Rich Costey | 2023 | |
| "He Is" | A Ghoul Writer (Tobias Forge), Indio Marcato (Martin Persner), Klas Frans Åhlund | Meliora | Klas Åhlund | 2015 | |
| "Helvetesfönster" | A Ghoul Writer (Tobias Forge) | Prequelle | Tom Dalgety | 2018 | |
| "Here Comes the Sun" | George Harrison | Opus Eponymous (Japanese edition) | Gene Walker | 2010 | |
| "Hunter's Moon" | A Ghoul Writer (Tobias Forge), Max Grahn | Impera | Klas Åhlund | 2021 | |
| "I Believe" | James Ford, Jas Shaw, Simon Lord | Popestar | Tom Dalgety | 2016 | |
| "Idolatrine" | A Ghoul Writer (Tobias Forge) | Infestissumam | Nick Raskulinecz | 2013 | |
| "If You Have Ghosts" | Roky Erickson | If You Have Ghost | Dave Grohl | 2013 | |
| "I'm a Marionette" | Benny Andersson, Björn Ulvaeus | If You Have Ghost | Dave Grohl | 2013 | |
| "Imperium" | A Ghoul Writer (Tobias Forge) | Impera | Klas Åhlund | 2022 | |
| "Infestissumam" | A Ghoul Writer (Tobias Forge) | Infestissumam | Nick Raskulinecz | 2013 | |
| "It's a Sin" | Chris Lowe, Neil Tennant | Prequelle (Deluxe) | Tom Dalgety | 2018 | |
| "Jesus He Knows Me" | Tony Banks, Phil Collins, Mike Rutherford | Phantomime | Rich Costey | 2023 | |
| "Jigolo Har Megiddo" | A Ghoul Writer (Tobias Forge) | Infestissumam | Nick Raskulinecz | 2013 | |
| "Kaisarion" | A Ghoul Writer (Tobias Forge), Joakim Berg | Impera | Klas Åhlund | 2022 | |
| "Kiss the Go-Goat" | A Ghoul Writer (Tobias Forge), Salem Al Fakir, Vincent Pontare | Seven Inches of Satanic Panic | Gene Walker | 2019 | |
| "Lachryma" | A Ghoul Writer (Tobias Forge), Max Grahn | Skeletá | Gene Walker | 2025 | |
| "La Mantra Mori" | A Ghoul Writer (Tobias Forge) | Infestissumam (Deluxe) | Nick Raskulinecz | 2013 | |
| "Life Eternal" | A Ghoul Writer (Tobias Forge), Salem Al Fakir, Vincent Pontare | Prequelle | Tom Dalgety | 2018 | |
| "Mary on a Cross" | A Ghoul Writer (Tobias Forge), Salem Al Fakir, Vincent Pontare | Seven Inches of Satanic Panic | Gene Walker | 2019 | |
| "Majesty" | A Ghoul Writer (Tobias Forge), Indio Marcato (Martin Persner) | Meliora | Klas Åhlund | 2015 | |
| "Marks of the Evil One" | A Ghoul Writer (Tobias Forge) | Skeletá | Gene Walker | 2025 | |
| "Miasma" | A Ghoul Writer (Tobias Forge) | Prequelle | Tom Dalgety | 2018 | |
| "Missilia Amori" | A Ghoul Writer (Tobias Forge) | Skeletá | Gene Walker | 2025 | |
| "Missionary Man" | Annie Lennox, Dave Stewart | Popestar | Tom Dalgety | 2016 | |
| "Mummy Dust" | A Ghoul Writer (Tobias Forge), Gustav Lindström, Indio Marcato (Martin Persner), Klas Frans Åhlund | Meliora | Klas Åhlund | 2015 | |
| "Monstrance Clock" | A Ghoul Writer (Tobias Forge), Indio Marcato (Martin Persner) | Infestissumam | Nick Raskulinecz | 2013 | |
| "Nocturnal Me" | Ian McCulloch, Les Pattinson, Pete De Freitas, Will Sergeant | Popestar | Tom Dalgety | 2016 | |
| "Peacefield" | A Ghoul Writer (Tobias Forge), Salem Al Fakir, Vincent Pontare | Skeletá | Gene Walker | 2025 | |
| "Per Aspera ad Inferi" | A Ghoul Writer (Tobias Forge) | Infestissumam | Nick Raskulinecz | 2013 | |
| "Phantom of the Opera" | Steve Harris | Phantomime | Rich Costey | 2023 | |
| "Prime Mover" | A Ghoul Writer (Tobias Forge) | Opus Eponymous | Gene Walker | 2010 | |
| "Pro Memoria" | A Ghoul Writer (Tobias Forge), Jesse St. John, Niclas Frisk, Sarah Hudson | Prequelle | Tom Dalgety | 2018 | |
| "Rats" | A Ghoul Writer (Tobias Forge), Tom Dalgety | Prequelle | Tom Dalgety | 2018 | |
| "Respite on the Spitalfields" | A Ghoul Writer (Tobias Forge), Joakim Berg | Impera | Klas Åhlund | 2022 | |
| "Ritual" | A Ghoul Writer (Tobias Forge) | Opus Eponymous | Gene Walker | 2010 | |
| "Satanized" | A Ghoul Writer (Tobias Forge), Salem Al Fakir, Vincent Pontare | Skeletá | Gene Walker | 2025 | |
| "Satan Prayer" | A Ghoul Writer (Tobias Forge) | Opus Eponymous | Gene Walker | 2010 | |
| "Secular Haze" | A Ghoul Writer (Tobias Forge) | Infestissumam | Nick Raskulinecz | 2013 | |
| "See No Evil" | Tom Verlaine | Phantomime | Rich Costey | 2023 | |
| "See the Light" | A Ghoul Writer (Tobias Forge), Dimitri Tokovoi, Tom Dalgety | Prequelle | Tom Dalgety | 2018 | |
| "Spillways" | A Ghoul Writer (Tobias Forge), Salem Al Fakir, Vincent Pontare | Impera | Klas Åhlund | 2022 | |
| "Spirit" | A Ghoul Writer (Tobias Forge), Indio Marcato (Martin Persner) | Meliora | Klas Åhlund | 2015 | |
| "Spöksonat" | A Ghoul Writer (Tobias Forge), Klas Frans Åhlund | Meliora | Klas Åhlund | 2015 | |
| "Square Hammer" | A Ghoul Writer (Tobias Forge) | Popestar | Tom Dalgety | 2016 | |
| "Stand By Him" | A Ghoul Writer (Tobias Forge) | Opus Eponymous | Gene Walker | 2010 | |
| "Stay" | Siobhan Fahey, Marcella Detroit, David A. Stewart | Stay (feat. Patrick Wilson) - Single | Tom Dalgety | 2023 | |
| "Twenties" | A Ghoul Writer (Tobias Forge), Salem Al Fakir, Vincent Pontare | Impera | Klas Åhlund | 2022 | |
| "Umbra" | A Ghoul Writer (Tobias Forge), Max Grahn | Skeletá | Gene Walker | 2025 | |
| "Waiting For The Night" | Martin Gore | If You Have Ghost | Dave Grohl | 2013 | |
| "Watcher in the Sky" | A Ghoul Writer (Tobias Forge), Salem Al Fakir, Vincent Pontare | Impera | Klas Åhlund | 2022 | |
| "We Don't Need Another Hero (Thunderdome)" | Graham Lyle, Terry Britten | Phantomime | Rich Costey | 2023 | |
| "Witch Image" | A Ghoul Writer (Tobias Forge), Suzy Shinn, Tom Dalgety | Prequelle | Tom Dalgety | 2018 | |
| "Year Zero" | A Ghoul Writer (Tobias Forge), Indio Marcato (Martin Persner) | Infestissumam | Nick Raskulinecz | 2013 | |
| "Zenith" | A Ghoul Writer (Tobias Forge), Indio Marcato (Martin Persner), Klas Åhlund | Meliora (Deluxe) | Klas Åhlund | 2015 | |

== Remixes/alternate versions ==
| Song | Writer(s) | Release | Producer | Year | Ref. |
|---|---|---|---|---|---|
| Dance Macabre (Carpenter Brut Mix) | A Ghoul Writer (Tobias Forge), Salem Al Fakir, Vincent Pontare | Dance Macabre (Carpenter Brut Remix) - Single | | 2018 | |
| Dance Macabre (Nocturnal Version) | A Ghoul Writer (Tobias Forge), Salem Al Fakir, Vincent Pontare | Prequelle (Exalted) | | 2019 | |
| He Is (feat. Alison Mosshart) | A Ghoul Writer (Tobias Forge), Indio Marcato (Martin Persner), Klas Frans Åhlund | He Is - EP | Klas Frans Åhlund | 2017 | |
| He Is (HEALTH Remix) | A Ghoul Writer (Tobias Forge), Indio Marcato (Martin Persner), Klas Frans Åhlund | He Is - EP | Klas Frans Åhlund | 2017 | |
| He Is (The Haxan Cloak Remix) | A Ghoul Writer (Tobias Forge), Indio Marcato (Martin Persner), Klas Frans Åhlund | He Is - EP | Klas Frans Åhlund | 2017 | |
| Hunter's Moon (Movie Version) | A Ghoul Writer (Tobias Forge), Max Grahn | Impera as Bonus Track | Tom Dalgety | 2021 | |
| Mary On A Cross (slowed + reverb) | A Ghoul Writer (Tobias Forge), Salem Al Fakir, Vincent Pontare | Mary On A Cross (slowed + reverb) - Single | | 2022 | |
| Orez Raey | A Ghoul Writer (Tobias Forge), Indio Marcato (Martin Persner) | Year Zero - Single | Nick Raskulinecz | 2013 | |
| Spillways (feat. Joe Elliot) | A Ghoul Writer (Tobias Forge), Salem Al Fakir, Vincent Pontare | Spillways - Single | | 2023 | |
