= Imperatour =

2022–23 concert tour by Ghost

- Tour by Ghost
- Poster for the European leg of the tour
- Location: Australia; Europe; North America; South America
- Associated album: Impera
- Start date: 25 January 2022
- End date: 7 October 2023
- Legs: 7
- No. of shows: 129

Ghost concert chronology
- A Pale Tour Named Death (2018–2020); Imperatour (2022–2023); Skeletour (2025–2026)

The Imperatour was a concert tour by the Swedish rock band Ghost in support of their fifth studio album, Impera. Following its announcement on 20 September 2021, the tour began on 25 January 2022 at the Reno Events Center in Reno, Nevada, and concluded at the Brisbane Entertainment Centre in Brisbane, Australia, on 7 October 2023.

The tour featured lead singer Tobias Forge performing under the persona of "Papa Emeritus IV". Since the band's inception, Forge has performed under several incarnations of pope-like personas bearing the title of "Papa Emeritus". For the release of the band's 2018 album Prequelle, as well as their 2018–2020 concert tour A Pale Tour Named Death, Forge performed in the persona of "Cardinal Copia", a character who, at the final show of that tour, was promoted to Papa Emeritus IV. For Imperatour, as with previous tours, Forge was backed by a band of masked musicians known as "Nameless Ghouls".

Imperatour encompassed seven legs: a United States leg co-headlined with the Danish band Volbeat, and featuring Twin Temple as special guests, which spanned from January to March 2022; a European leg featuring Uncle Acid & the Deadbeats and Twin Temple, from April to June; a North American leg, with Mastodon and Spiritbox, from August to September; a second European leg which features a span of headlining and festival performances, from May to July 2023; a second United States leg with Amon Amarth as special guests from August to September; a South American leg in September which was their first time headlining in Brazil, Argentina and Chile, and an Australian leg in October.

== Background and overview ==
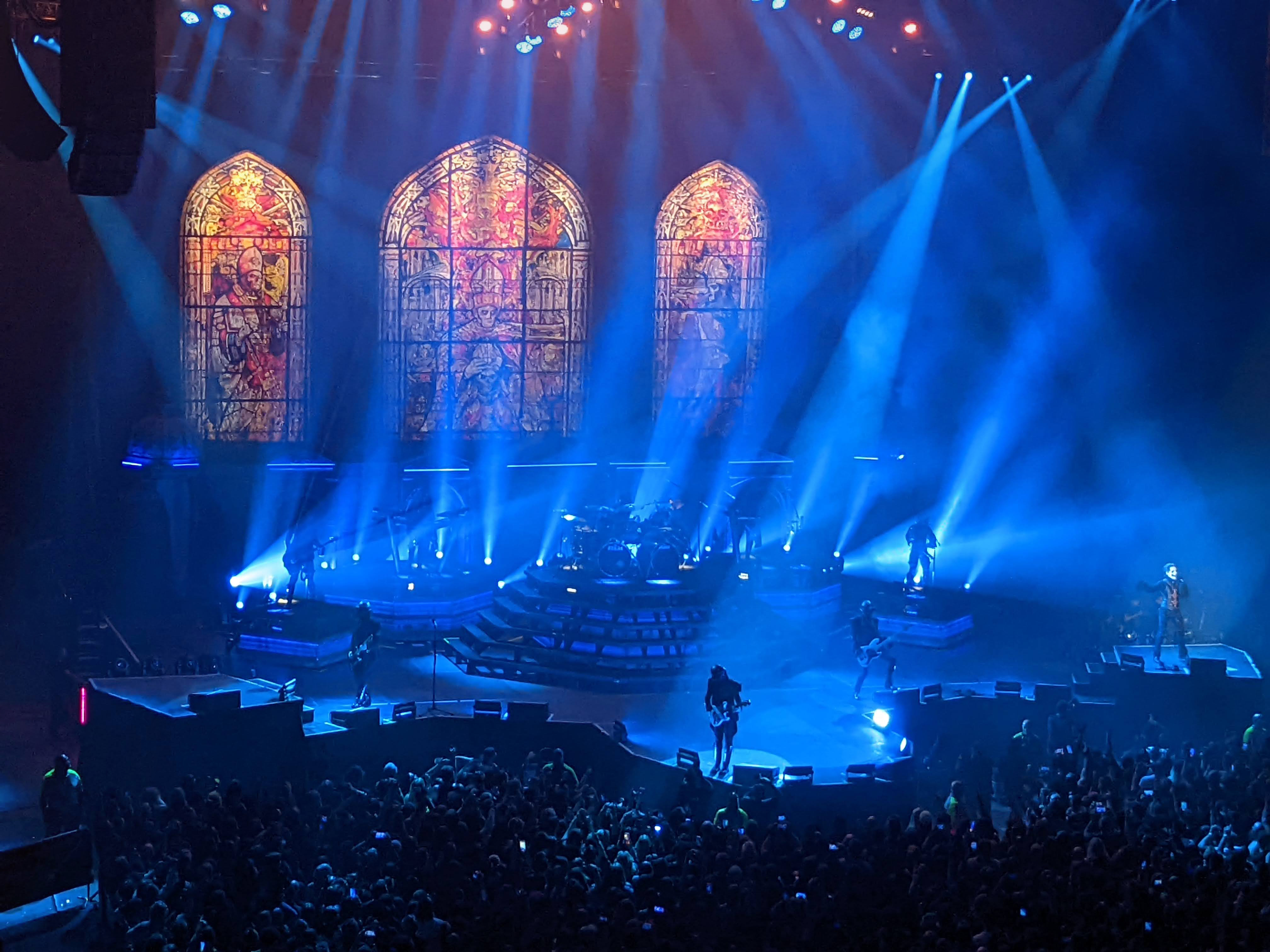
Ghost performing in Tampa, Florida, on 6 September 2022

On 30 December 2020, Ghost announced that "several big things" were being developed for 2021, indicating new live performances. In September 2021, a United States tour co-headlined with Volbeat and featuring special guests Twin Temple was announced, and would become the first leg of Imperatour, kicking off in January 2022. During the first show, at Reno, Nevada's Reno Events Center on 25 January, Ghost performed "Kaisarion", the second song from their 2022 album Impera, for the first time. Each of the subsequent Imperatour concerts had featured "Kaisarion" as the first song on Ghost's setlist. The show also marked the introduction of new steampunk-inspired costumes worn by the Nameless Ghouls. Volbeat's planned appearance on the third show of the US tour was cancelled when their drummer Jon Larsen tested positive for COVID-19. The first leg of the tour concluded in March 2022 at Anaheim, California's Honda Center.

Ghost headlined the second leg of the tour, which took place in Europe from 9 April to 18 June 2022, supported by Uncle Acid & the Deadbeats and Twin Temple. During Ghost's performance on 9 April, at Manchester's AO Arena, the songs "Spillways" and "Call Me Little Sunshine" made their live debuts. The show on 18 June took place in Clisson, France, as part of the Hellfest music festival. The Hellfest show saw the band's live debut of their song "Griftwood". The show's setlist was cut short due to Forge losing his voice, and concluded with the song "Dance Macabre" rather than the initially planned show closer, "Square Hammer"; after performing "Dance Macabre", Forge thanked the audience and stated, "My voice is completely fucked. I cannot take one other song for you."

The third leg of the tour, spanning the US and Canada, featured Mastodon and Spiritbox as the opening acts; this leg began on 26 August and concluded on 23 September. During Ghost's performance on 26 August, at San Diego's Pechanga Arena, the song "Watcher in the Sky" made its live debut. At the 2 September show at Huntsville, Alabama's Von Braun Center, during a performance of the song "Year Zero", one of the Nameless Ghouls (later identified as Justin "Jutty" Taylor) fell from atop a platform; after the concert, Taylor jokingly tweeted, "I meant to do that."

During an interview on 12 September 2022, Forge confirmed that there would be more touring in 2023, with a European leg in the summer hinted in a video. Ghost later announced that they would perform at both the Sweden Rock Festival on 10 June 2023 in Sölvesborg, Sweden and the Tuska Open Air in Helsinki, Finland. The band later announced a third US leg dubbed the "Re-Imperatour" on 13 February 2023, which featured Amon Amarth as special guests. A second show at the Kia Forum in Los Angeles was announced following a video, giving fans speculation that the Papa Emeritus IV character would be "killed off" at the end of the tour. A South American leg was later announced, acknowledging it as their first time headlining in Brazil and Argentina. The band then performed an Australian leg shortly after, which took place in October, concluding the tour in Brisbane, which was Papa Emeritus IV's final performance.

Preceding Ghost's setlist at most stops on the tour are taped recordings of the Jan Johansson composition "Klara stjärnor" and Gregorio Allegri's setting Miserere mei, Deus. The exact setlist for Imperatour has varied, but has consistently utilized "Kaisarion" as an opening number and included songs from each of the band's albums released thus far—Opus Eponymous, Infestissumam (only one song from Infestissumam has appeared in any of the setlists, that being "Year Zero"), Meliora, Prequelle, and Impera.

The character of Papa Nihil, who was "unceremoniously 'killed off'" at the final show of the band's previous tour, A Pale Tour Named Death, in 2020, did not appear during any of the concerts in the first leg of Imperatour. However, at the 9 April show in Manchester, the character was wheeled out onto the stage and brought "back to life", performing a saxophone solo during the song "Miasma".

== Reception ==
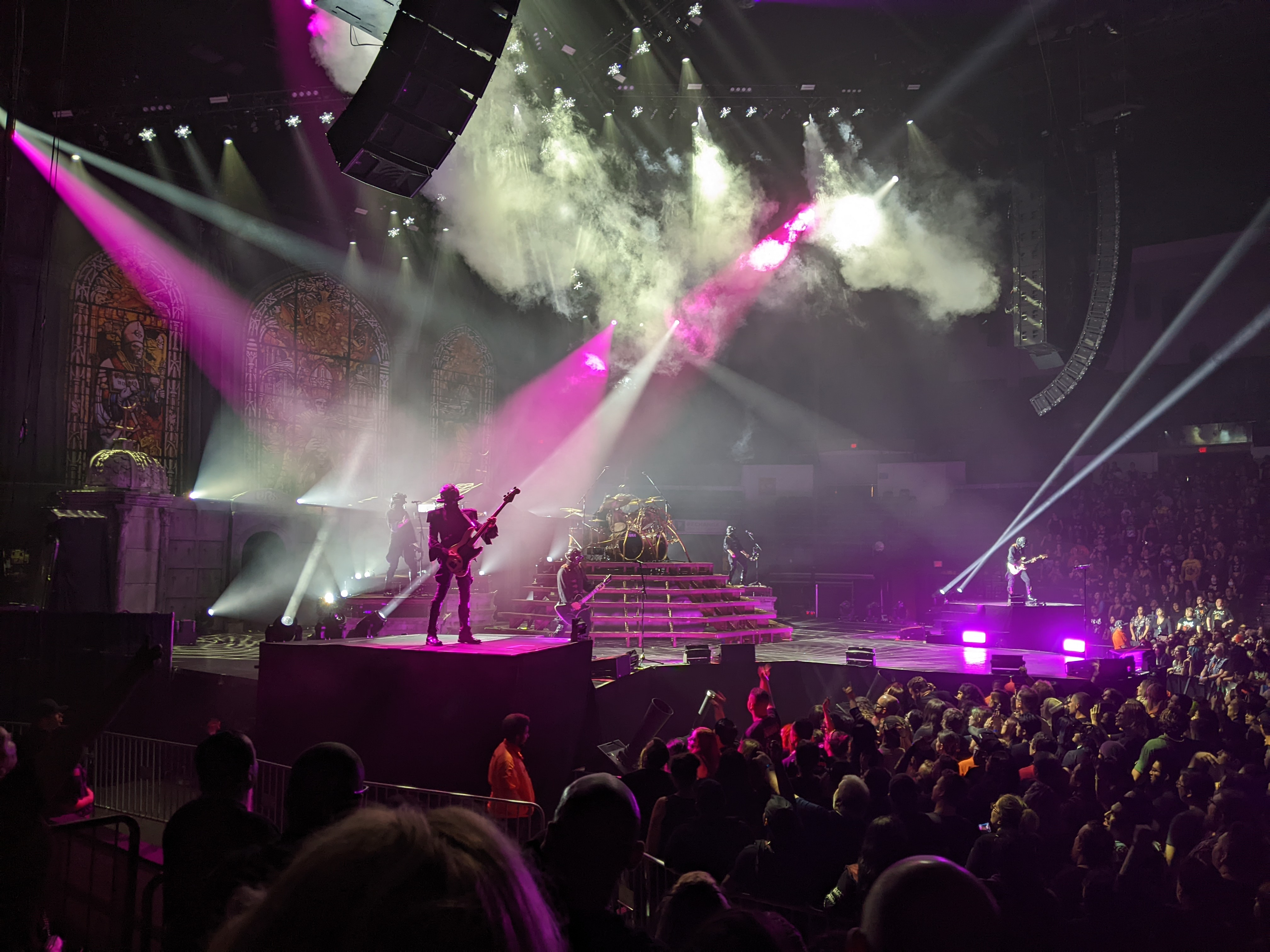
Ghost performing in San Diego, California, on 26 August 2022

Reviewing the 14 February 2022 show at Pittsburgh's Petersen Events Center, Scott Mervis of the Pittsburgh Post-Gazette praised the band's sound as "somewhere in the zone between Metallica and Blue Öyster Cult" and their flexibility in regards to the genres of their songs, writing that they are "never shy to flash influences, to go from the '60s-scented psych-rock of 'Mary on a Cross' to the Slayer stomp of 'Cirice' to the dreamy pop-metal-prog of 'Hunter's Moon'". However, he called the concert "more like a Ghost greatest-hits show" than one in support of the Impera album, concluding: "As great as it all was, Ghost fans of Pittsburgh surely have one plea for the Papa: please return with the whole Impera package."

The Guardian's Chris Lord, reviewing the 9 April 2022 show at Manchester's AO Arena, gave the concert a score of five out of five stars. He wrote that, by the second song on the setlist, "Rats", the band "already has a packed arena in raptures," and that "'Square Hammer' inspires the most frenzied singalong of the night." Of the show's technical aspects and the band members themselves, Lord wrote: "There are confetti cannons, costume changes, flamethrowers and other forms of pyro, but the band is self-aware, preventing proceedings from ever getting too cartoonish. As one of the three guitarists relishes a solo spot on 'From the Pinnacle to the Pit' a little much for his liking, Forge playfully reprimands them with a wagging finger; this is pantomime as much as rock 'n' roll."

Merlin Alderslade of Metal Hammer, also reviewing the Manchester show, wrote that the setlist was "absolutely stacked with songs designed to shake hips", and that, "They may attract their share of haters, but facts are facts: few modern bands in heavy metal know how to put on a massive, arena-worthy show like Ghost."

== Film ==
Footage from the two shows performed at the Kia Forum in Inglewood, California, on 11 and 12 September 2023 was featured in a concert film titled Rite Here Rite Now, directed by Forge and Alex Ross Perry. The film also includes a narrative story based on a web series produced by Ghost that incorporates fictional characters and lore surrounding the band. The film was released theatrically by Trafalgar Releasing on 20 June 2024.

== Set list ==
Reno Events Center
- "Imperium" (taped)
1. "Kaisarion"
2. "Rats"
3. "From the Pinnacle to the Pit"
4. "Mary on a Cross"
5. "Devil Church"
6. "Cirice"
7. "Hunter's Moon"
8. "Faith"
9. "Helvetesfönster" (abridged)
10. "Year Zero"
11. "Ritual"
12. "Mummy Dust"
13. "Kiss the Go-Goat"

Encore

14. "Enter Sandman" (Metallica cover)
15. "Dance Macabre"
16. "Square Hammer"
- "Sorrow in the Wind" (Emmylou Harris song) (taped)
AO Arena
- "Klara stjärnor" (Jan Johansson composition) (taped)
- Miserere mei, Deus (Gregorio Allegri) (taped)
- "Imperium" (taped)
1. "Kaisarion"
2. "Rats"
3. "From the Pinnacle to the Pit"
4. "Spillways"
5. "Devil Church"
6. "Call Me Little Sunshine"
7. "Miasma"
8. "Cirice"
9. "Hunter's Moon"
10. "Faith"
11. "Helvetesfönster"
12. "Year Zero"
13. "He Is"
14. "Ritual"
15. "Mummy Dust"
16. "Kiss the Go-Goat"

Encore

14. "Enter Sandman" (Metallica cover)
15. "Dance Macabre"
16. "Square Hammer"
- "Sorrow in the Wind" (Emmylou Harris song) (taped)
Pechanga Arena
- "Klara stjärnor" (Jan Johansson composition) (taped)
- Miserere mei, Deus (Gregorio Allegri) (taped)
- "Imperium" (taped)
1. "Kaisarion"
2. "Rats"
3. "Faith"
4. "Spillways"
5. "Devil Church"
6. "Cirice"
7. "Hunter's Moon"
8. "Ritual"
9. "Call Me Little Sunshine"
10. "Con Clavi Con Dio"
11. "Prime Mover"
12. "Watcher in the Sky"
13. "Year Zero"
14. "He Is"
15. "Miasma"
16. "Mary on a Cross"
17. "Mummy Dust"

Encore

18. "Dance Macabre"
19. "Square Hammer"
- "Sorrow in the Wind" (Emmylou Harris song) (taped)
Zénith de la Métropole Rouen Normandie
- "Klara stjärnor" (Jan Johansson composition) (taped)
- Miserere mei, Deus (Gregorio Allegri) (taped)
- "Imperium" (taped)
1. "Kaisarion"
2. "Rats"
3. "Faith"
4. "Spillways"
5. "Cirice"
6. "Hunter's Moon"
7. "Jesus He Knows Me" (Genesis cover)
8. "Ritual"
9. "Call Me Little Sunshine"
10. "Con Clavi Con Dio"
11. "Watcher in the Sky"
12. "Year Zero"
13. "He Is"
14. "Miasma"
15. "Mary on a Cross"
16. "Mummy Dust"
17. "Respite on the Spitalfields"

Encore

18. "Kiss the Go-Goat"
19. "Dance Macabre"
20. "Square Hammer"
- "Sorrow in the Wind" (Emmylou Harris song) (taped)
Concord Pavilion
- "Klara stjärnor" (Jan Johansson composition) (taped)
- Miserere mei, Deus (Gregorio Allegri) (taped)
- "Imperium" (taped)
1. "Kaisarion"
2. "Rats"
3. "From the Pinnacle to the Pit"
4. "Spillways"
5. "Cirice"
6. "Absolution"
7. "Ritual"
8. "Call Me Little Sunshine"
9. "Con Clavi Con Dio"
10. "Watcher in the Sky"
11. "Year Zero"
12. "He Is"
13. "Miasma"
14. "Mary on a Cross"
15. "Mummy Dust"
16. "Respite on the Spitalfields"

Encore

17. "Kiss the Go-Goat"
18. "Dance Macabre"
19. "Square Hammer"
- "Sorrow in the Wind" (Emmylou Harris song) (taped)

=== Notes ===
- The band performed "Twenties" in Inglewood at the 11 September 2023 performance.

== Tour dates ==
List of 2022 concerts, showing date, city, country, venue, and opening acts
Date	City	Country	Venue	Support Act(s)
25 January 2022	Reno	United States	Reno Events Center	Volbeat; Twin Temple
27 January 2022	Seattle	United States	Climate Pledge Arena	Volbeat; Twin Temple
28 January 2022	Nampa	United States	Ford Idaho Arena	Twin Temple
29 January 2022	Portland	United States	Veterans Memorial Coliseum	Volbeat; Twin Temple
31 January 2022	West Valley City	United States	Maverik Center	Volbeat; Twin Temple
2 February 2022	Denver	United States	Ball Arena	Volbeat; Twin Temple
4 February 2022	Lincoln	United States	Pinnacle Bank Arena	Volbeat; Twin Temple
5 February 2022	Minneapolis	United States	Target Center	Volbeat; Twin Temple
7 February 2022	Columbus	United States	Nationwide Arena	Volbeat; Twin Temple
8 February 2022	Hershey	United States	Giant Center	Volbeat; Twin Temple
10 February 2022	Newark	United States	Prudential Center	Volbeat; Twin Temple
11 February 2022	Worcester	United States	DCU Center	Volbeat; Twin Temple
12 February 2022	Camden	United States	Waterfront Music Pavilion	Volbeat; Twin Temple
14 February 2022	Pittsburgh	United States	Petersen Events Center	Volbeat; Twin Temple
15 February 2022	Toledo	United States	Huntington Center	Volbeat; Twin Temple
16 February 2022	Grand Rapids	United States	Van Andel Arena	Volbeat; Twin Temple
18 February 2022	Rosemont	United States	Allstate Arena	Volbeat; Twin Temple
19 February 2022	Cincinnati	United States	Heritage Bank Center	Volbeat; Twin Temple
20 February 2022	Milwaukee	United States	Fiserv Forum	Volbeat; Twin Temple
21 February 2022	St. Louis	United States	Chaifetz Arena	Volbeat; Twin Temple
23 February 2022	Independence	United States	Cable Dahmer Arena	Volbeat; Twin Temple
25 February 2022	Sugar Land	United States	Smart Financial Centre	Volbeat; Twin Temple
26 February 2022	Dallas	United States	Fair Park Coliseum	Volbeat; Twin Temple
28 February 2022	El Paso	United States	Don Haskins Center	Volbeat; Twin Temple
1 March 2022	Phoenix	United States	Footprint Center	Volbeat; Twin Temple
3 March 2022	Anaheim	United States	Honda Center	Volbeat; Twin Temple
9 April 2022	Manchester	England	AO Arena	Uncle Acid & the Deadbeats; Twin Temple
11 April 2022	London	England	The O_{2} Arena	Uncle Acid & the Deadbeats; Twin Temple
13 April 2022	Glasgow	Scotland	OVO Hydro	Uncle Acid & the Deadbeats; Twin Temple
15 April 2022	Birmingham	England	Resorts World Arena	Uncle Acid & the Deadbeats; Twin Temple
17 April 2022	Rotterdam	Netherlands	RTM Stage	Uncle Acid & the Deadbeats; Twin Temple
18 April 2022	Paris	France	Accor Arena	Uncle Acid & the Deadbeats; Twin Temple
19 April 2022	Cologne	Germany	Lanxess Arena	Uncle Acid & the Deadbeats; Twin Temple
22 April 2022	Frankfurt	Germany	Festhalle Frankfurt	Uncle Acid & the Deadbeats; Twin Temple
24 April 2022	Prague	Czech Republic	O2 Arena	Uncle Acid & the Deadbeats; Twin Temple
27 April 2022	Tampere	Finland	Tampere Deck Arena	Uncle Acid & the Deadbeats; Twin Temple
29 April 2022	Stockholm	Sweden	Avicii Arena	Uncle Acid & the Deadbeats; Twin Temple
30 April 2022	Oslo	Norway	Oslo Spektrum	Uncle Acid & the Deadbeats; Twin Temple
1 May 2022	Malmö	Sweden	Malmö Arena	Uncle Acid & the Deadbeats; Twin Temple
3 May 2022	Brussels	Belgium	Forest National	Uncle Acid & the Deadbeats; Twin Temple
5 May 2022	Milan	Italy	Mediolanum Forum	Uncle Acid & the Deadbeats; Twin Temple
7 May 2022	Badalona	Spain	Palau Municipal d'Esports de Badalona	Uncle Acid & the Deadbeats; Twin Temple
8 May 2022	Madrid	Spain	Palacio Vistalegre	Uncle Acid & the Deadbeats; Twin Temple
11 May 2022	Vienna	Austria	Wiener Stadthalle	Uncle Acid & the Deadbeats; Twin Temple
13 May 2022	Zurich	Switzerland	Hallenstadion	Uncle Acid & the Deadbeats; Twin Temple
15 May 2022	Hanover	Germany	ZAG-Arena	Uncle Acid & the Deadbeats; Twin Temple
16 May 2022	Munich	Germany	Olympiahalle	Uncle Acid & the Deadbeats; Twin Temple
18 May 2022	Budapest	Hungary	Budapest Sports Arena	Uncle Acid & the Deadbeats; Twin Temple
18 June 2022 (Note: The concert on 18 June 2022 was a part of Hellfest.)	Clisson	France	Val de Moine	—N/a
26 August 2022	San Diego	United States	Pechanga Arena	Mastodon; Spiritbox
27 August 2022	Tucson	United States	Tucson Arena	Mastodon; Spiritbox
30 August 2022	Austin	United States	Moody Center	Mastodon; Spiritbox
31 August 2022	Corpus Christi	United States	American Bank Center Arena	Mastodon; Spiritbox
2 September 2022	Huntsville	United States	Propst Arena	Mastodon; Spiritbox
3 September 2022	Duluth	United States	Gas South Arena	Mastodon; Spiritbox
4 September 2022	Asheville	United States	Harrah's Cherokee Center	Mastodon; Spiritbox
6 September 2022	Tampa	United States	Yuengling Center	Mastodon; Spiritbox
8 September 2022 (Note: The concert on 8 September 2022 was a part of Blue Ridge Rock Festival.)	Danville	United States	Virginia International Raceway	—N/a
9 September 2022	Trenton	United States	CURE Insurance Arena	Mastodon; Spiritbox
10 September 2022	Elmont	United States	UBS Arena	Mastodon; Spiritbox
12 September 2022	Providence	United States	Amica Mutual Pavilion	Mastodon; Spiritbox
13 September 2022	Bangor	United States	Cross Insurance Center	Mastodon; Spiritbox
15 September 2022	Quebec City	Canada	Videotron Centre	Mastodon; Spiritbox
16 September 2022	Laval	Canada	Place Bell	Mastodon; Spiritbox
17 September 2022	Toronto	Canada	Coca-Cola Coliseum	Mastodon; Spiritbox
19 September 2022	Saginaw	United States	Dow Event Center	Mastodon; Spiritbox
20 September 2022	Youngstown	United States	Covelli Centre	Mastodon; Spiritbox
21 September 2022	Peoria	United States	Carver Arena	Mastodon; Spiritbox
23 September 2022	Green Bay	United States	Resch Center	Mastodon; Spiritbox

List of 2023 concerts, showing date, city, country, venue, and opening acts
Date	City	Country	Venue	Support Act(s)
21 May 2023	Rouen	France	Zénith de la Métropole Rouen Normandie	Spiritbox
22 May 2023	Lyon	France	Halle Tony Garnier	Spiritbox
23 May 2023	Toulouse	France	Zenith	Spiritbox; Lucifer
25 May 2023	Rennes	France	Le Liberté	Spiritbox; Lucifer
26 May 2023	Lille	France	Zénith de Lille	Spiritbox; Lucifer
28 May 2023	Strasbourg	France	Zénith de Strasbourg	Spiritbox; Lucifer
29 May 2023	Milan	Italy	Ippodromo di San Siro	Death SS; Lucifer
30 May 2023	Nice	France	Palais Nikaïa	Spiritbox; Lucifer
1 June 2023 (Note: The concert on 1 June 2023 was a part of Primavera Sound.)	Barcelona	Spain	Parc del Fòrum	—N/a
3 June 2023	Nantes	France	Zénith Nantes Métropole	Lucifer
4 June 2023	Amsterdam	Netherlands	AFAS Live	Halestorm
6 June 2023	Berlin	Germany	Velodrom	Halestorm
8 June 2023 (Note: The concert on 8 June 2023 was a part of Mystic Festival.)	Gdańsk	Poland	Gdańsk Shipyard	—N/a
10 June 2023 (Note: The concert on 10 June 2023 was a part of Sweden Rock Festival.)	Sölvesborg	Sweden	Norje Havsbad	—N/a
11 June 2023 (Note: The concert on 11 June 2023 was a part of Download Festival.)	Leicestershire	England	Donington Park	—N/a
12 June 2023	Esch-sur-Alzette	Luxembourg	Rockhal	Halestorm; Lucifer
13 June 2023	Bochum	Germany	RuhrCongress	Halestorm
15 June 2023 (Note: The concert on 15 June 2023 was a part of Graspop Metal Meeting.)	Antwerp	Belgium	Dessel	—N/a
19 June 2023	Hamburg	Germany	Barclays Arena	The Hellacopters
20 June 2023	Neu-Ulm	Germany	Ratiopharm Arena	The Hellacopters
22 June 2023 (Note: The concert on 22 June 2023 was a part of Basinfirefest.)	Spálené Poříčí	Czech Republic	Festivalový areál	—N/a
23 June 2023 (Note: The concert on 23 June 2023 was a part of Tons of Rock.)	Oslo	Norway	Ekebergsletta	—N/a
25 June 2023 (Note: The concert on 25 June 2023 was a part of Athens Rocks Festival.)	Athens	Greece	Athens Olympic Complex	—N/a
28 June 2023 (Note: The concert on 28 June 2023 was a part of Resurrection Festival.)	Viveiro	Spain	Campo de Fútbol Celeiro	—N/a
1 July 2023 (Note: The concert on 1 July 2023 was a part of Provinssi Festival.)	Seinäjoki	Finland	Törnävänsaari	—N/a
2 July 2023 (Note: The concert on 2 July 2023 was a part of Tuska Open Air.)	Helsinki	Finland	Suvilahti	—N/a
2 August 2023	Concord	United States	Concord Pavilion	Amon Amarth
4 August 2023	Auburn	United States	White River Amphitheatre	Amon Amarth
5 August 2023	Airway Heights	United States	BECU Live	Amon Amarth
7 August 2023	West Valley City	United States	USANA Health Sciences Amphitheatre	Amon Amarth
8 August 2023	Denver	United States	Fiddler's Green Amphitheatre	Amon Amarth
11 August 2023	St. Louis	United States	Hollywood Casino Amphitheatre	Amon Amarth
12 August 2023	Milwaukee	United States	American Family Insurance Amphitheater	Amon Amarth
14 August 2023	Clarkston	United States	Pine Knob Music Theatre	Amon Amarth
15 August 2023	Chicago	United States	Huntington Bank Pavilion	Amon Amarth
16 August 2023	Cincinnati	United States	PNC Pavilion	Amon Amarth
18 August 2023	Syracuse	United States	St. Joseph's Health Amphitheater	Amon Amarth
19 August 2023	Mansfield	United States	Xfinity Center	Amon Amarth
20 August 2023	Bridgeport	United States	Hartford Healthcare Amphitheater	Amon Amarth
22 August 2023	Indianapolis	United States	TCU Amphitheater at White River State Park	Amon Amarth
23 August 2023	Burgettstown	United States	The Pavilion at Star Lake	Amon Amarth
24 August 2023	Bristow	United States	Jiffy Lube Live	Amon Amarth
25 August 2023	Camden	United States	Freedom Mortgage Pavilion	Amon Amarth
27 August 2023	Nashville	United States	Ascend Amphitheater	Amon Amarth
2 September 2023	The Woodlands	United States	Cynthia Woods Mitchell Pavilion	Amon Amarth
3 September 2023	Austin	United States	Germania Insurance Amphitheater	Amon Amarth
5 September 2023	Irving	United States	The Pavilion at Toyota Music Factory	Amon Amarth
7 September 2023	Albuquerque	United States	Isleta Amphitheater	Amon Amarth
8 September 2023	Phoenix	United States	Talking Stick Resort Amphitheatre	Amon Amarth
11 September 2023 (Note: The concerts on 11 and 12 September 2023 were filmed and recorded for the concert film, Rite Here Rite Now.)	Inglewood	United States	Kia Forum	—N/a
12 September 2023	Inglewood	United States	Kia Forum	—N/a
18 September 2023	Mexico City	Mexico	Palacio de los Deportes	Tribulation
20 September 2023	São Paulo	Brazil	Espaço Unimed	Crypta
21 September 2023	São Paulo	Brazil	Espaço Unimed	Crypta
24 September 2023	Buenos Aires	Argentina	Movistar Arena	Poseidotica
27 September 2023	Santiago	Chile	Movistar Arena	Pentagram Chile
3 October 2023	Sydney	Australia	Qudos Bank Arena	Southeast Desert Metal
4 October 2023	Melbourne	Australia	John Cain Arena	Southeast Desert Metal
7 October 2023	Brisbane	Australia	Brisbane Entertainment Centre	Southeast Desert Metal

=== Cancelled dates ===
List of cancelled concerts showing date, city, country, venue, and reason for cancellation
Date	City	Country	Venue	Reason
21 April 2022	Leipzig	Germany	Arena Leipzig	—N/a
29 August 2023	Simpsonville	United States	CCNB Amphitheatre	Due to severe weather conditions, this concert was stopped during Amon Amarth's set and cancelled hours later. Though initially rescheduled for 31 August, the rescheduled date too was ultimately cancelled as a result of equipment being damaged by rain.
30 August 2023	Jacksonville	United States	Daily's Place	Hurricane Idalia
31 August 2023	Tampa	United States	MidFlorida Credit Union Amphitheatre	Hurricane Idalia
