= Rite Here Rite Now =

Concert film by Alex Ross Perry and Tobias Forge

- Theatrical release poster
- Directed by: Tobias Forge; Alex Ross Perry; Jim Parsons
- Written by: Tobias Forge
- Produced by: Kristen Mulderig; Rick Sales; Craig Butta; Jonas Åkerlund
- Starring: Ghost; Tobias Forge; Maralyn Facey; Alan Ursillo; Ashley McBride; Kevin "Jesus" Kaufmann
- Cinematography: Robert Kolodny
- Edited by: Robert Kolodny
- Music by: Ghost
- Production companies: Loma Vista Recordings; Popecorn Cinematic Pictures; Veeps
- Distributed by: Trafalgar Releasing
- Release date: June 20, 2024
- Running time: 145 minutes
- Country: United States
- Language: English
- Box office: $4.8 million

Rite Here Rite Now is a 2024 American concert film directed by Tobias Forge and Alex Ross Perry. It features the Swedish rock band Ghost performing at the Kia Forum in Inglewood, California, on the final two North American dates of their 2023 Re-Imperatour concert tour. The live concert footage was directed by Jim Parsons. The film includes a narrative story based on a web series produced by the band, which incorporates fictional characters and lore surrounding them.

Rite Here Rite Now was released in cinemas globally by Trafalgar Releasing on June 20 and 22, 2024.

== Synopsis ==
The film documents two Ghost shows performed during their Re-Imperatour concert tour, which were held at the Kia Forum in Inglewood, California, on September 11 and 12, 2023. Unlike other shows on the tour, a strict no-phone policy was implemented for attendees of the Kia Forum shows to prevent recordings and flash photography.

In addition to concert footage, Rite Here Rite Now is intercut with a narrative story based on fictional lore surrounding the band. Throughout the band's career, frontman Tobias Forge has performed under different fictional personas portrayed as popes belonging to and promoting a Satanic ministry; for Ghost's album Impera and its two subsequent tours, Forge performed as "Papa Emeritus IV". In Rite Here Rite Now, Papa Emeritus IV repeatedly ventures backstage during the concert to visit his associate, Sister Imperator, and to converse with the spirit of Papa Nihil, who is depicted as having served as Ghost's frontman in the 1960s. Sister Imperator and Papa Nihil are revealed to be the parents of Papa Emeritus IV. After the concert, Sister Imperator dies, and Papa Emeritus IV is promoted to the title of Frater Imperator, a role which sees him acting as an overseer for the ministry; he awaits a new heir to the papacy, who is unseen.

== Cast and personnel ==
- Tobias Forge as Papa Emeritus IV
- Alan Ursillo as Papa Nihil
- Liz Fenning as Young Sister
- Maralyn Facey as Sister Imperator
- Justin Andrews as Young Papa Nihil
- Elester Latham as Mr. Psaltarian
- Michael Beaudry as Mortician
- Britta Peterson as Nurse
- Larissa Gampaoli Portin as Paramedic 1
- Christopher Edrington as Paramedic 2
- Gia and Nick Varo as Twins
- Harold Mintz as Janitor

=== Ghouls and Ghoulettes ===
- Hayden Scott – drums, musical director
- Per Eriksson – lead guitar
- Cosmo Sylvan/Cos Sylvan (Artist name on Spotify/Apple Music) – bass guitar
- Justin/Jutty Taylor (Artist name on Spotify/Apple Music) – guitar, percussion, backing vocals
- Laura Scarborough – keyboards
- Mad Gallica – piano, backing vocals
- Olivia Morreale – backing vocals
- Randy Moore – rhythm guitar

=== Chamber Ghoulettes ===
- Sharlotte Gibson – backing vocals
- Alin Melyk-Adamyan – piano
- Sophia "Suuvi" Bacelar – cello
- Tina Guo – cello

== Production ==
Ghost frontman Tobias Forge stated that when the band signed with their label, Loma Vista Recordings, the CEO Tom Whalley asked what the story of the band was. Forge responded, "if he wanted a story, I could come up with one. This film is the fruit of that conversation."

Director Alex Ross Perry has stated that the inspirations for the film range from the Sex Pistols film The Great Rock 'n' Roll Swindle to the work of Ralph Bakshi to Kiss's Alive II.

Director Perry and cinematographer/editor Robert Kolodny have worked on several Ghost releases, including the music video for the band's cover of the Genesis song "Jesus He Knows Me" as well as the mockumentary Metal Myths: Ghost Pt. 2.

== Release ==
The film received a theatrical release on June 20, 2024, by Trafalgar Releasing. A single, "The Future Is a Foreign Land", which plays during the film's end credits, was released on June 21, 2024.

Music videos for the 2019 track "Mary on a Cross", which was first shown in the film, and "The Future Is a Foreign Land" were released on July 25, 2024, a day before the set release date for the movie's soundtrack.

The soundtrack for the film was released on July 26 by Loma Vista Recordings. The film was released on 4K/Ultra HD, Blu-ray, and DVD on December 13, 2024.

== Reception ==
Jeff Podoshen of Metal Injection gave the film a score of ten out of ten, praising the setlist and writing: "Carefully curated crowd shots that show the sheer joy of the fans, and the up-close shots of the band make you feel like you're in the ritual yourself. Meshed with the crowded movie theater, with many folks wearing their Ghost Sunday best, creates a truly devotional experience."

Metal Hammer's Merlin Alderslade gave the film five out of five stars, calling it "an instant classic and an absolute triumph".

Catherine Bray of The Guardian gave the film a score of two out of five stars, calling it "a pretty tame film, which fits the band's goofy brand of soft metal"; she criticized the comedic backstage segments interspersed throughout the film, characterizing them as likely to only "presumably satisfy the [band's] faithful fanbase".

== Soundtrack ==
Rite Here Rite Now (Original Motion Picture Soundtrack)

Soundtrack album by Ghost
- Released: July 26, 2024
- Genres: Soundtrack; hard rock
- Length: 90:10
- Language: English
- Label: Loma Vista
- Producer: Gene Walker

Singles from Rite Here Rite Now (Original Motion Picture Soundtrack)
- 1. "Absolution" Released: May 9, 2024; 2. "The Future Is a Foreign Land" Released: June 21, 2024

The soundtrack album was recorded by Swedish rock band Ghost, mostly during the shows featured in the film, and was released on July 26, 2024, through Loma Vista Recordings. On May 9, the band released the film version of the track "Absolution", originally from the album Meliora, as a single. Without prior announcement, the track "The Future Is a Foreign Land" was released on June 21 as a single and is said to be the third song from the "1969 sessions", from which the two songs on the Seven Inches of Satanic Panic EP originated. All the other tracks were recorded during the Imperatour concerts at the Kia Forum.

=== Track listing ===
| No. | Title | Writer(s) | Length |
|---|---|---|---|
| 1. | "Imperium" | A Ghoul Writer | 1:40 |
| 2. | "Kaisarion" | A Ghoul Writer; Joakim Berg | 4:57 |
| 3. | "Rats" | A Ghoul Writer; Tom Dalgety | 4:28 |
| 4. | "Faith" | A Ghoul Writer; Dalgety | 5:09 |
| 5. | "Spillways" | A Ghoul Writer; Salem Al Fakir; Vincent Pontare; Klas Åhlund | 4:39 |
| 6. | "Cirice" | A Ghoul Writer; Åhlund | 5:54 |
| 7. | "Absolution" | A Ghoul Writer; Åhlund; Indio Marcato | 5:08 |
| 8. | "Call Me Little Sunshine" | A Ghoul Writer; Max Grahn | 4:48 |
| 9. | "Watcher in the Sky" | A Ghoul Writer | 6:23 |
| 10. | "If You Have Ghosts" (chamber version) | Roger Kynard Erickson | 5:21 |
| 11. | "Twenties" | A Ghoul Writer; Al Fakir; Pontare | 5:34 |
| 12. | "Miasma" | A Ghoul Writer | 6:18 |
| 13. | "Mary on a Cross" | A Ghoul Writer; Al Fakir; Pontare | 4:58 |
| 14. | "Respite on the Spitalfields" | A Ghoul Writer; Åhlund; Berg | 7:11 |
| 15. | "Kiss the Go-Goat" | A Ghoul Writer; Al Fakir; Pontare | 3:20 |
| 16. | "Dance Macabre" | A Ghoul Writer; Al Fakir; Pontare | 5:28 |
| 17. | "Square Hammer" | A Ghoul Writer | 5:09 |
| 18. | "The Future Is a Foreign Land" | A Ghoul Writer; Al Fakir; Pontare | 3:45 |
| Total length: | | | 90:10 |

Notes

- The songs "Mummy Dust", "Year Zero", "Spöksonat/He Is", "Con Clavi Con Dio", and "Ritual" do not appear on the soundtrack release despite being performed at the recorded shows and being featured in the film. After the release of Rite Here Rite Now, The Future Is a Foreign Land was released on to the album, Seven Inches of Satanic Panic, in 2023-2024, whereas the album was originally released in 2019.
- Tobias Forge is credited as "A Ghoul Writer" and Martin Persner is credited as "Indio Marcato".

=== Charts ===
Chart performance for Rite Here Rite Now (Original Motion Picture Soundtrack)
| Chart (2024) | Peak position |
|---|---|
| Australian Albums (ARIA) | 12 |
| Austrian Albums (Ö3 Austria) | 7 |
| Belgian Albums (Ultratop Flanders) | 17 |
| Belgian Albums (Ultratop Wallonia) | 13 |
| Canadian Albums (Billboard) | 92 |
| Croatian International Albums (HDU) | 19 |
| Dutch Albums (Album Top 100) | 8 |
| Finnish Albums (Suomen virallinen lista) | 19 |
| French Albums (SNEP) | 18 |
| French Rock & Metal Albums (SNEP) | 11 |
| German Albums (Offizielle Top 100) | 6 |
| Hungarian Physical Albums (MAHASZ) | 17 |
| Italian Physical Albums (FIMI) | 10 |
| Polish Albums (ZPAV) | 20 |
| Scottish Albums (Official Charts) | 1 |
| Spanish Albums (Promusicae) | 23 |
| Swedish Albums (Sverigetopplistan) | 1 |
| Swiss Albums (Schweizer Hitparade) | 9 |
| UK Albums (Official Charts) | 10 |
| UK Compilation Albums (Official Charts) | 1 |
| UK Rock & Metal Albums (Official Charts) | 1 |
| US Billboard 200 | 21 |
| US Top Rock & Alternative Albums (Billboard) | 6 |

=== Certifications ===
Certifications for Rite Here Rite Now (Original Motion Picture Soundtrack)
| Region | Certification | Certified units/sales |
|---|---|---|
| Poland (ZPAV) | Gold | 15,000^{‡} |
^{‡} Sales+streaming figures based on certification alone.
