= Skeletour =

2025–2026 concert tour by Ghost

- Tour by Ghost
- Location: Europe; North America
- Associated album: Skeletá
- Start date: 15 April 2025
- End date: 23 February 2026
- Legs: 3
- No. of shows: 73

Ghost concert chronology
- Imperatour (2022–23); Skeletour (2025–2026)

Skeletour was a concert tour by the Swedish rock band Ghost, in support of their sixth studio album, Skeletá. The tour began on 15 April 2025 in Manchester, England, and concluded on 23 February 2026 in Inglewood, California.

== Background ==
The tour was announced in October 2024. The band's sixth studio album, Skeletá, was announced in March 2025, and was later released the following month on 25 April.

The tour brought in a "No Phone" policy for the concerts, in which attendees secured their phones and digital recording devices into Yondr pouches. In an interview with Blabbermouth.net, Forge stated that the policy was put in place, as heavy phone usage created a disconnected experience.

Following two performances in Mexico City, the band announced on 26 September 2025 that the two shows were filmed for a concert film. A second North American leg of the tour was announced three days later, on 29 September 2025, for January through February 2026.

== Set list ==
The following set list was performed in Manchester, England on 15 April 2025, and is not intended to represent a majority of the performances throughout the tour.

1. "Peacefield"
2. "Lachryma"
3. "Spirit"
4. "From the Pinnacle to the Pit"
5. "Majesty"
6. "The Future is a Foreign Land"
7. "Cirice"
8. "Darkness at the Heart of My Love"
9. "Satanized"
10. "Ritual"
11. "Umbra"
12. "Year Zero"
13. "He Is"
14. "Rats"
15. "Kiss the Go-Goat"
16. "Mummy Dust"
17. "Monstrance Clock"
  Encore
18. "Mary on a Cross"
19. "Dance Macabre"
20. "Square Hammer"

=== Alterations ===
- "Per Aspera ad Inferi" and "Satan Prayer" were added to the set list at the start of the first North American leg in Baltimore on 9 July 2025.

== Tour dates ==
List of 2025 concerts, showing date, city, country and venue
Date	City	Country	Venue
15 April 2025	Manchester	England	AO Arena
16 April 2025	Glasgow	Scotland	OVO Hydro
19 April 2025	London	England	The O2
20 April 2025	Birmingham	England	Utilita Arena
22 April 2025	Antwerp	Belgium	Sportpaleis
23 April 2025	Frankfurt	Germany	Festhalle Frankfurt
24 April 2025	Munich	Germany	Olympiahalle
26 April 2025	Lyon	France	LDLC Arena
27 April 2025	Toulouse	France	Zénith Toulouse Métropole
29 April 2025	Lisbon	Portugal	MEO Arena
3 May 2025	Zurich	Switzerland	Hallenstadion
4 May 2025	Milan	Italy	Unipol Forum
7 May 2025	Berlin	Germany	Uber Arena
8 May 2025	Amsterdam	Netherlands	Ziggo Dome
10 May 2025	Łódź	Poland	Atlas Arena
11 May 2025	Prague	Czech Republic	O2 Arena
13 May 2025	Paris	France	Accor Arena
14 May 2025	Oberhausen	Germany	Rudolf Weber-Arena
15 May 2025	Hanover	Germany	ZAG-Arena
17 May 2025	Copenhagen	Denmark	Royal Arena
20 May 2025	Tampere	Finland	Nokia Arena
22 May 2025	Linköping	Sweden	Saab Arena
23 May 2025	Sandviken	Sweden	Göransson Arena
24 May 2025	Oslo	Norway	Oslo Spektrum
9 July 2025	Baltimore	United States	CFG Bank Arena
11 July 2025	Atlanta	United States	State Farm Arena
12 July 2025	Tampa	United States	Amalie Arena
13 July 2025	Miami	United States	Kaseya Center
15 July 2025	Raleigh	United States	Lenovo Center
17 July 2025	Cleveland	United States	Rocket Mortgage FieldHouse
18 July 2025	Pittsburgh	United States	PPG Paints Arena
19 July 2025	Philadelphia	United States	Wells Fargo Center
21 July 2025	Boston	United States	TD Garden
22 July 2025	New York	United States	Madison Square Garden
24 July 2025	Detroit	United States	Little Caesars Arena
25 July 2025	Louisville	United States	KFC Yum! Center
26 July 2025	Nashville	United States	Bridgestone Arena
28 July 2025	Grand Rapids	United States	Van Andel Arena
29 July 2025	Milwaukee	United States	Fiserv Forum
30 July 2025	St. Louis	United States	Enterprise Center
1 August 2025	Rosemont	United States	Allstate Arena
2 August 2025	Saint Paul	United States	Xcel Energy Center
3 August 2025	Omaha	United States	CHI Health Center
5 August 2025	Kansas City	United States	T-Mobile Center
7 August 2025	Denver	United States	Ball Arena
9 August 2025	Las Vegas	United States	MGM Grand Garden Arena
10 August 2025	San Diego	United States	Viejas Arena
11 August 2025	Phoenix	United States	Footprint Center
14 August 2025	Austin	United States	Moody Center
15 August 2025	Fort Worth	United States	Dickies Arena
16 August 2025	Houston	United States	Toyota Center
24 September 2025	Mexico City	Mexico	Palacio de los Deportes
25 September 2025	Mexico City	Mexico	Palacio de los Deportes

List of 2026 concerts, showing date, city, country and venue
Date	City	Country	Venue
21 January 2026	Orlando	United States	Kia Center
22 January 2026	Jacksonville	United States	VyStar Veterans Memorial Arena
24 January 2026	Knoxville	United States	Thompson–Boling Arena
25 January 2026	Charlotte	United States	Spectrum Center
26 January 2026	Greenville	United States	Bon Secours Wellness Arena
28 January 2026	Uncasville	United States	Mohegan Sun Arena
30 January 2026	Montreal	Canada	Bell Centre
31 January 2026	Toronto	Canada	Scotiabank Arena
2 February 2026	Columbus	United States	Nationwide Arena
4 February 2026	Cincinnati	United States	Heritage Bank Center
5 February 2026	Peoria	United States	Peoria Civic Center
7 February 2026	Tulsa	United States	BOK Center
10 February 2026	Salt Lake City	United States	Delta Center
12 February 2026	Spokane	United States	Spokane Arena
14 February 2026	Vancouver	Canada	Rogers Arena
15 February 2026	Seattle	United States	Climate Pledge Arena
17 February 2026	Portland	United States	Moda Center
20 February 2026	Sacramento	United States	Golden 1 Center
21 February 2026	Anaheim	United States	Honda Center
23 February 2026	Inglewood	United States	Intuit Dome

=== Cancelled dates ===
List of cancelled concerts showing date, city, country, venue, and reason for cancellation
Date	City	Country	Venue	Reason
30 April 2025	Madrid	Spain	Palacio Vistalegre	Production issues
23 September 2025	Mexico City	Mexico	Palacio de los Deportes	Tobias Forge's food poisoning
