= Sanguivore II: Mistress of Death =

Studio album by Creeper
- Released: 31 October 2025
- Genres: Gothic rock, glam metal
- Length: 42:12
- Label: Spinefarm
- Producer: Tom Dalgety

Creeper chronology
Sanguivore (2023)	Sanguivore II: Mistress of Death (2025)

Singles from Sanguivore II: Mistress of Death
- 1. "Headstones" Released: 6 June 2025; 2. "Blood Magick (It's a Ritual)" Released: 6 August 2025; 3. "Prey for the Night" Released: 26 September 2025

Sanguivore II: Mistress of Death is the fourth album by the English rock band Creeper. A narrative and thematic sequel to the band's 2023 album Sanguivore, it was produced by Tom Dalgety and was released on 31 October 2025 by Spinefarm Records.

== Background ==
Creeper announced a sequel to their 2023 album Sanguivore at the end of a one-off show at Koko in London on 31 May 2025. A week later, "Headstones" was released as the first single and music video from the album. "Blood Magick (It's a Ritual)" followed two months later.

== Composition ==
Sanguivore II: Mistress of Death is a sequel to Sanguivore, released in 2023. According to Creeper frontman Will Gould, the album's narrative "follows a vampire rock band on a tour soaked in violence and excess"; speaking to Kerrang! at the time of the album's announcement, he explained that "This record takes place in the 1980s. It's about a vampire rock band on tour, and there's someone coming to get them. That's who the Mistress Of Death is." Stylistically, Gould noted that the band wanted to make the album "sleazier and sexier" than its predecessor, with inspirations including the music of Jim Steinman and Judas Priest.

== Track listing ==
All lyrics are written by William Gould.

Sanguivore II: Mistress of Death track listing
No.	Title	Music	Length
1.	"A Shadow Stirs" (featuring Patricia Morrison)	William Gould; Ian Miles; Tom Dalgety	1:16
2.	"Mistress of Death"	Gould; Miles; Dalgety	4:22
3.	"Blood Magick (It's a Ritual)"	Gould; Miles; Dalgety	4:13
4.	"Headstones"	Gould; Miles; Dalgety	3:01
5.	"Prey for the Night"	Gould; Miles; Dalgety; Xandy Barry	3:46
6.	"Daydreaming in the Dark"	Gould; Dalgety	3:40
7.	"Parasite"	Gould; Miles; Dalgety; Eric Gjerdrum; Andreas Werling	3:18
8.	"Razor Wire"	Gould; Dalgety	4:00
9.	"From the Depths Below"	Gould; Dalgety	0:31
10.	"The Black House"	Gould; Miles; Dalgety	4:04
11.	"The Crimson Bride"	Gould; Dalgety	3:34
12.	"Pavor Nocturnus" (featuring Patricia Morrison)	Gould; Dalgety	6:27

== Personnel ==
Credits adapted from Tidal.

=== Creeper ===
- Jake Fogarty – drums
- William Gould – vocals
- Hannah Greenwood – keyboards, vocals
- Ian Miles – guitar
- Lawrie Pattison – guitar
- Sean Scott – bass guitar

=== Additional contributors ===
- Tom Dalgety – production, mixing, keyboards (all tracks); vocals (tracks 4–12)
- Chantal Lewis-Brown – vocals
- Adam Klemens – conductor (4–12)

== Charts ==
Chart performance for Sanguivore II: Mistress of Death
Chart (2025)	Peak position
French Physical Albums (SNEP)	156
French Rock & Metal Albums (SNEP)	58
Scottish Albums (Official Charts)	14
UK Albums (Official Charts)	43
UK Rock & Metal Albums (Official Charts)	2
