= Headstones (song) =

Single by Creeper

from the album Sanguivore II: Mistress of Death
- Released: 6 June 2025
- Genre: Heavy metal
- Length: 3:01
- Label: Spinefarm
- Songwriters: Will Gould; Ian Miles; Tom Dalgety
- Producer: Tom Dalgety

Creeper singles chronology
"Black Heaven" (2023)	"Headstones" (2025)	"Blood Magick (It's a Ritual)" (2025)

"Headstones" is a song by English rock band Creeper. Written by the band's lead vocalist Will Gould, guitarist Ian Miles, and producer Tom Dalgety, it was released as the lead single from their upcoming fourth studio album, Sanguivore II: Mistress of Death, on 6 June 2025. The track is Creeper's first recording to feature guitarist Lawrie Pattison, who became an official member in 2024 after touring with the band since 2021, and also features additional vocals by Chantal Lewis-Brown.

== Background ==
At the end of a one-off show at Koko in London on 31 May 2025, Creeper announced that their next album would be a follow-up to 2023's Sanguivore entitled Sanguivore II: Mistress of Death. The day after the show, the band announced that the first single from the album would be released on 6 June, with the album to follow around "the Halloween season". The song's release was accompanied by a music video directed by Harry Steel, who previously directed "Lovers Led Astray".

== Composition ==
According to Creeper frontman Will Gould, "Headstones" introduces the narrative of Sanguivore II, which is centred around "a vampire rock band on a tour soaked in violence and excess ... exploring the dark perils of rock’n’roll, sins of the flesh, and pure evil". Stylistically, Gould described "Headstones" as "the fastest song on the record", comparing it to the work of speed metal band Motörhead; he also likened the composition of the chorus to those of "We're Not Gonna Take It" by Twisted Sister and "Rock and Roll All Nite" by Kiss, and noted the inclusion of "gospel-sounding singer" Chantal Lewis-Brown as being inspired by "Gimme Shelter" by the Rolling Stones. Kerrang! writer Nick Ruskell also noted the song's "duelling guitars", which he compared to Iron Maiden.

== Personnel ==
Creeper

- Will Gould — vocals
- Ian Miles — guitar
- Lawrie Pattison — guitar
- Sean Scott — bass
- Hannah Greenwood — keyboards, vocals
- Jake Fogarty — drums

Additional personnel

- Tom Dalgety — production, mixing, keyboards, vocals
- Adam Klemens — conductor
- Chantal Lewis-Brown — vocals
