= Popestar =

EP by Ghost
- Released: 16 September 2016
- Recorded: 2016
- Studios: Gardenia Studio, Linköping, SE
- Length: 23:34
- Label: Loma Vista
- Producer: Tom Dalgety

Ghost chronology
Meliora (2015)	Popestar (2016)	Prequelle (2018)

Singles from Popestar
- 1. "Square Hammer" Released: 12 September 2016

Popestar is the second EP by the Swedish rock band Ghost. It consists mainly of covers and was produced by Tom Dalgety. The EP was released on 16 September 2016, by Loma Vista Recordings. The band began the Popestar Tour of North America following its release.

== Background ==
Popestar consists almost entirely of covers. Ghost chose unexpected songs that differed from their own musical style.

The only original track on the EP, "Square Hammer", was conceived at the end of the sessions for the band's Meliora album. Because the concept of the album was already in place and the song had a different feeling, the band decided not to include it on the album. "Square Hammer" was released as a single on 12 September 2016, prior to the EP.

== Reception ==
Professional ratings
Review scores
Source	Rating
AllMusic	3.5/5 stars
Peek-a-Boo	80/100

Popestar debuted at No. 1 on Billboard's Top Rock Albums chart, becoming the first EP to reach the chart's top position. It sold 21,000 copies in its first week.

== Track listing ==
No.	Title	Writer(s)	Length
1.	"Square Hammer"	A Ghoul Writer	3:59
2.	"Nocturnal Me" (Echo & the Bunnymen cover)	Pete de Freitas; Les Pattinson; Will Sergeant; Ian McCulloch	5:13
3.	"I Believe" (Simian Mobile Disco cover)	Jas Shaw; Simon Lord; James Ford	4:06
4.	"Missionary Man" (Eurythmics cover)	Annie Lennox; David Stewart	3:42
5.	"Bible" (Imperiet cover)	Christian Falk; Fred Asp; Joakim Thåström; Per Hägglund	6:34
Total length:			23:34

== Personnel ==
=== Ghost ===
- Papa Emeritus III (Vocals)
- Nameless Ghouls:

Fire Element (Lead Guitar) Aether Element (Rhythm Guitar) Water Element (Bass) Earth Element (Drums) Air Element (Keyboards)

=== Additional personnel ===
- Sofia Kempe – backing vocals on "Missionary Man" and "Bible"
- Brian Reed – harmonica on "Missionary Man"

=== Technical ===
- Tom Dalgety – production, engineering, mixing
- Niels Nielsen – additional engineering, programming
- Markus Krona – assistant
- Joe LaPorta – mastering
- Necropolitus Cracoviensis Zbigniew Bielak II – cover artwork

== Charts ==
Chart (2016)	Peak position
Canadian Albums (Billboard)	7
Finnish Albums (Suomen virallinen lista)	12
French Albums (SNEP)	44
New Zealand Heatseekers Albums (RMNZ)	7
Scottish Albums (Official Charts)	32
Swedish Albums (Sverigetopplistan)	3
UK Albums (Official Charts)	85
US Billboard 200	16
