= Popestar Tour =

2016–17 concert tour by Ghost

- Tour by Ghost
- Location: Europe; North America; South America
- Associated album: Popestar
- Start date: September 16, 2016
- End date: September 30, 2017
- Legs: 5
- No. of shows: 119

Ghost concert chronology
- Black to the Future (2015–2016); Popestar Tour (2016–2017); Rats! on the Road (2018)

The Popestar Tour was a concert tour by Swedish rock band Ghost in support of their second EP, Popestar. The EP was released on September 16, 2016, which coincided with the first show of the tour in Rochester, New York. They toured Europe in the spring of 2017, followed by a tour as openers for Iron Maiden. The tour concluded on 30 September 2017.

== Special changes ==
- The band's cover of Imperiet's "Bible" was performed with a choir at their Stockholm show on 28 April 2017.
- A 20-piece children's choir joined them for "Monstrance Clock" at the end of their Bloodstock Festival show on 12 August 2017.
- During the final show on September 30, 2017, Papa Emeritus III was dragged off stage during the final song. A new incarnation called "Papa Emeritus Zero" was introduced on stage, later named "Papa Nihil".

== Tour dates ==
List of 2016 concerts
Date	City	Country	Venue
September 16, 2016	Rochester	United States	Main Street Armory
September 19, 2016	Pittsburgh	United States	Stage AE
September 21, 2016	Cleveland	United States	Masonic Auditorium
September 23, 2016	Memphis	United States	Minglewood Hall
September 27, 2016	Tulsa	United States	Brady Theater
September 28, 2016	St. Louis	United States	The Pageant
September 30, 2016	Kansas City	United States	Arvest Bank at Midland Theatre
October 1, 2016	Madison	United States	Sonic Boom Festival
October 2, 2016	Louisville	United States	Louder Than Life
October 3, 2016	Detroit	United States	The Fillmore
October 4, 2016	Kalamazoo	United States	State Theatre
October 5, 2016	Cedar Rapids	United States	Paramount Theatre
October 7, 2016	Denver	United States	Paramount Theatre
October 8, 2016	Salt Lake City	United States	The Complex
October 9, 2016	Missoula	United States	Wilma Theatre
October 11, 2016	Calgary	Canada	MacEwan Hall
October 13, 2016	Vancouver	Canada	Vogue Theatre
October 14, 2016	Seattle	United States	Moore Theatre
October 15, 2016	Eugene	United States	McDonald Theater
October 16, 2016	Portland	United States	Roseland Theater
October 18, 2016	Riverside	United States	Riverside Municipal Auditorium
October 20, 2016	Los Angeles	United States	The Wiltern
October 21, 2016	Los Angeles	United States	The Wiltern
October 22, 2016	Las Vegas	United States	Brooklyn Bowl
October 23, 2016	Sacramento	United States	Discovery Park
October 25, 2016	Phoenix	United States	Comerica Theatre
October 27, 2016	Lubbock	United States	City Bank Auditorium
October 28, 2016	San Antonio	United States	Aztec Theater
October 31, 2016	Little Rock	United States	Metroplex
November 2, 2016	Orlando	United States	Hard Rock Live
November 3, 2016	Miami Beach	United States	Fillmore
November 4, 2016	Jacksonville	United States	Florida Theatre
November 5, 2016	Charlotte	United States	Fillmore
November 7, 2016	Raleigh	United States	The Ritz
November 9, 2016	Toronto	Canada	Queen Elizabeth Theatre
November 10, 2016	Toronto	Canada	Queen Elizabeth Theatre
November 11, 2016	Montreal	Canada	Métropolis
November 12, 2016	Brooklyn	United States	Kings Theatre

List of 2017 concerts
Date	City	Country	Venue
March 24, 2017	Norwich	England	Norwich UEA
March 25, 2017	Cardiff	Wales	The Great Hall
March 26, 2017	London	England	The Forum
March 28, 2017	Leeds	England	O2 Academy
March 29, 2017	Glasgow	Scotland	O2 ABC
March 31, 2017	Manchester	England	Apollo
April 1, 2017	Birmingham	England	O2 Academy
April 2, 2017	Brighton	England	Dome
April 4, 2017	Luxembourg	Luxembourg	Rockhal
April 5, 2017	Cologne	Germany	E-Werk
April 6, 2017	Amsterdam	Netherlands	Heineken Music Hall
April 8, 2017	Hamburg	Germany	Docks
April 9, 2017	Wiesbaden	Germany	Schlachtof
April 10, 2017	Brussels	Belgium	Ancienne Belgique
April 11, 2017	Paris	France	Olympia
April 13, 2017	Barcelona	Spain	Razzmatazz
April 14, 2017	Madrid	Spain	Barclaycard Center
April 15, 2017	Lisbon	Portugal	MEO Arena
April 16, 2017	Bilbao	Spain	BEC
April 18, 2017	Zürich	Switzerland	Volkshaus
April 19, 2017	Milan	Italy	Alcatraz
April 20, 2017	Vienna	Austria	Gasometer
April 21, 2017	Warsaw	Poland	Stodola
April 23, 2017	Munich	Germany	Kesselhaus
April 25, 2017	Berlin	Germany	Huxleys
April 26, 2017	Copenhagen	Denmark	Valby-Hallen
April 27, 2017	Oslo	Norway	Oslo Spektrum
April 28, 2017	Stockholm	Sweden	Hovet
April 30, 2017	Helsinki	Finland	Ice Hall
May 6, 2017	Buenos Aires	Argentina	Tecnópolis (Note: Maximus Festival)
May 8, 2017	Buenos Aires	Argentina	Teatro Vorterix
May 10, 2017	Porto Alegre	Brazil	Pepsi On Stage
May 13, 2017	São Paulo	Brazil	Autódromo José Carlos Pace
June 3, 2017	Bristow	United States	Jiffy Lube Live
June 4, 2017	Philadelphia	United States	Wells Fargo Center
June 6, 2017	Albany	United States	Palace Theatre (Note: Headline show)
June 7, 2017	Newark	United States	Prudential Center
June 8, 2017	Norfolk	United States	The NorVa
June 9, 2017	Charlotte	United States	PNC Music Pavilion
June 10, 2017	Atlanta	United States	The Tabernacle
June 11, 2017	Tampa	United States	Amalie Arena
June 13, 2017	Nashville	United States	Bridgestone Arena
June 14, 2017	Louisville	United States	The Louisville Palace
June 15, 2017	Chicago	United States	Hollywood Casino Amphitheater
June 16, 2017	St. Paul	United States	Xcel Energy Center
June 17, 2017	Fargo	United States	Fargo Civic Center
June 19, 2017	Oklahoma City	United States	Chesapeake Arena
June 21, 2017	Houston	United States	Toyota Center
June 22, 2017	Corpus Christi	United States	The Pavilion at Concert Street
June 23, 2017	Dallas	United States	American Airlines Center
June 24, 2017	San Antonio	United States	AT&T Center
June 26, 2017	Midland	United States	La Hacienda
June 27, 2017	Albuquerque	United States	Isleta Amphitheater
June 28, 2017	Phoenix	United States	Talking Stick Resort Arena
June 30, 2017	Fresno	United States	Rainbow Ballroom
July 1, 2017	San Bernardino	United States	San Manuel Amphitheater
July 2, 2017	San Francisco	United States	The Warfield Theatre
July 3, 2017	Las Vegas	United States	T-Mobile Arena
July 5, 2017	Oakland	United States	Oracle Arena
July 7, 2017	Salt Lake City	United States	USANA Amphitheater
July 8, 2017	Denver	United States	Fillmore Auditorium
July 9, 2017	Lincoln	United States	Pinnacle Bank Arena
July 11, 2017	Kansas City	United States	Sprint Center
July 12, 2017	St. Louis	United States	Hollywood Casino Amphitheater
July 13, 2017	Indianapolis	United States	Egyptian Room at the Old National Centre
July 14, 2017	Fort Wayne	United States	Embassy Theater
July 15, 2017	Toronto	Canada	Budweiser Stage
July 16, 2017	Quebec City	Canada	Videotron Centre
July 18, 2017	New Haven	United States	College Street Music Hall
July 19, 2017	Mansfield	United States	Xfinity Center
July 20, 2017	Philadelphia	United States	Fillmore
July 21, 2017	Brooklyn	United States	Barclays Center
July 22, 2017	Brooklyn	United States	Barclays Center
August 11, 2017	Kortrijk	Belgium	Alcatraz
August 12, 2017	Walton-on-Trent	England	Bloodstock Open Air
September 29, 2017	Stockholm	Sweden	Gröna Lund
September 30, 2017	Gothenburg	Sweden	Liseberg (Note: Final show with Papa Emeritus III)

=== Box office ===
Venue	City	Attendance	Revenue
Metropolis	Montreal	2,213 / 2,250	$63,890
Autodromo de Interlagos	São Paulo	32,384 / 35,000	$2,743,850
Palace Theatre	Albany	1,314 / 2,807	$48,910
Teatro Vorterix	Buenos Aires	1,323 / 1,323	$75,523
The Fillmore	Denver	2,240 / 3,600	$70,322

== Opening bands ==
- Marissa Nadler – Metroplex, Little Rock (October 31, 2016)
- Kvelertak – Gröna Lund, Stockholm (September 29, 2017)
