= Prequelle =

Studio album by Ghost
- Released: 1 June 2018
- Recorded: 2017–2018
- Studios: Artery Studios, Stockholm, Sweden; Psalm Studio, Bath, England; Westlake Studios, Los Angeles, California
- Genres: Hard rock; arena rock; heavy metal; progressive rock; pop rock
- Length: 41:43
- Label: Loma Vista
- Producer: Tom Dalgety

Ghost chronology
Popestar (2016)	Prequelle (2018)	Seven Inches of Satanic Panic (2019)

Singles from Prequelle
- 1. "Rats" Released: 13 April 2018; 2. "Dance Macabre" Released: 18 May 2018; 3. "Faith" Released: 20 December 2018

Prequelle is the fourth studio album by the Swedish rock band Ghost. It was released on 1 June 2018 and produced by Tom Dalgety. The album's first single, "Rats", was released ahead of the album on 13 April, and as of 28 July, had peaked at number one for seven weeks on the Billboard Mainstream Rock Songs chart. The second single, "Dance Macabre", later topped the same chart for two weeks as well. The album marked the band's strongest selling debut to date, landing at number 3 on the Billboard 200, selling 66,000 copies in its first week, with 61,000 of those being "traditional" album sales. The album's themes include medieval times and the Black Death, along with more contemporary subject matter.

"Prequelle" was nominated for the Best Rock Album Grammy Award at the 61st annual awards ceremony and the Swedish Grammis Award in the category of hard rock/metal.

The album was released with five different versions of the cover art, each with the rider and horse in the foreground placed in a different position.

== Background ==
Prequelle is the fourth studio album by Ghost, and the first to be recorded since the band's leader was officially confirmed to be Tobias Forge. Produced by Tom Dalgety, recording sessions began in 2017 at Artery Studios in Stockholm, while mixing began at Westlake Studios in West Hollywood in January 2018.

Forge stated that in contrast to the "very, very lavish, stupid sort of procedure" used to record the previous album Meliora, they "streamlined down a lot of things" for Prequelle. Most of the recording was done by only he and Dalgety, thanks in part to Dalgety being able to engineer the album in addition to producing it. When they needed a drummer or pianist they simply called in a session musician who left upon completing their part. This made the whole process "very relaxed" and "focused". However, the two did feel the pressure of living up to the success of the previous album; "I just try to find some sort of middle ground where you acknowledge it but try not to be blinded by it [...] but I was definitely not caving in because of that pressure. It was not an angst-filled recording. The recording was actually very nice. It was good – we felt that what we were doing was good."

On 31 March 2018, a video titled "Ghost – Chapter One: New Blood" was released on the Ghost YouTube channel as an advertisement for the album and for the new character frontman Forge would play, Cardinal Copia.

Three singles were released for the album, "Rats" on 13 April 2018 (Nominated for 'Best Rock Song' at the 61st Grammy Awards), "Dance Macabre" on 18 May 2018, and "Faith".

== Music and themes ==
Prequelle has been described as hard rock, arena rock, heavy metal, doom metal, progressive rock, and pop rock. It includes 1970s and 80s influences such as Blue Öyster Cult, Boston, ABBA, and hair metal. Forge had the theme for Prequelle planned out for years, dating to even before Meliora. He described the theme as "survival through a tumultuous time of your existence basically being threatened" and the concept of "death and doom". He wanted to make a record about the Plague and the Black Death, which led to one-third of the population of Europe dying. But he said it also led to "mortality issues" such as memento mori and "seize the day" because the rest of the population survived.

Forge also said that it is themed around "medieval times, but it's definitely clinging onto a lot of very current things." He remarked that in recent years many rock elders have died, such as Ronnie James Dio, David Bowie, Prince and especially Lemmy, which affected him much more that he thought they would; "It's made me want to be a little bit more attentive when it comes to trying to make sure that you're making the best of the opportunities that you have with your seniors. That is something that has affected me and this record a lot."

The opening track "Ashes" features Minou Forge, Tobias' daughter, singing "Ring a Ring o' Roses", a nursery rhyme said to have originated during the Plague.

"Rats" is about something "spreading as wildfire and completely destroying things quicker than you know," like the Black Death.

In another plague reference, "Dance Macabre" aims to capture a "joyous nocturnal sort of life in a disco song", such as people excessively partying because they know they are going to die.

Forge wrote the string intro of "Pro Memoria" a few years earlier than this album. He and Meliora producer Klas Åhlund played with the idea of having a "sort of Brian May guitar symphony" with it on that album, but did not have the time. Feeling it would make a good start for a new song, Forge transcribed the notes from his demo, which was done with strings on a keyboard, and sent it to a conductor who recorded it in finality.

The closing track "Life Eternal" asks if you were given the choice to live forever, "Would you want to do that?" Forge wanted to explore the use of the piano on Prequelle, citing "Life Eternal" he said "I wanted it be very ambitious, almost classical, and the piano gives that song air and clarity..."

== Reception ==
Professional ratings
Aggregate scores
Source	Rating
AnyDecentMusic?	7.4/10
Metacritic	81/100
Review scores
Source	Rating
AllMusic	4.0/5 stars
Blabbermouth.net	9/10
Exclaim!	7/10
Hardwired	4.5/5 stars
Kerrang!	4/5 stars
Metal Hammer	9/10
Metal Injection	7.5/10
PopMatters	9/10 stars
Punknews.org	4.5/5 stars
Rolling Stone	3.5/5 stars

Prequelle received critical acclaim upon its release. At Metacritic, which assigns a normalized rating out of 100 to reviews from mainstream publications, the album received an average score of 81, which indicates "universal acclaim", based on 9 reviews. At the end of 2018, Revolver and Metal Hammer named it the best album of the year. Thom Jurek at AllMusic claimed that, "Ghost deliver fully on the promises of earlier records. Their strengths – including one for imitation – are fully assembled and focused in an exercise of irresistible arena rock excess without sounding like a pastiche." Adrien Begrand of PopMatters wrote that Prequelle "subverts metal clichés; it has a strong sense of history, but at the same time it searches for new ideas within that framework" and called it "one of the cleverest heavy metal records in recent memory."

Metal Injection's Cody Davis cited "Dance Macabre" as the album's best track, but found the songs that follow it to be hit or miss. He completed his review by saying "While Prequelle has its misses, there is more good than bad with this album – and those good moments are excellent and damn catchy. This is a band coming into global domination so the process is bound to have its hitches at times." Joe Smith-Engelhardt of Exclaim! wrote that the album "expertly builds momentum, only to be bogged down by uninspiring tracks" and suggested that "With a bit better pacing and fewer drawn-out moments between songs, the record could have been the best of their career."

== Awards and nominations ==
Year	Ceremony	Award	Result
2019	Grammy Awards (61st)	Best Rock Album	Nominated
2019	Grammis (Sweden)	Best Hardrock/Metal Record of the Year	Nominated
2019	Kerrang! Awards	Best Album	Won

== Track listing ==
All writing credited to "A Ghoul Writer" in the booklet. Actual writing credits adapted from ASCAP.

No.	Title	Writer(s)	Length
1.	"Ashes"	Tobias Forge	1:21
2.	"Rats"	Forge; Tom Dalgety	4:21
3.	"Faith"	Forge; Dalgety	4:29
4.	"See the Light"	Forge; Dimitri Tikovoi; Dalgety	4:05
5.	"Miasma" (instrumental)	Forge	5:17
6.	"Dance Macabre"	Forge; Salem Al Fakir; Vincent Pontare	3:39
7.	"Pro Memoria"	Forge; Jesse Saint John; Niclas Frisk; Sarah Hudson	5:39
8.	"Witch Image"	Forge; Suzy Shinn; Dalgety	3:30
9.	"Helvetesfönster" (instrumental)	Forge, Mikael Åkerfeldt	5:55
10.	"Life Eternal"	Forge; Al Fakir; Pontare	3:27
Total length:			41:43

Exalted edition: limited 7" vinyl / deluxe CD / download
No.	Title	Writer(s)	Length
1.	"It's a Sin" (Pet Shop Boys cover)	Neil Tennant; Chris Lowe	4:40
2.	"Avalanche" (Leonard Cohen cover)	Leonard Cohen	3:46
Total length:			8:26

== Personnel ==
Credits adapted from the album's liner notes.

=== Ghost ===
- Cardinal Copia
- Papa Nihil
- A Group of Nameless Ghouls

=== Additional personnel ===
- Ludvig Kennberg – drums
- Steve Moore – synthesizers
- Salem Al Fakir – piano, keyboards
- Mark Williams – choir vocals
- Deryn Edwards – choir vocals
- Minou Forge – vocals (1)
- Gavin Fitzjohn – saxophone (5)
- Davide Rossi – orchestration (7)
- Christopher May – choir vocals (7)
- Mikael Åkerfeldt – acoustic guitar (9)
- Vincent Pontare – choir vocals (10)

=== Technical ===
- Tom Dalgety – production, recording, percussion, programming
- Andy Wallace – mixing
- Clif Norrell – engineer
- Greg Eliason – assistant
- Joe LaPorta – mastering
- Zbigniew Bielak – artwork
- Mikael Eriksson – photography, design

== Charts ==
=== Weekly charts ===
Weekly chart performance for Prequelle
Chart (2018)	Peak position
Australian Albums (ARIA)	7
Austrian Albums (Ö3 Austria)	6
Belgian Albums (Ultratop Flanders)	4
Belgian Albums (Ultratop Wallonia)	5
Canadian Albums (Billboard)	6
Czech Albums (ČNS IFPI)	18
Danish Albums (Hitlisten)	22
Dutch Albums (Album Top 100)	14
Finnish Albums (Suomen virallinen lista)	1
German Albums (Offizielle Top 100)	2
Hungarian Albums (MAHASZ)	26
Irish Albums (IRMA)	33
Italian Albums (FIMI)	36
New Zealand Heatseeker Albums (RMNZ)	1
Norwegian Albums (VG-lista)	1
Polish Albums (ZPAV)	33
Portuguese Albums (AFP)	10
Scottish Albums (Official Charts)	7
Spanish Albums (Promusicae)	5
Swedish Albums (Sverigetopplistan)	1
Swiss Albums (Schweizer Hitparade)	2
UK Albums (Official Charts)	10
UK Rock & Metal Albums (OCC)	1
US Billboard 200	3
US Top Rock Albums (Billboard)	1
US Top Hard Rock Albums (Billboard)	1

=== Year-end charts ===
Year-end chart performance for Prequelle
Chart (2018)	Position
Belgian Albums (Ultratop Flanders)	64
Belgian Albums (Ultratop Wallonia)	187
Swedish Albums (Sverigetopplistan)	18
US Top Rock Albums (Billboard)	66

== Certifications ==
Certifications for Prequelle
Region	Certification	Certified units/sales
Norway (IFPI Norway)	Gold	10,000^{‡}
Sweden (GLF)	Platinum	30,000^{‡}
United Kingdom (BPI)	Silver	60,000^{‡}
^{‡} Sales+streaming figures based on certification alone.
