= Rats (Ghost song) =

- This 7" picture disc release of the single features artwork of a rat king.

Single by Ghost

from the album Prequelle
- Released: April 13, 2018
- Recorded: 2017–2018
- Genre: Hard rock; heavy metal; arena rock
- Length: 4:21
- Label: Loma Vista
- Songwriters: Tobias Forge; Tom Dalgety
- Producer: Tom Dalgety

Ghost singles chronology
"Square Hammer" (2016)	"Rats" (2018)	"Dance Macabre" (2018)

Music video
- "Rats" on YouTube

"Rats" is a song by the Swedish rock band Ghost. It was released as the first single from their fourth album Prequelle. The track topped the Billboard Mainstream Rock Songs chart in July 2018, and was nominated for the Best Rock Song Grammy Award at the 61st Annual Grammy Awards.

== Background and release ==
The song debuted on April 12, 2018, on SiriusXM, and was officially released the following day. The song is the lead single from Ghost's fourth studio album, Prequelle, ahead of the album's release on June 1. As with prior music with the band, the song was created by Tobias Forge and a group of anonymous band members called "Nameless Ghouls". However, the song was the first to feature Forge's new alter ego stage name, Cardinal Copia, and was performed by a separate set of anonymous band members than prior material, with all prior band members leaving the band in 2017 following a lawsuit with Forge regarding pay. The song's music video was also released on April 13. Journalists noted that the video's style and dancing appeared to be influenced by Michael Jackson's music video for his song "Thriller".

== Themes and composition ==
Forge wrote the track to serve as "a big opening track that just blows people's minds immediately". The song was also written to be performed as a concert opener for large arena shows; he previously wrote "Square Hammer" for that purpose, and was successful with it, but didn't want to feel stuck always playing one particular song as a concert opener, as he perceived is what happened to the Rolling Stones with their song "Start Me Up". Greg Kennelty of Metal Injection described the song as sounding similar to 1980s Ozzy Osbourne, calling it "as heavy metal as you wanted it to be, with killer guitar solos, a badass drum intro, and riffs that sound like they might've been sitting in Ozzy's basement since the 80s." Forge himself confirmed that the song's creation was influenced by hearing Osbourne open up a concert with their song "I Don't Know" off of their 1980 album Blizzard of Ozz in the 1980s.

Lyrically, the song is about humanity's tendency to rush to judgement and mob mentality. Forge explained:

In many ways, [humanity has] gone back a few steps, because now it's closer to how it was back in the old days when people were standing at the square and all of a sudden, it's like in Monty Python's Life of Brian: "Stone him! Ra! Ra! Ra!" Public trials are very unsupervised and extremely swift and speak to the most primordial parts of us...It's actually not technically about rodents, it's about something spreading as wildfire and completely destroying things quicker than you know. It was how the plague started in Europe.

== Reception ==
Kennelty praised the song for being "darker" and "heavier" than the material from their prior album Meliora, concluding that "if you've been dying for something like Ghost's debut album Opus Eponymous with a more updated sound, then you're going to absolutely love 'Rats'." Vince Neilstein of MetalSucks similarly praised it for its catchy guitar riffs.

== Track listing ==
=== Digital download ===
Digital download
No.	Title	Length
1.	"Rats"	4:22

=== 7" single ===
Side A
No.	Title	Length
1.	"Rats"	4:22

Side B
No.	Title	Length
1.	"Rats (Instrumental)"	4:22

== Awards and nominations ==
Award nominations for "Rats"
Year	Ceremony	Award	Result
2019	Grammy Awards (61st)	Best Rock Song	Nominated

== Personnel ==
Credits adapted from liner notes.

- Tobias Forge – vocals (credited as "Cardinal Copia")
- A Group of Nameless Ghouls – lead guitar, rhythm guitar, bass guitar, drums, keyboards

== Charts ==
=== Weekly charts ===
Weekly chart performance for "Rats"
Chart (2018)	Peak position
Belgium (Ultratip Bubbling Under Flanders)	28
Canada Rock (Billboard)	23
Sweden (Sverigetopplistan)	83
US Hot Rock & Alternative Songs (Billboard)	16
US Rock & Alternative Airplay (Billboard)	11

=== Year-end charts ===
Year-end chart performance for "Rats"
Chart (2018)	Position
US Hot Rock Songs (Billboard)	50
US Rock Airplay (Billboard)	38

== Certifications ==
Certifications for "Rats"
Region	Certification	Certified units/sales
Canada (Music Canada)	Gold	40,000^{‡}
United States (RIAA)	Gold	500,000^{‡}
^{‡} Sales+streaming figures based on certification alone.
