= Tom Dalgety =

British record producer

- Born: Thomas Arthur Dalgety; Oxford, Oxfordshire, England
- Genre: Rock
- Occupations: Record producer; audio engineer
- Website: www.tomdalgety.com

Thomas Arthur Dalgety is an English record producer and audio engineer. He is most noted for his work with Pixies, Ghost, and Royal Blood. He was nominated for Grammy Awards in 2019 for his production work on the Ghost album Prequelle (Best Rock Album) and production and songwriting on the Ghost track "Rats" (Best Rock Song).

== Biography ==
Dalgety was born in Oxford, Oxfordshire. He grew up in Frome, Somerset, and began his career working at Rockfield Studios in Wales.

Royal Blood's self-titled debut album, produced by Dalgety and the band, was released in August 2014. It was nominated for the 2014 Mercury Prize for best album. It debuted at number one on the UK Albums Chart and went on to become certified as a platinum selling record (BPI). Dalgety also worked with the band on their second album How Did We Get So Dark?, which also went straight in at the top of the UK Albums Chart.

In 2015, Dalgety won "Breakthrough Producer of the Year" at the UK's Music Producers Guild (MPG) Awards.

In 2016, he was nominated for "British Producer of the Year" at the BRIT awards for his work on Royal Blood's debut self titled album.

In 2016, Dalgety produced the Popestar EP for Ghost, which went to number 1 in the Billboard Rock Album chart.

In January 2017, the single "Square Hammer" taken from the EP subsequently went to number 1 on Billboard′s Mainstream Rock Song Chart. And in February 2017 Ghost were awarded a Swedish Grammis Award with the Popestar EP winning the best Best Hard Rock/Metal album category.

Dalgety was nominated for "UK Producer of the Year" for the second time by the Music Producers Guild (MPG) Awards 2018. In late 2018, Dalgety was nominated for the 60th Annual Grammy Awards for his production work on the Ghost album Prequelle - nominated for Best Rock Album and his production and songwriting on the Ghost track "Rats" - nominated for Best Rock Song.

== Awards and nominations ==
- 2015 - won "Breakthrough Producer of the Year" at the Music Producers Guild (MPG) Awards
- 2015 - won "Music Producer/Engineer of the Year" in the Resolution magazine Creative Awards
- 2016 - nominated for "UK Producer of the Year" at the Music Producers Guild (MPG) Awards
- 2016 - nominated for "British Producer of the Year" at the BRIT awards
- 2018 - nominated for "UK Producer of the Year" at the Music Producers Guild (MPG) Awards
- 2019 - nominated for Best Rock Album (Ghost's "Prequelle") at the 61st Annual Grammy Awards
- 2019 - nominated for Best Rock Song (Ghost's "Rats") at the 61st Annual Grammy Awards

== Credits ==
Dalgety has worked with artists including:

- The Cult
- Pixies
- Rammstein
- Ghost
- Royal Blood
- Opeth
- Killing Joke
- Turbowolf
- Dinosaur Pile-Up
- Band of Skulls
- Siouxsie
- Simple Minds
- Clutch
- Tribulation (band)
- Europe (band)

- The Maccabees
- Therapy?
- Cat's Eyes
- Smoke Fairies
- The Family Rain
- Grave Pleasures
- Broken Hands
- The Amazons
- Blood Red Shoes
- Inheaven
- Demob Happy
- The Damned
- Creeper
- Carpenter Brut
