= Square Hammer =

- Cover art for the CD single

Single by Ghost

from the EP Popestar
- B-side: "He Is"
- Released: 12 September 2016
- Genre: Heavy metal
- Length: 3:59
- Label: Loma Vista; Spinefarm
- Songwriter: Tobias Forge
- Producer: Tom Dalgety

Ghost singles chronology
"Majesty" (2015)	"Square Hammer" (2016)	"Rats" (2018)

Music video
- "Square Hammer" on YouTube

"Square Hammer" is a song by the Swedish rock band Ghost. It was released as the lead single from the group's second EP Popestar. The song peaked at No. 1 on the Billboard Mainstream Rock chart in January 2017, making the band the first Swedish band to top the chart. "Square Hammer" was one of the official theme songs for NXT TakeOver: San Antonio.

== Track listing ==
=== CD single ===
No.	Title	Length
1.	"Square Hammer"	3:59

=== 7" single ===
Side A
No.	Title	Length
1.	"Square Hammer"	3:59

Side B
No.	Title	Length
1.	"He Is" (radio edit)	3:31

== Music video ==
The music video was directed by Zev Deans and stars Brendan McGowan as Cardinal Copia, Papa Emeritus III, and himself. It was filmed in Brooklyn, New York.

The camera travels through a green-lit city during a lightning storm. Papa Emeritus III takes a paper from a hawker. He reads about a Mysterious Spectre who has seized power. He also reads about his role in the first ever moving picture. The picture "Square Hammer" is set to premiere at the Meliora Grand that very night. He exits the limo and waves to his fans. He and his Nameless Ghouls enter the theatre. They greet fans and take their seats in the front row.

The silent film starts with a man holding a torch amidst a dark and stormy landscape, also during a lightning storm. He finds a tunnel. A portcullis raises, revealing Papa Emeritus III as a mysterious spectre. He conducts the man inside, showing him a stone coffin, which starts to open, revealing more lightning within. Back in the theatre, Papa Emeritus III appears surprised about this part and the projector starts to spark. In the film, a squared hammer surrounded by electric arcs is revealed. The intertitle refers to it as the "Square Hammer". The man picks it up as the mysterious spectre makes mystic passes. The Hammer glows and emits lightning, and the mysterious spectre's left eye glows.

Suddenly, the mysterious spectre puts his hand through the screen. It arcs with power. Papa Emeritus III sees it, but the others appear unconcerned. Then the mysterious spectre bows and becomes a cloud of bats, which chase everyone except Papa Emeritus III and the ghouls outside the theatre. An afterimage of the mysterious spectre glows blue on the screen.

Outside, the bats ascend into the night sky and congeal into a giant spectre, silhouetted against the full moon. Inside the theatre, the projector sparks even more violently and shows an image of a red cardinal on top of a cross before the film melts. Papa Emeritus III has had enough and leaves. Outside, the blue image of the spectre glows against the sky. A spotlight passes over it and its left eye glows. Papa Emeritus III's left eye begins to glow before the cut.

=== Production ===
- Director – Zev Deans
- VFE Director – Madeline Quinn
- Starring Brendan McGowan

== Reception ==
MetalSucks gave the video a positive review. Metal Injection gave the song a positive review.

Loudwire named "Square Hammer" the best metal song of 2016 and awarded the video as Best Metal Video in their 6th Annual Loudwire Music Awards in 2017, leading the vote with 39.27% over videos such as Avenged Sevenfold's "The Stage" and Slayer's "You Against You". Also in December 2019, Loudwire named it the Metal Song of the Decade.

== Chart performance ==
=== Weekly charts ===
Weekly chart performance for "Square Hammer"
Chart (2017)	Peak position
US Hot Rock & Alternative Songs (Billboard)	23
US Rock & Alternative Airplay (Billboard)	13

=== Year-end charts ===
Year-end chart performance for "Square Hammer"
Chart (2017)	Position
US Hot Rock Songs (Billboard)	94

== Certifications ==
Certifications for "Square Hammer"
Region	Certification	Certified units/sales
Canada (Music Canada)	Gold	40,000^{‡}
Norway (IFPI Norway)	Gold	30,000^{‡}
United Kingdom (BPI)	Silver	200,000^{‡}
United States (RIAA)	Platinum	1,000,000^{‡}
^{‡} Sales+streaming figures based on certification alone.

== See also ==
- 2016 in Swedish music
- Ghost discography
- List of Billboard Mainstream Rock number-one songs of the 2010s
