= He Is (Ghost song) =

- Artwork used for the 2017 live version

Promotional single by Ghost

from the album Meliora
- Released: May 31, 2015
- Recorded: January 2015
- Length: 4:13
- Label: Loma Vista
- Songwriters: Tobias Forge; Klas Åhlund; Martin Persner
- Producer: Klas Åhlund

"He Is" is a song by the Swedish rock band Ghost. The fifth track from the group's third studio album Meliora, it was released as a promotional single on May 31, 2015. The song reached number 64 on the Swedish national music chart, their second-highest to date. A live recording was later released in 2017.

== Background and release ==
The song "He Is" was written in 2007. In an interview at Swedish radio show "Värvet", Tobias Forge commented on the origin of the song:

Those lyrics [for "He Is"] were actually in Italian. ... My girlfriend at the time, who is my wife now, ... had studied in Italy. She liked a lot of [Italian] smarmy songs. She would sometimes translate the lyrics, which was great fun. ... [In these lyrics] there's a lot of instigation to escape boredom and lot of infidelity. So I wrote a song that was supposed to make fun of that. It was called "Lei è", which means "She Is". So that was a joke I made with Boel, a pastiche on smarmy Italian music. The song was bottled for a few years. Once the joke was over, I actually thought the song turned out good.

The band attempted to record it for 2013's Infestissumam, but after trying to get it to "sound like Ghost" and adding and subtracting aspects, ultimately put it on the shelf. One band member said that he just did not know what to make of it, explaining that "When you're a rock band, it's always a little hard to play softly", "you've got to take your pulse down to be able to approach a different kind of energy level". Upon starting pre-production for Meliora they added "He Is" to the list and, after praise from producer Klas Åhlund, recorded it as it was.

A Nameless Ghoul told Loudwire that there are various degrees of personal meaning within the song, one of which is the lyrics. He explained that the original demo lyrics were "bogus" and did not have any "bite", but following the 2014 suicide of Selim Lemouchi, guitarist of the Dutch rock band the Devil's Blood who was friends with members of Ghost, the lyrics materialized.

Ghost performed an acoustic version of "He Is" at the Bandit Rock Awards on January 19, 2016, at the Hard Rock Cafe in Stockholm.

A 10" picture disc vinyl single of a live recording of "He Is", that was limited to 500 copies, was released in 2017. Its content was also made available digitally on iTunes.

== Videos ==
A lyric video for the song was made by Mattias Erik Johansson/Claudio Marino/Nicklas Lindahl. It was uploaded to the band's official YouTube channel on November 9, 2015.

On August 24, 2017, Ghost uploaded the final music video from Meliora for "He Is". It was directed by Zev Deans and starred Brendan McGowan as Papa Emeritus. It premiered at Saint Vitus Bar in New York City the day before. In a quick second during the video, it showed Tony Alamo. An extended director's cut of the video was released exclusively in collaboration with Metal Injection.

== Reception ==
Upon Meliora's release, "He Is" was quickly cited as a stand out track and became a fan favorite at concerts. PopMatters's Nathan Stevens wrote that it "could be mistaken for a worship song in a mega-church and that's not a demerit against the track. The chorus is massive and begs for a sing along". Sputnikmusic wrote that the track "showcases Ghost's keen attention to integrating doom-infused, progressive elements with glistening, pop-oriented sensibilities". They praised the harmonized guitars as "marvelous" and the "ethereal" vocals.

In an interview with one of the guitarists, Joe Bosso of MusicRadar cited the guitar solo as the musician's best. The Nameless Ghoul then explained the solo is not a tapping one, but a "tapping-like technique" and that it is one of many parts of the song that is exactly as it was on the demo.

In Rolling Stone's readers' poll of The 10 Best Songs of 2015, "He Is" was ranked fourth. Brittany Spanos wrote that with the song Ghost "hit a psychedelic note, going back to metal's folkier roots from the Sixties and Seventies".

== Track listing ==
2015 promo single

No.	Title	Length
1.	"He Is" (radio edit)	3:31

2017 10" vinyl single

Side A
No.	Title	Length
1.	"He Is" (live in San Francisco)	4:17
2.	"He Is" (Ghost featuring Alison Mosshart)	3:51

Side B
No.	Title	Length
3.	"He Is" (Health remix)	3:41
4.	"He Is" (The Haxan Cloak remix)	6:37

== Personnel ==
- Papa Emeritus III − vocals
- Nameless Ghouls – all instrumentalists: lead guitarist, bassist, keyboardist, drummer, rhythm guitarist

== Certifications ==
Region	Certification	Certified units/sales
Norway (IFPI Norway)	Gold	30,000^{‡}
Sweden (GLF)	Platinum	40,000^{‡}
^{‡} Sales+streaming figures based on certification alone.
