= Meliora (album) =

Studio album by Ghost
- Released: August 21, 2015
- Recorded: January 2015
- Studios: EastWest Studios, Hollywood, California; Riksmixningsverket, Stockholm, Sweden; The Village Studios, Los Angeles, California; Ameraycan Studios, Hollywood, California
- Genres: Heavy metal; hard rock; progressive rock; psychedelic rock; pop rock
- Length: 41:32
- Label: Loma Vista
- Producer: Klas Åhlund

Ghost chronology
If You Have Ghost (2013)	Meliora (2015)	Popestar (2016)

Singles from Meliora
- 1. "Cirice" Released: May 30, 2015; 2. "From the Pinnacle to the Pit" Released: July 17, 2015; 3. "Majesty" Released: August 7, 2015

Meliora (Latin for "better things", and not "the pursuit of something better" as the band claims) is the third studio album by the Swedish rock band Ghost. The album was produced by Klas Åhlund and released on August 21, 2015. The album was generally well received, placing on several music publications' lists of the best heavy metal albums of the year and winning Best Hard Rock/Metal Album at the 2015 Grammis Awards. The lead single "Cirice" won the 2016 Grammy Award for Best Metal Performance. In September 2016, the band released a special edition of the album, called Meliora Redux.

== Background and recording ==
Ghost began crafting their third studio album, the follow-up to 2013's Infestissumam, at the end of 2014. The impetus for its "futuristic" theme came to a Nameless Ghoul a month or so prior to starting the Infestissumam tour. While trying out a new guitar rig during a rehearsal, the Ghoul created a "spacey echoed" effect that made a guitar riff sound "futuristic [and] sci-fi". At this point, he had the idea for their next album.

A Nameless Ghoul said that, because guitar took a backseat on Infestissumam, the band focused on guitar riffs from the beginning of the new album. He explained that part of this was achieved by having four different guitars, each played through three different amps, making four performances going through 12 amplifiers. They used two Gibson SGs, one from the early 1980s and the other from the 1960s; a 1962 Gibson Les Paul; and a Fender Telecaster.

Discussing the selection of Klas Åhlund as producer, the Ghoul said that despite his reputation for working with pop singers and having never produced a heavy metal band before, Åhlund had many of the same musical interests as Ghost. A band member also said, "I definitely think that we got a lot of ideas and a lot of new angles that we wouldn't have had, had we worked with a more established rock producer".

A member of the band said that the pre-production, writing and arranging of Meliora took a long time, not allowing for the luxury of recording any non-album songs with the exception of "Zenith", which was left off the main album but added as an extra track to a limited edition.

Tobias Forge later explained that he and Åhlund had spent three months on pre-production before going to Los Angeles where they recorded the drums with a session drummer. Upon returning to Stockholm they had a "very, very lavish, stupid sort of procedure" in a large studio with multiple people coming in and going or just hanging around, of which he said "On one hand, you think it's good for morale to do that, but no, it wasn't, evidently, in the end."

== Themes and composition ==
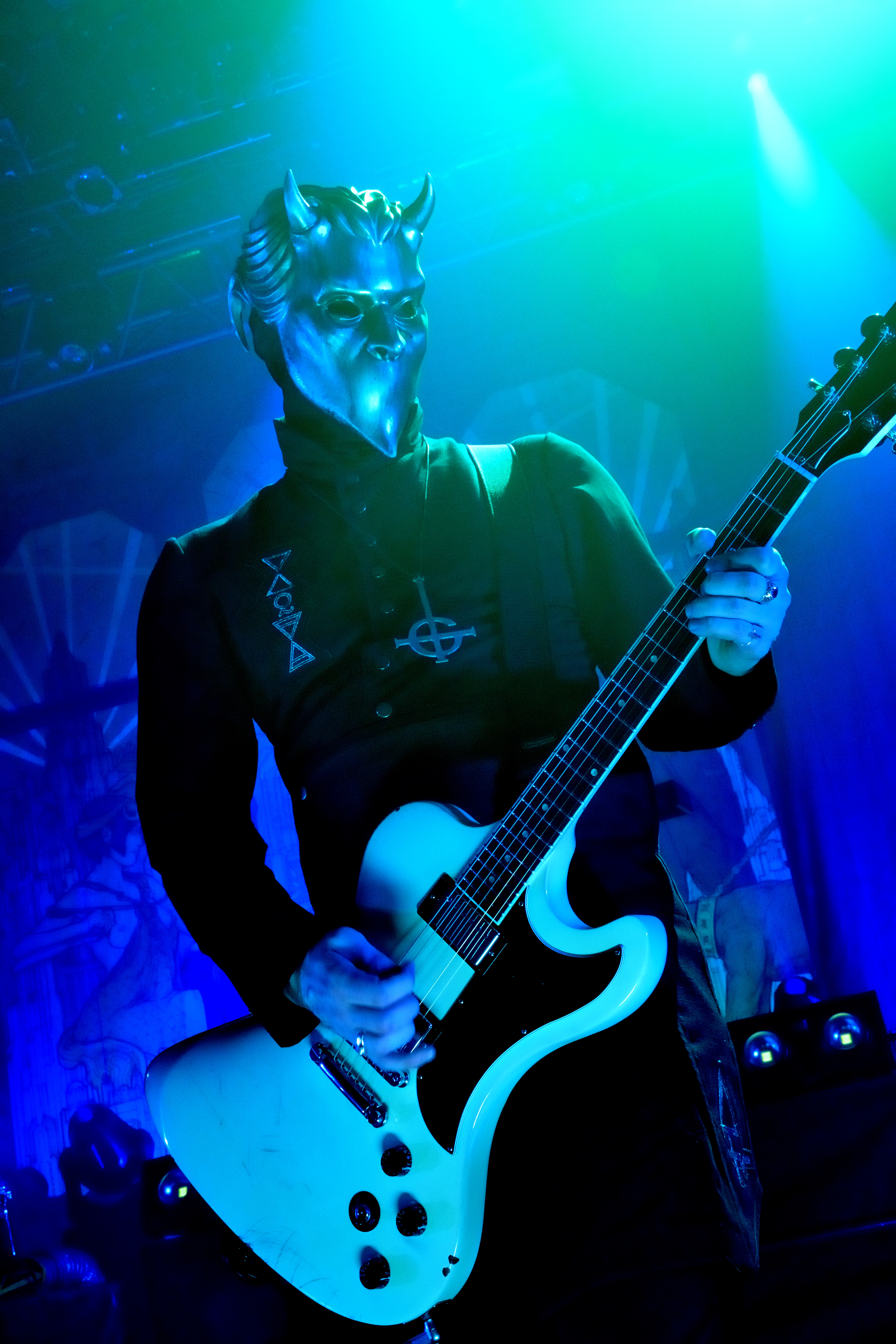
Feeling that the guitar had taken a back seat on their previous album, the band focused on the instrument for Meliora.

Meliora has been described as heavy metal, hard rock, progressive rock, psychedelic rock, and pop rock, with elements of psychedelia, shock rock, pop, and glam metal. Following their debut album Opus Eponymous, which is about the coming of the Antichrist, and Infestissumam, which is about the presence of the Antichrist, Meliora's main theme is "the absence of God". A Nameless Ghoul said, "The lyrics deal with the void that happens when there is no god, when there is no one there to help you. But even then, there will always be some fucker there to give you guidance. And the band is basically portrayed as the religious party that comes in there with a guiding hand. We offer the one place in the world that is spiritual." A member of the band also said that it was "more about the modern man and woman in their pursuit of purpose in life. It's hard to live in a society if you're not willing to buy that you are in a collective, yet usually in the Western world, there is a big disregard for individual responsibility." The album's title, Meliora (Latin for "better things"), matches the theme of the lyrical content and "the backdrop that we wanted to paint in front of which we're playing these songs, basically, which was supposed to be, or is supposed to be, a super-urban, metropolitan, pre-apocalyptic, dystopic futuristic thing."

Although Ghost used choirs on their previous album, they had a lot of issues doing so. This time, the band decided to go the extra mile and spend the necessary money. A Nameless Ghoul said, "There are a lot of mellotron choirs on there because we wanted it to feel [a] little bit synthetic and simulated. The choir symbolizes the gothic element that comes in all of a sudden."

The opening track "Spirit" uses the "futuristic [and] sci-fi" guitar riff that gave a Nameless Ghoul the idea for the Meliora album. The song also utilizes organs, a theremin, and a glockenspiel. A Nameless Ghoul called "From the Pinnacle to the Pit" a "truly stomping riff-based song, Led Zeppelin-style" and "something that would sound great coming out of a car stereo in an American high school parking lot". "Cirice" was originally conceived together with "Devil Church", which was its opening, as a very dark and doomy nine-minute instrumental without a chorus. After working on it further at the urging of Åhlund, a chorus materialized and the two parts were split.

The song "He Is" was written in 2007. The band tried recording it for Infestissumam, but after attempting to make it "sound like Ghost" and adding and subtracting aspects, they eventually put it to one side. Upon starting pre-production for Meliora, they added "He Is" to the list, and after praise from Åhlund, recorded it as it was. A Nameless Ghoul told Loudwire that the lyrics to the song were influenced by the suicide of Selim Lemouchi, guitarist of The Devil's Blood, who was friends with members of Ghost. Discussing "Majesty", a Ghoul said, "Lyrically, it's on one hand a hymn about the dark lord of the underworld. On the other hand it paints a picture of a swarm of people, whom in a world of complete disaster, idolizes an authority that is clearly looking down upon them. How to love something that hates you back."

== Promotion ==
On May 29, 2015, Meliora's artwork and track listing were revealed to the public. The song "Cirice" was released as a free download from the band's official site on May 31. A music video for the song, directed by Roboshobo, premiered on June 8. The song "Absolution" was released for streaming on July 31. A music video for "From the Pinnacle to the Pit", directed by Zev Deans, was released on September 14. During the Black to the Future tour, the band recruited local female fans to dress up as nuns and play "Sisters of Sin" while serving alcoholic beverages during each show. During a concert on October 6 in St. Louis, Lzzy Hale of Halestorm served as a Sister of Sin. Ghost performed "Cirice" on The Late Show with Stephen Colbert on October 30, during a Halloween-themed episode, marking the band's first television appearance in the United States. A lyric video for "He Is" was uploaded on November 9, 2015. In September 2016, Ghost released a special edition of the album, called Meliora Redux, which included "Zenith".

== Reception ==
Professional ratings
Aggregate scores
Source	Rating
AnyDecentMusic?	7.6/10
Metacritic	78/100
Review scores
Source	Rating
AllMusic	5/5 stars
Classic Rock	4/5 stars
Distorted Sound Mag	9/10
Exclaim!	8/10
GIG Soup	100%
The Guardian	4/5 stars
Metal Hammer	4/5 stars
Pitchfork	6.2/10
PopMatters	8/10 stars
Stereoboard	4/5 stars

Meliora received generally positive reviews from music critics. At Metacritic, which assigns a normalized rating out of 100 to reviews from mainstream critics, the album received an average score of 78, which indicates "generally favorable reviews", based on 12 reviews. Thom Jurek of AllMusic wrote, "Meliora...looks back at what made their...debut, Opus Eponymous, so special: Beautifully written, hook-laden, hard rock songs with clean (and even serene) singing." Thomas Woroniak of AntiHero Magazine said, "Ghost come out on top offering a compelling addition to the overarching message of self-determined freedom with a well-crafted album that rocks harder than ever". He also added that the album "delivers more of a modern edge with sharper teeth when compared to its predecessor, while maintaining continuity with the overall evolution of the band's characteristic sound". Paul Brannigan of Classic Rock called it "[Ghost’s] finest outing to date...[and] a meticulously executed, artful collection of black-souled retro doom-pop, as heavy as Metallica, as melodically sophisticated as ABBA." James Weaver of Distorted Sound Mag wrote, "the band...continues...to blend their potent mixture of psychedelic occult rock with that early metal sound and produce results that blow you away." Natalie Zina Walschots of Exclaim! wrote, "[the album] exists at the intersection of an Aleister Crowley ritual, a Mercyful Fate riff and a haunted organ playing itself at midnight...[with] vocals of Papa Emeritus' third incarnation [fitting] perfectly in with the smooth, smoky '70s aesthetic they have cultivated." Alex Mannings of GIG Soup complimented the album's production writing, "every instrument is clearly, cleanly audible, never too loud or too quiet, and it’s so glorious to hear a good bass sound...The Nameless Drummer Ghoul...[serves] as the integral backbone...[and] the keys...[add to] Ghost’s eerie atmosphere."

Dom Lawson of The Guardian wrote, "Meliora strikes a shrewd balance between its two predecessors, [with] snappier song structures." Holly Wright of Metal Hammer described Meliora as "a diverse and thrilling concoction of melodically spun nightmares dripping in riffs and solos and given a dulcet sheen with those recognisable Ghost harmonies." Montreal Rampage described the album's sound as "a peculiar hybrid of Sabbath-like metal, and progressive rock". Andy O'Connor of Pitchfork complimented the album's mixing and upfront guitar sound, stating "[the song] "From the Pinnacle to the Pit" has that drive sorely missing from Infestissumam". However, they citizeded the vocals wriitng, "[the album] reveals the limitations of Ghost's vocalist...there are plenty of moments where you wish Papa wouldn't just coast on a croon, but would instead let out a maniacal laugh or scream." Nathan Stevens of PopMatters wrote, "after two okay-to-solid records, Ghost have finally perfected their tightrope act." Alec Chillingworth of Stereoboard called it the band's "most cohesive, inspiring and god damn catchy album."

=== Accolades ===
Meliora won Best Hard Rock/Metal Album at the 2015 Grammis Awards, marking Ghost's second win in the category. It was named one of the best metal albums of 2015 by several publications, including Rolling Stone, and LA Weekly. Metal Hammer named it No. 13 on their list of 2015's best albums in any genre. Readers voted it the Best Metal Album of the year at the fifth annual Loudwire Music Awards, while Loudwire themselves listed it second. Revolver also named it the second best album of the year in hard rock and heavy metal. The song "Cirice" won the 2016 Grammy Award for Best Metal Performance. Loudwire ranked the same song as the second Best Metal Song of 2015.

Meliora was certified platinum by the IFPI in November 2016, for sales of 40,000. The album debuted at No. 8 on the Billboard 200 chart, with an estimated 29,000 copies sold in its first week.

== Track listing ==
All writing credited to "A Ghoul Writer" in the booklet. Actual writing credits adapted from ASCAP.^{1}

No.	Title	Writer(s)	Length
1.	"Spirit"	Tobias Forge; Martin Persner	5:15
2.	"From the Pinnacle to the Pit"	Forge; Klas Åhlund; Persner	4:02
3.	"Cirice"	Forge; Åhlund	6:02
4.	"Spöksonat"	Forge; Åhlund	0:56
5.	"He Is"	Forge; Åhlund; Persner	4:13
6.	"Mummy Dust"	Forge; Åhlund; Persner; Gustaf Lindström	4:07
7.	"Majesty"	Forge; Persner	5:24
8.	"Devil Church"	Forge	1:06
9.	"Absolution"	Forge; Åhlund; Persner	4:50
10.	"Deus in Absentia"	Forge; Åhlund; Johan Ingvar Lindström	5:37
Total length:			41:32

Best Buy edition bonus tracks
No.	Title	Writer(s)	Length
11.	"Year Zero" (live)	Forge; Persner	5:00
12.	"If You Have Ghosts" (live; Roky Erickson cover)	Roky Erickson	4:13
Total length:			50:45

Deluxe edition disc two: Popestar
No.	Title	Writer(s)	Length
1.	"Square Hammer"	Forge	3:59
2.	"Nocturnal Me" (Echo & the Bunnymen cover)	Pete de Freitas; Les Pattinson; Will Sergeant; Ian McCulloch	5:13
3.	"I Believe" (Simian Mobile Disco cover)	Jas Shaw; Simon Lord; James Ford	4:06
4.	"Missionary Man" (Eurythmics cover)	Annie Lennox; David Stewart	3:42
5.	"Bible" (Imperiet cover)	Christian Falk; Fred Asp; Joakim Thåström; Per Hägglund	6:34
Total length:			23:34

Meliora Redux
No.	Title	Length
11.	"Zenith"	6:05
12.	"Square Hammer"	3:59
13.	"Nocturnal Me" (Echo & the Bunnymen cover)	5:13
14.	"I Believe" (Simian Mobile Disco cover)	4:06
15.	"Missionary Man" (Eurythmics cover)	3:42
16.	"Bible" (Imperiet cover)	6:34
Total length:		71:11

Limited LP
No.	Title	Writer(s)	Length
1.	"Zenith"	Forge; Åhlund; Persner	6:05
2.	"Cirice (Radio Edit)"	Forge; Åhlund	4:46
Total length:			10:51

^{1}Band members also used aliases for their actual writing credits: Forge is credited as "A Ghoul Writer", and Persner as "Indio Marcato".

== Personnel ==
=== Ghost ===
- Papa Emeritus III – vocals
- Nameless Ghouls:
  - – lead guitar
  - – bass
  - – rhythm guitar
  - – keyboards
  - – drums

=== Additional personnel ===
- Ludvig Kennberg – drums

=== Technical personnel ===
- Klas Åhlund – production
- Andy Wallace – mixing
- Brian Lucey – mastering
- Zbigniew M. Bielak – artwork
- David M. Brinley – "Zenith" artwork for limited edition

== Charts ==
=== Weekly charts ===
2015 weekly chart performance for Meliora
Chart (2015)	Peak position
Australian Albums (ARIA)	20
Austrian Albums (Ö3 Austria)	41
Belgian Albums (Ultratop Flanders)	21
Belgian Albums (Ultratop Wallonia)	23
Canadian Albums (Billboard)	9
Dutch Albums (Album Top 100)	6
Finnish Albums (Suomen virallinen lista)	1
French Albums (SNEP)	28
German Albums (Offizielle Top 100)	19
Irish Albums (IRMA)	65
Norwegian Albums (VG-lista)	2
Scottish Albums (OCC)	17
Swedish Albums (Sverigetopplistan)	1
Swiss Albums (Schweizer Hitparade)	14
UK Albums (Official Charts)	23
UK Rock & Metal Albums (OCC)	2
US Billboard 200	8
US Top Hard Rock Albums (Billboard)	2
US Top Rock Albums (Billboard)	2

2025 weekly chart performance for Meliora
Chart (2025)	Peak position
German Rock & Metal Albums (Offizielle Top 100)	8
Polish Albums (ZPAV)	76

=== Year-end charts ===
Year-end chart performance for Meliora
Chart (2015)	Position
Swedish Albums (Sverigetopplistan)	11

Chart (2016)	Position
Swedish Albums (Sverigetopplistan)	39

== Certifications ==
Certifications for Meliora
Region	Certification	Certified units/sales
Canada (Music Canada)	Gold	40,000^{‡}
Sweden (GLF)	Platinum	40,000^{‡}
United Kingdom (BPI)	Silver	60,000^{‡}
^{‡} Sales+streaming figures based on certification alone.
