= Tobias Forge =

Swedish musician (born 1981)

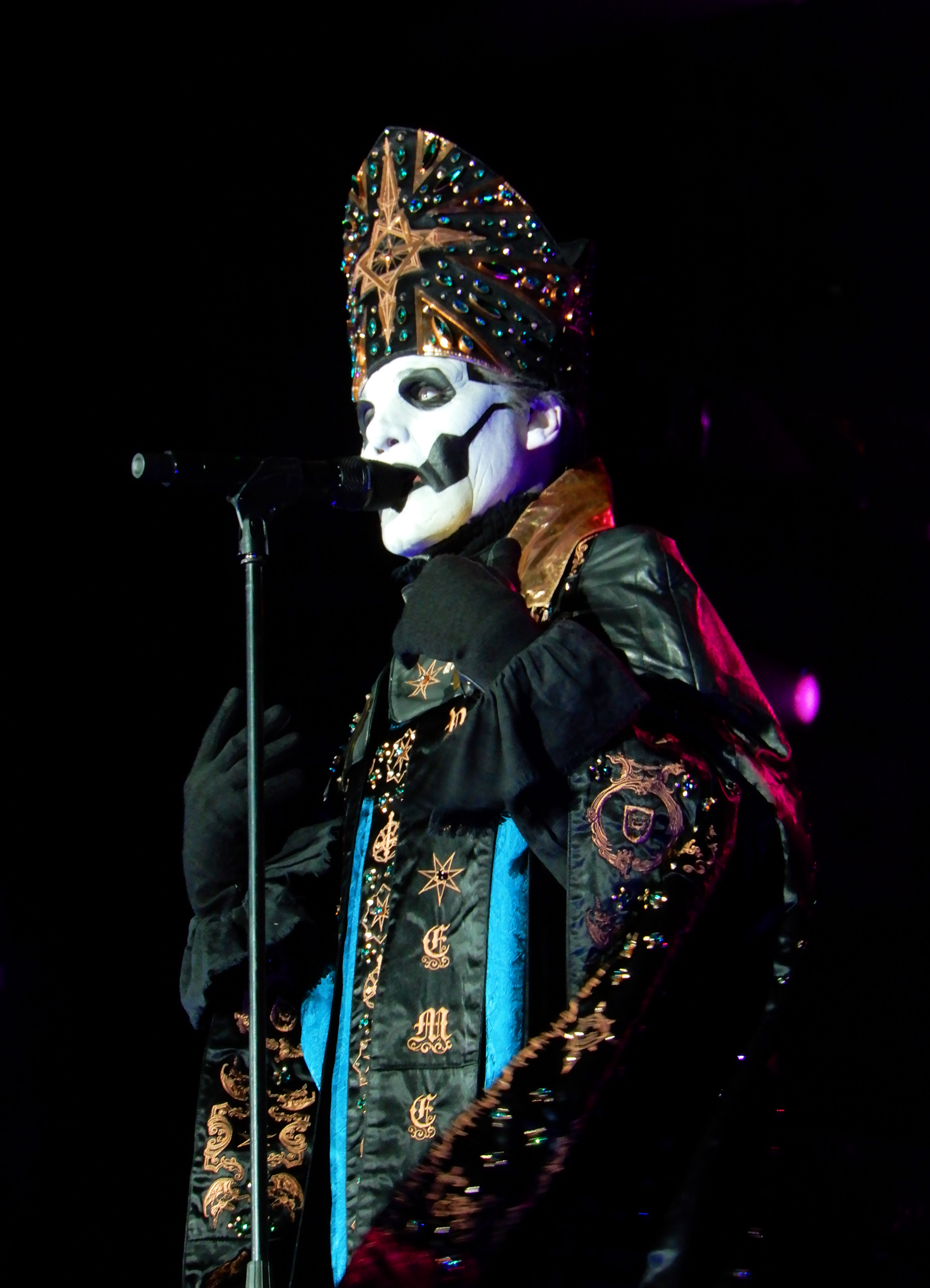
- Forge performing with Ghost in his Papa Emeritus IV persona at Hellfest 2022

Background information
- Also known as: Leviathan; Kopromancer; Gene Walker; Mary Goore; A Ghoul Writer; Special Ghoul; Papa Emeritus (I, II, III, IV, V Perpetua, Nihil); Cardinal Copia
- Born: Tobias Jens Forge; 3 March 1981 (age 45); Linköping, Sweden
- Genres: Hard rock; heavy metal; arena rock; pop rock; progressive rock; psychedelic rock; death metal
- Occupations: Singer; musician; songwriter
- Instruments: Vocals; guitar
- Years active: 1996–present
- Member of: Ghost
- Formerly of: Crashdïet; Repugnant; Magna Carta Cartel
- Website: ghost-official.com

Tobias Jens Forge (Swedish pronunciation: [tʊˈbǐːas ˈjɛns ˈfɔ̌rːɡɛ]; born 3 March 1981) is a Swedish musician. He is the frontman, leader, primary songwriter, and sole continuous member of the masked rock band Ghost, performing live as their vocalist under the stage name Papa Perpetua/Papa Emeritus V (Previously as Papa Emeritus ["Papas" I through IV], Cardinal Copia). Although the band was formed in 2006, Forge's identity as the Ghost frontman was only confirmed in 2017, following a lawsuit by former band members due to a royalty dispute. Prior to finding success, he was in several other bands, including Repugnant and Crashdïet, under the stage name Mary Goore.

Due to "Ghost's epic progression from underground doom favorites to an arena phenomenon" in the 2010s, Loudwire named Forge the Metal Artist of the Decade. In 2025, Ghost was awarded "The Visionary Artist Award" in Rock Sound Awards, citing the performance as "one of the most interesting and carefully crafted performance artists of our time."

== Music career ==
=== Superior and Repugnant and Crashdïet ===
Forge was a member of the band Superior under the stage name Leviathan in 1996. There were two Superior demos called "Metamorphis" (1996) and "Illustrare ad Infernali" (1997). He fronted the Stockholm-based death metal band Repugnant from 1998, under the stage name Mary Goore, which Metal Hammer reported is a play on the name of Northern Irish guitarist Gary Moore. They recorded their only studio album Epitome of Darkness in 2002, but it was left unreleased when the band broke up in 2004, only being published in 2006. Between 2000 and 2002, Forge was also a guitarist for glam metal band Crashdïet using the Mary Goore name. At some point he also played guitar for the punk rock band Onkel Kånkel. Repugnant briefly reunited for the Hell's Pleasure festival in 2010.

=== Subvision and Magna Carta Cartel ===
From 2002 to 2008, Forge was vocalist and guitarist of the pop rock band Subvision. The group also included future Ghost members Martin Persner and Gustaf Lindström on guitar and bass respectively. They released two EPs and one album, So Far So Noir (2006), before disbanding.

Forge, Persner and Simon Söderberg, another future Ghost member, were also members of the Linköping-based alternative rock band Magna Carta Cartel (or MCC) from 2006 to 2010. Forge played guitar and bass, with Persner and Söderberg both handling guitar and singing duties. The band went on hiatus when all three began to focus on Ghost. Persner left Ghost in July 2016 and reformed Magna Carta Cartel.

=== Ghost ===
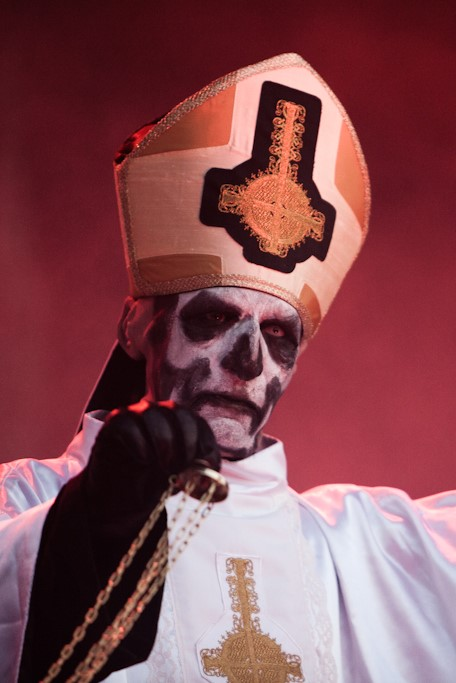
Forge in character as Papa Emeritus I in 2012

Since 2006, Forge has acted as chief songwriter and business leader of the rock and heavy metal band Ghost, a project and role that contributed to a significant rise in his fame and popularity, following many years of involvement in other underground acts. During live performances with the band, he performs as its singer. Each album has a 'new singer': originally Papa Emeritus I through to III—a demonic anti-pope—and then Cardinal Copia, who became Papa Emeritus IV in March 2020. Peter Hällje, a former bandmate of Martin Persner, claimed he designed the Papa Emeritus character in 2005, prior to the formation of Ghost. Hällje never performed as Papa Emeritus and agreed with Persner to let him use the character for his then-new band. For recorded material, Forge seems to also play most of the other instruments in addition to vocals. For example, he claimed that the 2010 debut album, Opus Eponymous, was recorded with a session drummer and nothing else.

In 2012, during a concert in the band's hometown of Linköping, Sweden, Papa Emeritus was seemingly retired and replaced by a new vocalist, Papa Emeritus II, but this was actually Forge in another costume. The band's second album, Infestissumam, was released in 2013. Due to a legal dispute over the band's name, they were forced to release the album using the name "Ghost B.C." in the United States. Forge performed as Papa Emeritus II for this album, as well as the subsequent EP, If You Have Ghost (2013). Papa Emeritus III was introduced in 2015 to coincide with the release of the band's third album, Meliora. Papa Emeritus III was retired at the end of Ghost's 2016–2017 Popestar Tour (being physically dragged off stage at the end of the final show), and a new character, Papa Emeritus Zero (now known as Papa Nihil), was introduced immediately afterward. Forge is credited as Papa Nihil on the two-track release Seven Inches of Satanic Panic, which is purported by the band to have been recorded in 1969. For Ghost's fourth album, Prequelle (2018), Forge adopted another new persona, Cardinal Copia. During the final show of A Pale Tour Named Death, Cardinal Copia was anointed and introduced as Papa Emeritus IV. Papa V Perpetua was revealed as the new frontman for Ghost on 5 February 2025; making his first appearance in the music video of the band's single "Satanized".

Despite anonymity being one of Ghost's biggest themes, Forge's identity as Papa Emeritus was revealed following a lawsuit in April 2017 by former Ghost members over a royalties dispute. They also claimed he was trying to transform Ghost "from a band into a solo project with hired musicians" in an "underhanded and shameless way". Forge has disputed this, claiming that Ghost "was always sort of… I guess a Bathory sort of band, where there was people playing live, and the people playing live [were] not necessarily the same that played on the records." Forge claimed that "no legal partnership" ever existed between the other members and himself; they were paid a fixed salary to perform and execute the band's image as he instructed as "musicians for hire."

== Musical style ==
Forge's music has been described as hard rock, heavy metal, arena rock, pop rock, progressive rock, psychedelic rock, doom metal, and death metal. The latter of which describes Repugnant, a previous band he was in.

== Other work ==
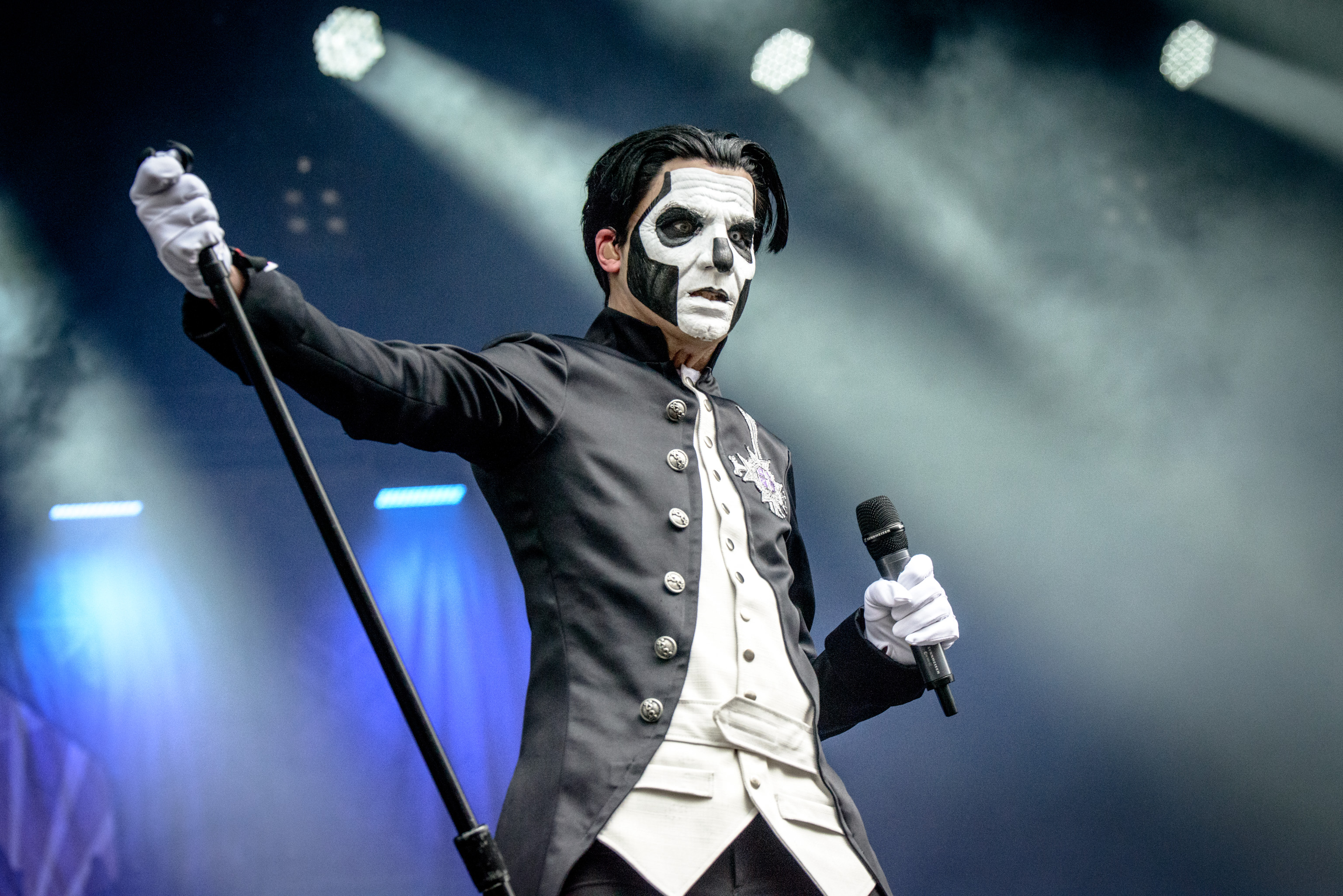
Forge performing as Papa Emeritus III in 2016

Forge, as Papa Emeritus III, appears as a guest on Candlemass's May 2018 vinyl-exclusive version of "House of Doom". As Cardinal Copia, he joined members of Candlemass and Vargas and Lagola for a live performance of "Enter Sandman" in front of King Carl XVI Gustaf of Sweden and Queen Silvia of Sweden during a ceremony on 14 June 2018 honoring Metallica with the Polar Music Prize. Cardinal Copia also makes a featured appearance on the song "I'm Not Afraid" from Emigrate's November 2018 album A Million Degrees. On 22 January 2021, Papa Emeritus IV joined the Hellacopters on the Swedish television game show På spåret to perform a cover of "Sympathy for the Devil". Papa Emeritus IV also appeared at Guaranteed Rate Field on 22 September 2022 to throw out the ceremonial first pitch of the Chicago White Sox and Cleveland Guardians baseball game. Forge also appeared in the last episode of Netflix series Clark, that aired in May 2022.

Directed by Forge and Alex Ross Perry, on 20 June 2024, Rite Here Rite Now was released in cinemas globally by Trafalgar Releasing. The film includes a narrative story based on a web series produced by the band, which incorporates fictional characters and lore surrounding them. In 2026, he directed the music video Premature Burial for a song by his former band Repugnant for the film V/H/S/Mixtape.

== Personal life ==
Forge grew up in a predominantly Christian environment, where he was exposed to Christian teachings, films, and stories about Jesus from a young age. Forge does not identify as an atheist or anti-religious.

His brother Sebastian, who was thirteen years his senior, had a large influence on him and introduced him to film and music such as Siouxsie and the Banshees, Kim Wilde, Rainbow, Kiss, and Mötley Crüe at a very young age. Sebastian died from heart disease on 12 March 2010, the same day that Ghost released their first demo songs online.

Forge is married and the father of fraternal twins, a son named Morris and a daughter named Minou, born in 2008. Minou sings in "Ashes", the opening track to Prequelle. Morris is featured on Ghost's cover of the Metallica song "Enter Sandman", which Forge recorded to support Camp Aranu'tiq, a summer camp for transgender youths.

Forge is a member of the Swedish Order of Freemasons.

== Discography ==
=== Repugnant ===
Studio albums:

- Epitome of Darkness (2006)

EPs:

- Hecatomb (1999)
- Premature Burial (2004)

=== Subvision ===
Studio albums:

- So Far So Noir (2006)

EPs:

- Brilliant Music for Stupid People (2003)
- Pearls for Pigsnawps (2003)
- The Killing Floor E.P. (2004)

=== Magna Carta Cartel ===
Studio albums:

- Goodmorning Restrained (2009)

EPs:

- Valiant Visions Dawn (2008)
