= Ghost discography =

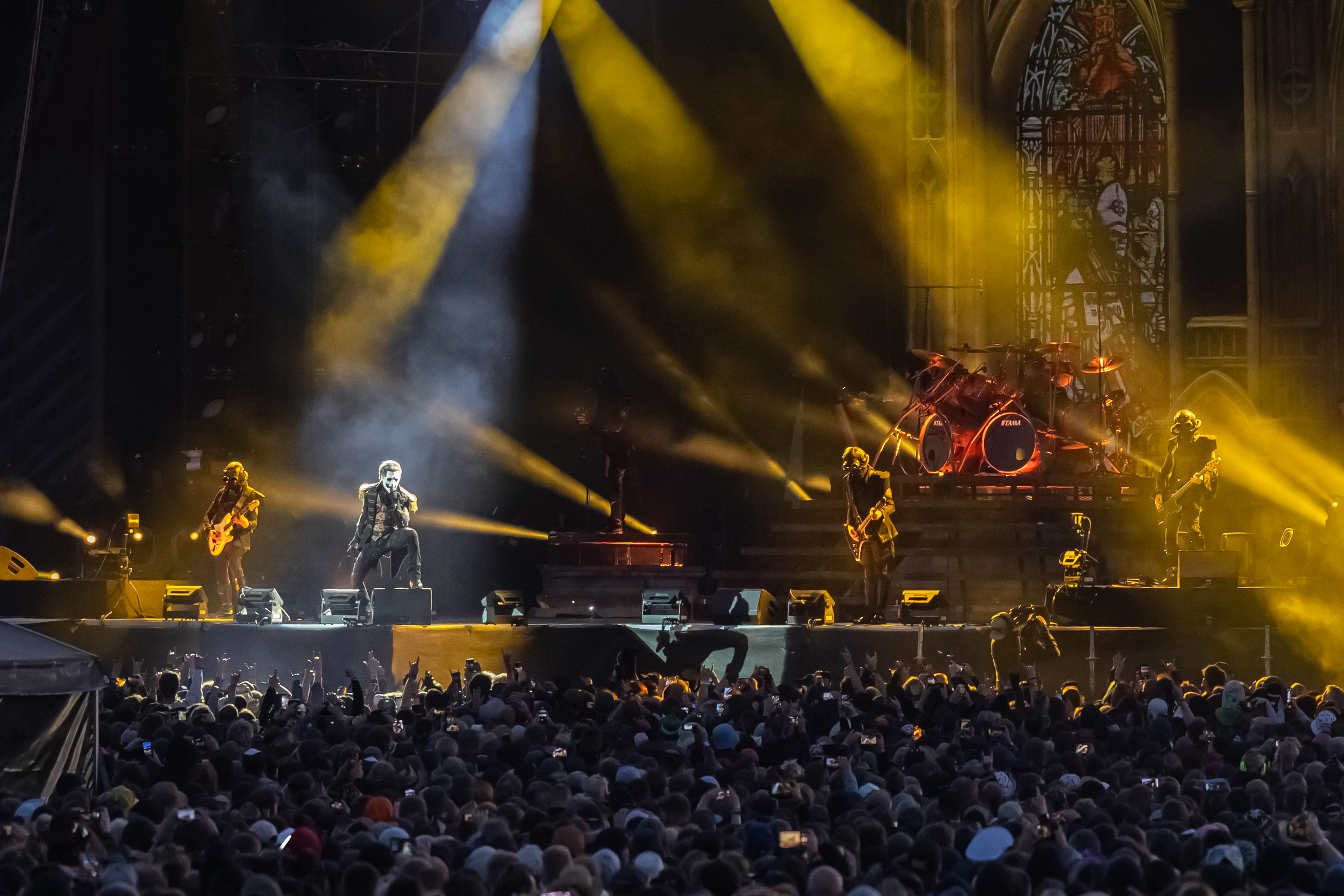
- Ghost performing in 2023
- Studio albums: 6
- EPs: 3
- Live albums: 2
- Compilation albums: 2
- Singles: 26
- Music videos: 21

The Swedish rock band Ghost has released six studio albums, two live albums, three extended plays (EPs), two compilation albums, twenty-six singles and twenty-one music videos. Formed in Linköping in 2006, Ghost (formerly known as Ghost B.C. in the US) is composed of nine anonymous members – vocalist Papa Emeritus (revealed in 2017 to be Tobias Forge; all of the band's other frontmen are Forge under a different persona) and eight instrumentalists known as "Nameless Ghouls" (each representing one of the classical elements Fire, Water, Wind, Earth and Ether). After a self-issued demo, the band released its full-length debut Opus Eponymous on Rise Above Records in October 2010, which reached number 30 on the Swedish Albums Chart. "Elizabeth" was released as the sole single from the album in June.

In January 2013 the band returned with new frontman Papa Emeritus II, and in April the band released its second album Infestissumam. The album topped the Swedish Albums Chart, as well as reaching the top ten in Finland and Norway. In October 2014, the album was certified gold by the International Federation of the Phonographic Industry (IFPI) in Sweden, certifying sales of over 20,000 copies in the band's home country. Infestissumam lead single "Secular Haze" reached number 22 on the Finnish Singles Chart. The band released If You Have Ghost, a five-track EP of cover versions, in November 2013, which reached number 87 on the US Billboard 200.

Papa Emeritus III replaced II in May 2015, when the band released the single "Cirice" followed by "From the Pinnacle to the Pit" in July, both of which reached the top five of the US Billboard Mainstream Rock Songs chart. Ghost's third album Meliora was released in August, topping the albums charts in Sweden and Finland, and receiving a platinum certification in Sweden. A second EP, Popestar, featuring new original song "Square Hammer" and four covers, was released in September 2016. It became the first EP to top the Billboard Top Rock Albums chart since the chart began in 2006, while "Square Hammer" reached number 1 on the US Mainstream Rock chart, making the band the first Swedish band to top the chart.

Ghost released their fourth album Prequelle on 1 June 2018, which is the first to feature new frontman Cardinal Copia, and was preceded by the singles "Rats" and "Dance Macabre" in April.

On 13 September 2019, Ghost released Seven Inches of Satanic Panic, which has been described as a two-track EP and as a single. The day before, on 12 September, they released a video for the recording's A-side, "Kiss the Go-Goat", as part of their ongoing webseries.

== Albums ==
=== Studio albums ===
List of studio albums, with selected chart positions, sales figures and certifications
Title	Album details	Peak chart positions										Sales	Certifications
Title	Album details	SWE	AUS	BEL Fla.	CAN	FIN	GER	NED	NOR	UK	US	Sales	Certifications
Opus Eponymous	Released: 18 October 2010; Label: Rise Above; Formats: CD, LP, DL	30	—	—	—	—	90	—	—	—	—		
Infestissumam	Released: 10 April 2013; Labels: Loma Vista, Universal; Formats: CD, LP, DL	1	62	189	—	5	85	—	8	58	28		GLF: Gold
Meliora	Released: 21 August 2015; Labels: Loma Vista, Universal; Formats: CD, LP, DL	1	20	21	9	1	19	6	2	23	8		GLF: Platinum; BPI: Silver; MC: Gold
Prequelle	Released: 1 June 2018; Label: Loma Vista; Formats: CD, LP, DL, 8T, CT	1	7	4	6	1	2	14	1	10	3	US: 66,000	GLF: Platinum; BPI: Silver; IFPI NOR: Gold
Impera	Released: 11 March 2022; Label: Loma Vista; Formats: CD, LP, DL, CT	1	3	2	3	1	1	2	2	2	2	UK: 69,684; US: 132,000	GLF: Platinum; BPI: Silver
Skeletá	Released: 25 April 2025; Label: Loma Vista; Formats: CD, LP, DL, CT	1	1	1	2	1	1	2	2	2	1	UK: 30,515	
"—" denotes a release that did not chart or was not issued in that region.

=== Live albums ===
List of live albums, with selected chart positions
Title	Album details	Peak chart positions									
Title	Album details	SWE	BEL Fla.	BEL Wal.	ESP	FIN	FRA	GER	NED	NOR	SWI
Ceremony and Devotion	Released: 8 December 2017; Labels: Loma Vista, Concord; Formats: CD, LP, 8T, DL	2	71	49	82	13	49	53	124	18	61
Rite Here Rite Now	Released: 26 July 2024; Labels: Loma Vista; Formats: CD, LP, DL	1	17	13	—	19	—	6	8	—	9
2 Big to Rig	Released: 27 August 2026; Labels: Loma Vista; Formats: DL	—	—	—	—	—	—	—	—	—	—
"—" denotes a release that did not chart or was not issued in that region.

=== Compilation albums ===
List of compilation albums
Title	Album details
Message from the Clergy	Released: 12 September 2022; Format: Digital download
13 Commandments	Released: 1 December 2023; Format: Streaming, digital download

== Extended plays ==
List of extended plays, with selected chart positions
Title	EP details	Chart peaks										Sales
Title	EP details	SWE	SWE Rock	CAN	FIN	FRA	GER	SCO	UK	UK Rock	US	Sales
If You Have Ghost	Released: 19 November 2013; Labels: Loma Vista, Universal; Formats: CD, 12", DL	—	—	—	—	—	—	—	172	11	87	
Popestar	Released: 16 September 2016; Labels: Loma Vista, Universal; Formats: CD, 12", DL	3	1	7	12	27	—	32	85	6	16	US: 21,000
Phantomime	Released: 19 May 2023; Labels: Loma Vista, Universal; Formats: CD, 12", DL	1	1	15	6	18	11	3	8	3	7	
"—" denotes a release that did not chart or was not issued in that region.

== 7" Vinyl ==
List of extended plays, with selected chart positions
Title	EP details	Chart peaks									
Title	EP details	SWE	SWE Rock	CAN	FIN	FRA	GER	SCO	UK	UK Rock	US
Seven Inches of Satanic Panic	Released: 13 September 2019; Labels: Loma Vista, Universal; Formats: 7" single, DL	—	—	—	—	—	—	—	—	—	—
"—" denotes a release that did not chart or was not issued in that region.

== Singles ==
List of singles, with selected chart positions, showing year released and album name
Title	Year	Peak chart positions										Certifications	Album / E.P.
Title	Year	SWE	AUS	BEL Fla.	CAN	FIN	GER	UK	US	US Main.	US Rock	Certifications	Album / E.P.
"Elizabeth"	2010	—	—	—	—	—	—	—	—	—	—		Opus Eponymous
"Secular Haze"	2012	—	—	—	—	22	—	—	—	—	—		Infestissumam
"Year Zero"	2013	—	—	—	—	—	—	—	—	—	—	GLF: Gold	Infestissumam
"Cirice"	2015	—	—	—	—	—	—	—	—	4	46	GLF: Gold; MC: Gold; RIAA: Gold	Meliora
"From the Pinnacle to the Pit"	2015	—	—	— (Note: "From the Pinnacle to the Pit" did not enter the Ultratop 50, but registered on the Ultratip Bubbling Under chart.)	—	—	—	—	—	5	—		Meliora
"Majesty"	2015	—	—	—	—	—	—	—	—	—	—		Meliora
"Square Hammer"	2016	75	—	—	—	—	—	—	—	1	23	IFPI NOR: Gold; BPI: Silver; MC: Gold; RIAA: Platinum	Popestar (Note: "Square Hammer" was also included on the deluxe reissue of Meliora.)
"Rats"	2018	83	—	— (Note: "Rats" did not enter the Ultratop 50, but peaked at number 28 on the Ultratip Bubbling Under chart.)	—	—	—	—	—	1	16	MC: Gold; RIAA: Gold	Prequelle
"Dance Macabre"	2018	68	—	— (Note: "Dance Macabre" did not enter the Ultratop 50, but peaked at number seven on the Ultratip Bubbling Under chart.)	—	—	—	—	—	1	17	IFPI NOR: Gold; MC: Gold; PMB: Gold; RIAA: Platinum	Prequelle
"Faith"	2019	100	—	—	—	—	—	—	—	6	—		Prequelle
"Kiss the Go-Goat"	2019	— (Note: "Kiss the Go-Goat" did not enter the Swedish Singellista Chart, but peaked at number 19 on the Swedish Heatseeker Chart.)	—	— (Note: "Kiss the Go-Goat" did not enter the Ultratop 50, but peaked at number 32 on the Ultratip Bubbling Under chart.)	—	—	—	— (Note: "Kiss the Go-Goat" did not enter the UK Singles Chart, but peaked at number 14 on the UK Singles Sales Chart.)	— (Note: "Kiss the Go-Goat" did not enter the US Billboard Hot 100, but peaked at number 42 on the US Digital Song Sales chart.)	—	17		Seven Inches of Satanic Panic
"Mary on a Cross"	2019	16	89	—	50	7	41	28	90	—	11	ARIA: Platinum; BPI: Platinum; MC: Gold; PMB: 2× Platinum; RIAA: 2× Platinum; RMNZ: Platinum; SNEP: Gold; ZPAV: 2× Platinum	Seven Inches of Satanic Panic
"Hunter's Moon"	2021	82	—	—	—	—	—	— (Note: "Hunter's Moon" did not enter the UK Singles Chart, but peaked at number 23 on the UK Singles Sales Chart.)	—	1	36		Impera
"Enter Sandman" (Note: Released as a digital single and as a track on The Metallica Blacklist.)	2021	—	—	—	—	—	—	—	—	—	—		The Metallica Blacklist
"Call Me Little Sunshine"	2022	69	—	—	—	—	—	— (Note: "Call Me Little Sunshine" did not enter the UK Singles Chart, but peaked at number 87 on the UK Singles Sales Chart.)	—	1	34	MC: Gold; RIAA: Gold	Impera
"Twenties"	2022	— (Note: "Twenties" did not enter the Swedish Singellista Chart, but peaked at number 12 on the Swedish Heatseeker Chart.)	—	—	—	—	—	—	—	—	—		Impera
"Spillways" (solo or featuring Joe Elliott)	2022	— (Note: "Spillways" did not enter the Swedish Singellista Chart, but peaked at number two on the Swedish Heatseeker Chart.)	—	—	—	—	—	—	—	5	—		Impera
"Mary on a Cross" (Slowed + Reverb)	2022	—	—	—	—	—	—	—	—	—	—		Non-album single
"Jesus He Knows Me"	2023	— (Note: "Jesus He Knows Me" did not enter the Swedish Singellista Chart, but peaked at number 19 on the Swedish Heatseeker Chart.)	—	—	—	—	—	— (Note: "Jesus He Knows Me" did not enter the UK Singles Chart, but peaked at number 62 on the UK Singles Sales Chart.)	—	13	—		Phantomime
"Phantom of the Opera"	2023	—	—	—	—	—	—	—	—	—	—		Phantomime
"Stay" (featuring Patrick Wilson)	2023	—	—	—	—	—	—	—	— (Note: "Stay" did not enter the US Billboard Hot 100, but peaked at number 26 on the US Digital Song Sales chart.)	—	—		Non-album single
"The Future Is a Foreign Land"	2024	—	—	—	—	—	—	— (Note: "The Future Is a Foregin Land" did not enter the UK Singles Chart, but peaked at number 62 on the UK Singles Sales Chart.)	—	—	—		Rite Here Rite Now
"Satanized"	2025	75	—	—	—	—	—	— (Note: "Satanized" did not enter the UK Singles Chart, but peaked at number 57 on the UK Singles Sales Chart.)	—	6	32		Skeletá
"Lachryma"	2025	67	—	—	—	—	—	86	—	2	30		Skeletá
"Peacefield"	2025	28	—	—	—	44	—	—	—	—	31		Skeletá
"It's a Sin"	2026	—	—	—	—	—	—	—	—	—	—		Non-album single
"—" denotes a release that did not chart or was not issued in that region.

== Other charted and certified songs ==
List of other songs, with selected chart positions, showing year released, album name and certifications
Title	Year	Peaks			Certifications	Album
Title	Year	US Hard Rock	SWE	BEL Wal.	Certifications	Album
"He Is"	2015	—	64	— (Note: "He Is" did not enter the Ultratop 50, but registered on the Ultratop Bubbling Under chart.)	GLF: Platinum; IFPI NOR: Gold	Meliora
"See the Light"	2018	—	—	— (Note: "See the Light" did not enter the Swedish Singellista Chart, but peaked at number five on the Swedish Heatseeker Chart.)		Prequelle
"Pro Memoria"	2018	—	— (Note: "Pro Memoria" did not enter the Swedish Singellista Chart, but peaked at number seven on the Swedish Heatseeker Chart.)	—		Prequelle
"Miasma"	2018	—	— (Note: "Miasma" did not enter the Swedish Singellista Chart, but peaked at number eight on the Swedish Heatseeker Chart.)	—		Prequelle
"Witch Image"	2018	—	— (Note: "Witch Image" did not enter the Swedish Singellista Chart, but peaked at number 11 on the Swedish Heatseeker Chart.)	—		Prequelle
"Life Eternal"	2018	—	— (Note: "Life Eternal" did not enter the Swedish Singellista Chart, but peaked at number 14 on the Swedish Heatseeker Chart.)	—		Prequelle
"Kaisarion"	2022	9	— (Note: "Kaisarion" did not enter the Swedish Singellista Chart, but peaked at number three on the Swedish Heatseeker Chart.)	—		Impera
"Watcher in the Sky"	2022	14	95	—		Impera
"Darkness at the Heart of My Love"	2022	19	— (Note: "Darkness at the Heart of My Love" did not enter the Swedish Singellista Chart, but peaked at number 16 on the Swedish Heatseeker Chart.)	—		Impera
"Imperium"	2022	24	—	—		Impera
"Griftwood"	2022	20	—	—		Impera
"Guiding Lights"	2025	15	— (Note: "Guiding Lights" did not enter the Swedish Singellista Chart, but peaked at number one on the Swedish Heatseeker Chart.)	—		Skeletá
"De Profundis Borealis"	2025	18	— (Note: "De Profundis Borealis" did not enter the Swedish Singellista Chart, but peaked at number two on the Swedish Heatseeker Chart.)	—		Skeletá
"Cenotaph"	2025	20	— (Note: "Cenotaph" did not enter the Swedish Singellista Chart, but peaked at number three on the Swedish Heatseeker Chart.)	—		Skeletá
"Missilia Amori"	2025	19	— (Note: "Missilia Amori" did not enter the Swedish Singellista Chart, but peaked at number eight on the Swedish Heatseeker Chart.)	—		Skeletá
"Marks of the Evil One"	2025	16	— (Note: "Marks of the Evil One" did not enter the Swedish Singellista Chart, but peaked at number six on the Swedish Heatseeker Chart.)	—		Skeletá
"Umbra"	2025	17	— (Note: "Umbra" did not enter the Swedish Singellista Chart, but peaked at number seven on the Swedish Heatseeker Chart.)	—		Skeletá
"—" denotes a release that did not chart or was not issued in that region.

== Music videos ==
List of music videos, showing year released, album name and directors
Title	Year	Album	Director(s)	Ref.
"Secular Haze"	2013	Infestissumam	Amir Chamdin	
"Year Zero"	2013	Infestissumam	Amir Chamdin	
"Monstrance Clock"	2013	Infestissumam	Rob Semmer	
"Cirice"	2015	Meliora	Roboshobo	
"From the Pinnacle to the Pit"	2015	Meliora	Zev Deans	
"Square Hammer"	2016	Popestar	Zev Deans	
"He Is"	2017	Meliora	Zev Deans	
"Rats"	2018	Prequelle	Roboshobo	
"Dance Macabre"	2018	Prequelle	Zev Deans	
"Kiss the Go-Goat"	2019	Seven Inches of Satanic Panic	Unknown	
"Life Eternal"	2021	Prequelle	Unknown	
"Hunter's Moon"	2021	Impera	Amanda Demme	
"Call Me Little Sunshine"	2022	Impera	Matt Mahurin	
"Spillways"	2022	Impera	Amir Chamdin	
"Jesus He Knows Me"	2023	Phantomime	Alex Ross Perry	
"Mary On A Cross"	2024	Seven Inches of Satanic Panic	DurtySean	
"The Future Is A Foreign Land"	2024	Rite Here Rite Now (Original Motion Picture Soundtrack)	DurtySean	
"Satanized"	2025	Skeletá	Amir Chamdin	
"Lachryma"	2025	Skeletá	Amir Chamdin	
"Peacefield"	2025	Skeletá	Amir Chamdin	
"Umbra"	2026	Skeletá	Amir Chamdin	
