= Halloween Kills (soundtrack) =

Halloween Kills (Original Motion Picture Soundtrack)

Film score by John Carpenter, Cody Carpenter and Daniel Davies
- Released: October 14, 2021
- Recorded: 2019–2021
- Genres: Electronic; film score
- Length: 43:51
- Label: Sacred Bones

John Carpenter chronology
Lost Themes III: Alive After Death (2021)	Halloween Kills (2021)	Firestarter (2022)

Cody Carpenter chronology
Memories and Dreams (2021)	Halloween Kills (2021)	Balance of Extremes (2022)

Daniel Davies chronology
Lost Themes III: Alive After Death (2021)	Halloween Kills (2021)	Lost in Departures (2021)

Singles from Halloween Kills (Original Motion Picture Soundtrack)
- 1. "Unkillable" Released: August 19, 2021; 2. "Rampage" Released: September 7, 2021; 3. "Michael's Legend" Released: September 25, 2021

Halloween Kills (Original Motion Picture Soundtrack) is the soundtrack album to the 2021 film Halloween Kills, directed by David Gordon Green; a sequel to Green's Halloween (2018) and the twelfth instalment in the Halloween franchise. John Carpenter, Cody Carpenter and Daniel Davies, who previously scored for the first film, returned for the sequel. As similar to the predecessor, John had reused the original theme from the 1978 film using modern interpretations.

Halloween Kills soundtrack featured 20-tracks, mostly consisting of John, Cody and Davies' score, and was led by three singles: "Unkillable", "Rampage" and "Michael's Legend". A non-album single titled "Hunter's Moon" performed by Ghost, was also released, that feature in the end credits. The album, distributed by Sacred Bones Records, had a limited release in ITunes on October 14, 2021, and later released through multiple music platforms, the following day, on October 15, which coincides the film's release. It was also distributed in CD, LP and cassettes. John's score received generally positive response from critics, and the score album debuted at number 9 in Billboard Top Album Sales for the week beginning October 23.

== Development ==
"We started on the Halloween movies with two things. One, we have the midi from the original score; by that I mean, we have the original score I did years ago – the various songs with that. Then we tend to update them, adapt them, and use parts of them there and there. Once we're dealing with the movie and we're watching it, then we can work with new material – that's all improvised."

— John Carpenter, on scoring the new Halloween instalments.

John who also scored for the 1978 film, had modernised the original theme from the film, with different sounds and approaches, as he did for the soundtrack of the 2018 reboot, as he felt that "[There] are brand new sounds that are constantly being updated. That's where the inspiration comes from", appreciating the modern innovations applied in this generation. He, along with Cody and Davies, had worked on the score before 2019, as the film was shot back-to-back with Halloween Ends (2022), and scoring was completed before the COVID-19 pandemic.

As with all of his ventures, John had begun scoring the film, only after watching the final cut as "I generally know what I want to do in terms of atmosphere [coming into a film], but we score to the movie. It's exact; I want the final cut in my computer and then we start scoring to it. I don't think about [particular musical ideas] ahead of time." Like the first film's soundtrack, the music of Kills rely on the sonic and electronic music, with gentle compositions turning into adrenaline rushes in the latter half. According to Green, "his [John] music does both of those things, too. You'll see sometimes it's very methodical and slow-paced and pulsating. Other times, it's just a frenzy of synthesizers."

== Release ==
Halloween Kills' soundtrack, containing the original score, is led by two singles. Coinciding the album's announcement, the first song "Unkillable" was released on August 19, 2021, which was followed by the second song "Rampage" was released on September 7, and the third track "Michael's Legend" released on September 25. A single titled "Hunter's Moon" performed by the Swedish rock band Ghost, was released on September 30; although the track was not featured in the soundtrack, it would play in the film's end credits.

Sacred Bones Records released the soundtrack exclusively through ITunes on October 14, 2021, and expanded widely through digital media services, the following day. The album was later released in CD, LP and cassettes. Sacred Bones and Waxwork Records collaborated for releasing the soundtrack in vinyl, under the catalog code SBR-263. The copies consisted on 13 editions, with multi-color variants, available in different stores, packaging and titles in several regions. These editions are priced from £150 (US$205.48) to £2,000 (US$2,739.73). In conjunction with the album release, Sacred Bones marketed the album in a "Trick or Treat" tote bag, priced at £15 (US$20.55), featuring an artwork of Michael Myers character. The following are the vinyl variants released in multiple formats:

- Sacred Bones Record Society Flame Flicker
- Sacred Bones Records Art Edition (Mail-order Exclusive)
- Sacred Bones Records Molten Vinyl (Mail-order Exclusive)
- Orange Vinyl
- Black Vinyl (Charred Pumpkin)
- Orange and black splatter (UK Exclusive)
- Orange, black and white swirl (Waxworks exclusive)
- Orange and white (Cargo Germany exclusive)
- Swamp Green (Bull Moose Exclusive)
- Orange/Red Split With Black Splatter (Newbury Comics Exclusive)
- Orange and Black (BrooklynVegan Exclusive)
- Clear With Black & Orange Splatter (Shout! Factory Exclusive)

An expanded score, featuring twenty-five unreleased tracks, was released on October 3, 2025.

== Track listing ==
All music is composed by John Carpenter, Cody Carpenter and Daniel Davies.

Halloween Kills (Original Motion Picture Soundtrack)
No.	Title	Length
1.	"Logos Kill"	1:21
2.	"Halloween Kills (Main Title)"	1:46
3.	"The Myers'House"	0:41
4.	"First Attack"	0:57
5.	"Stand Off"	1:41
6.	"Let It Burn"	1:13
7.	"He Appears"	0:59
8.	"From the Fire"	1:18
9.	"Strodes at the Hospital"	2:25
10.	"Cruel Intentions"	2:37
11.	"Gather the Mob"	1:11
12.	"Rampage"	4:58
13.	"Frank and Laurie"	1:49
14.	"Hallway Madness"	1:37
15.	"It Needs to Die"	6:52
16.	"Reflection"	1:27
17.	"Unkillable"	3:44
18.	"Payback"	2:31
19.	"Michael's Legend"	2:36
20.	"Halloween Kills (End Titles)"	3:08
Total length:		43:00

== Reception ==
The review aggregator Metacritic, which uses a weighted average, assigned Halloween (Original 2018 Motion Picture Soundtrack) a score of 72 out of 100 based on 9 critics, indicating "generally favorable reviews". Spectrum Culture's Will Pinfold gave 77/100 to the score, and wrote, "John Carpenter's soundtrack to the latest Halloween movie is all that one would expect – entirely predictable, but it nevertheless effortlessly rises above mere pastiche." David Weaver of Clash wrote "While casual listeners might find the overall listen a bit sparse, there's no doubt it's the perfect soundtrack to a Halloween party, or indeed a Halloween Movie. It might not be re-writing the rulebook, but when the rulebook you wrote is so simply effective in the first place, why change it?" Heather Phares of Allmusic wrote, "It all goes to show that Carpenter's knack for composing scores that are entertaining in their own right is alive and well, and just as engrossing nearly half a century after the first Halloween slashed its way onto the silver screen."

Hanna Collins of Buzz Magazine, gave 3/5 to the album, and wrote, "Part of the umpteenth attempt to reboot the slow-walking series, Kills' music keeps it in the family: Carpenter is joined by son Cody and godson Daniel Davies. The result is a nostalgic blend of twinkling synth, brooding soundscapes and punchy drumbeats that'll sneak up on you between tracks. Not something to kick back and relax with – unless you're Michael Myers – but full of the thrills and chills you'd want to wile away a cold, dark night from an artist who remains at the peak of his craft, 40 years on." Filmtracks.com wrote, "Overall, the score hits all the right basic notes but sounds incredibly cheap given the filmmakers' intent to instill a greater sense of gravity in this score. The impact simply isn't there, most cues neglecting to generate even moderate doses of dread, and only the most avid franchise enthusiasts will appreciate the continued variations on the main theme and its rhythm [...] None of these modes of presentation will convince you that anything's new or scary in this sequel, however, the music and its creator potentially running out of inspiration even if the body count mercilessly continues to climb."

=== Accolades ===
Their work on the soundtrack won the award for "Best Score" at the 2022 Fangoria Chainsaw Awards. It was also nominated at the Indiana Film Journalists Association for "Best Musical Score".

== Chart performance ==
Chart (2021)	Peak position
UK Soundtrack Albums (OCC)	33
US Top Album Sales (Billboard)	9
US Soundtrack Albums (Billboard)	15
