= Secular Haze =

Single by Ghost

from the album Infestissumam
- B-side: "I'm a Marionette"
- Released: December 15, 2012
- Recorded: 2012, Blackbird Studio, Studio 606
- Genre: Heavy metal; progressive rock; waltz; carnival
- Length: 5:11
- Label: Loma Vista
- Songwriter: Tobias Forge
- Producer: Nick Raskulinecz

Ghost singles chronology
"Elizabeth" (2010)	"Secular Haze" (2012)	"Year Zero" (2013)

"Secular Haze" is a song by the Swedish rock band Ghost that appears as the third track on their second studio album, Infestissumam (2013). It was written by vocalist Tobias Forge and produced by Nick Raskulinecz. The song features a heavy metal, progressive rock, waltz and carnival sound, influenced by 1960s psychedelia and 1970s doom metal.

"Secular Haze" was released on December 15, 2012 as the lead single from Infestissumam. It became the band's first charting song, reaching number 22 on The Official Finnish Charts.

== Background ==
On December 14, 2012, the website SecularHaze.com was created by Ghost. The website contained a sound clip of a new Ghost song without vocals. On the page was a clock ticking backward and five candles, each playing one element of the new song when the user hovered over it with the mouse.

The next day, the band uploaded a new song to their official YouTube channel, also called "Secular Haze". Later that day, they performed a special concert in their hometown of Linköping, Sweden, performing the entire Opus Eponymous record along with "Secular Haze" and their cover of "I'm a Marionette". Before "Secular Haze" was performed, Papa Emeritus, the band's vocalist, disappeared into the black of the stage to be replaced by Papa Emeritus II. After this concert, SecularHaze.com was updated to include a sixth candle containing the vocal track of the song "Secular Haze". Four days later, the band announced the title of their second album, Infestissumam, along with the webpage Infestissumam.com which showed the album's track list.

== Release ==
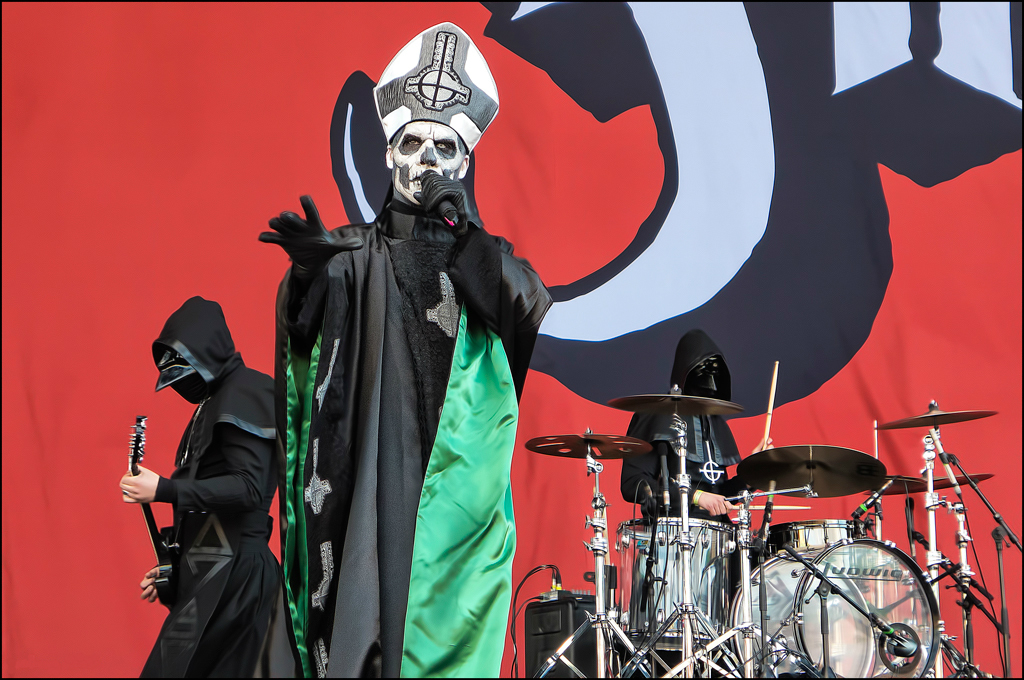
Ghost performing in Spain at the Sonisphere Festival, 2013

"Secular Haze" was the album's first single, given as a free digital download to fans signing up to the band's mailing list from December 15, 2012. A limited pressing of 10" vinyl records of the single was later released. On choosing "Secular Haze" as the first single, a Ghoul said "we wanted to present a song from the new record that sort of stood on its own but without being too far off from the first record".

The single's B-side is the cover of ABBA's "I'm a Marionette", which features Dave Grohl of Nirvana and Foo Fighters on drums as well as production. The collaboration happened when, before going to Nashville to record the album, Ghost had a bunch of covers demoed and were discussing if they should squeeze them onto the album. " ... we were at a festival in Europe and Foo Fighters was playing, and we knew that Dave was a fan, and [when we talked to him] after a few handshakes and a few laughs, we were like Okay, so you liked the band? So do you want to do something? And he said yeah, and one month later we were in [his studio in] L.A. doing that." Ghost's version of "I'm a Marionette" was included on the deluxe and Japanese editions of Infestissumam. It and the other material recorded with Grohl was also released on the If You Have Ghost EP, which also includes a live performance of "Secular Haze". The band Tub Ring covered the song on their 2017 album A Choice of Catastrophes.

== Music video ==
Ghost recorded their first music video for "Secular Haze" in Linköping, with director Amir Chamdin. It was uploaded to the band's official YouTube channel on February 19, 2013. The video shows a performance of the band on a stage, reminiscent of a 1970s television show.

== Track listing ==
No.	Title	Writer(s)	Length
1.	"Secular Haze"	A Ghoul Writer	5:11
2.	"I'm a Marionette" (ABBA cover)	Benny Andersson; Björn Ulvaeus	4:52

== Personnel ==
- Papa Emeritus II − vocals
- Nameless Ghouls – all instrumentalists: lead guitarist, bassist, keyboardist, drummer, rhythm guitarist
- Dave Grohl – drums and production on "I'm a Marionette"
- Alan Forbes – artwork
