= Call Me Little Sunshine =

2022 song by Ghost

Single by Ghost

from the album Impera
- Released: January 20, 2022
- Genre: Arena rock; pop rock
- Length: 4:44
- Label: Loma Vista
- Songwriters: Tobias Forge; Max Grahn
- Producers: Klas Åhlund; Fat Max Gsus

Ghost singles chronology
"Hunter's Moon" (2021)	"Call Me Little Sunshine" (2022)	"Twenties" (2022)

Music video
- "Call Me Little Sunshine" on YouTube

"Call Me Little Sunshine" is a song by the Swedish rock band Ghost. It was released on January 20, 2022, as the second single from the band's fifth studio album, Impera. The song reached No. 1 on the US Billboard Mainstream Rock Airplay chart in May 2022, and was nominated for Best Metal Performance at the 65th Annual Grammy Awards.

== Background and release ==
Tobias Forge said that "Call Me Little Sunshine" was probably the first song he wrote for Impera. He made a demo of it in 2018 or 2019 and explained that its slow tempo helped establish the album's tone. "Hunter's Moon" was the next song he wrote, which he described as more upbeat.

Ghost released the song as a single on January 20, 2022. Its accompanying music video was described by Revolver as "surreal" and "cinematic". The release marked the band's first new music since "Hunter's Moon", which had been released in 2021 for the film Halloween Kills.

== Lyrics and themes ==
Forge explained that "Call Me Little Sunshine" features the Devil speaking to someone in front of their computer or in their room, saying, "I'm always here for you." He added, "In this context, it's not a good thing." Distorted Sound writer Tasha Brown interpreted the song's "call me" as coming from the Devil rather than a saviour, describing it as "the devil in the doorway". Revolver wrote that Papa Emeritus IV takes the role of Mephistopheles, also known as Little Sunshine, who can "save" the listener when they "feel all alone". NME described the song as more hopeful than the material on Ghost's previous album, Prequelle.

== Composition ==
Forge said he had not deliberately set out to repeat "Cirice", explaining that the songs shared a similar slow, "creepy vibe".

Laut.de described the track as both pop rock and heavy, noting its almost majestic, rolling sound and its resemblance to the atmosphere of Prequelle. Stereoboard called it a "down-tempo yet catchy, atmospheric song with doomy riffs". Consequence described the song as leaning toward the band's theatrical rock style, with "meaty riffs" but without becoming too heavy. In its coverage of the band's television performance, Consequence called the song "catchy, classic FM rock". Loudwire writer Philip Trapp said it encapsulated the band's "kitschy but ominous approach". Revolver described it as featuring doomy riffs, foreboding verses and a bombastic, almost holy-sounding chorus. Blabbermouth.net reviewer Dom Lawson called it a "doomy but romantic ballad" and a possible "missing link" between Black Sabbath and ABBA.

Loudwire writer Joe DiVita noted that a mid-paced hook riff opens the track and continues through the verse and chorus, countering the bombast of "Hunter's Moon". AllMusic critic Thom Jurek wrote that the song opens with a "crunchy vamp" leading into a minor-key, multitracked vocal, followed by drums and a booming chorus chant. He said the chant suggested 1980s Def Leppard. Guitar World writer Matt Owen described the song as combining clean guitar parts with high-gain electric guitars, comparing the latter to the stomping riffs of AC/DC's "Hells Bells". He also noted that the staggered rhythmic turnarounds between passages were heavily influenced by "Hells Bells" and that the guitar solo was assembled from pentatonic licks and scale runs.

MetalSucks described the track as featuring raspier vocals and solid guitar riffs over doomy background chants. Tasha Brown of Distorted Sound noted the song's echoed drums, rounder riffs, intermittent chants, harmonised vocals, organ parts and dual-guitar solo. She also described its choruses as "arena-filling". In his review of Impera, Adrien Begrand of PopMatters wrote that the track revisits the "doomy dread" of "Cirice" and is built around a "spiraling seven-note riff" whose simplicity would make Tony Iommi proud.

== Critical reception ==
Metal Hammer described "Call Me Little Sunshine" as "haunting" while NME called it "thundering".

Metal Injection writer Jordan Blum described the song as a "heartfelt, almost pastoral ode" with "just enough edge to satisfy". Kerrang! writer James Hickie considered it more like "old-school Ghost" and called it "the cousin" of "Cirice". Manus Hopkins of Exclaim! described the song as one of the strongest in Ghost's catalogue, writing that it featured "one of the catchiest riffs" in the band's career. Sputnikmusic reviewer Dewinged wrote that the track worked better in the context of the album than it had as a single. Angry Metal Guy contributor Felagund described the song as a throwback to the band's debut album, Opus Eponymous.

Loudwire included the song in its list of the 50 Best Rock + Metal Songs of 2022. Trapp described the band's music as fusing "the flash of glam with the grit of heavy metal" and wrote that the song demonstrated this musical approach.

== Live performances ==
Ghost performed "Call Me Little Sunshine" on Jimmy Kimmel Live! on March 16, 2022, in a pre-recorded performance filmed at the historic Mountain View Mausoleum in Altadena, California. The appearance marked the band's debut on the programme. Papa Emeritus IV and the band's clergy took part, with Consequence writer Jon Hadusek describing Papa's presentation as "sermon-like" and saying Ghost were musically "airtight". The band wore their signature costumes and gas masks and performed beneath the mausoleum's stained-glass windows amid light projections. Revolver also described the building's architecture as weathered and its lighting as "moody".

Ghost first performed the song live on April 9, 2022, at the AO Arena in Manchester, England, during the opening concert of the band's European tour.

== Music video ==
An animated music video for the song was released alongside the announcement of Impera on January 20, 2022. The video was directed by Matt Mahurin and stars Ruby Modine.

== Cover versions ==
Fabienne Erni, singer of Swiss folk-metal band Eluveitie, announced a cover of "Call Me Little Sunshine" on Instagram on February 5, 2023. Her version was arranged as a piano ballad. Metal Injection described her version as using a different harmonic vocabulary behind the original melody. Erni said she had experimented with reharmonisations for the arrangement. She credited Vidick of Infected Rain with work on the video and recordings, and Voluta Valentin with mixing and mastering the cover.

== Track listing ==
All tracks are written by Max Grahn and Tobias Forge, with additional writer where noted.

"Call Me Little Sunshine" single
No.	Title	Length
1.	"Call Me Little Sunshine"	4:44
2.	"Hunter's Moon" (Klas Åhlund)	3:16
Total length:		8:00

== Personnel ==
Credits adapted from Apple Music.

Ghost

- Papa Emeritus IV – vocals, keyboards, bass, guitar
- A Group of Nameless Ghouls

Additional personnel

- Fredrik Åkesson – guitars
- Martin Hederos – organ
- Hux Nettermalm – drums

Technical

- Klas Åhlund – production, recording
- Fat Max Gsus – production, recording
- Andy Wallace – mixing
- Ted Jensen – mastering
- Martin Eriksson Sandmark – recording
- Stefan Boman – recording
- Dan Malsch – recording

== Awards and nominations ==
Award nominations for "Call Me Little Sunshine"
Year	Ceremony	Award	Result	Ref(s)
2023	Grammy Awards (65th)	Best Metal Performance	Nominated	

== Chart performance ==
"Call Me Little Sunshine" reached No. 1 on the Billboard Mainstream Rock Airplay chart, becoming the band's fifth No. 1 single on the chart and its second from Impera, following "Hunter's Moon".

=== Weekly charts ===
Weekly chart performance for "Call Me Little Sunshine"
Chart (2022)	Peak position
Canada Rock (Billboard)	13
Czech Republic (Modern Rock)	11
Sweden (Sverigetopplistan)	69
UK Singles Downloads (OCC)	86
UK Singles Sales (OCC)	87
US Rock Digital Song Sales (Billboard)	18
US Rock & Alternative Airplay (Billboard)	10
US Hot Rock & Alternative Songs (Billboard)	34
US Mainstream Rock Airplay (Billboard)	1

=== Year-end charts ===
Year-end chart performance for "Call Me Little Sunshine"
Chart (2022)	Position
US Rock & Alternative Airplay (Billboard)	39
US Mainstream Rock Airplay (Billboard)	8

== Certifications ==
Certifications for "Call Me Little Sunshine"
Region	Certification	Certified units/sales
Canada (Music Canada)	Gold	40,000^{‡}
United States (RIAA)	Gold	500,000^{‡}
^{‡} Sales+streaming figures based on certification alone.
