= Infinite Mass =

Swedish hip hop group

- Origin: Sweden
- Genres: Hip-hop
- Years active: 1991– Still active
- Members: Amir Chamdin; Rodrigo Pencheff; Bechir Eklund

Infinite Mass is a Swedish hip-hop group. Formed in 1991, they have since released four albums and eight singles.

== Biography ==
The group formed in 1991. In 1992 they won the Swedish Championship of Rap talent show. The same year, they appeared in the movie Sökarna, and released the single "Shoot the Racist", later renamed "Area Turns Red". The lyrics of the song attracted some media controversy in Sweden at the time.

The group had their first chart hits in 1995, with the songs "Mah boys", "Area Turns Red" and "Ride". They won a Grammis Award for best club/dance song in 1995. In 1997 they released the album Alwayz Somethang and the single "Caught up in da Game". Their album The Face (2001), and songs "She’s A Freak", "Bullet", "Blazin" and "Enter The Dragon", established their characteristic sound, of a G-funk bass with a blend of heavy guitars, rapping, singing and unusual samples. In 2004, their song "No. 1 Swartskalle" became a hit.

== Group members ==
Amir Chamdin, Rodrigo "Rigo" Pencheff and Bechir Eklund are regarded as the core members of the group, having been members of the group since its foundation.

- Amir Chamdin (Rap)
- Rodrigo "Rigo" Pencheff (Rap)
- Bechir Eklund (Rap)
- Joen Carlstedt (Guitar)
- Jejo Perkovic (Drums)
- Tito Pencheff (Synthesizer)
- Cribbe Pencheff (DJ)
- Polarbear (Rap/Production)

== Discography ==
=== Studio albums ===
- The Infinite Patio (1995)
- Alwayz Somethang (1997)
- The Face (2001)
- 1991 (2004)

=== Live albums ===
- Live In Sweden (1999)

=== Compilation albums ===
- Masters of the Universe: The Best of Infinite Mass (2007)

=== Singles ===
- "Mah Boyz" (1995)
- "Area Turns Red" (1995)
- "Ride" (1996)
- "Enter the Dragon" (2000)
- "Bullet" (2001)
- "The Thief" (2004)
- "No 1 Svartskalle" (2004)
- "Take it Back" (2020)

== See also ==
- Swedish hip hop
