= Halloween Ends (soundtrack) =

Halloween Ends (Original Motion Picture Soundtrack)

Film score by John Carpenter, Cody Carpenter and Daniel Davies
- Released: October 13, 2022
- Recorded: 2021–2022
- Genre: Electronic
- Length: 42:29
- Label: Sacred Bones

John Carpenter chronology
| Firestarter (2022) | Halloween Ends (2022) | Anthology II: Movie Themes 1976–1988 (2023) |

Cody Carpenter chronology
| Firestarter (2022) | Halloween Ends (2022) | Anthology II: Movie Themes 1976–1988 (2023) |

Daniel Davies chronology
| Firestarter (2022) | Halloween Ends (2022) | Anthology II: Movie Themes 1976–1988 (2023) |

Singles from Halloween Ends (Original Motion Picture Soundtrack)
- 1. "The Junk Yard" Released: September 13, 2022; 2. "The Procession" Released: September 27, 2022

Halloween Ends (Original Motion Picture Soundtrack) is the soundtrack album to the 2022 film Halloween Ends, directed by David Gordon Green; a sequel to Halloween Kills (2021), the thirteenth instalment in the Halloween franchise and the final film in the trilogy of sequels that started with the 2018 film, which directly follows the 1978 film. John Carpenter, Cody Carpenter and Daniel Davies, returned for Ends after previously scored for the first two entries in the franchise.

The album was released by Sacred Bones Records first on iTunes on October 13, 2022, and later through other music platforms the following day on October 14, which coincides the film's release. It was led by two singles: "The Junk Yard" and "The Procession", released during September 2022. Alongside the soundtrack, a non-album single performed by the electronic music group Boy Harsher, "Burn it Down" was also released in conjunction with the film's release. The album was released in vinyl formats on January 20, 2023.

== Development ==
Despite being shot simultaneously with the predecessor, Halloween Kills (2021), the scoring for Ends happened only after late 2021, as production of the film interrupted due to COVID-19 pandemic, and completed by September 2022. The score was recorded at both John and Davies' home studios. Like the previous Halloween installments, John had incorporated the original Halloween theme from the 1978 film, using electronic instruments and synthesisers. The electronic music group Boy Harsher, also worked with John, Cody and Davies on the original music.

John added: "The movie's so different that we had to do everything differently [...] [David Gordon Green] challenged us on a couple of things, which was great, then gave us ultimate freedom on a couple others, which is also great. We had a great time working with him. He's a wonderful director. Knows what he wants, not afraid to take chances. He really did a terrific job. This one's a totally different movie. And it was like a puzzle to figure out how to put this thing together, but he did, and did it well." He further believed that "everything just comes out of the story and the characters. So if we have a new character, like we do with Halloween Ends, we developed a theme for them. And we utilize that, but sometimes we use the old stuff. All of this is a matter of judgment and instinct."

== Release ==
The soundtrack was announced in September 2022, and in anticipation of the film's premiere, two tracks were released: "The Junk Yard" and "The Procession". The album was released by Sacred Bones Records on October 13, 2022, in iTunes and received wide digital release, the following day. Boy Harsher's original song "Burn It Down" was released along with the film and album, on October 14. The album was released in vinyl in limited copies on January 20, 2023. An expanded score, featuring ten unreleased tracks, was released on October 3, 2025.

== Track listing ==
All tracks are written by John Carpenter, Cody Carpenter, and Daniel Davies.

Halloween Ends (Original Motion Picture Soundtrack)
| No. | Title | Length |
|---|---|---|
| 1. | "Where is Jeremy?" | 2:58 |
| 2. | "Halloween Ends (Main Title)" | 1:45 |
| 3. | "Laurie's Theme Ends" | 3:37 |
| 4. | "The Cave" | 0:21 |
| 5. | "Cool Kid" | 1:03 |
| 6. | "Drags to the Cave" | 0:40 |
| 7. | "Evil Eyes" | 2:02 |
| 8. | "Transformation" | 1:52 |
| 9. | "Because of You" | 1:29 |
| 10. | "Requiem for Jeremy" | 1:00 |
| 11. | "Kill the Cop" | 2:11 |
| 12. | "Corey and Michael" | 1:44 |
| 13. | "Corey's Requiem" | 2:01 |
| 14. | "The Junk Yard" | 4:11 |
| 15. | "Where Are You?" | 1:18 |
| 16. | "Bye Bye Corey" | 0:53 |
| 17. | "The Fight" | 3:48 |
| 18. | "Before Her Eyes" | 1:42 |
| 19. | "The Procession" | 3:03 |
| 20. | "Cherry Blossoms" | 1:59 |
| 21. | "Halloween Ends" | 3:03 |
| Total length: | | 42:00 |

== Personnel ==
- John Carpenter – production, keyboards
- Cody Carpenter – production, keyboards (all tracks); percussion (5)
- Daniel Davies – production, keyboards (all tracks); mixing (tracks 1, 2, 4–21), guitar (1, 2, 5, 19, 21), percussion (1, 2, 19, 21)
- John Spiker – mastering, mixing

== Reception ==
Michael James Hall, writing for Under the Radar gave 7.5 out of 10 to the album, saying "Carpenter may stick broadly to the synth-horror formula he created, but that’s no bad thing, imbuing the album with an uncanny, apt sense of nostalgia. While artists like Burial, Caretaker, and William Basinski continue to mine similarly rich themes of hauntology, Carpenter, who predates the entire genre, continues to add to it with ghoulish aplomb." Hanna Collins of Buzz Magazine wrote "the Halloween Ends OST is the combined stylings of series architect John Carpenter, his son Cody, and Daniel Davies, and while you might think there can’t be much more to squeeze out of a four-decades-old saga (much like the films themselves), this delivers in shovel loads." Filmtracks.com wrote "the mingling of the main theme and Corey's material in the first half is a solid step in that direction and will provide more interesting intellectual depth to an otherwise comfortable and established sound. Expect a decent farewell for an iconic theme."

=== Accolades ===
Their work on the soundtrack won the award for "Best Score" at the 2023 Fangoria Chainsaw Awards. It was also nominated at the 2022 Hollywood Music in Media Awards for "Best Original Score in a Horror Film".

== Charts ==
| Chart (2022) | Peak position |
|---|---|
| UK Soundtrack Albums (OCC) | 36 |
| US Soundtrack Albums (Billboard) | 22 |
