= Firestarter (soundtrack) =

2022 horror film soundtrack

Firestarter (Original Motion Picture Soundtrack)

Film score by John Carpenter, Cody Carpenter and Daniel Davies
- Released: May 13, 2022
- Recorded: 2022
- Venue: Back Lot Music
- Genre: Electronic; film score
- Length: 42:56
- Label: Sacred Bones
- Producer: John Carpenter, Cody Carpenter, and Daniel Davies

John Carpenter chronology
Halloween Kills (2021)	Firestarter (2022)	Halloween Ends (2022)

Cody Carpenter chronology
Balance of Extremes (2022)	Firestarter (2022)	Halloween Ends (2022)

Daniel Davies chronology
Lost in Departures (2021)	Firestarter (2022)	Halloween Ends (2022)

Professional ratings
Review scores
Source	Rating
AllMusic	3/5 stars

Firestarter (Original Motion Picture Soundtrack) is the soundtrack album to the 2022 horror film Firestarter, directed by Keith Thomas. John Carpenter, Cody Carpenter and Daniel Davies serve as composers.

The album was released by Sacred Bones Records on May 13, 2022, in conjunction with the film's release.

== Development ==
During filming of The Thing (1982), Universal offered John Carpenter to direct the original Firestarter film, who hired Bill Lancaster to adapt the novel into a screenplay, which Stephen King approved of. Months later, Carpenter hired Bill Phillips to write another version with Richard Dreyfuss as Andy, but when The Thing underperformed financially, Universal replaced Carpenter with Mark L. Lester, who brought Stanley Mann to write a screenplay that stayed closer to the novel than the abandoned screenplays that Carpenter had commissioned.

In February 2022, he, along with Cody Carpenter and Daniel Davies, were hired to score the remake for Blumhouse Productions, having previously collaborated with the studio on Halloween (2018) and Halloween Kills (2021). The score was digitally released on May 13, 2022, by Back Lot Music and on LP/CD and Cassette on October 14, 2022, by Sacred Bones Records.

== Track listing ==
All music is composed by John Carpenter, Cody Carpenter and Daniel Davies.

Firestarter (Original Motion Picture Soundtrack)
No.	Title	Length
1.	"Mother's Love"	3:08
2.	"Lot 6 (Main Titles)"	2:58
3.	"Are You Scared of Me?"	1:00
4.	"Dodge Ball Heats Up"	2:16
5.	"Corporate Menace"	1:36
6.	"Burned Hands"	2:50
7.	"Rainbird Fights Vicky"	1:48
8.	"Bless Mommy"	1:21
9.	"Flashback Kills"	2:51
10.	"Police Arrive"	2:22
11.	"Sniper Attack"	3:44
12.	"Charlie Alone"	0:36
13.	"Charlie's Powers"	1:53
14.	"I'll Find You"	3:03
15.	"Charlie's Rampage"	4:42
16.	"Rampage Ends"	2:52
17.	"Firestarter (End Titles)"	3:46
Total length:		42:56

== Personnel ==
- John Carpenter – production, keyboards
- Cody Carpenter – production, keyboards
- Daniel Davies – production, keyboards

== Reception ==
Frank Scheck of The Hollywood Reporter complimented the score, summarizing "in a nicely poetic touch, Carpenter, along with his musical collaborators Cody Carpenter and Daniel Davies, has provided a terrifically spooky electronic music score for this effort — perhaps its most distinguished element." Benjamin Lee of The Guardian also wrote "Scott Teems's drearily perfunctory script is at least not as howlingly bad as his script for Halloween Kills, a small mercy, although both films bizarrely share John Carpenter in charge of the music, his throwback synth score working at odds with Thomas's pedestrian aesthetic".

== Accolades ==
The soundtrack was nominated at the 2023 Golden Scythe Horror Awards for "Best Original Score".
