= Impera =

Studio album by Ghost
- Released: 11 March 2022
- Recorded: 2021
- Studios: Capitol (Hollywood); Atlantis Metronome (Stockholm); Apmamman (Stockholm)
- Genres: Hard rock; arena rock; glam metal; heavy metal; pop rock
- Length: 46:21
- Label: Loma Vista
- Producer: Klas Åhlund

Ghost chronology
Seven Inches of Satanic Panic (2019)	Impera (2022)	Phantomime (2023)

Singles from Impera
- 1. "Hunter's Moon" Released: 30 September 2021; 2. "Call Me Little Sunshine" Released: 20 January 2022; 3. "Twenties" Released: 2 March 2022; 4. "Spillways" Released: 27 July 2022

Impera is the fifth studio album by the Swedish rock band Ghost. Released on 11 March 2022, it was produced by Klas Åhlund who also produced the band's 2015 album, Meliora. The release of Impera was preceded by three singles: the first, "Hunter's Moon", was released on 30 September 2021 in support of the 2021 slasher film Halloween Kills with a version being a part of the film's closing credits; the second single, "Call Me Little Sunshine", was released on 20 January 2022 and the third, "Twenties", was released on 2 March 2022.

The theme of Impera mainly focuses on "the rise and fall of empires". Multiple outside songwriters assisted with the album, including pop producers Salem Al Fakir and Vincent Pontare, Kent lead singer Joakim Berg and The Cardigans guitarist Peter Svensson. The album received widespread critical acclaim.

== Background and release ==
In a 2021 interview with radio station KLAQ, frontman Tobias Forge stated that he came up with the concept of Impera in 2013 after reading the book The Rule of Empires: Those Who Built Them, Those Who Endured Them, and Why They Always Fall by Timothy Parsons. He came across the book in an independent bookstore called Left Bank Books, situated in Seattle's Pike Place Market. When asked about that chance discovery, he explained: "I'm interested in history and culture, and how empires are built up, and how and why they always fall apart. Right there and then, I knew that at some point, 'I'm going to make an imperial record.'"

In June 2019, Forge stated that the band would be touring the United States in September and October in support of their fourth album Prequelle before returning to Europe. The band then entered the studio in January 2020 to begin working on their fifth album, and planned to release it by late summer that year. However, Forge stated that they would wait until after the U.S. presidential election to release the album, concerning the event would draw public's attention the most.

In March 2020, during their final show supporting their 2018 album Prequelle in Mexico City, Cardinal Copia, the singer of the band, was transformed into Papa Emeritus IV. He would remain the frontman for their fifth album.

The COVID-19 pandemic delayed the release of the album, and in October 2020, Forge revealed that the album was intended to be released in the winter. It was further delayed, however.

On 30 September 2021, the band released a single, "Hunter's Moon" for the 2021 slasher film Halloween Kills with a different version of the song being played in the closing credits. On 20 January 2022, the band announced their fifth studio album, Impera, was finally set to release on 11 March 2022, and released what would be the second single, "Call Me Little Sunshine", as "Hunter's Moon" will also appear on the album. On 2 March 2022, the band released the next single from the album, "Twenties". On 27 July 2022, the band released a music video for the album's fourth single, "Spillways".

A download of the studio version of the song "Kaisarion" was made available with a preorder of a special edition CD of Impera.

== Recording ==
While it was originally planned for the band to record the album in 2020 and release it in early 2021, the band ended up waiting until January 2021 to enter the studio and record the album. Recording lasted six weeks and mixing/mastering took two to three weeks. The album was produced by Klas Åhlund and mixed by Andy Wallace, who also did the same for the band's 2015 album, Meliora.

== Music and themes ==
Musically, Impera has been described as hard rock, arena rock, glam metal, heavy metal, and pop rock. The album's sound has been described as 1980s-style pop and rock and has been compared to ABBA, Boston, Dio, Bon Jovi, and Def Leppard. The album is themed mainly on "the rise and fall of empires". It is described to take place hundreds of years forward from the 14th-century Europe Black Plague era of Ghost's previous album, Prequelle.

The cover art by Zbigniew Bielak is a reference to a photograph of English occultist Aleister Crowley.

== Promotion ==
In January 2022, the band kicked off a North American co-headline tour with Volbeat called the Imperatour. During the first show in Reno, the band performed "Kaisarion", the second song of the album, for the first time, as well as introduced new gas mask-inspired costumes for the Nameless Ghouls. They also headlined the UK and European legs of the tour that started in April 2022.

The band appeared on U.S. chat show Jimmy Kimmel Live! on 17 March 2022, where they performed the single "Call Me Little Sunshine".

== Commercial performance ==
Impera debuted at number one in five countries, including in the band's native country Sweden, and charted in the top 40 of multiple charts worldwide.

In the United States, Impera debuted at number two on the Billboard 200 chart, behind Lil Durk's 7220, selling 70,000 units in its first week, of which 62,500 were physical album sales. At the time, it was Ghost's highest charting album in the U.S., surpassing Prequelle's position of number three, as well as earning the largest physical album sales week of 2022 in the U.S. It also charted at number 2 in the UK, becoming Ghost's highest charting album there, behind Rex Orange County's Who Cares?

== Reception ==
Professional ratings
Aggregate scores
Source	Rating
AnyDecentMusic?	7.5/10
Metacritic	84/100
Review scores
Source	Rating
AllMusic	4.5/5 stars
Blabbermouth.net	8/10
Classic Rock	3.5/5 stars
Exclaim!	7/10
Kerrang!	4/5
Metal Hammer	4.5/5 stars
Metal Injection	9/10
Metal Sucks	4/5 stars
NME	4/5 stars
PopMatters	8/10

According to the review aggregator Metacritic, Impera received "universal acclaim" based on a weighted average score of 84 out of 100 from eight critic scores.

Thom Jurek of AllMusic was positive towards the album stating, "Impera is the most unabashed exercise in exultant pop/rock sheen Ghost has issued to date; it establishes an exquisite front in their own quest for global rock domination." Dom Lawson of Blabbermouth.net called the album the "most spectacular and hook-filled heavy(ish) metal albums in recent memory." According to Mark Beaumont of Classic Rock, "Ghost swap Medieval demons for modern-day counterparts..." and compared the album to Green Day's American Idiot.

Manus Hopkins of Exclaim! called the album "more thematically interesting and more musically complex album than its predecessor" but was less positive towards the band's departure from themes of devil-worshiping and a more evil image. James Hickie of Kerrang! stated that "Impera is among Ghost's very best and sure to push them even closer to those heavenly heights." According to Dave Everley of Metal Hammer, "Ghost have turned in a modern metal classic with an arena rock heart. It turns out the devil doesn't have all the best tunes. Tobias Forge does."

Jordan Blum of Metal Injection considered the album to be "a tad more accessible and light compared to their first two or three albums—prioritizing welcoming rock over weird metal in most cases—but that's hardly a flaw considering how unified and exciting it is." Metal Sucks compared the album to Avatar and King Diamond and called it "theatrical, catchy, and evil in the most approachable way." James McMahon of NME called the twelve tracks on the album "a truly delicious pop-rock proposition." Adrien Begrand of PopMatters considered the lyrics on the song "Twenties" to be too blunt and bring the song "close to a cartoon level." However, Begrand praised the album's "smart riffs and melodies" and considers the album to be what "establishes them as a commercial hard rock force."

The single "Call Me Little Sunshine" received a nomination for Best Metal Performance at the 65th Annual Grammy Awards, but lost to "Degradation Rules" by Ozzy Osbourne and Tony Iommi.

=== Accolades ===
Accolades for Impera
Publication	List	Rank
Metal Hammer	Top 50 Albums of 2022	1
Revolver	25 Best Albums of 2022	1
AMAs	Favourite Rock Album	–
Kerrang!	The 50 Best Albums of 2022	5
Guitar World	The 10 Best Guitar Solos of 2022 (for "Griftwood")	7
Guitar World	The Best Guitar Albums of 2022	11

== Track listing ==
Impera track listing
No.	Title	Writer(s)	Length
1.	"Imperium"	Tobias Forge	1:40
2.	"Kaisarion"	Forge; Joakim Berg	5:02
3.	"Spillways"	Forge; Salem Al Fakir; Vincent Pontare	3:16
4.	"Call Me Little Sunshine"	Forge; Max Grahn	4:44
5.	"Hunter's Moon"	Forge; Grahn	3:16
6.	"Watcher in the Sky"	Forge; Al Fakir; Pontare	5:48
7.	"Dominion"	Forge; Al Fakir; Pontare	1:22
8.	"Twenties"	Forge; Al Fakir; Pontare	3:46
9.	"Darkness at the Heart of My Love"	Forge; Al Fakir; Pontare	4:58
10.	"Griftwood"	Forge; Peter Svensson; Klas Åhlund	5:16
11.	"Bite of Passage"	Forge	0:31
12.	"Respite on the Spitalfields"	Forge; Berg	6:42
Total length:			46:21

Bandcamp digital edition bonus track
No.	Title	Writer(s)	Length
13.	"Hunter's Moon" (film version)	Forge; Grahn	3:10
Total length:			49:31

== Personnel ==
Credits for Impera adapted from liner notes.

=== Ghost ===
- Papa Emeritus IV – vocals & bass
- A Group of Nameless Ghouls

=== Additional personnel ===
- Fredrik Åkesson – guitars
- Salem Al Fakir – keyboards
- Hux Nettermalm – drums
- Martin Hederos – piano, organ
- Alva Åkesson – choir (8)
- Elvira Nettermalm – choir (8)
- Inez Johansson – choir (8)
- Lita Åhlund – choir (8)
- Minou Forge – choir (8)
- Olivia Boman – choir (8)
- Anna Mosten – choir (9, 12)
- Estherlivia – choir (9, 12)
- Ida Gratte – choir (9, 12)
- Ida Johansson – choir (9, 12)
- Jade Ell – choir (9, 12)
- Johanna Eriksson Sanmark – choir (9, 12)

=== Technical ===
- Klas Åhlund – production
- Andy Wallace – mixing
- Zbigniew Bielak – cover art
- Ted Jensen – mastering

== Charts ==
=== Weekly charts ===
Weekly chart performance for Impera
Chart (2022–2025)	Peak position
Australian Albums (ARIA)	3
Austrian Albums (Ö3 Austria)	1
Belgian Albums (Ultratop Flanders)	2
Belgian Albums (Ultratop Wallonia)	3
Canadian Albums (Billboard)	3
Danish Albums (Hitlisten)	12
Dutch Albums (Album Top 100)	2
Finnish Albums (Suomen virallinen lista)	1
French Albums (SNEP)	5
French Rock & Metal Albums (SNEP)	38
German Albums (Offizielle Top 100)	1
Hungarian Albums (MAHASZ)	8
Irish Albums (Official Charts)	5
Italian Albums (FIMI)	20
New Zealand Albums (RMNZ)	38
Norwegian Albums (VG-lista)	2
Polish Albums (ZPAV)	7
Portuguese Albums (AFP)	12
Scottish Albums (Official Charts)	2
Spanish Albums (Promusicae)	1
Swedish Albums (Sverigetopplistan)	1
Swiss Albums (Schweizer Hitparade)	5
UK Albums (Official Charts)	2
UK Rock & Metal Albums (Official Charts)	1
US Billboard 200	2
US Independent Albums (Billboard)	1
US Top Hard Rock Albums (Billboard)	1
US Top Rock Albums (Billboard)	1

=== Year-end charts ===
Year-end chart performance for Impera
Chart (2022)	Position
Belgian Albums (Ultratop Flanders)	169
German Albums (Offizielle Top 100)	87
Swedish Albums (Sverigetopplistan)	17
US Top Album Sales (Billboard)	58
US Top Current Album Sales (Billboard)	32
US Top Hard Rock Albums (Billboard)	20

== Certifications ==
Certifications for Impera
Region	Certification	Certified units/sales
Poland (ZPAV)	Gold	10,000^{‡}
Sweden (GLF)	Platinum	30,000^{‡}
United Kingdom (BPI)	Silver	60,000^{‡}
^{‡} Sales+streaming figures based on certification alone.

== Release history ==
Release dates and formats for Impera
Region	Date	Format(s)	Label	Ref.
Various	11 March 2022	Cassette; CD; digital download; vinyl; streaming	Loma Vista	
