= Year Zero (song) =

Single by Ghost

from the album Infestissumam
- A-side: "Year Zero"
- B-side: "Orez Raey"
- Released: April 19, 2013
- Recorded: 2012
- Length: 5:11
- Label: Loma Vista
- Songwriters: Martin Persner; Tobias Forge
- Producer: Nick Raskulinecz

Ghost singles chronology
"Secular Haze" (2012)	"Year Zero" (2013)	"Cirice" (2015)

"Year Zero" is a song by the Swedish rock band Ghost. The track was released as the second single from the group's second studio album Infestissumam.

== Background and release ==
Tobias Forge claimed that "Year Zero" and "Zenith" are the only two Ghost songs that he was not the main author of, the two songs instead being the ideas of guitarist Martin Persner. Although, Forge did write the former's lyrics in addition to revising, arranging and giving instrumentation to both.

On March 12, 2013, Ghost began providing fans with a free streaming of "Year Zero" if they promoted the band on Facebook, by endorsing its frontman to be elected the next Pope of the Catholic Church. The 10" vinyl version of the single includes the B-side "Orez Raey", which as the title suggests is the A-side played backward.

The single's cover art is an homage to John Martin's famous engraving, Satan Presiding at the Infernal Council.

== Music video ==
A music video for the song directed by Amir Chamdin was unveiled on March 25, 2013. A censored version was uploaded to YouTube two days later.

== Reception ==
Loudwire referred to "Year Zero" as possibly the standout track of Infestissumam. About the song, Spin wrote that "Satanic-choir hooks flow into comparatively restrained, melodic verses that are somehow even more sinister." Metal Forces called it one of the album's best with its "eerie chants that sound as if they’ve been lifted from the local monastery" and its infectious drum beat.

Loudwire named the "Year Zero" music video the Best Metal Video of 2013, while Revolver named it seventh on their list of the year's best in all genres. "Year Zero" and its music video were nominated for Best Metal Song and Best Metal Video in the 2013 Loudwire Music Awards.

== Track listing ==
No.	Title	Length
1.	"Year Zero"	5:50
2.	"Orez Raey"	5:50

== Personnel ==
- Papa Emeritus II − vocals
- Nameless Ghouls – all instrumentalists: lead guitarist, bassist, keyboardist, drummer, rhythm guitarist
- Mattias Frisk – artwork

== Certifications ==
Certifications for "Year Zero"
Region	Certification	Certified units/sales
Sweden (GLF)	Gold	20,000^{‡}
^{‡} Sales+streaming figures based on certification alone.
