= Elizabeth (Ghost song) =

Single by Ghost

from the album Opus Eponymous
- B-side: "Death Knell"
- Released: June 20, 2010
- Recorded: 2010
- Genre: Doom metal
- Length: 4:01
- Label: Iron Pegasus Records
- Songwriter: Tobias Forge
- Producer: Gene Walker

Ghost singles chronology
"Elizabeth" (2010)	"Secular Haze" (2012)

"Elizabeth" is the debut single by the Swedish rock band Ghost. It was released in 2010 as the lead single from the group's debut studio album Opus Eponymous.

== Background and release ==
The song "Elizabeth" is about Elizabeth Báthory. In 2010, the band produced a three-track demo and the vinyl-only single "Elizabeth", before releasing their first studio album, Opus Eponymous, on October 18, 2010.

== Track listing ==
Side A
No.	Title	Length
1.	"Elizabeth"	3:54

Side B
No.	Title	Length
1.	"Death Knell"	4:35

== Personnel ==
- Papa Emeritus − vocals
- Nameless Ghouls – all instrumentalists: lead guitarist, bassist, keyboardist, drummer, rhythm guitarist
