= Infestissumam =

2013 studio album by Ghost

Studio album by Ghost
- Released: April 10, 2013
- Recorded: 2012
- Studio: Blackbird Studios, Nashville, Tennessee; The Bridge Recording Studios, Glendale, California; Mayfire Studio, Linköping, Sweden; Hufvudstaden, Söderköping, Sweden
- Genre: Heavy metal; doom metal; progressive rock; psychedelic rock; pop rock
- Length: 47:43
- Label: Sonet; Loma Vista
- Producer: Nick Raskulinecz

Ghost chronology
Opus Eponymous (2010)	Infestissumam (2013)	If You Have Ghost (2013)

Singles from Infestissumam
- 1. "Secular Haze" Released: December 15, 2012; 2. "Year Zero" Released: April 19, 2013

Infestissumam (archaic spelling of Latin infestissimam, a feminine superlative meaning "[to the] very / most hostile", in reference to the Antichrist) is the second studio album by the Swedish rock band Ghost. It was recorded in Nashville, Tennessee, produced by Nick Raskulinecz and released on April 10, 2013. It was released in North America by Loma Vista Recordings on April 16 in partnership with Republic Records, a division of Universal Music Group, marking the band's major label debut. The album was generally well-received, with several music publications placing it on their list of the best heavy metal albums of the year, and won the 2014 Grammis Award for Best Hard Rock/Metal Album. In late 2013, the band released a special edition of the album, called Infestissumam Redux.

== Background and recording ==
All of the album's tracks except "Ghuleh" were written and demoed by the end of summer 2011. The band planned to record the album after their North American tour with Enslaved and Alcest; however Ghost had to pull out of the tour and both the band and Rise Above Records agreed the album should be released on a different label. A Nameless Ghoul said that the band was in a hurry to put out another record.

On signing to a major label for the album, a Ghoul said, "It was Tom Whalley who was interested in the band. [He] was looking to start his own label, which ended up being an imprint of Universal ... We felt that we might be self-conscious about making that move, but knowing his background, having someone like that, having him be an advocate for our band, within a big organization like Universal, felt like the closest thing you can get to being on an independent without being on an independent."

Ghost finally began recording the album in October 2012 in Nashville, Tennessee, with producer Nick Raskulinecz. The band said they chose Raskulinecz because "He's good at working with a band without transforming the band into something else, rather than make them just flower as the band they are ... It turned out he didn't want to change much at all, and that's why he got the job." In 2015, a Nameless Ghoul said they were not 100% satisfied with the album's final production, citing time restraints forcing them to accept last minute mixing and mastering. They did have difficulties in the Nashville area; because of their Satanic lyrics the band could not find a choir to perform on their record. Even individual choristers turned down the work. The band said, "Then we told them what they were supposed to sing, and one of the guys almost cried, he took offense; it was really weird ... So we ended up recording the choir in Hollywood, where people have no problem with worshipping the Devil."

== Themes ==
"Year Zero"
Sample of "Year Zero", mentioning Satan in the chorus and the naming of several aliases for the Devil or other demons; "Belial, Behemoth, Beelzebub, Asmodeus, Satanas, Lucifer."

Commenting on the themes of Infestissumam, a Nameless Ghoul told Decibel that while their debut album, Opus Eponymous, ended with the track "Genesis", about the birth of the Antichrist, Infestissumam continues from the Antichrist's birth onwards. In another interview the band said, "Everything on the first record was about a coming darkness, an impending doom. Whereas the new record is about something present, and literally, the new record deals with the presence of the Anti-Christ, the Devil. But subliminally, the meaning of it is more how mankind-- predominantly men-- what they have deemed to be the presence of the Devil, throughout history and even nowadays. And that's why the record is so fueled with sexual themes and females. That's basically it, the Inquisition was basically men accusing women of being the Devil just because they had a hard-on for them."

Explaining why the record is more musically diverse than their first, a member said, "Being applauded for a few of those things on the first record that according to the rule book of metal would be viewed as a lot of no-no's enticed us to go even deeper, and both downwards and upwards, and just overall make a more colorful record", and "A lot of metal bands have a tendency to come up with a sound and they just mimic that 10 times on a record. [...] Which is fine, but we tried to deliberately have every song have its own signature."

The song "Secular Haze" came about when a Ghoul writer came to the rest of the band saying, "This is a new song. There was this carnival remark, and obviously there is a cabaret element in that organ, but the idea was to actually have a maritime feel. It's supposed to feel like you're on a stormy sea, with waves. The idea was musically inspired by a saying, how someone that has been close to dying by drowning said that the feeling that you get is an enormous, cold, anxiety feeling which is replaced just before you die with a warm acceptance that is supposedly extremely rewarding and orgasmic. The whole song is supposed to feel like it's storming and storming, never ending with a few glimpses of tranquility in the choruses, but where in the end, in the “come mist eternal part”, it's supposed to feel like you've gone over the edge of freezing to that warmth."

"Ghuleh / Zombie Queen" originated from an old piece of music: "The piano part in the beginning is old. It's been lying around for years. But in a Ghost context it needed to become something else, there wasn't a full idea that would sort of materialize, it would have kept the same line throughout the whole song. This record needed an ending to the A-side, after the three first songs, which are all hectic and involve a lot of changes and hysteria, you needed a sort of meadow where you could lie for a little while. That's why we took on that song and transferred it into what turned into 'Ghuleh / Zombie Queen'. Even though it might not be the best song on the record, which I have a hard time deciding which is, it's definitely one of the most interesting parts of the record. It's a good move that we're getting away with. [laughs]" In another interview, a Ghoul said "there are elements of 'Ghuleh' that are very typical of '70s Swedish music." When asked what is "Ghuleh", a Ghoul replied "She is the romanticized idea of either a being or a time being lost. It is about nostalgia. The absence of time or a person or a being or something has a tendency to fog up the idea of what the actual nature of that thing or person is."

Tobias Forge claimed that "Year Zero" and "Zenith" are the only two Ghost songs that he was not the main author of, the two instead being the ideas of guitarist Martin Persner. However, Forge did write the former's lyrics in addition to revising, arranging and giving instrumentation to both.

== Artwork ==
The image that U.S. CD manufacturers refused to print on the disc of the deluxe edition

The album's cover art is part of a single, large piece that was separated into 12 or 13 pictures. These were used as thumbnails for the videos of songs from the album on Ghost's YouTube channel. It was made in collaboration with the band, drawn by Polish artist Zbigniew Bielak, and inspired by the album's lyrics and themes. A Nameless Ghoul said that because the album deals with the Antichrist "we knew there was going to be a baby on the front cover. It also represents the paradox of inborn evil, of being very innocent and very vulnerable", and said that it is a pastiche of the film Amadeus.

Infestissumam was originally scheduled for release on April 9; however, the band could not find a manufacturer for the CD in the U.S., delaying its release until April 16. A source close to the band told Spin that Ghost was turned down by four U.S. CD manufacturers because of artwork of the album's deluxe edition, which is a 16th-century illustration of an orgy. The magazine said it was the depiction of Jesus Christ crucified upside down that caused the controversy instead of the Gustave Doré-inspired work's sexual content. However, a Nameless Ghoul said it was indeed because of the sexual content and said it was ironic that "just because we had naked women as well as female body parts shown and exposed, that caused the problem. What about the blasphemy? What about the Satanism? That wasn't the problem. That's exactly what the record is about." Rather than delay the album longer, the band decided to use the CD artwork from the regular edition for the U.S. pressings on the deluxe edition CD. All European copies and the U.S. vinyl version include the controversial artwork as "Vinyl manufacturers don't have a problem with the artwork. Neither does Europe."

== Promotion ==
On December 14, 2012, the website SecularHaze.com was created by Ghost. The website contained a sound clip of a new Ghost song without vocals. On the page was a clock ticking backwards and five candles, each playing one element of the new song when the user hovered over it with the mouse. The next day, the band uploaded a new song to their official YouTube channel, also called "Secular Haze". Later that day, they performed a special concert in their hometown of Linköping, Sweden, performing the entire Opus Eponymous record along with "Secular Haze" and their cover of "I'm a Marionette". Before "Secular Haze" was performed, Papa Emeritus, the band's vocalist, disappeared into the black of the stage to be replaced by Papa Emeritus II. After this concert, SecularHaze.com was updated to include a sixth candle containing the vocal track of the song "Secular Haze". Four days later, the band announced the title of their second album, Infestissumam, along with the webpage Infestissumam.com which showed the album's track list.

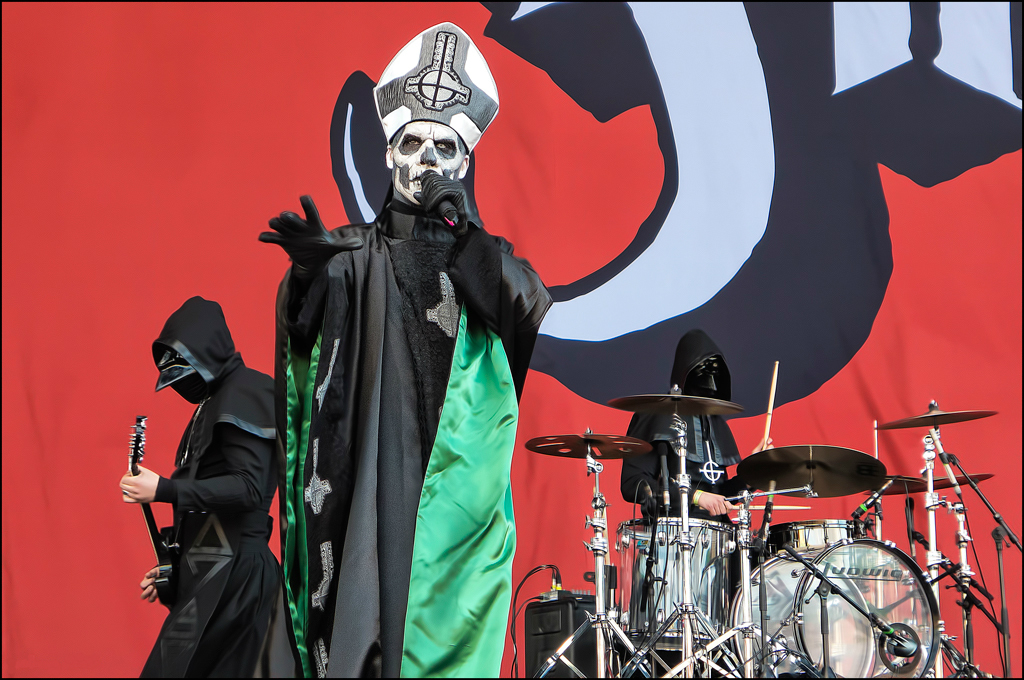
Ghost performing in Spain at the Sonisphere Festival, 2013

"Secular Haze" was the album's first single, given as a free digital download to fans signing up to the band's mailing list from December 15, 2012. A limited pressing of 10" vinyl records of the single was later released. On choosing "Secular Haze" as the first single, a Ghoul said "we wanted to present a song from the new record that sort of stood on its own but without being too far off from the first record". The single's B-side was the cover of ABBA's "I'm a Marionette", which features Dave Grohl of Nirvana and Foo Fighters on drums as well as production. The collaboration happened when, before going to Nashville to record the album, Ghost had a bunch of covers demoed and were discussing if they should squeeze them onto the album. "... we were at a festival in Europe and Foo Fighters was playing, and we knew that Dave was a fan, and [when we talked to him] after a few handshakes and a few laughs, we were like 'Okay, so you liked the band? So do you want to do something?' And he said yeah, and one month later we were in [his studio in] L.A. doing that." The band recorded their first music video for "Secular Haze" in Linköping, with director Amir Chamdin.

On March 12, 2013, Ghost began providing fans with a free streaming of "Year Zero" if they promoted the band on Facebook, by endorsing its frontman to be elected the next Pope of the Catholic Church. The vinyl version of the single includes the B-side "Orez Raey", which is the A-side played backwards. A music video for the song, again directed by Amir Chamdin, was unveiled on March 25. Loudwire named it the Best Metal Video of 2013, while Revolver named it seventh on their list of the year's best in all genres.

The song "Monstrance Clock" was offered for free streaming on April 8. The following day, the entire Infestissumam album was uploaded for streaming. While including the songs "La Mantra Mori" and "I'm a Marionette" from the deluxe edition, the Japanese version of the album also features a cover of Depeche Mode's "Waiting for the Night". A third music video, for "Monstrance Clock", was released on July 3, 2013. It was directed by Rob Semmer, filmed at Ghost's shows at the El Rey Theatre and Webster Hall, and opens with footage of fans praising the band in a mock-confessional. In late 2013, Ghost released a special edition of the album, called Infestissumam Redux. It includes "La Mantra Mori" and the entirety of the If You Have Ghost EP, which featured further collaborations with Grohl.

== Reception ==
=== Critical reception ===
Professional ratings
Aggregate scores
Source	Rating
Metacritic	67/100
Review scores
Source	Rating
AllMusic	3.5/5 stars
Consequence of Sound	D
Exclaim!	7/10
The Guardian	4/5 stars
Loudwire	5/5 stars
Metal Hammer	4/5 stars
MetalSucks	4/5 stars
Rolling Stone	3/5 stars
Pitchfork	5.8/10
PopMatters	6/10

Infestissumam received generally positive reviews from music critics. At Metacritic, which assigns a normalized rating out of 100 to reviews from mainstream critics, the album received an average score of 67, which indicates "generally favorable reviews," based on 11 reviews. James Christopher Monger of AllMusic described the psychedelic and progressive departures from the band's debut as "weirdly effective" and called the album "a hell of a lot of fun." The Village Voice and Entertainment Weekly named Infestissumam the best metal album of 2013, while Loudwire ranked it second on their list. The album was listed by Noisecreep as one of the Best Vinyl Releases of 2013. Both "Secular Haze" and "Year Zero" were named among the Best Metal Songs of 2013 by Loudwire. Infestissumam won the 2014 Grammis Award for Best Hard Rock/Metal Album. It also won the similar P3 Guld award for Best Rock/Metal Album of the Year.

In a less positive review, Jon Hadusek of Consequence of Sound described the album as "pretty tame" and said that "for a band whose songs rely on falsetto and choruses, the absence of memorable melodies on Infestissumam is an eternal sin." In Decibel magazine, Jeff Treppel wrote that Ghost seem to be consciously avoiding a sophomore slump by "throwing together the most eclectic set of songs they could conjure from the pit", and that this "wildly inconsistent ride ... bodes well for the band's longevity."

=== Sales ===
Infestissumam debuted at number one on Sweden's Sverigetopplistan chart, selling nearly five times as many copies as the number two album, Wolves by Miss Li. The album was certified gold by the International Federation of the Phonographic Industry in October 2014, for sales of 20,000. Infestissumam Redux reached number 8 on the Sverigetopplistan. In the United States, Infestissumam sold an estimated 14,000 copies in its first week and debuted at number 28 on the Billboard 200 chart. Blabbermouth.net reported that the album had sold nearly 70,000 copies in the US by November 2015.

== Track listing ==
All original songs credited to "A Ghoul Writer" in the booklet. Actual writing credits adapted from ASCAP.

No.	Title	Writer(s)	Length
1.	"Infestissumam"	Tobias Forge^{*}	1:42
2.	"Per Aspera ad Inferi"	Forge	4:09
3.	"Secular Haze"	Forge	5:11
4.	"Jigolo Har Megiddo"	Forge	3:58
5.	"Ghuleh / Zombie Queen"	Forge	7:29
6.	"Year Zero"	Forge; Martin Persner^{*}	5:50
7.	"Body and Blood"	Forge; Persner	3:43
8.	"Idolatrine"	Forge	4:23
9.	"Depth of Satan's Eyes"	Forge	5:25
10.	"Monstrance Clock"	Forge; Persner	5:53
Total length:			47:43

Deluxe edition
No.	Title	Writer(s)	Length
11.	"La Mantra Mori"	Forge	5:14
12.	"I'm a Marionette" (ABBA cover)	Benny Andersson; Björn Ulvaeus	4:52
13.	"Secular Haze" (music video, digital deluxe edition only)	Forge	5:19
Total length:			62:31

Japanese edition
No.	Title	Writer(s)	Length
11.	"La Mantra Mori"	Forge	5:14
12.	"I'm a Marionette" (ABBA cover)	Andersson; Ulvaeus	4:52
13.	"Waiting for the Night" (Depeche Mode cover)	Martin L. Gore	5:36
Total length:			62:49

Infestissumam Redux
No.	Title	Writer(s)	Length
11.	"La Mantra Mori"	Forge	5:14
12.	"If You Have Ghosts" (Roky Erickson cover)	Roky Erickson	3:34
13.	"I'm a Marionette" (ABBA cover)	Andersson; Ulvaeus	4:52
14.	"Crucified" (Army of Lovers cover)	Alexander Bard; Anders Wollbeck; Jean-Pierre Barda	5:13
15.	"Waiting for the Night" (Depeche Mode cover)	Gore	5:37
16.	"Secular Haze" (live)	Forge	5:27
Total length:			77:47

^{*} Band members also used aliases for their actual writing credits: Forge is credited as "A Ghoul Writer", and Persner as "Indio Marcato".

=== Infestissumam ===
The album's title track, "Infestissumam", starts with a Gregorian chant and then morphs into a polyphonic melody. It is followed by an electric guitar riff and drums before transitioning to the next song.

=== Per Aspera ad Inferi ===
The second track is named, ungrammatically in Latin, "Per Aspera ad Inferi" (meaning "through difficulties, to hell" and alluding to the Latin motto per aspera ad astra).

=== Jigolo Har Megiddo ===
The fourth track, "Jigolo Har Megiddo" ("Gigolo of Meggido"), embodies the two central themes of the album: sexual desire and the Antichrist. Gigolo means male prostitute, and Har Migido is the Hebrew name for the Biblical location where the final battle against Satan would occur. According to Academic Jarell Paulissen, the main theme of the track is brought up in the second verse:

I am the son of one below, the progeny of beast of woe
And I am the son who comes into the daughters of men
Destroying all and make them want it again

In his words, this verse conveys the idea that the Antichrist would be attempting to destroy the world by tempting people to give in to their carnal passions. This verse also references the biblical giants who were born from the "sons of God" who "came in unto the daughters of men", as written in the book of Genesis. The same song also references the Gospel of John with the phrase "I am the way", which was said by Jesus in the same book.

=== Year Zero ===
"Year Zero" is the sixth track of the album. It starts with a Gregorian chanting of names taken from the Old Testament which later became, associated with Satan. According to Paulissen, the lyrics of the song are themed after the futility of life and the coming of Satan. In the bridge, the song alludes to biblical descriptions of Lucifer pertaining to the Book of Isaiah.

== Personnel ==
=== Ghost ===
- Papa Emeritus II
- A Group of Nameless Ghouls

=== Guests ===
- St. Trident Tenors of Tinseltown – backing vocals
- Dave Grohl – drums, percussion and production on "I'm a Marionette" and "Waiting for the Night"
- Derek Silverman – organ on "Waiting for the Night"

=== Additional personnel ===
- Nick Raskulinecz – production
- David Richard Campbell – scoring and conducting
- Paul Fig, Nathan Yarborough, Ted Jensen, Simon Söderberg, Niels Nielsen, Niklas Berglöf – engineering
- Bp. Necropolitus Cracovienses Zbigniew Bielak II – artwork

== Charts ==
Chart (2013)	Peak position
Australian Albums (ARIA)	62
Finnish Albums (Suomen virallinen lista)	5
Greek Albums (IFPI Greece)	22
Norwegian Albums (VG-lista)	8
Swedish Albums Chart (Sverigetopplistan)	1
UK Albums Chart (OCC)	35
US Billboard 200	28
US Top Hard Rock Albums (Billboard)	1
US Top Rock Albums (Billboard)	10

== Certifications ==
Region	Certification	Certified units/sales
Sweden (GLF)	Gold	20,000^{‡}
^{‡} Sales+streaming figures based on certification alone.
