= Amir Chamdin =

Swedish director and rapper

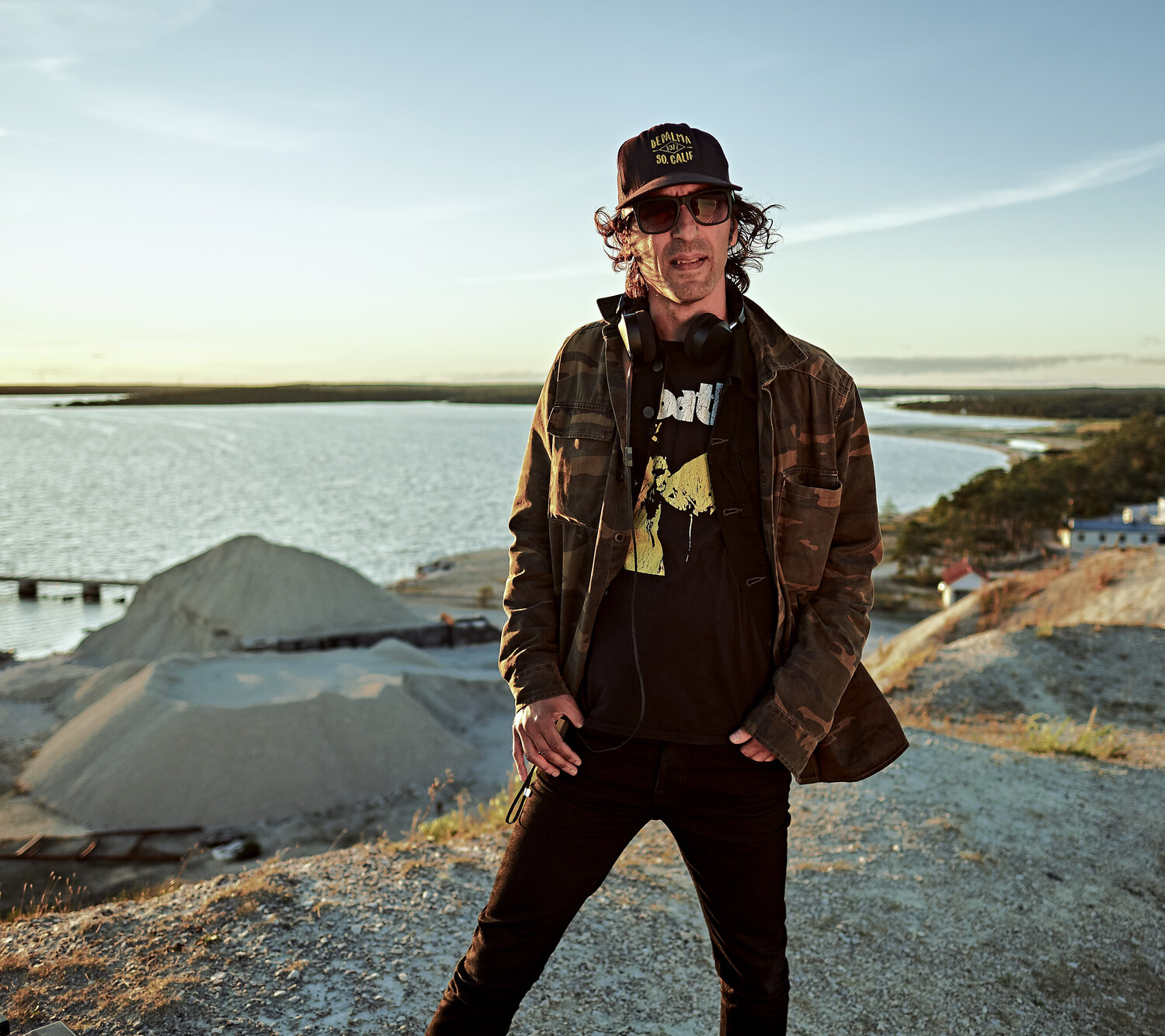
Amir Chamdin

Amir Juan Chamdin (born 4 June 1974) is a Swedish director and musician renowned for his work in music videos, feature films, and TV series.

Chamdin first made a name for himself as the front figure of the Swedish hip hop band Infinite Mass. After starting his career on stage performing with the band, he later achieved recognition when he turned into a director. Highlights include MTV Best Video winner “You're the Storm” for The Cardigans, the feature film sensation Cornelis—about one of Sweden's greatest music legends- and the crime-thriller Hassel, which reached number 1 as the most-watched new series in Sweden and Finland in 2017.

In 2020, Chamdin received the award for 'Best Series' at CANNESSERIES for his original TV series, "Partisan", which premiered on Viaplay in August the same year. Partisan set a record for the most-viewed Viaplay original show on its premiere night.

His diverse directorial portfolio includes notable works such as the ballet Gustavia, the music video Satanized, and television series like Partisan and Börje – The Journey of a Legend.

== Biography ==
Amir Juan Chamdin was born in Huddinge, Sweden, to a Syrian father and a Finnish mother from Kiikoinen, Finland. He was raised in Södermalm, Stockholm. Chamdin is a front figure in the groundbreaking Swedish hip hop group Infinite Mass since their formation in 1991. Directing and creating the visual world of the band gave him acknowledgment and a stepping-stone to becoming a full-time director. Working closely with other bands like The Hellacopters, Ghost (Swedish band)|Ghost and The Cardigans was a natural fit and the innovative film school he never had.

In 2001, Infinite Mass released their third studio album, “The Face,” on Polar/Universal. The album was a major success, and its first single, ”Bullet” featuring Roger Daltrey, became an instant hit and gold record. Chamdin also had the lead role in “The Artist,” a short film made in New York.

In 2002, Chamdin became the third director of RAF (Renck Åkerlund Films). Working alongside his long-time friends and accomplished brethren Jonas Åkerlund and Johan Renck.

It was 2004 when Chamdin received MTV's coveted Best Music Video Award for The Cardigans’ “You're The Storm.” 2004 was also the year when Infinite Mass dropped their 4th studio album 1991 gaining the title; most played band/artist on Swedish radio in 2004 ahead of Outcast and Scissor Sisters. It was also now that Amir & Dregen from Backyard Babies formed Snowracer, a progressive electronic band together with Martin ”Nåid” Landquist and Brady Blade. The debut album was released in 2005 with Universal and featured guest artists such as Emmylou Harris.

In 2005, he founded the production company Chamdin & Stöhr with producers Martina Stöhr Torell and Daniel Sachs. Together, they have produced several international award-winning commercials for clients such as H&M, IKEA, Adidas, and The Andy Warhol Exhibition. Chamdin decided to act again, playing Heberson Da Costa in the TV series Lasermannen (The Laser Man).

In 2006, Chamdins made his cinematic debut as a director. The black & white feature film was God Willing (2006 film)|God Willing, starring himself and Nina Persson.^{[4]} Variety wrote of the film: “God Willing looks like no other Swedish film of recent years. This melancholy love story is about two would-be lovers during a moment in 1975.″ The film received the Kodak Visionary Award in 2006 and was nominated in several international film festivals.

2006 Chamdin won a Silver Egg for his black & white short film Banana Party, shot by Hoyte van Hoytema and premiered on MTV.

In 2009, Chamdin released the self-titled debut album Mean Streets through Warner. It was written and performed by Chamdin and Nicke Andersson.

In 2010, Chamdin's second feature, Cornelis, premiered and starred Hank von Hell, the famous lead singer from the death-punk band Turbonegro. Cornelis went straight to No. 1 at the box office in Sweden and Norway. H&M approached Amir to create a cohesive visual forum on television and for the in-store/outdoor screens. This became a massive campaign with over 100 commercials with stars such as: Bryan Ferry, Daria Werbowy, Lou Dillon, Freja Beha amongst others. The music was performed by Erykah Badu, covering Muddy Waters's ”Mannish Boy”.

In 2013, Loudwire named Ghost and the "Year Zero" music video directed by Chamdin, the Best Metal Video of 2013,[7] while Revolver named it seventh on their list of the year's best in all genres. "Year Zero" and its music video were nominated for Best Metal Song and Best Metal Video in the 2013 Loudwire Music Awards. 2013 was also the year when Chamdin directed Gisele Bündchen in a music video, covering The Kinks "All Day and All of the Night", filmed on the streets of London.

In 2014, Chamdin made a short film with Gösta Ekman for a campaign for Höj Rösten (Raise The Voice), calling on people to vote.

Harper's Bazaar wrote, "Four of the world's top models have been given the James Bond treatment for H&M's new 2015 swimwear campaign, which makes a nice change from the standard rolling-around-on-beach variety.” Adriana Lima, Doutzen Kroes, Joan Smalls, and Natasha Poly star in the Chamdin-directed film with music by Axwell & Ingrosso. In 2015, Chamdin directed a black & white commercial for Mango featuring music from The Kills, starring Jamie Hince and Karlie Kloss.

In 2017, Chamdin directed his first original TV series, Hassel, a realistic, hard-boiled police thriller series inspired by the iconic detective Roland Hassel starring Ola Rapace. Chamdin was brought in as a conceptual director for the 10-episode drama, creating the visual world and bringing new life to the Scandinavian noir genre. Hassel is distributed in Scandinavia by streaming giant Viaplay and produced by Nice Drama.

Chamdin created and directed the television series Partisan, which premiered on Viaplay in August 2020. The series, starring Fares Fares, is set in the idyllic yet mysterious community of Jordnära and delves into themes of secrecy and control. Partisan received the 'Best Series' award at CANNESSERIES and set a record for the most-viewed Viaplay original show on its premiere night.

Chamdin directed Börje —The Journey of a Legend, a biographical series about Swedish ice hockey player Börje Salming that premiered in 2023. In an interview with Us Weekly, Actor Jason Priestley, who portrayed talent scout Gerry McNamara in the series, discussed his physical transformation for the role and his collaboration with Chamdin.

In 2024, Chamdin wrote and directed Gustavia, a ballet that premiered at the Royal Swedish Opera on October 18. The production narrates the life of Gustav Badin, an enslaved child brought to the Swedish royal court in the 1750s who became a notable figure in Swedish history. Choreographed by Pär Isberg and featuring costumes by designer Selam Fessahaye, the ballet received critical acclaim for its compelling storytelling and innovative production.

Chamdin directed the music video for "Satanized," which garnered significant attention upon its release in 2025. The video was praised for its bold visuals and thematic depth.

== Films ==
- 2006 Chamdin made his cinematic debut with the film God Willing (Om gud Vill), which starred Nina Persson from The Cardigans and Amir himself. Jack White (The White Stripes) permitted Chamdin to record a new version of the song "Dead Leaves and the Dirty Ground" when seeing the film. This later became the theme song of the movie. The film also received the Kodak Visionary Award in 2006. It was nominated in several international film festivals such as the Chicago International Film Festival, Taipei International Film Festival, Manila International Film Festival, Guldbaggen, etc.
- 2008 Chamdin directed a short film for The Andy Warhol Exhibition / Moderna museet. Chamdin wrote and directed Kim Bodnia in "Musical Chairs" (Hela Havet Stormar), which premiered in Göteborg International Film Festival 2009.
- The 2010 Chamdin feature film Cornelis premiered in Sweden and Norway. Cornelis is a unique chronicle about one of Sweden's greatest music legends, Cornelis Vreeswijk. Chamdin made an unexpected move by casting Hank Von Hell (Turbonegro) as Cornelis. Cornelis went straight to no. 1 at the box office in Sweden, and it has been very well received throughout the Nordic countries.
- In 2017, Chamdins' first TV series, Hassel, premiered on Viaplay, starring Ola Rapace. Hassel is a realistic, hard-boiled, and direct police thriller series inspired by the iconic detective Roland Hassel. Nicke Andersson (The Hellacopters) made the soundtrack, and the title song is Roky Erickson's "It's a Cold Night For Alligators." Hassel reached number 1 as the most watched new series in Sweden and Finland 2017.
- 2020 Chamdin created and directed 'Partisan', a five-episode crime drama that premiered on Viaplay starring Fares Fares and Johan Rheborg. The series is set in the idyllic surroundings of Jordnära, a gated community that runs a very successful organic farm. We follow a man who takes a job offer, soon learning about their unorthodox rules and routines. The series' soundtrack is the iconic The Partisan by Leonard Cohen.

== Awards ==
- MTV Award Best Music Video - The Cardigans - "You're The Storm"
- Kodak Visionary Award for ”God Willing” 2006
- Loudwire Music Awards - Best Metal Video - Ghost ”Year Zero”
- Epica/Gold – IKEA “comeintomycloset”
- Euro best/Gold – IKEA “comeintomycloset”
- NY Festival Innovative/Gold – Best use of music/sound – IKEA“comeintomycloset”
- NY Festival Innovative/Gold – Household appliances/furnishings –IKEA“comeintomycloset”
- SilverÄgg – Banana Party (MTV Short film)
- Epica/Silver – Nellonen “Ugly Betty”
- London International Awards – Television/Cinema: Campaign TELE2 “Big Bills Are History”
- Grammis Award Modern Dance: Infinite Mass "The Infinite Patio"
- Swedish Dance Music Award / Best Dance Track: ”Area Turns Red” Infinite Mass
- Swedish Dance Music Award Best Album: ”The Infinite Patio” Infinite Mass
- Swedish Dance Music Award Best Hip Hop Artist: Infinite Mass
- 'Best Series' at CANNESSERIES - 'Partisan' (TV-series)

== Filmography ==
Year	Title	Note	Awards
2000	Infinite Mass "Enter The Dragon ”	Music Video	
2000	The Hellacopters ”Hopeless Case of a Kid in Denial”	Music Video	
2000	The Hellacopters ”No Song Unheard”	Music Video	
2001	Infinite Mass featuring Roger Daltrey "Bullet"	Music Video	
2002	The Hellacopters ”By The Grace of God”	Music Video	
2002	Infinite Mass "Blazin"	Music Video	
2002	The Ark ”Calleth you, Cometh I”	Music Video	
2002	The Ark ”Father of A Son”	Music Video	
2002	The Ark ”Tell Me This Night is Over”	Music Video	
2003	The Cardigans ”For What it's Worth”	Music Video	
2004	The Cardigan - You're the Storm	Music Video	MTV - Best Music Video
2004	Gluecifer ”A Call From The Other Side”	Music Video	
2004	Infinite Mass ”No. 1 Swartskalle”	Music Video	
2004	Mando Diao ”Clean Town”	Music Video	
2004	”A Man's Gotta Do”	Short Film	
2005	The Hellacopters ”Everything's On TV”	Music Video	
2005	The Hellacopters ”Bring It On Home”	Music Video	
2005	Adidas "Indoor"	TV Commercial	
2006	God Willing	Feature Film	Kodak Visionary Awards
2006	JC ft Carmen Electra - ”Anniversary”	TV Commercial	
2006	"Banana Party"	Short Film	Winner - Silver Egg
2007	The Hellacopters ”Same Lame Story”	Music Video	
2007	The Hellacopters ”Sign Of The Octopus”	Music Video	
2007	The Hellacopters ”Darling Darling”	Music Video	
2008	The Andy Warhol Exhibition	Commercial	
2009	A Camp ”Stronger Than Jesus”	Music Video	
2009	"Musical Chairs" (Hela Havet Stormar) Starring Kim Bodnia, Lia Boysen, Vera Vitali	Short Film	
2010	Cornelis	Feature Film	
2011	H&M "Winter" ft Bryan Ferry	TV Commercial	
2012	Agnes "One Last Time”	Music Video	
2013	Ghost - Year Zero	Music Video	Loudwire Music Awards - Best Metal Video
2013	Ghost ”Secular Haze”	Music Video	
2013	H&M ft Gisele Bündchen	TV Commercial	
2013	H&M "High Summer" ft Doutzen Kroes	TV Commercial	
2013	Mike Granditsky "Black Out"	Music Video	
2014	NoNoNo ”Jungle”	Music Video	
2014	”Höj Rösten!” ft Gösta Ekman	Short Film	
2015	H&M "Summer Starts Now!" ft Adriana Lima, Doutzen Kroes, Natasha Poly and Joan Smalls	TV Commercial	
2015	H&M "Spring Fashion" ft Daria Werbowy	TV Commercial	
2016	Mike Granditsky ”Speed Street”	Music Video	
2016	H&M "Forever Summer" ft Anna Ewers & Andreea Diaconu	TV Commercial	
2016	Mango "The New Metallic" ft Jamie Hince Starring Karlie Kloss	TV Commercial	
2017	TUI "TUI For You"	TV Commercial	
2017	Hassel	TV series/Viaplay	
2020	Partisan	TV series	Best Series - CANNESSERIES
2022	Ghost ”Spillways”	Music Video	
2023	Börje - The Journey of a Legend	TV series/Viaplay	
2024	Gustavia	Ballet/Swedish Royal Opera	
2025	Ghost "Satanized"	Music Video	
2025	Ghost "Lachryma"	Music Video	
2025	Ghost "Peacefield"	Music Video	
2026	Ghost "Umbra"	Music Video	

== Discography ==
Albums

"Infinite Mass” EP (1993) Infinite Mass Records

”The Infinite Patio” Infinite Mass (1995) Roof Top

”Ride” EP Infinite Mass (1995) Roof Top

”Alwayz Somethang” Infinite Mass (1997) Warlock Records

”Live in Sweden” Infinite Mass (1998) Murlyn

”Bullet” EP Infinite Mass (2001) Polar / Universal

”The Face” Infinite Mass (2001)Polar / Universal

”1991” Infinite Mass (2004) Warner

”Ta-Da-Da-Da” Snowracer (2005) Universal

”Masters Of The Universe” Infinite Mass (2007) Infinite Mass Records

”Mean Streets” Mean Streets (2009) Sheriff / Warner

Soundtracks

”Shoot the Racist” Infinite Mass Soundtrack / Sökarna (1993) Polygram

”Meter Running” Amir Chamdin Soundtrack / Upp Till Kamp (2007) Razzia Records

”Lady Luck” Amir Chamdin Soundtrack / Leo (2007) Memfis Film

Singles

”Mah Boyz” Infinite Mass (1995) Roof Top / BMG

”Nine 5 Vibe” Infinite Mass (1995) Roof Top / BMG

”Area Turns Red” Infinite Mass (1995) Roof Top / BMG

”Ride” Infinite Mass (1996) Roof Top / BMG

”Caught Up In Da Game” Infinite Mass (1997) Warlock Records

”Fo' Sho” Infinite Mass (1997) Warlock Records

”Massacre” Infinite Mass (1997) Warlock Records

”Babylon” Backyard Babies & Ginger (1999) Coalition Records

”Enter The Dragon” Infinite Mass (2000) Warner

”Bullet” Infinite Mass Featuring Roger Daltrey (2001) Polar / Universal

”She's A Freak” Infinite Mass Featuring Linda Sundblad (2001) Polar / Universal

”Blazin’” Infinite Mass (2002) Polar / Universal

”Celebrate” Infinite Mass (2002) Polar / Universal

”No 1. Swartskalle” Infinite Mass (2004) Warner

”The Thief” Infinite Mass (2004) Warner

”Fire Fire” Infinite Mass (2004) Warner

”Native American” Snowracer (2005) Universal

”The Way I'm watching You” Snowracer featuring Emmylou Harris (2005) Universal
