= If You Have Ghost =

EP by Ghost
- Released: 20 November 2013
- Recorded: 2012–2013
- Studio: Studio 606 (Northridge)
- Length: 24:43
- Label: Republic; Loma Vista
- Producer: Dave Grohl

Ghost chronology
Infestissumam (2013)	If You Have Ghost (2013)	Meliora (2015)

If You Have Ghost is the first EP by the Swedish rock band Ghost. It was produced by Dave Grohl and released on 20 November 2013 by Republic Records. Four of the five tracks are covers of other acts; "I'm a Marionette" and "Waiting for the Night" were originally released on various editions of Ghost's second album, Infestissumam, while the two others were newly recorded. The titular track is a cover of If You Have Ghosts from the 1981 album The Evil One, written by Roky Erickson during his incarceration in a Rusk State sanatorium. The fifth is a live recording of Ghost's own "Secular Haze" from the band's performance of 28 July 2013 at Music Hall of Williamsburg in New York City.

== Background ==
Ghost's collaboration with Dave Grohl of Nirvana and Foo Fighters happened when, before going to Nashville to record Infestissumam, the band had a bunch of covers demoed and were discussing if they should squeeze them onto the album. " ... we were at a festival in Europe and Foo Fighters was playing, and we knew that Dave was a fan, and [when we talked to him] after a few handshakes and a few laughs, we were like 'Okay, so you liked the band? So do you want to do something?' And he said yeah, and one month later we were in [his studio in] L.A. doing that".

The cover of "I'm a Marionette" was first released in late 2012 as the B-side to Ghost's "Secular Haze" single. In late 2013, all of the tracks from If You Have Ghost were included in a special edition of Infestissumam, called Infestissumam Redux.

The EP's cover art references a shot from the 1922 German Expressionist horror film Nosferatu.

== Reception ==
Professional ratings
Aggregate scores
Source	Rating
Metacritic	57/100
Review scores
Source	Rating
About.com	4/5 stars
AllMusic	3/5 stars
Consequence of Sound	3/5 stars
Iowa State Daily	(4/5)
Loudwire	4/5 stars
Now	2/4
Rock Sound	(4/10)
Rolling Stone	3/5 stars

At Metacritic, which assigns a normalized rating out of 100 to reviews from mainstream critics, the EP received an average score of 57, which indicates "mixed or average reviews", based on seven reviews. A member of Ghost revealed that Benny Andersson and/or Björn Ulvaeus from ABBA have heard their cover of "I'm a Marionette" and "loved it!"

If You Have Ghost sold roughly 5,000 copies in the United States in its first week and reached No. 87 on the Billboard 200.

== Track listing ==
No.	Title	Writer(s)	Length
1.	"If You Have Ghosts" (Roky Erickson and the Aliens cover)	Roky Erickson	3:34
2.	"I'm a Marionette" (ABBA cover)	Benny Andersson; Björn Ulvaeus	4:52
3.	"Crucified" (Army of Lovers cover)	Alexander Bard; Anders Wollbeck; Jean-Pierre Barda	5:13
4.	"Waiting for the Night" (Depeche Mode cover)	Martin Gore	5:37
5.	"Secular Haze" (recorded live at Music Hall of Williamsburg)	A Ghoul Writer	5:27
Total length:			24:43

== Personnel ==
=== Ghost ===
- Papa Emeritus II
- A Group of Nameless Ghouls

=== Guests ===
- Dave Grohl – production, rhythm guitar on "If You Have Ghosts", drums and percussion on "I'm a Marionette" and "Waiting for the Night"
- Derek Silverman – organ on "If You Have Ghosts" and "Waiting for the Night", piano on "Crucified"
- Jessy Greene – violin and cello on "If You Have Ghosts"

=== Additional personnel ===
- James Brown – recording, mixing on "Waiting for the Night"
- John Lousteau – assistant engineering
- Rich Costy – mixing
- Jeff Curtain – recording and mixing on "Secular Haze (Live)"
- Ted Jensen – mastering
- Mattias Frisk – graphic design

== Charts ==
Chart (2013)	Peak position
UK Albums Chart (OCC)	172
UK Rock & Metal Albums (OCC)	11
US Billboard 200	87
US Top Hard Rock Albums (Billboard)	7
US Top Rock Albums (Billboard)	24
