= Hunter's Moon (song) =

Single by Ghost

from the album Impera
- B-side: "Halloween Kills"
- Released: 30 September 2021
- Genre: Heavy metal; progressive rock
- Length: 3:17; 3:10 (film version)
- Label: Loma Vista
- Songwriters: Tobias Forge; Max Grahn
- Producers: Klas Åhlund (main version); Rob Cavallo (film version); Tom Dalgety (film version)

Ghost singles chronology
"Kiss the Go-Goat / Mary on a Cross" (2019)	"Hunter's Moon" (2021)	"Call Me Little Sunshine" (2022)

Music video
- "Hunter's Moon" on YouTube

Alternate / End Credits music video
- "Hunter's Moon" on YouTube

"Hunter's Moon" is a song by the Swedish rock band Ghost. It was released on 30 September 2021 in support of the 2021 slasher film Halloween Kills; although it does not feature on the film's soundtrack, it plays over the end credits. A music video for the song was released the same day. On 20 January 2022, the band announced that the song was confirmed to be featured on their fifth studio album, Impera, which was released on 11 March 2022.

Two versions of the song were recorded. The main version, released as a single on 30 September 2021, was produced by Klas Åhlund and mixed by Andy Wallace, while the film version featured in the end credits of Halloween Kills was produced by Rob Cavallo and Tom Dalgety and mixed by Doug McKean.

A 7" vinyl record containing the song and "Halloween Kills Main Title" was released alongside a limited edition orange 7" vinyl record on 21 January 2022. The latter release had both versions of "Hunter's Moon".

== Background ==
According to Tobias Forge, Ryan Turek, a producer of the film Halloween Kills, asked him if he was interested in writing a song for the film. Forge said that he already had a few songs that might work, and specifically one song that could work very well within the concepts of the film.

== Track listing ==
=== 7" single ===
No.	Title	Length
1.	"Hunter's Moon"	3:17
2.	"Halloween Kills (Main Title)"	1:46

=== 7" single (Halloween Kills orange vinyl) ===
No.	Title	Length
1.	"Hunter's Moon"	3:16
2.	"Hunter's Moon (Film Version)"	3:10

== Personnel ==
=== Ghost ===
- Papa Emeritus IV
- A Group of Nameless Ghouls

=== Additional personnel ===
- Fredrik Åkesson – guitar
- Hux Nettermalm – drums
- Martin Hederos – piano, organ

=== Production ===
- Klas Åhlund – producer (single version)
- Rob Cavallo – producer (movie version)
- Tom Dalgety – producer (movie version)
- Ted Jensen – mastering engineer
- Andy Wallace – mixing engineer (single version)
- Doug McKeen – mixing engineer (movie version)
- Martin Eriksson Sandmark – recording engineer
- Stefan Boman – recording engineer
- Dan Malsch – mixing assistant

== Charts ==
=== Weekly charts ===
Weekly chart performance for "Hunter's Moon"
Chart (2021–2022)	Peak position
Canada Rock (Billboard)	46
Czech Republic (Modern Rock)	3
Sweden (Sverigetopplistan)	82
UK Singles Downloads (OCC)	60
UK Singles Sales (OCC)	23
UK Physical Singles (OCC)	1
US Hot Rock & Alternative Songs (Billboard)	36
US Rock & Alternative Airplay (Billboard)	8

=== Year-end charts ===
Year-end chart performance for "Hunter's Moon"
Chart (2022)	Position
UK Vinyl Singles (OCC)	12
US Hot Hard Rock Songs (Billboard)	32
US Mainstream Rock (Billboard)	33
