= Opus Eponymous =

Studio album by Ghost
- Released: 18 October 2010
- Studios: Manfire Recordings, White Light Studio
- Genres: Heavy metal; doom metal; hard rock; psychedelic rock
- Length: 34:41
- Labels: Rise Above; Metal Blade; Trooper Entertainment
- Producer: Tobias Forge (under the alias 'Gene Walker')

Ghost chronology
Opus Eponymous (2010)	Infestissumam (2013)

Singles from Opus Eponymous
- 1. "Elizabeth" Released: 20 June 2010

Opus Eponymous is the debut studio album by the Swedish rock band Ghost. It was released on 18 October 2010, on the independent record label Rise Above. It was released in North America on 18 January 2011, and in Japan on 6 April 2011. The album was recorded in the band's hometown and produced by Gene Walker. Opus Eponymous was nominated for a Grammis Award. The Japanese release contains an additional bonus track: a cover of the Beatles' "Here Comes the Sun".

== Background ==
A band member, all of whom are referred to only as Nameless Ghouls, explained that the songs on Opus Eponymous were written in 2007 and 2008, around two years before the album was released. Tobias Forge said that it was the song "Stand by Him" that heralded the start of the band: "while being together in another band, Ghost started when I played a riff to everybody else. I said that this is probably the most heavy metal riff that has ever existed. Then I showed them the opening riff to 'Stand by Him'. When the chorus came to me, it haunted my dreams. Every time I picked up the guitar, I ended up playing that progression, and when I fit the words in, it seemed to cry out for a Satanically-oriented lyric. This was in 2006. When we came up with the name Ghost, it seemed only natural to build on the foundation of this heavy imagery. Within that concept we were able to combine our love of horror films, and of course, the traditions of Scandinavian metal." The lyrics to "Stand by Him" were originally in Swedish.

Forge contacted his former Repugnant bandmate Gustaf Lindström and recorded demos of "Stand by Him", "Prime Mover" and "Death Knell" in early 2008. It was the songs that caused Ghost to become a theatrical band with their Satanic theme: "Very early on, when the material came together in the project phase before it was actually a band, when it was a logo and a couple of songs, it came together by itself because the material and the lyrics sort of screamed a over-the-top commitment to the dark side. It is hard to make that credible and really eerie. What we thought of when we heard the songs is basically a band that looks the way we do now", explained a Ghoul. Although he sang on the demos, Forge did not want to be the singer, preferring to be the guitarist. He approached several vocalists for the role, including Messiah Marcolin, Mats Levén, Christer Göransson of Mindless Sinner, and JB Christoffersson. All of these singers turned down the offer, leading Forge to take the position himself. Forge uploaded the demos to Myspace on 12 March 2010. The musician later stated "that night, my whole life changed;" within two days of posting the demos, he was contacted by record labels from around the world. Forge's older brother Sebastian died the same day the demos were released.

The album artwork is a reference to a promotional poster for the 1979 television miniseries adaption of Stephen King's 'Salem's Lot.

=== Recording ===
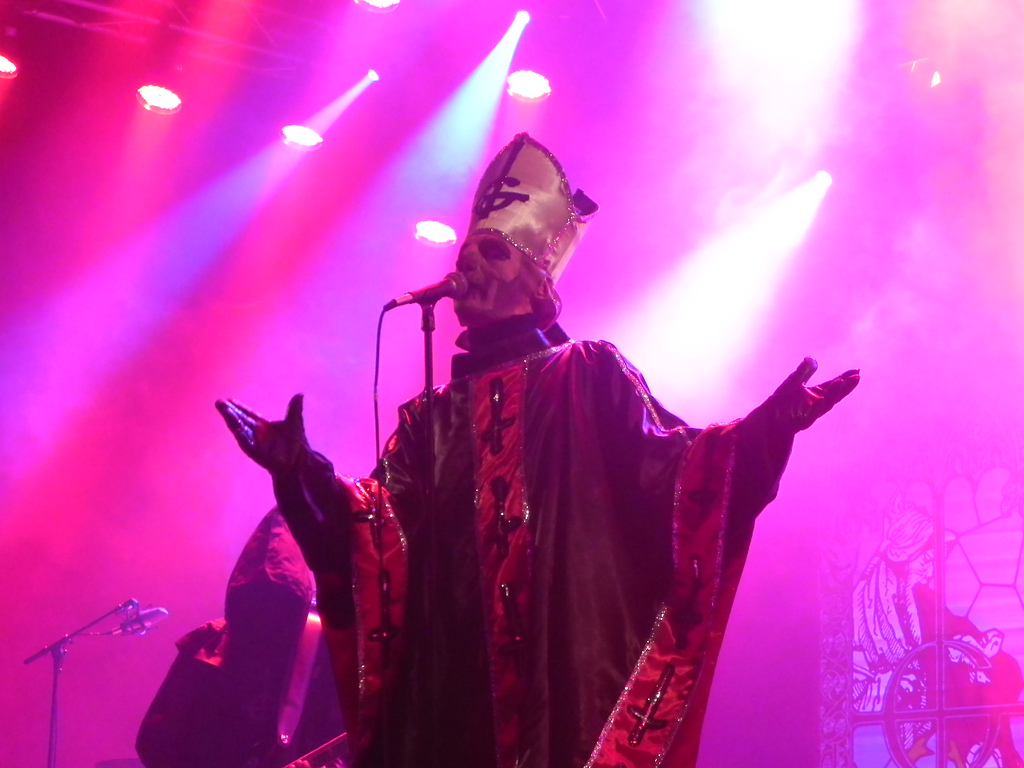
Ghost performing at Roskilde Festival 2011

Opus Eponymous was recorded over the course of a few weeks in a basement studio in the band's hometown of Linköping. It was mixed and mastered by Jaime Gomez Arellano (Ulver, Angel Witch) at Orgone Mastering in London. One Nameless Ghoul said "We did the whole thing with a standard Gibson SG", and explained they were limited as opposed to their second album, "which is why a lot of the guitars sound more traditionally metal." Another stated "We played everything through an Orange Thunderverb 50. To get a real Seventies vibe, we backed up the gain as much as possible without losing the tone or the sustain. We found that the midrange was really important as well. That's why we used Orange amps." Tobias Forge stated that the album was recorded with a session drummer and nothing else.

The song "Elizabeth" is about Elizabeth Báthory. The tracks "Con Clavi Con Dio" and "Genesis" are sped up waltzes.

Describing why they covered "Here Comes the Sun", a Ghoul said "I've been a fan of Beatles even longer than I've been listening to hard rock, so it made a lot of sense." He explained that the band selects songs to cover based on if they can adapt it into their own: "We sort of found the angle of taking that so and inverting it. And that's something that's sort of the Ghost recipe for doing covers, it has to be a song that has some sort of tongue-in-cheek inversion quality to it. And that song just screamed 'cover'."

The theme of Opus Eponymous ties in with the band's second album, Infestissumam: "Everything on the first record was about a coming darkness, an impending doom. Whereas the new record is about something present, and literally, the new record deals with the presence of the Anti-Christ, the Devil." The first album ended with "Genesis", the birth of the Antichrist, and Infestissumam continues from the Antichrist's birth onward.

== Reception ==
Professional ratings
Review scores
Source	Rating
AllMusic	4/5 stars
Angry Metal Guy	4.5/5
The Austin Chronicle	4/5 stars
Decibel	9/10
Loud Magazine Australia	98%
Metal Forces	7/10
PopMatters	8/10
Punknews.org	8/10
Sputnikmusic	4.5/5 stars
The Washington Times	8.5/10

Opus Eponymous entered the Sverigetopplistan Albums Top 60 chart at No. 59, staying on the charts for 5 weeks and peaking at No. 50. The album was nominated for the 2011 Grammis Award (the Swedish equivalent to the Grammy Awards) in the "Best Hard Rock" category. In the June 2011 edition of Sweden Rock Magazine it was named the third best album in the past decade, with the first two being The Final Frontier and A Matter of Life and Death by Iron Maiden. The album's cover was declared the fourth best of 2010 by Revolver magazine. Noisecreep listed Ghost's version of "Here Comes the Sun" at number six on their list of the 10 Best Metal Cover Songs. In their roundup of the 25 Best Metal Albums of 2010–2019, the music blog MetalSucks declared Opus Eponymous to be the 5th best metal album of the '10s.

In 2015, Benjamin Hedge Olson of PopMatters called Opus Eponymous a 21st-century classic: "The production oozed spot-on early-'80s atmosphere, the lyrics were blatantly Satanic without being silly, and whomever Nameless Ghoul wrote those tracks was a master of hooks and melody."

== Track listing ==
All original songs credited to "A Ghoul Writer" in the booklet; actual writing credits adapted from ASCAP. Per ASCAP, all tracks are written by Tobias Forge except where noted.

No.	Title	Length
1.	"Deus Culpa" (instrumental)	1:33
2.	"Con Clavi Con Dio"	3:33
3.	"Ritual"	4:28
4.	"Elizabeth"	4:01
5.	"Stand by Him"	3:56
6.	"Satan Prayer"	4:38
7.	"Death Knell"	4:36
8.	"Prime Mover"	3:53
9.	"Genesis" (instrumental)	4:03
Total length:		34:41

Japanese edition bonus track
No.	Title	Writer(s)	Length
10.	"Here Comes the Sun" (The Beatles cover)	George Harrison	3:24
Total length:			38:05

== Personnel ==
=== Ghost ===
In the liner notes, the performers are only credited as Ghost.

- Tobias Forge – vocals, guitars, keyboards
- Gustaf Lindström – bass
- Ludvig Kennberg – drums

=== Additional personnel ===
- Tobias Forge (credited as "Gene Walker") – production
- Jaime Gomez Arellano – mixing, mastering
- Simon Söderberg – recording
- Joakim Kärling – additional recording
- Basilevs 254 – artwork
- Trident Arts – design

== Charts ==
Chart (2010)	Peak position
German Albums (Offizielle Top 100)	90
Swedish Albums (Sverigetopplistan)	30
