= List of songs recorded by Nine Inch Nails =

Songs recorded by Nine Inch Nails

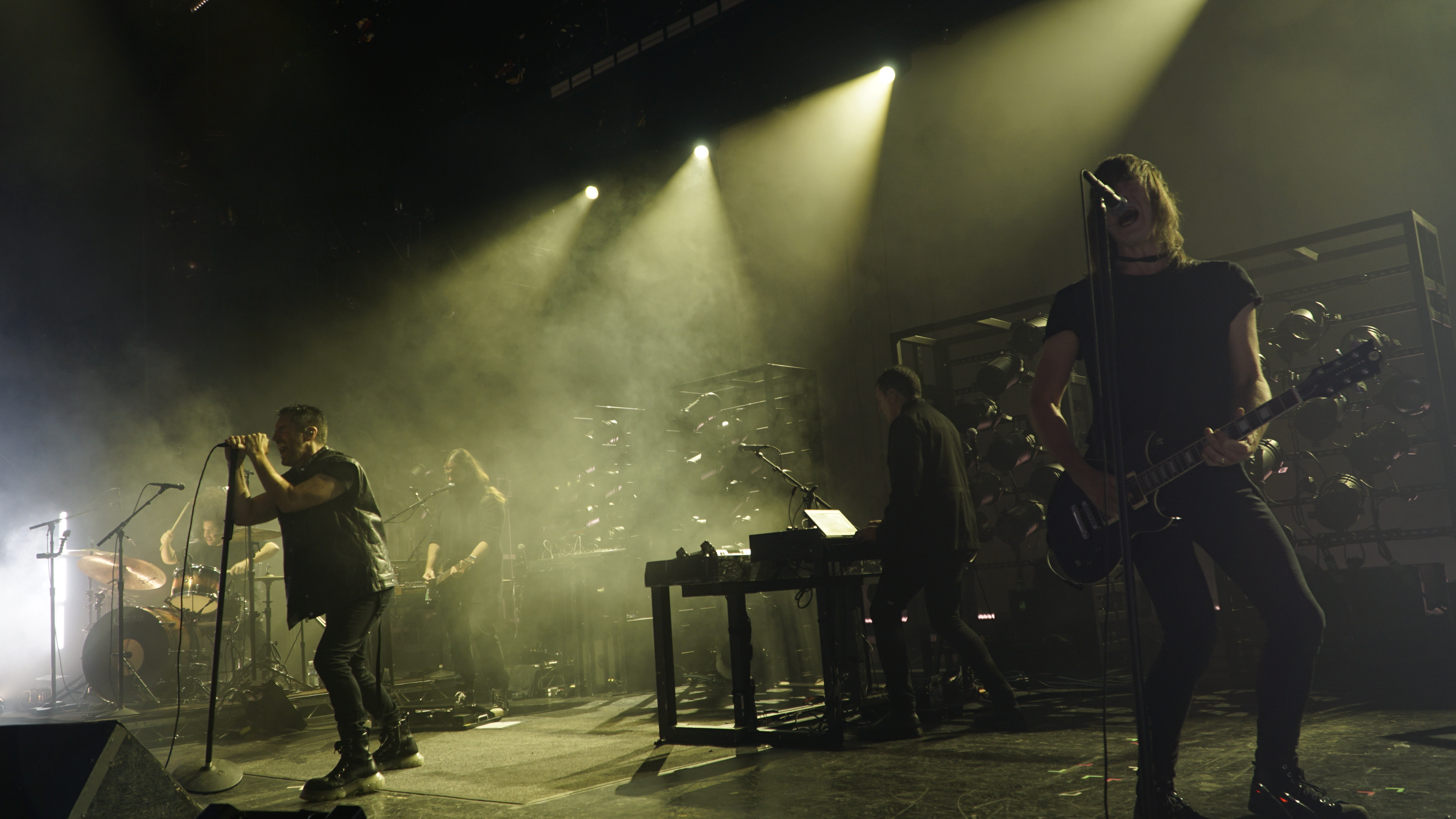
Nine Inch Nails performing in June 2022; from left to right: Ilan Rubin, Trent Reznor, Alessandro Cortini, Atticus Ross, and Robin Finck.

This is a list of every song ever released by American industrial rock band Nine Inch Nails. It gives information about songwriter(s), length, original release, and year of release. It contains all the songs of the previously released albums, singles and EPs, and all B-sides.

== Songs ==
Key
| ‡ | Indicates cover version |
| † | Indicates song released as a single |

Name of song, writer(s), original release, length of song, and year of release
| Title | Writer(s) | Original release | Length | Year | Ref. |
|---|---|---|---|---|---|
| "1 Ghosts I" | Trent Reznor; Atticus Ross | Ghosts I–IV | 2:48 | 2008 | |
| "1,000,000" | Trent Reznor | The Slip | 3:56 | 2008 | |
| "2 Ghosts I" | Trent Reznor; Atticus Ross | Ghosts I–IV | 3:16 | 2008 | |
| "3 Ghosts I" | Trent Reznor; Atticus Ross | Ghosts I–IV | 3:51 | 2008 | |
| "4 Ghosts I" | Trent Reznor; Atticus Ross; Alessandro Cortini | Ghosts I–IV | 2:13 | 2008 | |
| "5 Ghosts I" | Trent Reznor; Atticus Ross | Ghosts I–IV | 2:51 | 2008 | |
| "6 Ghosts I" | Trent Reznor; Atticus Ross | Ghosts I–IV | 4:18 | 2008 | |
| "7 Ghosts I" | Trent Reznor; Atticus Ross | Ghosts I–IV | 2:00 | 2008 | |
| "8 Ghosts I" | Trent Reznor; Atticus Ross | Ghosts I–IV | 2:56 | 2008 | |
| "9 Ghosts I" | Trent Reznor; Atticus Ross | Ghosts I–IV | 2:47 | 2008 | |
| "10 Ghosts II" | Trent Reznor; Atticus Ross | Ghosts I–IV | 2:42 | 2008 | |
| "10 Miles High" | Trent Reznor | The Fragile (LP edition) | 5:13 | 1999 | |
| "11 Ghosts II" | Trent Reznor; Atticus Ross; Alessandro Cortini | Ghosts I–IV | 2:17 | 2008 | |
| "12 Ghosts II" | Trent Reznor; Atticus Ross | Ghosts I–IV | 2:17 | 2008 | |
| "13 Ghosts II" | Trent Reznor; Atticus Ross | Ghosts I–IV | 3:13 | 2008 | |
| "14 Ghosts II" | Trent Reznor; Atticus Ross | Ghosts I–IV | 3:05 | 2008 | |
| "15 Ghosts II" | Trent Reznor; Atticus Ross | Ghosts I–IV | 1:53 | 2008 | |
| "16 Ghosts II" | Trent Reznor; Atticus Ross | Ghosts I–IV | 2:30 | 2008 | |
| "17 Ghosts II" | Trent Reznor; Atticus Ross; Alessandro Cortini | Ghosts I–IV | 2:13 | 2008 | |
| "18 Ghosts II" | Trent Reznor; Atticus Ross | Ghosts I–IV | 5:22 | 2008 | |
| "19 Ghosts III" | Trent Reznor; Atticus Ross; Alessandro Cortini; Brian Viglione | Ghosts I–IV | 2:11 | 2008 | |
| "20 Ghosts III" | Trent Reznor; Atticus Ross | Ghosts I–IV | 3:39 | 2008 | |
| "21 Ghosts III" | Trent Reznor; Atticus Ross | Ghosts I–IV | 2:54 | 2008 | |
| "22 Ghosts III" | Trent Reznor; Atticus Ross; Alessandro Cortini; Brian Viglione | Ghosts I–IV | 2:31 | 2008 | |
| "23 Ghosts III" | Trent Reznor; Atticus Ross | Ghosts I–IV | 2:43 | 2008 | |
| "24 Ghosts III" | Trent Reznor; Atticus Ross | Ghosts I–IV | 2:39 | 2008 | |
| "25 Ghosts III" | Trent Reznor; Atticus Ross; Adrian Belew | Ghosts I–IV | 1:58 | 2008 | |
| "26 Ghosts III" | Trent Reznor; Atticus Ross | Ghosts I–IV | 2:25 | 2008 | |
| "27 Ghosts III" | Trent Reznor; Atticus Ross; Adrian Belew | Ghosts I–IV | 2:51 | 2008 | |
| "28 Ghosts IV" | Trent Reznor; Atticus Ross | Ghosts I–IV | 5:22 | 2008 | |
| "29 Ghosts IV" | Trent Reznor; Atticus Ross; Alessandro Cortini | Ghosts I–IV | 2:54 | 2008 | |
| "30 Ghosts IV" | Trent Reznor; Atticus Ross | Ghosts I–IV | 2:58 | 2008 | |
| "31 Ghosts IV" | Trent Reznor; Atticus Ross | Ghosts I–IV | 2:25 | 2008 | |
| "32 Ghosts IV" | Trent Reznor; Atticus Ross | Ghosts I–IV | 4:25 | 2008 | |
| "33 Ghosts IV" | Trent Reznor; Atticus Ross; Alessandro Cortini | Ghosts I–IV | 4:01 | 2008 | |
| "34 Ghosts IV" | Trent Reznor; Atticus Ross | Ghosts I–IV | 5:52 | 2008 | |
| "35 Ghosts IV" | Trent Reznor; Atticus Ross | Ghosts I–IV | 3:29 | 2008 | |
| "36 Ghosts IV" | Trent Reznor; Atticus Ross | Ghosts I–IV | 2:19 | 2008 | |
| "37 Ghosts" | Trent Reznor; Atticus Ross | Ghosts I–IV (deluxe edition) | 2:20 | 2008 | |
| "38 Ghosts" | Trent Reznor; Atticus Ross | Ghosts I–IV (deluxe edition) | 4:51 | 2008 | |
| "100% Expendable" | Trent Reznor; Atticus Ross | Tron: Ares (soundtrack) | 3:54 | 2025 | |
| "999,999" | Trent Reznor | The Slip | 1:25 | 2008 | |
| "Adrift and at Peace" | Trent Reznor | And All That Could Have Been (Still) | 2:52 | 2002 | |
| "Ahead of Ourselves" | Trent Reznor; Atticus Ross | Bad Witch | 3:30 | 2018 | |
| "All the Love in the World" | Trent Reznor | With Teeth | 5:15 | 2005 | |
| "All Time Low" | Trent Reznor | Hesitation Marks | 6:18 | 2013 | |
| "Almost Dawn" | Trent Reznor; Atticus Ross | Ghosts VI: Locusts | 5:34 | 2020 | |
| "And All That Could Have Been" | Trent Reznor; Danny Lohner | And All That Could Have Been (Still) | 6:14 | 2002 | |
| "Another Crashed Car" | Trent Reznor; Atticus Ross | Ghosts VI: Locusts | 2:24 | 2020 | |
| "Another Version of the Truth" | Trent Reznor | Year Zero | 4:09 | 2007 | |
| "Apart" | Trent Reznor; Atticus Ross | Ghosts V: Together | 13:36 | 2020 | |
| "+Appendage" | Trent Reznor | The Fragile (Cassette edition) | 3:19 | 1999 | |
| "Around Every Corner" | Trent Reznor; Atticus Ross | Ghosts VI: Locusts | 10:53 | 2020 | |
| "As Alive as You Need Me to Be" † | Trent Reznor; Atticus Ross | Tron: Ares (soundtrack) | 3:53 | 2025 | |
| "The Background World" | Trent Reznor; Atticus Ross | Add Violence (EP) | 11:44 | 2017 | |
| "The Becoming" | Trent Reznor | The Downward Spiral | 5:31 | 1994 | |
| "The Beginning of the End" | Trent Reznor | Year Zero | 2:47 | 2007 | |
| "Beside You in Time" | Trent Reznor | With Teeth | 5:25 | 2005 | |
| "The Big Come Down" | Trent Reznor | The Fragile | 4:12 | 1999 | |
| "Big Man with a Gun" | Trent Reznor | The Downward Spiral | 1:36 | 1994 | |
| "Black Noise" | Trent Reznor | Hesitation Marks | 1:29 | 2013 | |
| "Branches/Bones" | Trent Reznor; Atticus Ross | Not the Actual Events (EP) | 1:47 | 2016 | |
| "Building Better Worlds" | Trent Reznor; Atticus Ross | Tron: Ares (soundtrack) | 2:11 | 2025 | |
| "Burn" | Trent Reznor | Natural Born Killers (soundtrack) | 4:58 | 1994 | |
| "Burning Bright (Field on Fire)" | Trent Reznor; Atticus Ross | Not the Actual Events (EP) | 5:50 | 2016 | |
| "Can I Stay Here?" | Trent Reznor | The Fragile: Deviations 1 | 4:25 | 2016 | |
| "Came Back Haunted" † | Trent Reznor | Hesitation Marks | 5:17 | 2013 | |
| "Capital G" † | Trent Reznor | Year Zero | 3:50 | 2007 | |
| "Claustrophobia Machine (Raw)" | Trent Reznor | The Fragile: Deviations 1 | 2:39 | 2016 | |
| "Closer" (Note: The single release of "Closer" is titled "Closer to God".) † | Trent Reznor | The Downward Spiral | 6:13 | 1994 | |
| "Complication" | Trent Reznor | The Fragile | 2:30 | 1999 | |
| "The Collector" | Trent Reznor | With Teeth | 3:08 | 2005 | |
| "Copy of a" † | Trent Reznor | Hesitation Marks | 5:23 | 2013 | |
| "Corona Radiata" | Trent Reznor | The Slip | 7:33 | 2008 | |
| "The Cursed Clock" | Trent Reznor; Atticus Ross | Ghosts VI: Locusts | 7:00 | 2020 | |
| "Daemonize" | Trent Reznor; Atticus Ross | Tron: Ares (soundtrack) | 5:09 | 2025 | |
| "The Day the World Went Away" † | Trent Reznor | The Fragile | 5:01 | 1999 | |
| "Dead Souls" (Joy Division cover) | Ian Curtis; Bernard Sumner; Peter Hook; Stephen Morris ‡ | The Crow (soundtrack) | 4:52 | 1994 | |
| "Dear World," | Trent Reznor; Atticus Ross | Not the Actual Events (EP) | 4:07 | 2016 | |
| "Deep" | Trent Reznor | Lara Croft: Tomb Raider (soundtrack) | 4:06 | 2001 | |
| "Demon Seed" | Trent Reznor | The Slip | 4:59 | 2008 | |
| "Disappointed" | Trent Reznor | Hesitation Marks | 5:44 | 2013 | |
| "Discipline" † | Trent Reznor | The Slip | 4:19 | 2008 | |
| "Down in It" † | Trent Reznor | Pretty Hate Machine | 3:48 | 1988 | |
| "The Downward Spiral" | Trent Reznor | The Downward Spiral | 3:57 | 1994 | |
| "The Eater of Dreams" | Trent Reznor; Alessandro Cortini | Hesitation Marks | 0:52 | 2013 | |
| "Echoes" | Trent Reznor; Atticus Ross | Tron: Ares (soundtrack) | 3:46 | 2025 | |
| "Echoplex" | Trent Reznor | The Slip | 4:45 | 2008 | |
| "Empathetic Response" | Trent Reznor; Atticus Ross | Tron: Ares (soundtrack) | 2:09 | 2025 | |
| "Eraser" | Trent Reznor | The Downward Spiral | 4:54 | 1994 | |
| "Even Deeper" | Trent Reznor; Danny Lohner | The Fragile | 6:14 | 1999 | |
| "Every Day Is Exactly the Same" † | Trent Reznor | With Teeth | 4:55 | 2005 | |
| "Everything" † | Trent Reznor | Hesitation Marks | 3:20 | 2013 | |
| "Feeders" | Trent Reznor | The Fragile: Deviations 1 | 2:02 | 2016 | |
| "Find My Way" | Trent Reznor | Hesitation Marks | 5:16 | 2013 | |
| "Forked Reality" | Trent Reznor; Atticus Ross | Tron: Ares (soundtrack) | 1:50 | 2025 | |
| "The Four of Us Are Dying" | Trent Reznor | The Slip | 4:37 | 2008 | |
| "The Fragile" | Trent Reznor | The Fragile | 4:35 | 1999 | |
| "The Frail" | Trent Reznor | The Fragile | 1:54 | 1999 | |
| "Gave Up" | Trent Reznor | Broken (EP) | 4:08 | 1992 | |
| "Get Down Make Love" (Queen cover) | Freddie Mercury ‡ | Pretty Hate Machine | 4:19 | 1989 | |
| "Getting Smaller" | Trent Reznor | With Teeth | 3:35 | 2005 | |
| "Ghost in the Machine" | Trent Reznor; Atticus Ross | Tron: Ares (soundtrack) | 1:29 | 2025 | |
| "God Break Down the Door" † | Trent Reznor; Atticus Ross | Bad Witch | 4:14 | 2018 | |
| "God Given" | Trent Reznor | Year Zero | 3:50 | 2007 | |
| "Gone, Still" | Trent Reznor | And All That Could Have Been (Still) | 2:36 | 2002 | |
| "The Good Soldier" | Trent Reznor | Year Zero | 3:23 | 2007 | |
| "The Great Below" | Trent Reznor | The Fragile | 5:17 | 1999 | |
| "The Great Collapse" | Trent Reznor | Things Falling Apart (remix album) | 4:42 | 2000 | |
| "The Great Destroyer" | Trent Reznor | Year Zero | 3:17 | 2007 | |
| "The Greater Good" | Trent Reznor | Year Zero | 4:52 | 2007 | |
| "The Hand That Feeds" † | Trent Reznor | With Teeth | 3:32 | 2005 | |
| "Happiness in Slavery" | Trent Reznor | Broken (EP) | 5:21 | 1992 | |
| "Head Down" | Trent Reznor | The Slip | 4:55 | 2008 | |
| "Head Like a Hole" † | Trent Reznor | Pretty Hate Machine | 4:59 | 1989 | |
| "Help Me I Am in Hell" | Trent Reznor | Broken (EP) | 1:56 | 1992 | |
| "Heresy" | Trent Reznor | The Downward Spiral | 3:54 | 1994 | |
| "Home" | Trent Reznor | B-side of "The Hand That Feeds" (7" promo) | 3:14 | 2005 | |
| "Hope We Can Again" | Trent Reznor; Atticus Ross | Ghosts V: Together | 7:28 | 2020 | |
| "Hurt" | Trent Reznor | The Downward Spiral | 6:13 | 1994 | |
| "Hyperpower!" | Trent Reznor | Year Zero | 1:42 | 2007 | |
| "I Do Not Want This" | Trent Reznor | The Downward Spiral | 5:41 | 1994 | |
| "I Know You Can Feel It" | Trent Reznor; Atticus Ross | Tron: Ares (soundtrack) | 5:21 | 2025 | |
| "I Would for You" | Trent Reznor | Hesitation Marks | 4:33 | 2013 | |
| "I'm Looking Forward to Joining You, Finally" | Trent Reznor | The Fragile | 4:13 | 1999 | |
| "I'm Not from This World" | Trent Reznor; Atticus Ross | Bad Witch | 6:41 | 2018 | |
| "The Idea of You" | Trent Reznor; Atticus Ross | Not the Actual Events (EP) | 3:27 | 2016 | |
| "In the Image Of" | Trent Reznor; Atticus Ross | Tron: Ares (soundtrack) | 1:33 | 2025 | |
| "In This Twilight" | Trent Reznor | Year Zero | 3:33 | 2007 | |
| "In Two" | Trent Reznor | Hesitation Marks | 5:32 | 2013 | |
| "Infiltrator" | Trent Reznor; Atticus Ross | Tron: Ares (soundtrack) | 2:47 | 2025 | |
| "Init" | Trent Reznor; Atticus Ross | Tron: Ares (soundtrack) | 2:07 | 2025 | |
| "Into the Void" † | Trent Reznor | The Fragile | 4:49 | 1999 | |
| "Just Breathe" | Trent Reznor; Atticus Ross | Ghosts VI: Locusts | 7:00 | 2020 | |
| "Just Like You Imagined" | Trent Reznor | The Fragile | 3:49 | 1999 | |
| "Kinda I Want To" | Trent Reznor | Pretty Hate Machine | 4:33 | 1988 | |
| "La Mer" | Trent Reznor | The Fragile | 5:02 | 1999 | |
| "Last" | Trent Reznor | Broken (EP) | 4:44 | 1992 | |
| "Last Heard From" | Trent Reznor | The Fragile: Deviations 1 | 2:06 | 2016 | |
| "Leaving Hope" | Trent Reznor | And All That Could Have Been (Still) | 5:57 | 2002 | |
| "Less Than" † | Trent Reznor; Atticus Ross | Add Violence (EP) | 3:30 | 2017 | |
| "Letting Go While Holding On" | Trent Reznor; Atticus Ross | Ghosts V: Together | 9:40 | 2020 | |
| "Letting You" | Trent Reznor | The Slip | 3:49 | 2008 | |
| "Lights in the Sky" | Trent Reznor | The Slip | 3:29 | 2008 | |
| "The Line Begins to Blur" | Trent Reznor | With Teeth | 3:44 | 2005 | |
| "Love Is Not Enough" | Trent Reznor | With Teeth | 3:41 | 2005 | |
| "The Lovers" | Trent Reznor; Atticus Ross | Add Violence (EP) | 4:10 | 2017 | |
| "The March" | Trent Reznor | The Fragile: Deviations 1 | 3:42 | 2016 | |
| "March of the Fuckheads" | Trent Reznor | B-side of "Closer to God" | 4:43 | 1994 | |
| "March of the Pigs" † | Trent Reznor | The Downward Spiral | 2:58 | 1994 | |
| "The Mark Has Been Made" | Trent Reznor | The Fragile | 4:43 | 1999 | |
| "Maybe Just Once" | Trent Reznor | Purest Feeling (unreleased demo) | 5:16 | 1988 | |
| "Me, I'm Not" | Trent Reznor | Year Zero | 4:51 | 2007 | |
| "Meet Your Master" | Trent Reznor | Year Zero | 4:08 | 2007 | |
| "Memorabilia" (Soft Cell cover) | Dave Ball; Marc Almond ‡ | B-side of "Closer to God" | 7:21 | 1994 | |
| "Metal" (Gary Numan cover) | Gary Numan ‡ | Things Falling Apart (remix album) | 7:05 | 2000 | |
| "Missing Places" | Trent Reznor | The Fragile: Deviations 1 | 1:26 | 2016 | |
| "Mr. Self Destruct" | Trent Reznor | The Downward Spiral | 4:30 | 1994 | |
| "My Violent Heart" | Trent Reznor | Year Zero | 4:13 | 2007 | |
| "Nemesis" | Trent Reznor; Atticus Ross | Tron: Ares (soundtrack) | 2:45 | 2025 | |
| "New Directive" | Trent Reznor; Atticus Ross | Tron: Ares (soundtrack) | 2:45 | 2025 | |
| "The New Flesh" | Trent Reznor | The Fragile (LP edition) | 3:40 | 1999 | |
| "No Going Back" | Trent Reznor; Atticus Ross | Tron: Ares (soundtrack) | 1:55 | 2025 | |
| "No, You Don't" | Trent Reznor | The Fragile | 3:35 | 1999 | |
| "Not Anymore" | Trent Reznor; Atticus Ross | Add Violence (EP) | 3:07 | 2017 | |
| "Non-Entity" | Trent Reznor | NINJA 2009 Tour Sampler (EP) | 4:03 | 2009 | |
| "Not So Pretty Now" | Trent Reznor | NINJA 2009 Tour Sampler (EP) | 3:50 | 2009 | |
| "Not What It Seems Like" | Trent Reznor | The Fragile: Deviations 1 | 3:30 | 2016 | |
| "One Way to Get There" | Trent Reznor | The Fragile: Deviations 1 | 2:44 | 2016 | |
| "Only" † | Trent Reznor | With Teeth | 4:23 | 2005 | |
| "The Only Time" | Trent Reznor | Pretty Hate Machine | 4:47 | 1988 | |
| "Out in the Open" | Trent Reznor; Atticus Ross | Ghosts V: Together | 5:16 | 2020 | |
| "Out in the World" | Trent Reznor; Atticus Ross | Tron: Ares (soundtrack) | 1:05 | 2025 | |
| "Over and Out" | Trent Reznor; Atticus Ross | Bad Witch | 7:49 | 2018 | |
| "The Perfect Drug" † | Trent Reznor | Lost Highway (soundtrack) | 5:15 | 1996 | |
| "Permanence" | Trent Reznor; Atticus Ross | Tron: Ares (soundtrack) | 1:29 | 2025 | |
| "The Persistence of Loss" | Trent Reznor | And All That Could Have Been (Still) | 4:04 | 2002 | |
| "Physical" (Adam and the Ants cover) | Adam Ant ‡ | Broken (EP) | 5:29 | 1992 | |
| "Piggy" | Trent Reznor | The Downward Spiral | 4:24 | 1994 | |
| "Pilgrimage" | Trent Reznor | The Fragile | 3:31 | 1999 | |
| "Pinion" | Trent Reznor | Broken (EP) | 1:02 | 1992 | |
| "Play the Goddamned Part" | Trent Reznor; Atticus Ross | Bad Witch | 4:51 | 2018 | |
| "Please" | Trent Reznor | The Fragile | 3:30 | 1999 | |
| "Purest Feeling" | Trent Reznor | Purest Feeling (unreleased demo) | 2:57 | 1988 | |
| "A Question of Trust" | Trent Reznor; Atticus Ross | Tron: Ares (soundtrack) | 1:20 | 2025 | |
| "A Really Bad Night" | Trent Reznor; Atticus Ross | Ghosts VI: Locusts | 4:54 | 2020 | |
| "Reptile" | Trent Reznor | The Downward Spiral | 6:51 | 1994 | |
| "Right Behind You" | Trent Reznor; Atticus Ross | Ghosts VI: Locusts | 1:44 | 2020 | |
| "Right Where It Belongs" | Trent Reznor | With Teeth | 5:04 | 2005 | |
| "Ripe (With Decay)" | Trent Reznor | The Fragile | 6:34 | 1999 | |
| "Ruiner" | Trent Reznor | The Downward Spiral | 4:58 | 1994 | |
| "Running" | Trent Reznor | Hesitation Marks | 4:08 | 2013 | |
| "Run Like Hell" | Trent Reznor; Atticus Ross | Ghosts VI: Locusts | 5:38 | 2020 | |
| "Sanctified" | Trent Reznor | Pretty Hate Machine | 5:48 | 1988 | |
| "Satellite" | Trent Reznor | Hesitation Marks | 5:03 | 2013 | |
| "Shadow Over Me" | Trent Reznor; Atticus Ross | Tron: Ares (soundtrack) | 3:55 | 2025 | |
| "She's Gone Away" | Trent Reznor; Atticus Ross | Not the Actual Events (EP) | 6:00 | 2016 | |
| "Shit Mirror" | Trent Reznor; Atticus Ross | Bad Witch | 3:06 | 2018 | |
| "Sin" † | Trent Reznor | Pretty Hate Machine | 4:06 | 1989 | |
| "Slate (Intro)" | Trent Reznor | Purest Feeling (unreleased demo) | 2:21 | 1988 | |
| "Something I Can Never Have" | Trent Reznor | Pretty Hate Machine | 5:55 | 1989 | |
| "Somewhat Damaged" | Trent Reznor; Danny Lohner | The Fragile | 4:31 | 1999 | |
| "So Tired" | Trent Reznor; Atticus Ross | Ghosts VI: Locusts | 3:45 | 2020 | |
| "Starfuckers, Inc." | Trent Reznor; Charlie Clouser | The Fragile | 5:00 | 1999 | |
| "Still Remains" | Trent Reznor; Atticus Ross | Tron: Ares (soundtrack) | 1:54 | 2025 | |
| "Still Right Here" | Trent Reznor; Atticus Ross | Ghosts V: Together | 10:12 | 2020 | |
| "Suck" (Pigface cover) | Trent Reznor; Pigface (Note: Pigface's original version was credited to Martin Atkins, Bill Rieflin, Paul Barker and Reznor on the liner notes of Gub (1991).) ‡ | Broken (EP) | 5:07 | 1992 | |
| "Sunspots" | Trent Reznor | With Teeth | 4:03 | 2005 | |
| "Survivalism" † | Trent Reznor | Year Zero | 4:23 | 2007 | |
| "Taken" | Trent Reznor | The Fragile: Deviations 1 | 3:35 | 2016 | |
| "Target Identified" | Trent Reznor; Atticus Ross | Tron: Ares (soundtrack) | 3:24 | 2025 | |
| "Temp Fix" | Trent Reznor; Atticus Ross | Ghosts VI: Locusts | 1:46 | 2020 | |
| "Terrible Lie" | Trent Reznor | Pretty Hate Machine | 4:38 | 1989 | |
| "That's What I Get" | Trent Reznor | Pretty Hate Machine | 4:30 | 1988 | |
| "Theme for Tetsuo: The Bullet Man" | Trent Reznor | Tetsuo: The Bullet Man (soundtrack) | 5:34 | 2010 | |
| "This Changes Everything" | Trent Reznor; Atticus Ross | Tron: Ares (soundtrack) | 2:59 | 2025 | |
| "This Isn't the Place" † | Trent Reznor; Atticus Ross | Add Violence (EP) | 4:44 | 2017 | |
| "Together" | Trent Reznor; Atticus Ross | Ghosts V: Together | 10:04 | 2020 | |
| "TOH (Top of the Hour)" | Trent Reznor | Japanese commercial | 0:44 | 1993 | |
| "Trust Fades" | Trent Reznor; Atticus Ross | Ghosts VI: Locusts | 3:13 | 2020 | |
| "Turn This Off Please" | Trent Reznor; Atticus Ross | Ghosts VI: Locusts | 13:10 | 2020 | |
| "Twist" / "Ringfinger" | Trent Reznor | Pretty Hate Machine | 5:48 | 1988 | |
| "Underneath It All" | Trent Reznor | The Fragile | 2:46 | 1999 | |
| "Various Methods of Escape" | Trent Reznor | Hesitation Marks | 5:01 | 2013 | |
| "Vessel" | Trent Reznor | Year Zero | 4:52 | 2007 | |
| "A Violet Fluid" | Trent Reznor | B-side of "March of the Pigs" | 1:05 | 1994 | |
| "A Warm Place" | Trent Reznor | The Downward Spiral | 3:22 | 1994 | |
| "The Warning" | Trent Reznor | Year Zero | 3:38 | 2007 | |
| "Was It Worth It?" | Trent Reznor | The Fragile: Deviations 1 | 5:03 | 2016 | |
| "The Way Out Is Through" | Trent Reznor; Keith Hillebrandt; Charlie Clouser | The Fragile | 4:17 | 1999 | |
| "We're in This Together" † | Trent Reznor | The Fragile | 7:16 | 1999 | |
| "What Have You Done?" | Trent Reznor; Atticus Ross | Tron: Ares (soundtrack) | 2:14 | 2025 | |
| "When It Happens (Don't Mind Me)" | Trent Reznor; Atticus Ross | Ghosts VI: Locusts | 2:56 | 2020 | |
| "Where Is Everybody?" | Trent Reznor | The Fragile | 5:40 | 1999 | |
| "While I'm Still Here" | Trent Reznor; Hank Williams | Hesitation Marks | 4:03 | 2013 | |
| "White Mask" | Trent Reznor | The Fragile: Deviations 1 | 3:22 | 2016 | |
| "Who Wants to Live Forever?" | Trent Reznor; Atticus Ross | Tron: Ares (soundtrack) | 5:50 | 2025 | |
| "Wish" | Trent Reznor | Broken (EP) | 3:46 | 1992 | |
| "With Faith" | Trent Reznor; Atticus Ross | Ghosts V: Together | 9:40 | 2020 | |
| "With Teeth" | Trent Reznor | With Teeth | 5:38 | 2005 | |
| "The Worriment Waltz" | Trent Reznor; Atticus Ross | Ghosts VI: Locusts | 9:26 | 2020 | |
| "The Wretched" | Trent Reznor | The Fragile | 5:36 | 1999 | |
| "You Know What You Are?" | Trent Reznor | With Teeth | 3:42 | 2005 | |
| "Your New Normal" | Trent Reznor; Atticus Ross | Ghosts VI: Locusts | 3:46 | 2020 | |
| "Your Touch" | Trent Reznor; Atticus Ross | Ghosts V: Together | 4:28 | 2020 | |
| "Zero-Sum" | Trent Reznor | Year Zero | 6:14 | 2007 | |
| "Zoo Station" (U2 cover) | Bono; The Edge; Adam Clayton; Larry Mullen Jr. ‡ | AHK-toong BAY-bi Covered | 6:28 | 2011 | |
