= Nothing Records discography =

This is a catalog for Nothing Records, organized alphabetically by catalog number:

== Catalog ==
No.	Artist	Title	Format
0538643	Marilyn Manson	God Is In The T.V.	VHS
060 965-3	Nine Inch Nails	And All That Could Have Been	VHS
060 965-9	Nine Inch Nails	And All That Could Have Been	2xDVD
0602498107614	Marilyn Manson	This Is The New Shit	DVD, Single
0694903742	Nine Inch Nails	Pretty Hate Machine	CD
0694904731	Nine Inch Nails	The Fragile	3xLP
0694904732	Nine Inch Nails	The Fragile	2xCD
0694905102	The The	NakedSelf	CD, Ltd
0694905102	The The	NakedSelf	CD
0694905242	Marilyn Manson	The Last Tour on Earth	CD
0694907441	Nine Inch Nails	Things Falling Apart	2xLP
0694907442	Nine Inch Nails	Things Falling Apart	CD, Album
0694907902	Marilyn Manson	Holy Wood (In The Shadow Of The Valley Of Death)	CD
0694931842	Nine Inch Nails	Still	CD
0694931852	Nine Inch Nails	And All That Could Have Been	CD
0694960932	Nine Inch Nails	Fixed	CD, Maxi
12 NIN 1	Nine Inch Nails	Starfuckers, Inc.	12", Promo
490 086-2	Marilyn Manson	Antichrist Superstar	CD, Album
490 086-2	Marilyn Manson	Antichrist Superstar	CD
490 273-1	Marilyn Manson	Mechanical Animals	2xLP
490 473-2	Nine Inch Nails	The Fragile	2xCD
490 474-4	Nine Inch Nails	The Fragile	2xCass
490 510-2	The The	NakedSelf	CD
490 524-4	Marilyn Manson	The Last Tour On Earth	Cass
490 543-2	Marilyn Manson	The Last Tour On Earth	2xCD
490 790-1	Marilyn Manson	Holy Wood (In The Shadow Of The Valley Of Death)	2xLP
490 790-2	Marilyn Manson	Holy Wood (In The Shadow Of The Valley Of Death)	CD
490 790-4	Marilyn Manson	Holy Wood (In The Shadow Of The Valley Of Death)	Cass
493 186-2	Nine Inch Nails	And All That Could Have Been (CD Box)	2xCD
493 186-2	Nine Inch Nails	And All That Could Have Been (CD Box)	2xCD, Ltd + Box
497 170-2	Marilyn Manson	Coma White	CD, Maxi, Promo
497 200-1	Marilyn Manson	Rock Is Dead	12", Promo
497 244-2	Nine Inch Nails	Into the Void	CD, Maxi
497 273-2	The The	Interpretations: Issue One - The The - ShrunkenMan	CD, Maxi
497 437-2	Marilyn Manson	Disposable Teens Pt. 1	CD, Maxi
497 438-2	Marilyn Manson	Disposable Teens Pt. 2	CD, Maxi
497 458-1	Marilyn Manson	Disposable Teens	12"
497 469-2	Marilyn Manson	Disposable Teens	CD, Maxi
497 485-2	Marilyn Manson	The Fight Song Pt. 1	CD, Maxi
497 486-2	Marilyn Manson	The Fight Song Pt. 2	CD, Maxi
497 490-2	Marilyn Manson	The Fight Song Pt. 1	CD, Maxi
497 491-2	Marilyn Manson	The Fight Song Pt. 2	CD, Maxi
497 604-2	Marilyn Manson	The Nobodies	CD, Maxi, Enh
5760-2	Pop Will Eat Itself	R.S.V.P. (Remixes)	CD, Maxi, Promo
6648909962	Squarepusher	Selection Sixteen	CD, Album
7 92213-2	Nine Inch Nails	Broken	CD, Maxi + CD, Mini
7 92213-4	Nine Inch Nails	Broken	Cass, Maxi
854 000-7	Nine Inch Nails	March of the Pigs	7"
854 001-0	Nine Inch Nails	March of the Pigs	9"
92395-2	Prick	Prick	CD
92395-2	Prick	Prick	CD, Promo
92395-4	Prick	Prick	Cass, Promo
92395-4	Prick	Prick	Cass
92460-2	Various	Natural Born Killers: A Soundtrack For An Oliver Stone Film	CD
92641-2	Marilyn Manson	Smells Like Children	CD, Promo
95287-1	12 Rounds	12 Rounds	Cass, Promo
95887-0	Pop Will Eat Itself	Amalgamation	12"
95887-2	Pop Will Eat Itself	Amalgamation	CD, Maxi
95905-2	Nine Inch Nails	Closer To God	CD, Maxi
95938-2	Nine Inch Nails	March of the Pigs	CD, Maxi
9637	Marilyn Manson	The Beautiful People	12", Promo
980 772-8	Marilyn Manson	Mobscene	7"
B0000370-10	Marilyn Manson	The Golden Age Of Grotesque	CD + DVD, NTSC
B0000372-32	Marilyn Manson	Mobscene	CD, Maxi
B0004553-01	Nine Inch Nails	With Teeth	2xLP
B0004553-02	Nine Inch Nails	With Teeth	CD
B0004553-82	Nine Inch Nails	With Teeth	DualDisc, NTSC, 5.1, Album
B0005465-11	Nine Inch Nails	Only (Remixes By Richard X And El-P)	12"
B0006589-22	Nine Inch Nails	Every Day Is Exactly the Same	CD, Maxi
CD 92393	Pop Will Eat Itself	Dos Dedos Mis Amigos	CD
CDP 657-2	Marilyn Manson	Disposable Teens	CD, Maxi, Promo
CINTD-90090	Various	Lost Highway	CD
DS 8697	Marilyn Manson	This Is The New Shit	CD, Maxi
INC-90090	Various	Lost Highway	Cass
INC-90273	Marilyn Manson	Mechanical Animals	Cass
IND 90273	Marilyn Manson	Mechanical Animals	CD
IND-90086	Marilyn Manson	Antichrist Superstar	CD
IND-92344	Marilyn Manson	Portrait Of An American Family	CD
IND-92541P	Marilyn Manson	Smells Like Children	LP
IND-95504	Marilyn Manson	Sweet Dreams	CD, Maxi
IND-95514	Marilyn Manson	The Beautiful People	CD, Maxi
IND-95541	Marilyn Manson	The Beautiful People Pt. 1	CD, Maxi
IND-95541	Marilyn Manson	The Beautiful People	CD, Maxi
IND-95542	Nine Inch Nails	The Perfect Drug (Versions)	CD, Maxi
IND-95552	Marilyn Manson	Tourniquet Pt. 1	CD, Maxi
IND-95603	Marilyn Manson	The Dope Show	CD, Maxi
IND-95609	Marilyn Manson	The Dope Show	CD, Maxi, Enh
IND-95610	Marilyn Manson	The Dope Show	CD, Maxi
IND-95617	Marilyn Manson	The Dope Show	CD, Maxi
IND-95626	Marilyn Manson	I Don't Like The Drugs (But The Drugs Like Me) Pt. 1	CD, Maxi
IND-95627	Marilyn Manson	I Don't Like The Drugs (But The Drugs Like Me)	CD, Maxi
IND-95630	Marilyn Manson	I Don't Like The Drugs (But The Drugs Like Me)	CD, Maxi
IND-97520	Marilyn Manson	Tourniquet	CD, Maxi
IND-97604	Marilyn Manson	The Nobodies	CD, Maxi
INDX-95541	Marilyn Manson	The Beautiful People Pt. 2	CD, Maxi
INDX-95552	Marilyn Manson	Tourniquet Pt. 2	CD, Maxi
INDX-95610	Marilyn Manson	The Dope Show Pt. 2	CD, Maxi
INF-95626	Marilyn Manson	I Don't Like The Drugs (But The Drugs Like Me Pt. 2)	CD, Maxi
INT-90273	Marilyn Manson	Mechanical Animals	CD, Enh
INT12-95027	Meat Beat Manifesto	Acid Again	12"
INT12-97026	Nine Inch Nails	The Day the World Went Away	12"
INT2-90273	Marilyn Manson	Mechanical Animals	2xLP
INT3P-6246	Plug	Drum 'N Bass For Papa / Plugs 1, 2, & 3	2xCD, Promo
INT3P-6520	Squarepusher	Budakhan Mindphone	CD, Promo
INT5P-0540	Marilyn Manson	Rock Is Dead	CD, Maxi, Promo
INT5P-6052	Marilyn Manson	The Beautiful People	CD, Maxi, Promo
INT5P-6069	Nine Inch Nails	The Perfect Drug	CD, Maxi, Promo
INT5P-6101	Marilyn Manson	Tourniquet	CD, Maxi, Promo
INT5P-6170	Marilyn Manson	The Horrible People / Tourniquet	CD, Maxi, Promo
INT5P-6187	Marilyn Manson	Man That You Fear	CD, Maxi, Promo
INT5P-6368	2wo	Deep In The Ground	CD, Maxi, Promo
INT5P-6389	Meat Beat Manifesto	Acid Again	CD, Maxi, Promo
INT5P-6447	Marilyn Manson	The Dope Show	CD, Maxi, Promo
INT5P-6450	Various	Nothing Changes	CD
INT5P-6468	Meat Beat Manifesto	Prime Audio Soup	CD, Maxi, Promo
INT5P-6500	Marilyn Manson	I Don't Like The Drugs (But The Drugs Like Me)	CD, Maxi, Promo
INT5P-6548	Marilyn Manson	Rock Is Dead	CD, Maxi, Promo
INT5P-6687	Nine Inch Nails	We're in This Together	CD, Single, Promo
INT5P-6689	Marilyn Manson	Coma White	CD, Maxi, Promo
INT5P-6723	Marilyn Manson	Astonishing Panorama Of The Endtimes	CD, Maxi, Promo
INT5P-6754	Nine Inch Nails	Into the Void	CD, Single, Promo
INT8P-6050	Meat Beat Manifesto	Asbestos Lead Asbestos	12", Maxi, Promo
INT8P-6164	Nine Inch Nails	The Perfect Drug - Versions	3x12", Promo
INT8P-6169	Meat Beat Manifesto	Radio Babylon / It's The Music	12", Promo
INT8P-6172	Meat Beat Manifesto	Radio Babylon / I Am Electro	12", Promo
INT8P-6188	Marilyn Manson	The Horrible People / Tourniquet	12", Promo
INT8P-6369	12 Rounds	Pleasant Smell	12"
INT8P-6462	Meat Beat Manifesto	Prime Audio Soup	12", Promo
INT9P-6448	Marilyn Manson	The Dope Show	Cass, Single, Promo
INTC-90079	Pig	Sinsation	Cass
INTC-90086	Marilyn Manson	Antichrist Superstar	Cass
INTD-90079	Pig	Sinsation	CD
INTD-90086	Marilyn Manson	Antichrist Superstar	CD
INTD-90127	Meat Beat Manifesto	Original Fire	CD
INTD-90154	12 Rounds	My Big Hero	CD
INTD-90155	2wo	Voyeurs	CD
INTD-90210	Einstürzende Neubauten	Ende Neu	CD
INTD-90277	Plaid	Not For Threes	CD
INTD-90279	Meat Beat Manifesto	Actual Sounds + Voices	CD
INTD-90294	Squarepusher	Music Is Rotted One Note	CD
INTD-90300	The Bowling Green	One Pound Note	CD
INTD-90312	Squarepusher	Budakhan Mindphone	CD
INTD-90997	Squarepusher	Maximum Priest EP	CD, Maxi
INTD-90998	Plaid	Rest Proof Clockwork	CD
INTD-90258	Autechre	LP5	CD
INTD-90999	Autechre	EP7	CD
INTD-92213	Nine Inch Nails	Broken	CD, Maxi
INTD-92344	Marilyn Manson	Portrait Of An American Family	CD
INTD-92346	Nine Inch Nails	The Downward Spiral	CD
INTD-92641	Marilyn Manson	Smells Like Children	CD
INTD2-90069	Meat Beat Manifesto	Subliminal Sandwich	2xCD
INTD2-90148	Plug	Drum 'n' Bass For Papa + Plug EPs 1, 2 & 3	2xCD
INTDE-90257	Squarepusher	Big Loada	CD, Enh
INTDM-95007	Nine Inch Nails	The Perfect Drug - Versions	CD, Maxi
INTDM-95017	Marilyn Manson	Remix & Repent	CD, Maxi
INTDM-95023	12 Rounds	Pleasant Smell	CD, Maxi
INTDM-95027	Meat Beat Manifesto	Acid Again	CD, Maxi
INTDM-95039	Autechre	Peel Session	CD, Maxi
INTDM-95806	Marilyn Manson	Lunchbox	CD, Maxi
INTDM-95811	Nine Inch Nails	Further Down the Spiral	CD, EP
INTDM-95902	Marilyn Manson	Get Your Gunn	CD, Maxi
INTDM-95938	Nine Inch Nails	March of the Pigs	CD, Maxi
INTDM-97053	Plaid	Peel Session	CD, Maxi
INTDS-95599	Marilyn Manson	The Dope Show Pt. 1	CD, Maxi
INTDS-97026	Nine Inch Nails	The Day the World Went Away	CD, Maxi
INTR-10079-2	Nine Inch Nails	Starsuckers, Inc.	CD, Maxi, Promo
INTR-10215-2	Marilyn Manson	Disposable Teens	CD, Maxi, Promo
INTR-10245-2	Marilyn Manson	Disposable Teens / The Love Song	CD, Maxi, Promo
INTR-10252-2	Marilyn Manson	Working Class Hero	CD, Maxi, Promo
INTR-10292-2	Marilyn Manson	The Fight Song	CD, Single, Promo
INTR-10384-2	Marilyn Manson	The Nobodies	CD, Maxi, Promo
INTR-10675-2	Nine Inch Nails	And All That Could Have Been (Excerpts)	CD, Maxi, Promo
INTR-10949-2	Marilyn Manson	Mobscene	CD, Maxi, Promo
INTR-11414-9	Nine Inch Nails	Collected	DVD, Promo
INTR-11736-1	Nine Inch Nails	Every Day Is Exactly the Same (Remixes By Sam Fog And Carlos D. From Interpol)	12", Promo
INTV2-90157-1	Nine Inch Nails	Closure	2xVHS
INVP-95541	Marilyn Manson	The Beautiful People	10"
INVP-95552	Marilyn Manson	Tourniquet	10"
INVP-95610	Marilyn Manson	The Dope Show	10"
ISC-90150	Marilyn Manson	Dead To The World	VHS
MANSONRX2	Marilyn Manson	This Is The New Shit	CD, Maxi, Promo
MMCDP2	Marilyn Manson	The Fight Song	CD, Maxi, Promo
NEWSHIT1	Marilyn Manson	This Is The New Shit	12", Promo
none	Various	Lost Highway	Cass, Promo
none	Marilyn Manson	This Is The New Shit	CDr, Promo
none	Marilyn Manson	Mobscene	CDr, Promo
none	Plaid	Rest Proof Clockwork	CDr, Promo
none	12 Rounds	Selected New Recordings 2002	CD, Maxi, Promo
none	Marilyn Manson	The Dope Show	CDr, Promo
none	Marilyn Manson	Disposable Teens	CD, Maxi, Promo
none	Marilyn Manson	This Is The New Shit	CDr, Promo
PR 5539	Nine Inch Nails	March of the Pigs	12", Promo
PR 5948	Prick	Communiqué / Crack	7", Promo
PRCD 5697-2	Marilyn Manson	Get Your Gunn	CD, Maxi, Promo
PRCD 5722-2	Marilyn Manson	Get Your Gunn	CD, Maxi, Promo
PRCD 5781-2	Marilyn Manson	Get Your Gunn	CD, Maxi, Promo
PRCD 5961	Marilyn Manson	Lunchbox	CD, Maxi, Promo
PRCD 6240	Prick	Animal	CD, Maxi, Promo
PRCD 6643	Marilyn Manson	Sweet Dreams	CD, Maxi, Promo
PRCD-6517	Marilyn Manson	Dope Hat	CD, Maxi, Promo
SAM 175 CD	Marilyn Manson	I Don't Like The Drugs (But The Drugs Like Me)	CD, Maxi, Promo
SAM 215 CD	Marilyn Manson	The Dope Show	CD, Maxi, Promo
STPR 5509	Nine Inch Nails	The Downward Spiral	2xLP, Promo
