= Fragility Tour =

1999–2000 concert tour by Nine Inch Nails

Fragility
- Tour by Nine Inch Nails
- A promotional poster for Nine Inch Nails' concert in London on November 29, 1999 as part of their Fragility v1.0 tour
- Location: Europe; Japan; Oceania; North America
- Associated album: The Fragile
- Start date: November 14, 1999
- End date: July 9, 2000
- Legs: 2
- No. of shows: 75; 44 in North America; 20 in Europe; 6 in Oceania; 5 in Asia; 2 cancelled

Nine Inch Nails concert chronology
- Self Destruct Tour (1994–96); Fragility Tour (1999–2000); Live: With Teeth Tour (2005–06)

The Fragility Tour was a concert tour in support of industrial rock band Nine Inch Nails' The Fragile album, which took place in late 1999, running until mid-2000, and was broken into two major legs, Fragility v1.0 and Fragility v2.0 respectively. Destinations included Europe, Japan, New Zealand, Australia, and North America.

The tour featured increasingly large production values, including a triptych video display created by contemporary video artist Bill Viola. The images displayed on the triptych focused on storm and water imagery. "I don't want to do the standard 'rock band in a hockey arena' show", said Trent Reznor. "I want to up the par a little bit. I think our stage show has had a lot of thought put into it. It's not like a Korn or Rob Zombie show where they just go into the prop cupboard and pull out as much shit as they can. I hope, when people see our shows, they go, 'Fuck, that was smarter than that Korn tour I saw, but not in a pretentious way – it kicked ass.' On our previous tour the audience was our enemy but, this time around, we're best friends with the audience at the end of shows. Everyone's connected."

Rolling Stone magazine named Fragility v2.0 the best tour of 2000.

The Fragility v2.0 North American leg was filmed and recorded for the live album and double DVD tour documentary And All that Could Have Been, which was released in 2002.

On May 20, 2000, Nine Inch Nails performed their 500th gig (in count) at the Lakewood Amphitheater in Atlanta.

Before several of the later performances, Recoil's 2000 album Liquid was played over the PA system.

On July 9, 2000, the rest of the tour was cancelled due to "band illness". The most notable "illness" was eight days earlier when the band went to London for a concert, and Reznor almost died from a heroin overdose, mistaking the heroin for cocaine, which he was addicted to at the time. He went into and completed rehab in 2001.

== Personnel ==
- Trent Reznor – Lead vocals, guitar, keyboards, bass guitar, Prophet VS
- Robin Finck – Guitar, E-bow, lap steel synthesizer, backup vocals
- Danny Lohner – Bass guitar, guitar, synthesizer, backup vocals
- Charlie Clouser – Synthesizer, theremin, vocoder, backup vocals
- Jerome Dillon – Drums, samples

== Tour legs ==
Locations of the Fragility Tour.
Fragility Tour (the United States)
Fragility Tour (Europe)
Fragility Tour (Oceania)

=== Europe ("Fragility v1.0") ===
==== Typical set list ====
1. "The New Flesh" / "Pinion"
2. "Somewhat Damaged"
3. "Terrible Lie"
4. "Sin"
5. "March of the Pigs"
6. "Piggy"
7. "The Frail"
8. "The Wretched"
9. "No, You Don't"
10. "Gave Up"
11. "La Mer"
12. "The Great Below"
13. "The Way Out Is Through"
14. "Wish"
15. "Into the Void"
16. "Down in It" or "Get Down, Make Love"
17. "Head Like a Hole"
18. "The Day the World Went Away"
19. "Starfuckers, Inc."
20. "Closer"
21. "Hurt"

"Something I Can Never Have" was played once in Europe. "Reptile", "Please" and/or "Even Deeper" were added at some shows.

==== Support act ====
- Atari Teenage Riot

==== Dates ====
Date	City	Country	Venue
November 14, 1999	Barcelona	Spain	Pabellon de la Valle Hebron
November 17, 1999	Milan	Italy	Alcatraz
November 19, 1999	Munich	Germany	Colosseum
November 20, 1999	Vienna	Austria	Libro Music Hall
November 22, 1999	Berlin	Germany	Columbiahalle
November 23, 1999	Copenhagen	Denmark	K.B. Hallen
November 25, 1999	Paris	France	Zénith de Paris
November 26, 1999	Düsseldorf	Germany	Stahlwerk
November 28, 1999	Tilburg	Netherlands	013
November 29, 1999	London	England	Brixton Academy
December 1, 1999	London	England	Brixton Academy

=== Asia ===
==== Typical set list ====
Same as above.

==== Support act ====
- Skingame

==== Dates ====
Date	City	Country	Venue
January 10, 2000	Urayasu	Japan	Tokyo Bay NK Hall
January 11, 2000	Urayasu	Japan	Tokyo Bay NK Hall
January 12, 2000	Urayasu	Japan	Tokyo Bay NK Hall
January 14, 2000	Yokohama	Japan	Pacifico Yokohama
January 15, 2000	Osaka	Japan	Castle Hall

=== Oceania (Big Day Out 2000 festival dates) ===
==== Typical set list ====
These shows featured shorter and more aggressive set lists.

==== Accompanying acts ====
- Red Hot Chili Peppers
- Foo Fighters
- Atari Teenage Riot
- Blink-182
- The Chemical Brothers
- A Perfect Circle

==== Dates ====
Date	City	Country	Venue
January 21, 2000	Auckland	New Zealand	Ericsson Stadium
January 23, 2000	Gold Coast	Australia	Gold Coast Parklands
January 26, 2000	Sydney	Australia	Sydney Showground
January 30, 2000	Melbourne	Australia	Royal Melbourne Showgrounds
February 4, 2000	Adelaide	Australia	Adelaide Showgrounds
February 6, 2000	Perth	Australia	Bassendean Oval

=== North America ("Fragility v2.0") ===
==== Typical set list ====
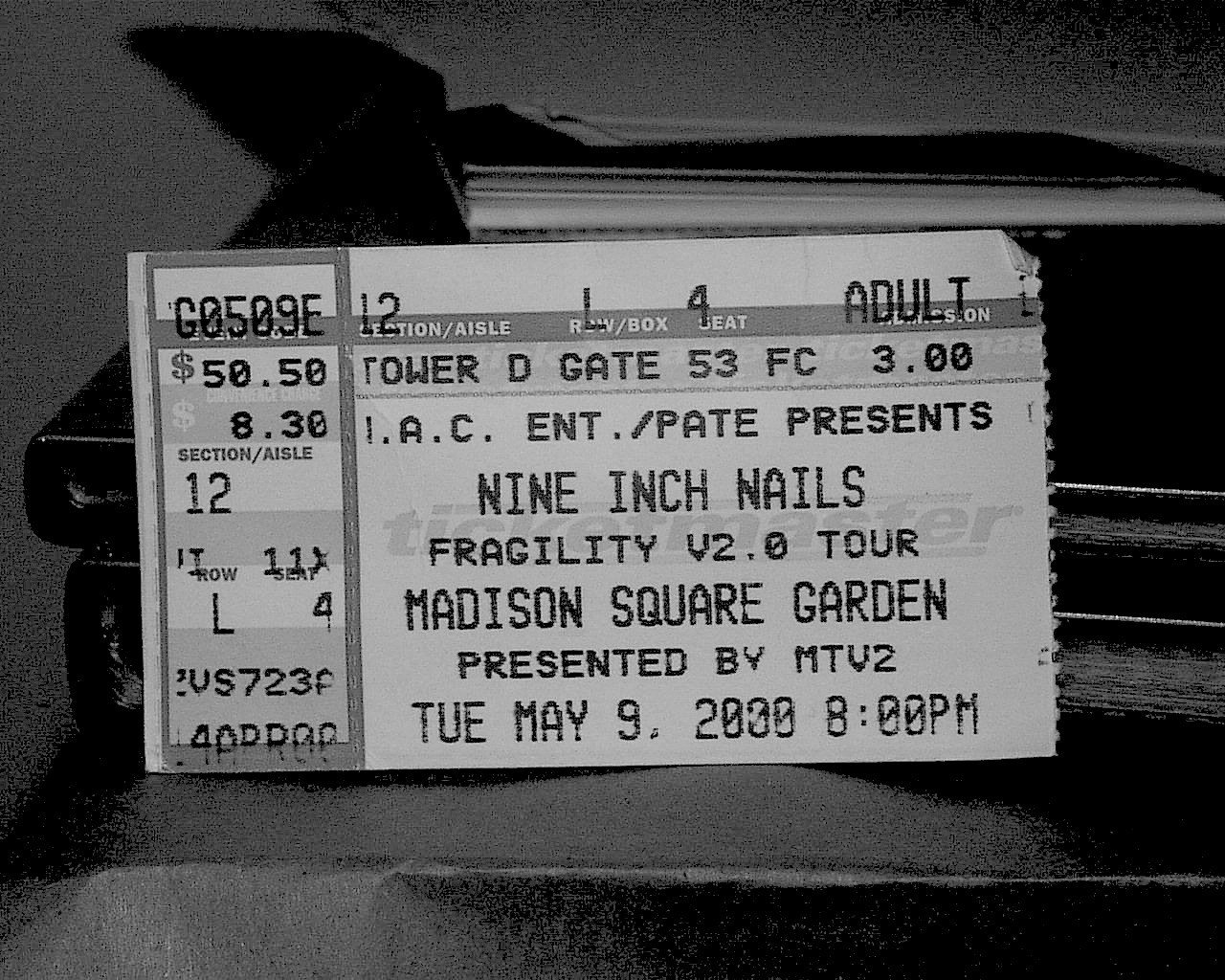
New York ticket

1. "The New Flesh" / "Pinion"
2. "Somewhat Damaged"
3. "Terrible Lie"
4. "Sin"
5. "March of the Pigs"
6. "Piggy"
7. "The Frail"
8. "The Wretched"
9. "Gave Up"
10. "La Mer"
11. "The Great Below"
12. "The Mark Has Been Made"
13. "Wish"
14. "Complication"
15. "Suck"
16. "Closer"
17. "Head Like a Hole"
18. "The Day the World Went Away"
19. "Just Like You Imagined" or "Even Deeper"
20. "Starfuckers, Inc."
21. "Hurt"

"The Big Come Down", "Get Down, Make Love", "Reptile" and "The Fragile" made a number of occasional appearances.

==== Support act ====
- A Perfect Circle

==== Dates ====
Date	City	Country	Venue
April 3, 2000	Los Angeles	United States	Grand Olympic Auditorium
April 12, 2000	Cleveland	United States	CSU Convocation Center
April 14, 2000	Auburn Hills	United States	The Palace of Auburn Hills
April 15, 2000	Columbus	United States	Schottenstein Center
April 17, 2000	Minneapolis	United States	Target Center
April 18, 2000	Milwaukee	United States	U.S. Cellular Arena
April 20, 2000	Indianapolis	United States	Conseco Fieldhouse
April 21, 2000	Chicago	United States	UIC Pavilion
April 22, 2000	Madison	United States	Dane County Expo Center
April 25, 2000	Grand Rapids	United States	Van Andel Arena
April 26, 2000	Chicago	United States	UIC Pavilion
April 28, 2000	Toronto	Canada	Maple Leaf Gardens
April 29, 2000	Buffalo	United States	HSBC Arena
April 30, 2000	Montreal	Canada	Molson Centre
May 2, 2000	Worcester	United States	Centrum Centre
May 3, 2000	Providence	United States	Providence Civic Center
May 4, 2000	Hartford	United States	Hartford Civic Center
May 6, 2000	Philadelphia	United States	First Union Spectrum
May 7, 2000	Burgettstown	United States	Star Lake Amphitheater
May 9, 2000	New York City	United States	Madison Square Garden
May 12, 2000	Columbia	United States	Merriweather Post Pavilion
May 13, 2000	Raleigh	United States	Alltel Pavilion at Walnut Creek
May 14, 2000	Charlotte	United States	Blockbuster Pavilion
May 17, 2000	Miami	United States	Miami Arena
May 18, 2000	Lakeland	United States	Lakeland Center
May 20, 2000	Atlanta	United States	Lakewood Amphitheater
May 22, 2000	Houston	United States	Compaq Center
May 23, 2000	Dallas	United States	Starplex Amphitheater
May 25, 2000	New Orleans	United States	New Orleans Arena
May 27, 2000	Maryland Heights	United States	Riverport Amphitheater
May 28, 2000	Kansas City	United States	Kemper Arena
May 30, 2000	Omaha	United States	Omaha Civic Auditorium
June 2, 2000	Paradise	United States	Thomas & Mack Center
June 3, 2000	San Diego	United States	Cox Arena
June 4, 2000	Phoenix	United States	America West Arena
June 6, 2000	Anaheim	United States	Arrowhead Pond of Anaheim
June 7, 2000	Daly City	United States	Cow Palace
June 9, 2000	George	United States	The Gorge Amphitheatre
June 10, 2000	Portland	United States	Rose Garden Arena
June 12, 2000	Spokane	United States	Spokane Arena
June 13, 2000	Vancouver	Canada	General Motors Place
June 15, 2000	Wheatland	United States	Sacramento Valley Amphitheater
June 17, 2000	West Valley City	United States	E Center
June 18, 2000	Denver	United States	Pepsi Center

=== Europe (Festival dates) ===
==== Typical set list ====
These shows featured shorter and more aggressive set lists.

==== Dates ====
Date	City	Country	Venue
June 23, 2000	Somerset	England	Glastonbury Festival
June 24, 2000	Scheeßel	Germany	Hurricane Festival
June 25, 2000	Tuttlingen	Germany	Southside Festival
June 29, 2000	Roskilde	Denmark	Roskilde Festival
June 30, 2000	Werchter	Belgium	Rock Werchter
July 4, 2000	Kristiansand	Norway	Quart Festival
July 7, 2000	Belfort	France	Eurockéennes
July 8, 2000	Wiesen	Austria	Forestglade Festival
July 9, 2000	Monza	Italy	Monza Rock Festival

== Canceled dates ==
Date	City	Country	Venue	Note
May 10, 2000	Uniondale	United States	Nassau Coliseum	
July 1, 2000	London	England	London Arena	Date canceled due to "band illness".
