= Fragilité =

Fragilité (French for 'fragility') may refer to:

- Fragilité, a 1906 composition by Scriabin
- Fragilité (ballet), a 1927 dance solo based on Scirabin's composition
- Fragilité, ton nom est femme, a 1965 film by Nadine Trintignant
- Fragilité, a Danish cake consisting of meringue layers around a buttercream filling
