= Frágil =

Frágil may refer to:

- Frágil (band), a Peruvian rock band, or their self-titled album
- "Frágil" (Allison song), 2006
- "Frágil" (Yahritza y su Esencia and Grupo Frontera song), 2023
- Frágil, a 2003 album by Ana Torroja
- "Frágil", a 2002 song by Líbido from Pop*Porn

== See also ==
- Fragile (disambiguation)
