= Fragile =

Fragile or The Fragile may refer to:

== Film and television ==
- Fragile (film), a 2005 film by Jaume Balagueró
- "Fragile" (Smallville), a television episode
- Fragile (TV series), an upcoming South Korean television series

== Literature ==
- Fragile (manga), a Japanese manga series by Bin Kusamizu and Saburō Megumi
- Fragile (novel), a 2010 novel by Lisa Unger
- Fragile, a 2003–2004 comics series by Stefano Raffaele

== Music ==
- Fragile Records, an American record label

=== Albums ===
- Fragile (Cherrelle album), 1984
- Fragile (Dead or Alive album), 2000
- Fragile (Junko Onishi album), 1998
- Fragile (Midge Ure album) or the title song, 2014
- Fragile (Yes album), 1971
- Fragile, by Eaeon, 2021
- Fragile, by Saron Gas, now known as Seether, 2000
- The Fragile or the title song, by Nine Inch Nails, 1999
- The Fragile (O'Hooley & Tidow album), 2012

=== Songs ===
- "Fragile" (Every Little Thing song), 2001
- "Fragile" (Kygo and Labrinth song), 2016
- "Fragile" (Madonna song), 2026
- "Fragile" (Namewee song), 2021
- "Fragile" (Sting song), 1988
- "Fragile" (Tech N9ne song), 2013
- "Fragile", by Cameron Whitcomb from The Hard Way, 2025
- "Fragile", by Ecco2k from E, 2019
- "Fragile", by God Is an Astronaut from All Is Violent, All Is Bright, 2005
- "Fragile", by Kerli from Love Is Dead, 2008
- "Fragile", by Kylie Minogue from Fever, 2001
- "Fragile", by Lacuna Coil from Karmacode, 2006
- "Fragile", by October Tide from A Thin Shell, 2010
- "Fragile", by Prince Fox, 2016
- "Fragile", by Paul Rodgers from Cut Loose, 1983
- "Fragile", by Sentenced from Crimson, 2000
- "Fragile", by Swallow the Sun from Ghosts of Loss, 2005
- "Fragile", by X Ambassadors from Townies, 2024

== Other uses ==
- Fragile: Farewell Ruins of the Moon, a 2009 video game by Namco Bandai
- Fragile, a women's fragrance by Jean Paul Gaultier
- Fragile States Index (FSI; formerly the Failed States Index), index aiming to assess states' vulnerability to conflict or collapse

== See also ==
- Brittleness
- Software brittleness
- Fragility (disambiguation)
