= 12 Rounds =

12 Rounds may refer to:

- 12 Rounds (band)
- 12 Rounds (film)
