= Fragility =

Fragility may refer to:

- A property of a solid, related to brittleness
- Fragility (glass physics), a concept to characterize viscous slow down during glass formation
- Fragility (film), a 2016 Swedish documentary
- Fragility Tour, a 1999 concert tour by Nine Inch Nails
- Financial fragility, the vulnerability of a financial system to a financial crisis
- White fragility, defensive responses by white people to racial stress

== See also ==
- Fragility Index, in medical literature, a statistical metric used to assess test results
- Fragile States Index, an annual report assessing states' vulnerability to conflict or collapse
- Antifragility, a property of systems in which they increase in capability to thrive as a result of stressors
