= Just Like You Imagined =

Nine Inch Nails song

Song by Nine Inch Nails

from the album The Fragile
- Released: September 21, 1999
- Recorded: Nothing Studios; New Orleans, Louisiana, U.S.
- Length: 3:49
- Label: Nothing Records
- Songwriter: Trent Reznor
- Producers: Trent Reznor, Alan Moulder

"Just Like You Imagined" is an instrumental by Nine Inch Nails from their 1999 album The Fragile.

It features Mike Garson on piano, who is known for his work with David Bowie and The Smashing Pumpkins. Additional layers of guitars are performed by Danny Lohner and Adrian Belew. There is a thick fuzz texture to some of the guitar tracks, while others trigger synth patches rather than traditional guitar sounds. The song's time signature is 4/4 in the intro but once the drums enter it changes to 10/4 (4 + 6).

A live video of "Just Like You Imagined" appears on the DVD version of And All That Could Have Been, with some of Garson's technically challenging piano tracks substituted by a theremin played by Charlie Clouser. There is a video of live rehearsal footage at Nothing Studios in New Orleans from 2000 on the Nine Inch Nails website. The song was played during the encore in the Fragility tour.

In 2013, Rolling Stone rated "Just Like You Imagined" as the 25th best rock instrumental of all time.

== In popular culture ==
- The song was used in trailers for the 2007 film 300.
- The song was used as background music in the Japanese reality show Terrace House: Boys × Girls Next Door.
- It was used by Electronic Arts in one of the promotional trailers of the 2011 first-person shooter, Crysis 2.
