= Fragility Index =

Statistical metric

The fragility index is a statistical metric used primarily in the medical literature to assess study results. It denotes the minimum number of subjects whose status would have to change from a non-event to an event in order to convert a statistically significant result of the study into a non-significant result. The smaller the fragility index, the more fragile the result of the study.

== Derivation ==
The result of scientific studies is said to be statistically significant if the calculated probability of a type I error (assumption of a correlation that does not really exist) is below the arbitrarily chosen but generally accepted limit of 5%. Study results that meet these significance criteria can be published more easily and in more highly ranked journals (publication bias).

The sole consideration of the significance level for the assessment of study results is increasingly considered questionable (see also Problems with the Interpretation of Statistical Significance). The fragility index describes the extent to which the attribution of statistical significance is subject to random influences. It indicates the number of patients or subjects whose results would have to change in order to alter the statistical interpretation of the study. The Fragility Index applies only to studies that examine dichotomous outcomes (deceased/surviving, cured/not cured).

== Importance ==
In a review of 56 intensive care studies with a significant mortality outcome, a median Fragility Index of 2 was calculated, and in 40% of the studies it was 0 or 1. That is, in at least half of the studies examined, it would have been sufficient for 2 patients to have had a different outcome such that the result of the study would no longer have been considered significant. In 12.5% of the studies examined, the fragility index was smaller than the number of patients with no follow-up data available (lost to follow-up). Thus, it is quite possible that a more complete data collection would have nullified the significant result.

This problem of fragility is discussed especially in the intensive care literature. This is attributed, among other things, to the fact that the patient numbers in these studies are necessarily small. However, this problem of fragility of study results has also been described in other areas of medicine.
