= Things Falling Apart =

Remix album by Nine Inch Nails
- Released: November 21, 2000
- Recorded: 1999–2000
- Genres: Post-industrial; industrial rock; electronica; glitch; experimental
- Length: 53:22
- Labels: Nothing; Interscope
- Producers: Trent Reznor; Joshua Eustis; Danny Lohner; Adrian Sherwood; Mark Stewart; Charles Cooper; Turk Dietrich

Nine Inch Nails chronology
The Fragile (1999)	Things Falling Apart (2000)	And All That Could Have Been (2002)

Halo numbers chronology
Halo 15 (1999)	Halo 16 (2000)	Halo 17 (2002)

Professional ratings
Review scores
Source	Rating
AllMusic	1.5/5 stars
Drowned in Sound	6/10
NME	10/10 (sarcastically)
Pitchfork	0.4/10
Rolling Stone	2.5/5 stars

Things Falling Apart is the second remix album by the American industrial rock band Nine Inch Nails, released by Nothing Records and Interscope Records on November 21, 2000. It is the companion remix disc to the band's third studio album, The Fragile. The U.S. promotional CD single for "Into the Void" is also labeled as "Halo 16". "10 Miles High" is the only song that was a B-side to a Nine Inch Nails single to be included on the album, though the version on this release differs from the album/B-side version. It was only released on the vinyl version of The Fragile, while appearing as a B-side to the band's 1999 single "We're in This Together".

Unlike The Fragile, which received mostly positive reviews, Things Falling Apart was critically panned by reviewers and even received a sarcastic rating of 10/10 from NME.

== Track listing ==
All songs written by Trent Reznor, except where noted.

=== CD ===
No.	Title	Writer(s)	Manipulator(s)	Length
1.	"Slipping Away"		Reznor; Alan Moulder	6:11
2.	"The Great Collapse"		Reznor; Moulder	4:42
3.	"The Wretched" (version)		Keith Hillebrandt	5:52
4.	"Starfuckers, Inc." (version)	Reznor; Charlie Clouser	Adrian Sherwood	5:11
5.	"The Frail" (version)		Benelli	2:47
6.	"Starfuckers, Inc." (version)	Reznor; Clouser	Dave Ogilvie	6:06
7.	"Where Is Everybody?" (version)		Danny Lohner; Telefon Tel Aviv	5:07
8.	"Metal"	Gary Numan	Reznor; Moulder	7:05
9.	"10 Miles High" (version)		Hillebrandt	5:11
10.	"Starfuckers, Inc." (version)	Reznor; Clouser	Clouser	5:09
Total length:				53:22

Notes

- The digital release is identical to the CD version, except each track is cut off by one second, affecting the seamless flow between several tracks.

=== 12" vinyl ===
Side A
No.	Title	Manipulator(s)	Length
1.	"Slipping Away"	Reznor; Moulder	6:11
2.	"The Great Collapse"	Reznor; Moulder	4:43

Side B
No.	Title	Writer(s)	Manipulator(s)	Length
1.	"The Wretched" (version)		Hillebrandt	5:52
2.	"Starfuckers, Inc." (version)	Reznor; Clouser	Sherwood	5:12

Side C
No.	Title	Writer(s)	Manipulator(s)	Length
1.	"The Frail" (version)		Benelli	2:47
2.	"Starfuckers, Inc." (version)	Reznor; Clouser	Ogilvie	6:06
3.	"10 Miles High" (version)		Hillebrandt	5:12

Side D
No.	Title	Writer(s)	Manipulator(s)	Length
1.	"Metal"	Numan	Reznor; Moulder	7:05
2.	"Where Is Everybody?" (version)		Lohner; Telefon Tel Aviv	5:07
3.	"Starfuckers, Inc." (version)	Reznor; Clouser	Clouser	5:09

== Charts ==
Chart (2000)	Peak position
Australian Albums (ARIA)	59
Japanese Albums (Oricon)	73
Scottish Albums (Official Charts)	85
UK Albums (Official Charts)	98
UK Rock & Metal Albums (Official Charts)	6
US Billboard 200	67
