= The Perfect Drug =

Nine Inch Nails song

Single by Nine Inch Nails

from the album Lost Highway Soundtrack
- Released: May 13, 1997
- Recorded: Mid–late 1996
- Genre: Industrial pop
- Length: 5:42
- Label: Nothing; Interscope
- Songwriters: Trent Reznor; Charlie Clouser; Danny Lohner; Chris Vrenna
- Producer: Trent Reznor

Nine Inch Nails singles chronology
"Closer" (1994)	"The Perfect Drug" (1997)	"The Day the World Went Away" (1999)

Halo numbers chronology
Halo 10 (1995)	Halo 11 (1997)	Halo 12 (1997)

"The Perfect Drug" is a song by Nine Inch Nails written for the David Lynch film Lost Highway. It was released in 1997 on the Lost Highway soundtrack and as a single from the score. Remixes of the song were released as an EP called "The Perfect Drug" Versions, on which the original version does not appear.

The track has also been included on international singles "We're in This Together, Part 3" and "Into the Void" without the truncated ending; the only audio release of it in North America was on the Lost Highway soundtrack. A music video for the song, directed by Mark Romanek, was included with the VHS compilation Closure and in The Work of Director Mark Romanek.

Initially regarded by Reznor as his least favorite work, the song was noted among Nine Inch Nails fans for his refusal to perform it at concerts, until it finally made its live debut after more than two decades at Red Rocks Amphitheatre in September 2018.

== Overview ==
"The Perfect Drug" was described by Entertainment Weekly as a "drum and bass-infused industrial pop song". The Guardian also noted the drum and bass influence in the song. In May 2004, a fan posted on the band's website to ask whether the track had not been performed live because "the drum solo would make Jerome's arms fall off". Then-drummer Jerome Dillon replied that they "never rule out the possibility of playing any of the songs live".

In April 2005, while guest-hosting an episode of the British late-night Rock Show on BBC Radio 1, Nine Inch Nails frontman Trent Reznor answered questions sent in by fans. When asked to name which of his works he was least satisfied with and why, he responded:

The only thing I think I really don't like that much is "The Perfect Drug" song. It was one of those things where you have a week to do a track for a movie. The mindset that you kind of adapt in that situation—or I did—was, "Let's go in and experiment and see what happens [and] whatever comes out of it, it's not the end of the world." And I think what came out of it, married with a bloated, over-budget video, feels like the least [likely] thing that I would play to somebody if they said, "Play me, y'know, the top hundred songs you've written." That probably wouldn't be in the top hundred. I'm not cringing about it, but it's not my favorite piece.

Despite being released as a single, "The Perfect Drug" was not performed live by Nine Inch Nails until September 2018, more than 21 years after its release.

== Music video ==
A significant aspect to the music video's visuals were the additions of a flashing green light in countless shots accompanied by the song's drum breakdown.

A music video for the single was directed by Mark Romanek and released on January 18, 1997. The theme was inspired by the illustrations of 20th-century artist Edward Gorey, with familiar Gorey elements including oversized urns and glum, pale characters in full Edwardian costume. The most obvious reference to Gorey is the boy sitting on a cushion in front of a painting. Other references include an unidentified painting resembling Gustav Klimt's The Kiss (1907–1908) and a "Scanning Machine" designed by Frenchman François Willème in 1860.

Charlie Clouser, Danny Lohner, and Chris Vrenna also appear in the video, most notably playing string instruments at the beginning of the video. The first half of the video was filmed with a blue tint, switching to a flashing green light during the drum breakdown and reverting to blue for the remainder of the song. Joanne Gair's work with Nine Inch Nails on "The Perfect Drug" won her the makeup portion of the award for best hair/makeup in a music video at the Music Video Production Awards. Visualist Ash Beck vfx supervised and designed the visual effects.

== EP ==
"The Perfect Drug" Versions is the eleventh official Nine Inch Nails release and consists of five remixes of the song "The Perfect Drug". The European, Australian, and Japanese releases append the original version of the song, while a promotional vinyl set adds an exclusive sixth remix, by Aphrodite.

=== Track listing ===
Available as United States, Australia, Japan or EU single.

No.	Title	Length
1.	"The Perfect Drug" (Remixed by Meat Beat Manifesto)	7:24
2.	"The Perfect Drug" (Remixed by Plug)	6:53
3.	"The Perfect Drug" (Remixed by Nine Inch Nails)	8:19
4.	"The Perfect Drug" (Remixed by Spacetime Continuum)	5:42
5.	"The Perfect Drug" (Remixed by The Orb)	6:12
6.	"The Perfect Drug (Original Version)" (Non-US releases only)	5:16
Total length:		39:46

== Charts ==
=== Weekly charts ===
Weekly chart performance for "The Perfect Drug"
Chart (1997)	Peak position
Australia (ARIA)	48
Canada (Nielsen SoundScan)	2
Canada Rock/Alternative (RPM)	2
Denmark (Tracklisten)	13
Finland (Suomen virallinen lista)	7
Hungary (Mahasz)	9
New Zealand (Recorded Music NZ)	32
Scottish Singles Sales (Official Charts)	34
Sweden (Sverigetopplistan)	48
UK Singles (Official Charts)	43
US Billboard Hot 100	46
US Mainstream Rock (Billboard)	21
US Alternative Airplay (Billboard)	11

=== Year-end charts ===
Chart (2001)	Position
Canada (Nielsen SoundScan)	89

Year-end chart performance for The Perfect Drug EP
Chart (2002)	Position
Canada (Nielsen SoundScan)	98

== Cover versions and samples ==
In 2002, American post-hardcore band the Blood Brothers sampled the song in their song "Kiss of the Octopus". American deathcore band Fit for an Autopsy covered the song for the split EP The Depression Sessions in 2016.

== In media ==
In January 2023, the song was licensed for the game Hi-Fi Rush and was featured as the theme for the final boss fight against Kale Vandelay.
