= Jerome Dillon =

American drummer

- Born: July 16, 1969 (age 57); Columbus, Ohio, U.S.
- Genres: Hard rock; industrial rock; alternative rock; pop rock; ambient; electronica
- Occupations: Musician; songwriter; composer; producer; remixer
- Instruments: Drums; guitar
- Years active: 1996–present
- Labels: Columbia; Interscope; Nothing; Infernal; Kufala; La Cosa Nostra; Cooking Vinyl; Metropolis; Synthellec; RCA
- Formerly of: Nine Inch Nails; Howlin' Maggie

Jerome Dillon (born July 16, 1969) is an American musician, best known for his tenure as the drummer and occasional guitarist of the industrial rock band Nine Inch Nails from 1999 to 2005.

== History ==
Dillon was born July 16, 1969, in Columbus, Ohio and attended St. Francis DeSales and Northland High School until 1987.

In 1994, he joined Ohio-based pop-rock band Howlin' Maggie and performed with the group until July 1998, when he parted ways with the group and moved to Los Angeles. Later that year, while visiting family in Columbus, Dillon was advised by Howlin' Maggie's then manager, Sheila Scott, to audition for Nine Inch Nails after the departure of long-time drummer and collaborator Chris Vrenna. Dillon submitted a sample of his work, and was thereafter invited to audition for the group's frontman, Trent Reznor, in New Orleans.

Two weeks after the audition, Dillon was asked to meet with the group. "I thought it was going to be the same thing all over again," he told the Columbus Dispatch. "Instead, I walked in and it was more of just a conversation with me and the band. Trent liked where I was coming from musically, and thought it was conducive to the direction of the new record." Hired as the group's drummer, Dillon subsequently played on tours supporting The Fragile and With Teeth, the latter of which he played on in the studio. Dillon also contributed drums and guitar to several other releases,Things Falling Apart and Still. He can also be heard on the live album And All That Could Have Been. His last appearance with the band was at the Hollywood Bowl in Los Angeles on October 1, 2005.

After leaving Nine Inch Nails, Dillon released the debut album of his solo project Nearly, entitled reminder, in December 2005. The song "Straight to Nowhere" from the album was released as a maxi-single and "All is Lost", which was co-written with 12 Rounds singer Claudia Sarne, was featured in the 2008 film Diary of a Nymphomaniac. In addition, an authorized limited release live bootleg EP/DVD entitled reminder Live 2006, was released in August 2006. Dillon has also worked as a composer for feature films since 2001.

== Discography ==
=== Nearly ===
- reminder (2005)
- Straight to Nowhere, CD maxi-single (2005)
- reminder Live, 8 Track live CD/DVD, no longer available (2006)

=== Records featuring Jerome Dillon ===
- Honeysuckle Strange (Howlin' Maggie, 1996)
- EdgeFest 96 Live (Various Artists, 1996)
- The Fragile (Nine Inch Nails album), 1999)
- Things Falling Apart (Nine Inch Nails, 2000)
- Cecil B. Demented OST (2000)
- And All That Could Have Been DVD, cd (Nine Inch Nails, 2002)
- Still (Nine Inch Nails, 2002)
- With Teeth (Nine Inch Nails, 2005)
- Amber Headlights (Greg Dulli, 2005)
- Jagged (Gary Numan, 2006)
- Beside You in Time (Nine Inch Nails, 2007)

=== Soundtrack ===
- Cecil B. Demented, soundtrack (RCA Records 2000)
- Bully, composer (Lions Gate Films 2001)
- Vacancy 2: The First Cut, composer (Sony Pictures, Screen Gems 2008)
- The Collector, composer (Liddell Entertainment, Fortress Features 2009)
- For The Love of Money, composer (All Cash Productions 2011)
- No One Lives, composer (WWE, Pathe 2013)
- Officer Down, composer (Most Films 2013)
- Bleed, composer (Spitfire Productions 2014)
- The Green Fairy, composer (Upward Rising Development 2016)

=== Further appearances ===
- And All That Could Have Been DVD (Nine Inch Nails, 2002)
- arhythmiA: Drums & Drones (CD-ROM, Sony, 2004)
- Android Lust – The Human Animal ("God in the Hole" remix) (Synthellec Music 2010)
