= Lost Highway (soundtrack) =

Lost Highway Soundtrack

Soundtrack album by Various artists
- Released: February 18, 1997
- Genres: Industrial rock; industrial metal
- Length: 71:57
- Labels: Nothing; Interscope
- Producer: Trent Reznor

Trent Reznor chronology
Natural Born Killers (1994)	Lost Highway (1997)	The Social Network (2010)

Singles from Lost Highway Soundtrack
- 1. "Apple of Sodom" Released: February 18, 1997; 2. "The Perfect Drug" Released: May 13, 1997; 3. "Eye" Released: 1997

Professional ratings
Review scores
Source	Rating
AllMusic	3/5 stars
The A.V. Club	Favorable
Entertainment Weekly	A
Pitchfork Media	5.2/10

Lost Highway is the soundtrack album for the 1997 David Lynch film of the same name. It was produced by Trent Reznor of Nine Inch Nails, and includes original music from the film recorded by Reznor, Angelo Badalamenti and Barry Adamson, as well as songs by other artists used in the film. The album reached No. 7 on the Billboard 200 and reached Gold status in the United States and Platinum in Canada. The album was re-released on vinyl in November 2016 by Dutch label Music On Vinyl.

== Background ==
At the suggestion of a mutual friend, David Lynch chose Trent Reznor of Nine Inch Nails to produce the soundtrack to his film Lost Highway (1997). Lynch wanted the soundtrack to feature well-known artists of his choosing who were inspirational to him, as well as commercially viable. Among the artists chosen were Marilyn Manson, Nine Inch Nails, David Bowie, Lou Reed, The Smashing Pumpkins and Rammstein.

When deciding the album's musical direction, Reznor came to the conclusion that it should appeal to fans of Lynch who hate pop music; at the same time, he wanted it to "have some degree of accessibility for the 13-, 14-year-old kid who buys it because I have a new song on it; or for the Smashing Pumpkins fan who buys it for that."

== Track listing ==
No.	Title	Artist	Length
1.	"I'm Deranged" (edit)	David Bowie	2:37
2.	"Videodrones; Questions"	Trent Reznor featuring Peter Christopherson	0:44
3.	"The Perfect Drug"	Nine Inch Nails	5:16
4.	"Red Bats with Teeth"	Angelo Badalamenti	2:57
5.	"Haunting & Heartbreaking"	Angelo Badalamenti	2:09
6.	"Eye"	The Smashing Pumpkins	4:51
7.	"Dub Driving"	Angelo Badalamenti	3:43
8.	"Mr. Eddy's Theme 1"	Barry Adamson	3:31
9.	"This Magic Moment"	Lou Reed	3:23
10.	"Mr. Eddy's Theme 2"	Barry Adamson	2:13
11.	"Fred & Renee Make Love"	Angelo Badalamenti	2:04
12.	"Apple of Sodom"	Marilyn Manson	4:26
13.	"Insensatez"	Antônio Carlos Jobim	2:53
14.	"Something Wicked This Way Comes" (edit)	Barry Adamson	2:54
15.	"I Put a Spell on You"	Marilyn Manson	3:30
16.	"Fats Revisited"	Angelo Badalamenti	2:31
17.	"Fred's World"	Angelo Badalamenti	5:24
18.	"Rammstein" (edit)	Rammstein	3:26
19.	"Hollywood Sunset"	Barry Adamson	2:01
20.	"Heirate Mich" (edit)	Rammstein	3:02
21.	"Police"	Angelo Badalamenti	1:40
22.	"Driver Down"	Trent Reznor	5:18
23.	"I'm Deranged" (edit)	David Bowie	3:48
Total length:			74:21

== Charts ==
Chart (2026)	Peak position
Greek Albums (IFPI)	98

== Certifications ==
Region	Certification	Certified units/sales
Canada (Music Canada)	Platinum	100,000^{^}
United States (RIAA)	Gold	500,000^{^}
^{^} Shipments figures based on certification alone.

== Notes ==
- "Song to the Siren" by This Mortal Coil is used in the film, but was not included on the soundtrack album.
- Additional production on "Videodrones; Questions" and "Driver Down" by Peter Christopherson.
- The songs which have been edited for the soundtrack can be heard as originally recorded on the following albums:
  - David Bowie: "I'm Deranged" from Outside (1995).
  - Barry Adamson: "Something Wicked This Way Comes" from Oedipus Schmoedipus (1996).
  - Rammstein: "Rammstein" and "Heirate Mich" from Herzeleid (1995).
  - Marilyn Manson: "I Put a Spell on You" from Smells Like Children (1995).
