= We're in This Together (Nine Inch Nails song) =

1999 Nine Inch Nails song

Single by Nine Inch Nails

from the album The Fragile
- Released: September 27, 1999
- Genre: Industrial rock; alternative rock
- Length: 7:16 (album version); 5:18 (single version)
- Label: Nothing
- Songwriter: Trent Reznor
- Producers: Trent Reznor; Alan Moulder

Nine Inch Nails singles chronology
"The Day the World Went Away" (1999)	"We're in This Together" (1999)	"Starfuckers, Inc." (1999)

Halo numbers chronology
Halo 14 (1999)	Halo 15 (1999)	Halo 16 (2000)

Additional covers
- Disc 2

Alternative cover
- Disc 3

Alternative cover
- Promo

"We're in This Together" is a song by industrial rock band Nine Inch Nails released in 1999. It is the 15th official Nine Inch Nails release and is a single for the album The Fragile. It was released as a three-disc single (also known as a "triple single").

== Background ==
According to The Fragile contributor Keith Hillebrandt, "the whole song started from something [Reznor] actually played at the end of another track ... he wrote it up into an entirely new song".

The lyrics seem to be inspired by David Bowie's song "'Heroes'" from the same-named 1977 album, such as with the line "You're the queen and I'm the king" and describing two people trying to fight against an ominous and seemingly unstoppable force. Bowie, who is recognized as one of Reznor's greatest influences, is given a special thanks credit in the liner notes of The Fragile.

MTV's Gil Kaufman described the song as "a seven-minute-plus cathartic pop song with somewhat hopeful lyrics over a plodding hip-hop beat, walls of distorted guitars and an eerie slasher-film cricket sound".

Both "10 Miles High" and "The New Flesh" originally appeared on the vinyl version of The Fragile.

The song was featured in the first official teaser trailer for Marvel Studios film The Avengers.

The song peaked at #21 on the US Mainstream Rock Billboard. Despite being one of the band's most popular songs, the band has only played it live five times, all during the Performance 2007 Tour.

== Music video ==
Reznor in the music video

The song's music video was directed by Mark Pellington and released on August 27, 1999. An extended version of the video has since surfaced. Trent Reznor and a large group of black-clothed men are seen running down empty streets, onto a train, and into a field. There are also shots of several elderly people, and a brief scene with a young woman.

The video was filmed in Guadalajara, Jalisco, Mexico and in the dry lake of Sayula.

== Release and reception ==
"We're in This Together" was released on a three-part single, which was only available in Europe and Japan; it was not released in the United States. Two radio promos (the first with the album mix and radio edit of the song, the second with just a unique short edit of the song) were released in America as Halo 15 as well.

AllMusic critic Christian Huey has reviewed the single release, describing the title track as a "strong song" and "different turn for [Reznor] emotionally" while stating that "this adrenaline-infused, white noise territory was mined to even better effect on "Wish." Huey also criticized the three part single release, particularly referring to the orange disk as "the least substantial and the most redundant of the bunch" and "a tired repackaging of material." Spin reviewer Ann Powers referred to the song as "a sweet pop tune encased within the armor of industrial rock."

The track was listed as number 19 on Spin's list of the 69 Best Alternative Rock Songs of 1999. Critic Christopher R. Weingarten has stated: "Though the anthemic chorus borders on 'hit single,' the song still grinds with crunchy noise, whining guitars and a trash-can-sounding snare drum."

== Track listing ==
Disc 1 (Orange)
No.	Title	Length
1.	"We're in This Together" (Radio edit)	5:18
2.	"The Day the World Went Away" (Quiet)	6:19
3.	"The Day the World Went Away" (Porter Ricks mix)	7:04
Total length:		18:41

Disc 2 (Green)
No.	Title	Length
1.	"We're in This Together"	7:16
2.	"10 Miles High"	5:13
3.	"The New Flesh"	3:40
Total length:		16:09

Disc 3 (Yellow)
No.	Title	Length
1.	"We're in This Together"	7:16
2.	"Complications of the Flesh"	6:36
3.	"The Perfect Drug"	5:42
Total length:		19:34

US two-track promotional
No.	Title	Length
1.	"We're in This Together" (Radio edit)	5:14
2.	"We're in This Together" (LP version)	7:16
Total length:		12:30

US one-track promotional
No.	Title	Length
1.	"We're in This Together" (Short radio edit)	4:20

== Personnel ==
- Trent Reznor – writing, performance, and production
- Charlie Clouser – programming
- Jerome Dillon - chorus drums
- Alan Moulder – production, engineering, mixing
- Porter Ricks – remixing
- Danny Lohner – remixing on "Complications of the Flesh"
- David Carson – design and photography

== Charts ==
=== Weekly charts ===
Weekly chart performance for "We're in This Together"
Chart (1999–2000)	Peak position
Australia (ARIA) Double A-side with "Into the Void"	72
Scottish Singles Sales (Official Charts)	37
UK Singles (Official Charts)	39
US Alternative Airplay (Billboard)	11
US Mainstream Rock Airplay (Billboard)	21

=== Year-end charts ===
2001 year-end chart performance for "We're in This Together"
Chart (2001)	Position
Canada (Nielsen SoundScan)	114

2002 year-end chart performance for "We're in This Together"
Chart	Position
Canada (Nielsen SoundScan)	197
