= Starfuckers, Inc. =

1999 promotional single by Nine Inch Nails

Promotional single by Nine Inch Nails

from the album The Fragile
- Released: 1999
- Genre: Industrial metal; breakbeat
- Length: 5:00
- Label: Nothing
- Songwriters: Trent Reznor; Charlie Clouser
- Producers: Trent Reznor; Alan Moulder

Nine Inch Nails singles chronology
"We're in This Together" (1999)	"Starfuckers, Inc." (1999)	"Into the Void" (2000)

"Starfuckers, Inc." (known as "Starsuckers, Inc." in its censored form) is a song by American industrial rock band Nine Inch Nails from their third studio album The Fragile. Although the song does not have an official halo (the numbering system used by Nine Inch Nails for each release), an edited single was distributed with exclusive radio edits and a video for the song was produced.

== Background ==
Written by Trent Reznor and Charlie Clouser, "Starfuckers, Inc." is one of the heaviest songs on The Fragile. The chorus is built on heavy metal guitars and choruses shouted by a crowd. The verses feature breakbeats, deep bass hits, and glitchy vocals. The outro introduces more synthesizers, distortion, and sound effects.

"Starfuckers, Inc." deals with the self-involved vanity and shallow commercialization of fame. The song directly references "You're So Vain", Carly Simon's ode to a self-absorbed lover, by quoting the chorus:

You're so vain
I bet you think this song is about you
Don't you?

These lyrics were changed for the video version of "Starsuckers, Inc." to:

Overplayed
And soon you'll make us forget about you
Won't you?

The lyrics are speculated to be directed towards Marilyn Manson and Courtney Love. In a 2017 interview on The Howard Stern Show, Manson openly claimed that Reznor wrote the song about him after a heated incident between the two. "When I wrote the song," Reznor confirmed in 2000, "he was definitely one of the people I had in mind."

"If certain people do certain things, which cross a line of what is decent, I don't deal with them anymore," Reznor observed in 1999. "With Manson, that line has been crossed. He said some very ignorant, mean, malicious things … On that tour, I was peripherally involved as an observer, and suddenly I'm pictured as the ringleader."

When Manson's assertion that he had sexually assaulted a heavily intoxicated woman from his 1998 autobiography resurfaced in 2021, Reznor asserted, "I have been vocal over the years about my dislike of Manson as a person and cut ties with him nearly 25 years ago. As I said at the time, the passage from Manson’s memoir is a complete fabrication. I was infuriated and offended back when it came out and remain so today."

Despite Reznor's claim, they renewed their friendship enough for Manson to co-direct and appear in the "Starfuckers" music video in 1999, and in 2000 Reznor described his time working on the video together, "it just felt really good to see the guy again and hang out. I reluctantly missed him. We were like brothers and I couldn't even tell you why we fell out. It was something to do with him getting some fame and both of us being out of our minds."

The word "Starfucker" may have been taken from The Rolling Stones' song "Star Star" (original title "Starfucker"), which appeared on their 1973 album Goats Head Soup, or more likely from the song "Professional Widow"—also rumoured to be about Love—by Tori Amos, to whom Reznor was close prior to what he refers to as "some malicious meddling on the part of [Love]".

The song was nominated for the Grammy Award for Best Metal Performance in 2000, but lost to Black Sabbath's live rendition of "Iron Man".

== Release ==
"Starsuckers, Inc." was released as a promotional three-track CD in the United States. It contains the original track, a radio edit in which the word "starfuckers" is replaced by the less-profane "Starsuckers", and the audio of the "Starsuckers, Inc." video with additional changes in lyrics. Its Nothing Records catalog number is INTR-10079-2.

An extended version of "Starfuckers, Inc." was also included as a B-side to the first single from The Fragile, "The Day the World Went Away".

== Music video ==
The music video version, "Starsuckers, Inc." was co-directed by Robert Hales and Marilyn Manson, and revolves around the same themes as the song, albeit in a darkly ironic manner. Under cover of darkness, Reznor and a blonde woman ride in a limousine to a deserted carnival park. With the blonde videotaping his antics, Reznor plays carnival games, such as throwing baseballs at images of musicians such as Michael Stipe, Billy Corgan, Fred Durst, Marilyn Manson, Gene Simmons, Paul Stanley, David Lee Roth, Garth Brooks, Mark McGrath, Courtney Love, Cher, Mariah Carey, Whitney Houston, and even Reznor himself. A woman dressed in kinderwhore attire, brandishing a statuette, is dunked into a tank of "waste". The theme of "breaking images" recurs throughout the video.

Images of other musicians throughout the video refer, in part, to a story about Reznor in Spin in 1997: "Unlike many musicians, Reznor is savagely aware of his place in the current strata of pop stars. He constantly compares himself to other musicians, saying that he 'can't write a thousand songs like Billy Corgan,' that he's 'not as careerist as [Marilyn] Manson,' that he 'can't sing about [his] big dick like David Lee Roth.'" At the end of the video, the blonde woman pulls off her wig to reveal herself as Manson.

Viewers took Manson's appearance in the video as a sign that Reznor and Manson had renewed their friendship. Manson sang "Starfuckers, Inc." live with the band once, a video recording of which is an easter egg on the And All that Could Have Been DVD.

Reznor said, "[Manson] called me and said, 'You know what, I'm fucking sick of people asking if this song is about me, so I've got a really cool idea for a video that'll just fuck with everybody '... We were just poking fun at that bloated sense of celebrity and inflated ego among this clique of royalty in America ... But I don't have a problem with Billy Corgan or Stipe or any of the people in the video – with the exception of Courtney Love."

== Track listings ==
- UK promotional 12" single

A. "Starfuckers, Inc." – 5:00
B. "The Day the World Went Away" (Porter Ricks Remix) – 7:02

- US promotional CD single
1. "Starsuckers, Inc." – 4:13
2. "Starfuckers, Inc." – 4:06
3. "Starsuckers, Inc." (video version) – 4:18
- German promotional CD single
1. "Starsuckers" – 5:01

== Charts ==
Chart (1999)	Peak position
US Alternative Airplay (Billboard)	39
