= And All That Could Have Been =

2002 live album by Nine Inch Nails

Live album with studio tracks by Nine Inch Nails
- Released: January 22, 2002
- Recorded: 2000 (Live); 2000-2001 (Still)
- Studios: Nothing (New Orleans); The Warehouse (Vancouver)
- Genres: Industrial rock; alternative rock; industrial metal; alternative metal (Live); Dark ambient; acoustic (Still)
- Length: 73:52 (Live); 43:20 (Still)
- Labels: Nothing; Interscope
- Producer: Trent Reznor

Nine Inch Nails chronology
| Things Falling Apart (2000) | And All That Could Have Been (2002) | With Teeth (2005) |

Halo numbers chronology
| Halo 16 (2000) | Halo 17 (2002) | Halo 18 (2005) |

Professional ratings
Review scores
| Source | Rating |
|---|---|
| AllMusic | (Live CD) (Still CD) (DVD) |
| Alternative Press | 8/10 |
| Drowned in Sound | 9/10 |
| Entertainment Weekly | B |
| Hot Press | 8/12 |
| IGN | 8/10 (DVD) |
| Los Angeles Times | 2.5/4 stars |
| NME | 5/10 |
| Q | 3/5 stars |
| Rolling Stone | (CD) |

And All That Could Have Been is a double album by the American industrial rock band Nine Inch Nails, released on January 22, 2002, by Nothing and Interscope Records. The live album contains music recorded during the Fragility v2.0 US tour in 2000. Disc one is a live album of most of the band's normal set list of the time, while disc two contains a studio album titled Still, containing "deconstructed" versions of previous Nine Inch Nails songs and some new material. The double DVD set, sold separately, includes video recordings of the songs performed on the CD, as well as additional song performances and footage from the tour.

== Fragility ==
Trent Reznor said that work on this release would serve as a transition between the tour and the next album. He spent most of a year producing it in a manner similar to his studio production, with the songs flowing into each other. The release was delayed from late 2001 to January 2002.

Although Reznor said "I thought the show was really, really good when we were doing it" while producing the DVD, he later wrote that "I can't watch it at all. I was sick for most of that tour and I really don't think it was Nine Inch Nails at its best."

== CD version ==
There are two retail versions of the CD set: a 'deluxe' limited edition, packaged in a gray cloth case that contains both the Live and Still CDs together in a fold-out digipak, and the standard edition that contains only the Live disc in a single digipak. The Still disc is also available separately, originally via mail order from the official Nine Inch Nails website.

=== Live ===
The Live disc is a "loud" recording of performances from the Fragility 2.0 tour. Without introduction, it begins immediately with "Terrible Lie".

The songs are arranged differently from their studio versions.

=== Still ===
Still contains subdued renditions of older songs and five new songs. According to the NIN website, four of the songs were "recorded live in a deconstructed fashion." Instruments include piano, acoustic guitar, electric piano, or other "real" instruments backed by computer-generated synth textures.

Reznor said that "Adrift and at Peace" is the conclusion of "La Mer" from The Fragile. Some of the tracks off Still are evolutions of rejected themes that were originally written for Mark Romanek's One Hour Photo. "Leaving Hope" is also the name under which Reznor has published music since the beginning of his songwriting career. Reznor later allowed "Leaving Hope" to be used in a public service announcement for Hurricane Katrina disaster relief.

Videos for the performances of "Something I Can Never Have", "Gone, Still" (with Jerome Dillon), and "The Becoming" (with Dillon and Danny Lohner) were published on the official NIN website.

The band also performed an intimate acoustic set at the Chicago Recording Company during the Fragility 2.0 tour, which is available online and on bootleg CD, as The CRC Sessions; it includes arrangements of "Something I Can Never Have" and "The Day the World Went Away" that prefigure their Still recordings, as well as two versions of "Hurt" and full band performances of "The Fragile", "Even Deeper", and "The Big Come Down". Nine Inch Nails' studio musician, Keith Hillebrandt, had filled in on keyboards for the absent Clouser at the session.

=== Track listing ===
All tracks are written by Trent Reznor, except where noted.

Disc one: Live (Halo 17a)
| No. | Title | Length |
|---|---|---|
| 1. | "Terrible Lie" | 4:59 |
| 2. | "Sin" | 4:15 |
| 3. | "March of the Pigs" | 4:13 |
| 4. | "Piggy" | 4:51 |
| 5. | "The Frail" | 1:41 |
| 6. | "The Wretched" | 5:24 |
| 7. | "Gave Up" | 4:14 |
| 8. | "The Great Below" | 5:07 |
| 9. | "The Mark Has Been Made" | 3:45 |
| 10. | "Wish" | 3:40 |
| 11. | "Suck" (writers: Reznor, Martin Atkins, Paul Barker, Bill Rieflin) | 4:13 |
| 12. | "Closer" | 5:38 |
| 13. | "Head Like a Hole" | 4:54 |
| 14. | "The Day the World Went Away" | 6:29 |
| 15. | "Starfuckers, Inc." (writers: Reznor, Charlie Clouser) | 5:30 |
| 16. | "Hurt" | 4:59 |
| Total length: | | 73:52 |

Disc two: Still (Halo 17b)
| No. | Title | Length |
|---|---|---|
| 1. | "Something I Can Never Have" | 6:39 |
| 2. | "Adrift and at Peace" | 2:52 |
| 3. | "The Fragile" | 5:12 |
| 4. | "The Becoming" | 4:30 |
| 5. | "Gone, Still" | 2:36 |
| 6. | "The Day the World Went Away" | 5:17 |
| 7. | "And All That Could Have Been" (writers: Reznor, Danny Lohner) | 6:14 |
| 8. | "The Persistence of Loss" | 4:03 |
| 9. | "Leaving Hope" | 5:57 |
| Total length: | | 43:20 |

=== Weekly charts ===
Weekly chart performance for And All That Could Have Been
| Chart (2002) | Peak position |
|---|---|
| Australian Albums (ARIA) | 41 |
| Austrian Albums (Ö3 Austria) | 21 |
| Canadian Albums (Nielsen SoundScan) | 17 |
| European Albums (Music & Media) | 86 |
| French Albums (SNEP) | 29 |
| German Albums (Offizielle Top 100) | 45 |
| Irish Albums (IRMA) | 75 |
| Japanese Albums (Oricon) | 62 |
| Scottish Albums (Official Charts) | 57 |
| UK Albums (Official Charts) | 54 |
| UK Rock & Metal Albums (Official Charts) | 4 |
| US Billboard 200 | 37 |

=== Year-end charts ===
Year-end chart performance for And All That Could Have Been
| Chart (2002) | Position |
|---|---|
| Canadian Alternative Albums (Nielsen SoundScan) | 99 |
| Canadian Metal Albums (Nielsen SoundScan) | 45 |

== DVD ==
And All That Could Have Been

Video by Nine Inch Nails
- Released: January 22, 2002
- Recorded: 2000
- Genres: Industrial rock; industrial metal
- Length: 105:53
- Labels: Nothing; Interscope
- Director: Rob Sheridan
- Producer: Trent Reznor

Nine Inch Nails chronology
| Closure (1997) | And All That Could Have Been (2002) | Beside You in Time (2007) |

The DVD version, produced by Trent Reznor and directed by Rob Sheridan, comprises video footage from the 2000 Fragility 2.0 tour. Sheridan and other members of the band's crew filmed the tour using consumer DV cameras, and the DVD was then put together internally at Reznor's New Orleans studio, where Sheridan and Reznor edited it on a Mac using Final Cut Pro and compiled it with DVD Studio Pro.

Although Reznor originally hired a filming company, he changed his mind based on cost and his experience from The Downward Spiral tour, wanting to capture the shows from a more realistic point of view. This decision allowed the crew to review the shots each night on the tour bus so they could tell what to focus on during the next show. As a result, the video is dark and smoky rather than polished, the cameras are sometimes shaky and there are no sweeping crane shots.

There are two different versions of the DVD set: one with a 5.1 Dolby Digital surround soundtrack and the other with a 5.1 DTS surround soundtrack. Releasing them separately allowed the picture quality to remain optimal on both versions. The DTS version does not allow on-the-fly alternate angle switching, but all the additional performances found via the hidden easter eggs on the DTS version are included in DTS 5.1 surround; on the Dolby version they are in Dolby 2.0 stereo only. Other than this, both sets are identical. This video was also released on one VHS tape.

The menus were designed to appear uniquely upon each viewing. The DVD package includes a clear, plastic slip with a message from Reznor.

Video artist Bill Viola created the multi-screen magnified imagery for "La Mer", "The Great Below", and "The Mark Has Been Made".

=== Bonus features and easter eggs ===
The DVD version has a number of bonus features and hidden easter eggs. In disc 1, there are alternate stationary camera angles for "La Mer", "The Great Below" and "The Mark Has Been Made". A stationary angle version for "Gave Up" is found by hitting ENTER at 26:58, or from the supplemental content menu on the DTS version.

Disc 2 includes a photo gallery and an audio commentary by Bill Viola discussing his video effects for "La Mer", "The Great Below" and "The Mark Has Been Made". The NinetyNine commercial (0:30) can be viewed by highlight "Main Menu" in the supplemental content menu, then pressing LEFT, UP, then ENTER. A performance of "Reptile" (6:24) can be found by pressing UP then ENTER during "Suck" at 1:06. A performance of "The Day the World Went Away" (6:36) featuring clips from a scrapped music video can be viewed by pressing LEFT, RIGHT, DOWN, UP, ENTER at 16:10. If ENTER is pressed at 24:15 during "Starfuckers, Inc.", then a video plays in which Marilyn Manson appears on stage to sing the end of that song, followed by a performance of "The Beautiful People" by Nine Inch Nails and Manson at the Madison Square Garden.

If "7" (or "6" on some versions) is pressed at 11:19 on Disc 2, the "Beneath The Surface" menu appears, which allows access to the aforementioned easter eggs as well as promo spots for The Fragile (0:30) and its remix album Things Falling Apart (1:02).

=== Track listing ===
| No. | Title | Length |
|---|---|---|
| 1. | "Terrible Lie" | 5:07 |
| 2. | "Sin" | 4:15 |
| 3. | "March of the Pigs" | 4:07 |
| 4. | "Piggy" | 4:57 |
| 5. | "The Frail" | 1:45 |
| 6. | "The Wretched" | 5:33 |
| 7. | "Gave Up" | 4:25 |
| 8. | "La Mer" | 4:46 |
| 9. | "The Great Below" | 5:07 |
| 10. | "The Mark Has Been Made" | 3:45 |
| 11. | "Wish" | 3:41 |
| 12. | "Complication" | 1:59 |
| 13. | "Suck" | 4:10 |
| 14. | "Closer" | 6:08 |
| 15. | "Head Like a Hole" | 5:51 |
| 16. | "Just Like You Imagined" | 3:52 |
| 17. | "Starfuckers, Inc." | 5:42 |
| 18. | "Hurt" | 4:59 |

Also contains an unlisted mix of "The New Flesh" and "Pinion" that serves as an introduction before "Terrible Lie". The DVD version comes on two discs, splitting the concert between "Complication" and "Suck".

== Personnel ==
- Trent Reznor – vocals, guitar, keyboards, bass guitar, Prophet VS
- Danny Lohner – bass guitar, guitar, synthesizer, backing vocals
- Robin Finck – guitar, synthesizer, E-bow, backing vocals
- Charlie Clouser – synthesizer, theremin, vocoder, backing vocals
- Jerome Dillon – drums, acoustic guitar
