= The Day the World Went Away =

1999 Nine Inch Nails song

Single by Nine Inch Nails

from the album The Fragile
- Released: July 20, 1999
- Genre: Post-rock; alternative rock; shoegaze; ambient
- Length: 4:33 (album version); 4:03 (single version)
- Label: Nothing; Interscope
- Songwriter: Trent Reznor
- Producers: Trent Reznor; Alan Moulder

Nine Inch Nails singles chronology
| "The Perfect Drug" (1997) | "The Day the World Went Away" (1999) | "We're in This Together" (1999) |

Halo numbers chronology
| Halo 12 (1997) | Halo 13 (1999) | Halo 14 (1999) |

Professional ratings
Review scores
| Source | Rating |
|---|---|
| AllMusic | 2/5 stars |

"The Day the World Went Away" is a song by the American industrial rock band Nine Inch Nails, released on July 20, 1999, as the lead single from their third studio album The Fragile (1999). The song was the band's first Top 40 hit on the US Billboard Hot 100, peaking at number 17, which remains their highest charting single.

== Style ==
When it was first released in 1999, New Music Monthly described "The Day the World Went Away" as a "single line of melody, repeated again and again, accompanied by slow, bad-dream guitar gruel that keeps wobbling like an off-center record...an oblique defense of suicide that relies on quietness rather than noise for its harrowing effect." The "quiet" version uses piano instead of guitar to "even scarier" effect. "The Day the World Went Away" contains no drums. Rolling Stone magazine called the song a "buoyant, spacey menace" and described the song in a 1999 feature on Reznor: "One part has massed, Black Sabbath-like guitars suspended in echo with discreet electronics and a slightly askew acoustic guitar that proves to be a ukulele. Another section is even more airy—somber piano, acoustic bass, a clean, intimate Reznor vocal, a mere eight lines of lyrics."

== Release and reception ==
It was Reznor's highest charting composition until "Old Town Road" hit number 1 in 2019. The song was a staple in the encore during the Fragility tour, and has been performed in many shows since.

The compact disc single contains three songs: the original version, a "quiet" remix of "The Day the World Went Away", and "Starfuckers, Inc.", another song from The Fragile. The 12-inch vinyl single replaced "Starfuckers, Inc." with another version of "The Day the World Went Away", this one remixed by the electronic music duo Porter Ricks. The main version of the title track featured on the single is approximately 30 seconds shorter than the version found on the album and contains slightly different vocals.

The version of "Starfuckers, Inc." featured on the single is almost identical to the album version, except that this version ends with the sound of Paul Stanley yelling "Goodnight!" to a cheering crowd. The yelling and crowd cheering are sampled from a Kiss concert recording. The opening to "Complication", the track which follows "Starfuckers, Inc." on The Fragile, can be heard faintly alongside the crowd noise, augmented to sound like part of the concert.

The flower depicted on the cover of the single is a Kangaroo paw. In 2013, Alan Zweig included it on a list of "selected songs for the end of the world."

== Music video ==
Trent Reznor in "The Day the World Went Away" music video.

A music video was made for the song but was never released.

An alternate video for the song, using live audio and a combination of live and original footage, is included as an Easter egg on the second disc of the And All That Could Have Been DVD.

== In other media ==
- The song was used in the third trailer of Terminator Salvation (2009).
- The song was used at the end of the 2016 episode of the same name of the sci-fi crime drama series Person of Interest.
- The song was used for the opening credits sequence of the 2023 "Omelette" episode of the second season of The Bear.
- The song was used during the trailer for Ridley Scott's film The Dog Stars (2026).
- Ramin Djawadi also composed a cover version of the song for the trailer of the fourth and final season of the sci-fi drama series Westworld, as well being also featured in the fifth episode "Zhuangzi".

== Formats and track listings ==
=== CD single ===
Nothing Records / Interscope Records INTDS-97026

1. "The Day the World Went Away" (single version) – 4:03
2. "Starfuckers, Inc." (long) – 5:24
3. "The Day the World Went Away (Quiet)" (remixed by Trent Reznor) – 6:20

=== 12-inch single ===
Nothing Records / Interscope Records INT12-97026

==== Side A ====
1. "The Day the World Went Away" (single version) – 4:01
2. "The Day the World Went Away (Quiet)" – 6:20

==== Side B ====
1. "The Day the World Went Away (Porter Ricks)" – 7:04

== Charts ==
| Chart (1999) | Peak position |
|---|---|
| Australia (ARIA) | 31 |
| Canada (Nielsen SoundScan) | 1 |
| US Billboard Hot 100 | 17 |

=== Year-end charts ===
| Chart (2001) | Position |
|---|---|
| Canada (Nielsen SoundScan) | 93 |

=== Decade-end charts ===
Decade-end chart performance for "The Day the World Went Away"
| Chart (1990s) | Position |
|---|---|
| Canada (Nielsen SoundScan) | 73 |
