= The Fragile =

1999 album by Nine Inch Nails

Studio album by Nine Inch Nails
- Released: September 21, 1999
- Recorded: January 1997 – July 1999
- Studios: Nothing, New Orleans
- Genres: Industrial rock; art rock; alternative rock
- Length: 103:39
- Labels: Nothing; Interscope
- Producers: Trent Reznor; Alan Moulder; Steve Duda; Dr. Dre; Bob Ezrin; Keith Hillebrandt

Nine Inch Nails chronology
Further Down the Spiral (1995)	The Fragile (1999)	Things Falling Apart (2000)

Halo numbers chronology
Halo 13 (1999)	Halo 14 (1999)	Halo 15 (1999)

Singles from The Fragile
- 1. "The Day the World Went Away" Released: July 20, 1999; 2. "We're in This Together" Released: September 27, 1999; 3. "Into the Void" Released: January 10, 2000

The Fragile is the third studio album by the American industrial rock band Nine Inch Nails, released as a triple album by Nothing Records and Interscope Records on September 21, 1999. It was produced by Nine Inch Nails frontman Trent Reznor and the English producer Alan Moulder, a longtime Reznor collaborator. It was recorded throughout 1997 to 1999 in New Orleans.

In a departure from The Downward Spiral (1994), the album has elements of ambient and electronic music. It continues some of the lyrical themes from The Downward Spiral, including depression and drug abuse, but also has more instrumental sections, including entire instrumental tracks. The record was promoted with three singles: "The Day the World Went Away", "We're in This Together", and "Into the Void", as well as the promotional single "Starfuckers, Inc." and an accompanying tour, the Fragility Tour, which spanned two legs. Several accompanying recordings were also released, including a remix album, Things Falling Apart (2000), a live album, And All That Could Have Been (2002), as well as an alternate version of the record, The Fragile: Deviations 1 (2016).

Upon release, critics applauded the album's ambition and composition, though some criticized its length and perceived lack of lyrical substance. In later years it has come to be regarded by many critics and listeners to be among the band's best work. The album debuted at number one in the U.S. to become the band's first chart-topper, and was eventually certified double platinum by the RIAA.

== Writing and recording ==
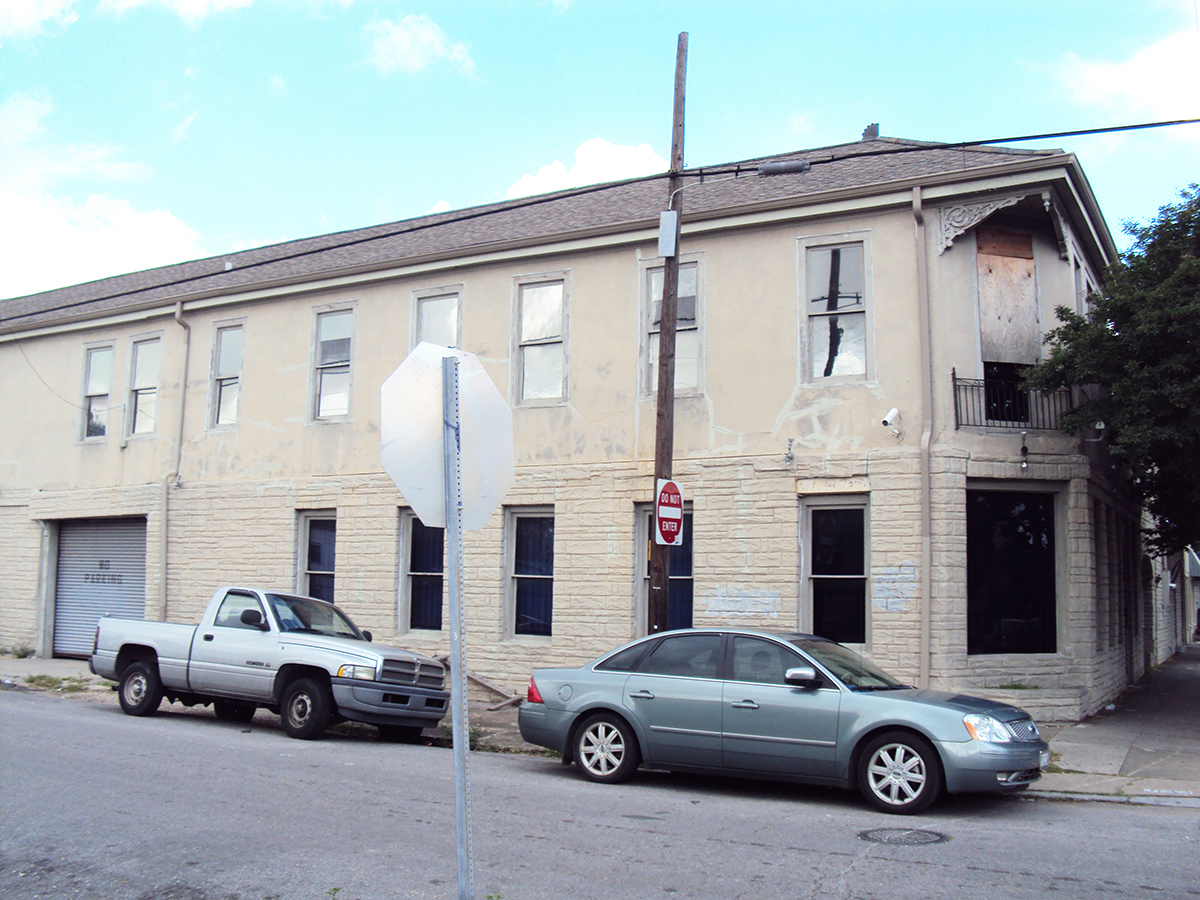
Outsides of Nothing Studios, New Orleans, where The Fragile was recorded between 1997 and 1999; the building no longer exists.

The Fragile was an album based a lot in fear, because I was afraid as fuck about what was happening to me ... That's why there aren't a lot of lyrics on that record. I couldn't fucking think. An unimaginable amount of effort went into that record in a very unfocused way.

— Trent Reznor

The Fragile was produced by Trent Reznor and Alan Moulder at Nothing Studios in New Orleans. There were some personnel changes within Nine Inch Nails after the Self-Destruct tour, which saw drummer Chris Vrenna replaced by Bill Rieflin and Jerome Dillon, the latter of whom would become Nine Inch Nails' full-time drummer until late 2005. Charlie Clouser and Danny Lohner contributed occasional instrumentation and composition to several tracks although the album was predominantly written and performed by Reznor alone. The Fragile was mixed by Alan Moulder and mastered by Tom Baker. The packaging was created by David Carson and Rob Sheridan.

== Music and lyrics ==
Over a year before the album's release, Reznor suggested, perhaps with intentional or dismissive misdirection, that the album would "be irritating to people because it's not traditional Nine Inch Nails. Think of the most ridiculous music you could ever imagine with nursery rhymes over the top of it. A bunch of pop songs."

"The Day the World Went Away"
Album version, as it appeared on The Fragile

"La Mer"
Album version, as it appeared on The Fragile

In contrast to the heavily distorted instruments and gritty industrial sounds of their previous album, The Downward Spiral, The Fragile relies more on soundscapes, electronic beats, ambient noise, rock-laden guitar, and the usage of melodies as harmonies. Several critics noted that the album was seemingly influenced by progressive rock, art rock, electronica, and avant-garde music. It is categorized as an art rock album by The Rolling Stone Album Guide (2004), Edna Gundersen of USA Today, and Will Hermes of Entertainment Weekly. Hermes views that, like "art-rockers" King Crimson and David Bowie, Reznor incorporates elements of 20th-century classical music on the album, "mixing prepared piano melodies à la John Cage with thematic flavor from Claude Debussy". Music journalist Ann Powers observes elements of progressive rock bands King Crimson and Roxy Music, Reznor's influences, and the experimentation of electronica artists such as Autechre and Squarepusher, and writes that The Fragile uses funk bass lines, North African minor-key modalities, and the treatment of tonality by Symbolist composers like Debussy. The album also features several distorted guitar parts which Powers suggests that fans can enjoy. Rob Sheffield observes a "prog-rock vibe" akin to Pink Floyd's 1979 album The Wall and feels that The Fragile is similarly "a double album that vents ... alienation and misery into paranoid studio hallucinations, each track crammed with overdubs until there's no breathing room".

"About 10 years ago or so I locked myself away in a house on the ocean, and I tried to... I said I was trying to write some music. Some of which wound up on The Fragile. But what I was really doing was trying to kill myself. And the whole time I was away by myself, I managed to write one song, which is this song. So when I play it I feel pretty weird about it, because it takes me back to a pretty dark and awful time in my life. It's weird to think how different things are now: I'm still alive, I haven't died yet. And I'm afraid to go back to that place because it feels kind of haunting to me, but I'm going to go back. I'm going to get married [to Mariqueen Maandig] there."

— Reznor on the origins of the song "La Mer", at a 2009 performance in Mansfield, MA.

Described by Reznor as a sequel to The Downward Spiral—an album with a plot detailing the destruction of a man—The Fragile is a concept album dealing with his personal issues, including depression, angst, and drug abuse. His vocals, for the most part, are more melodic and somewhat softer, a departure from his harsh and often angry singing in previous works. However, several music critics including Reznor noticed the lack of lyrics on the album. The Bulletin interprets it as an industrial rock album about "fear and loathing that could compete with Pink Floyd's The Wall". In some ways, The Fragile is a response to The Downward Spiral. Reznor compared the lyrical content of the two albums:

I wanted this album to sound like there was something inherently flawed in the situation, like someone struggling to put the pieces together. The Downward Spiral was about peeling off layers and arriving at a naked, ugly end. This album starts at the end, then attempts to create order from chaos, but never reaches the goal. It's probably a bleaker album because it arrives back where it starts — (with) the same emotion. The album begins "Somewhat Damaged" and ends "Ripe (With Decay)".

The song "I'm Looking Forward to Joining You, Finally" is credited in the album's booklet as "for clara", suggesting that the song's topic, like "The Day the World Went Away", is about Reznor's grandmother, Clara Clark. Fight Club author Chuck Palahniuk singled out "The Wretched" for comment: "I remember being amazed when I first heard this... This wasn't just ennui: this was an active, aggressive, angry lack of caring. It's not 'Let's kill ourselves'; it's 'Let's kill each other'... It's not rock 'n' roll and it's not classical. It's something in between."

== Packaging ==
Cover of an instrumental version of The Fragile, and the original full photograph of the waterfall

The cover artwork was designed by David Carson. A section within his book Fotografiks reveals that the top section of the album cover is from a photo of a waterfall and the bottom section is from a closeup photo of the inside of a seashell. Carson elaborated on this further in an image on his website:

[The] back [cover] was going to be the front until the last moment. Trent changed it saying 'it was kinda irritating' yet something about it we liked so maybe it fit the music. Front cover flowers I shot outside of Austin, Texas. The 1 hour place called and said they messed up and used the wrong chemicals and the film was ruined. I said 'lemme see 'em anyway'. This is how they came out. Cover image is a waterfall in Iceland and a seashell in the West Indies.

== Promotion ==
=== Fragility Tour ===
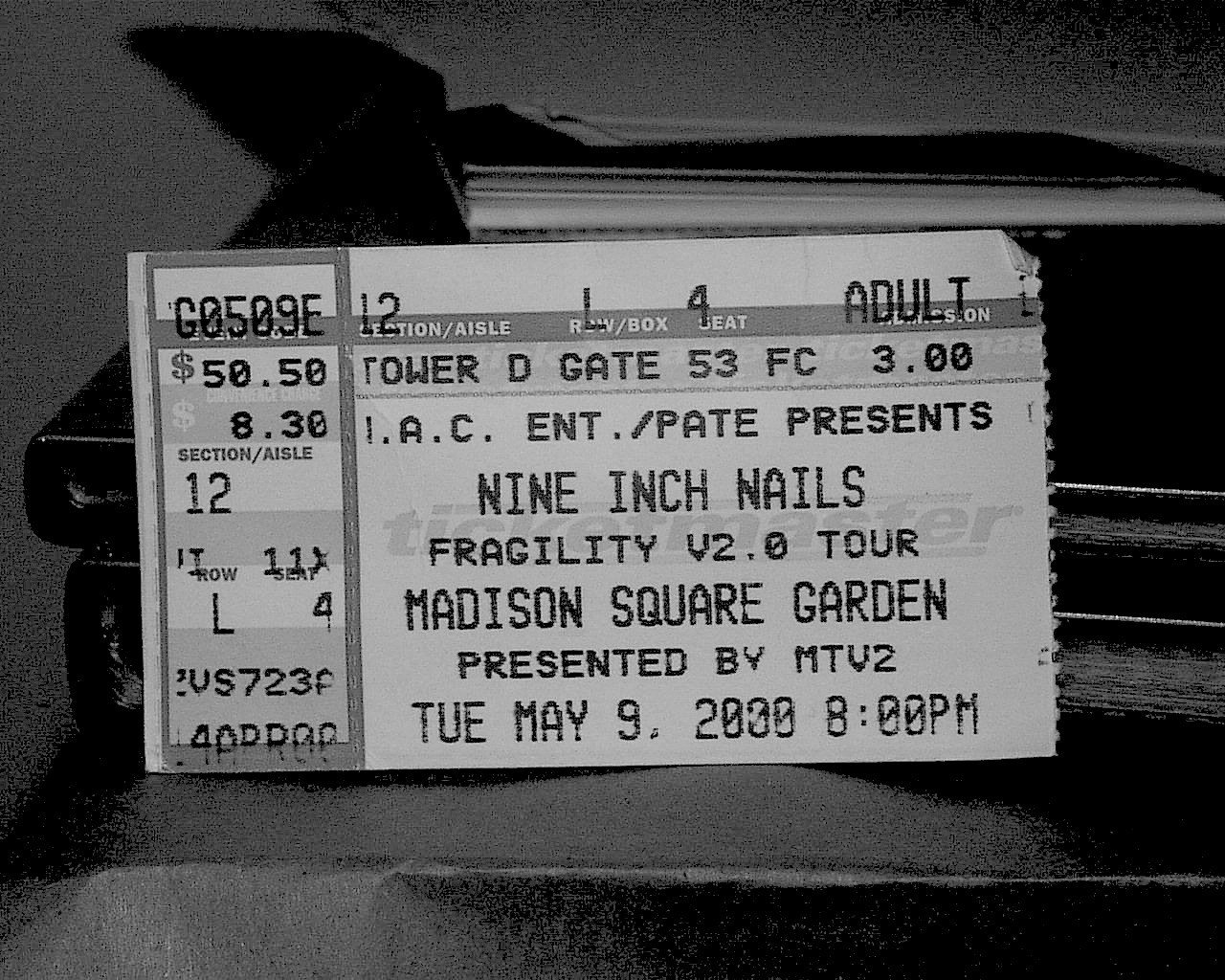
Ticket for a Nine Inch Nails concert in Madison Square Garden as part of the Fragility v2.0 Tour

On September 10, 1998, at the 1998 MTV Video Music Awards, a thirty-second teaser trailer was shown on television to promote the then untitled album. It would be more than a year before the album was finally released. The first single, "The Day the World Went Away", was released two months before the album. "Into the Void" and "We're in This Together" proved to be the album's most successful singles. The B-side "Starfuckers, Inc." was released on the album as a track at the last minute, and served as a promotional single for The Fragile. In support of The Fragile, the Nine Inch Nails live band reformed for the Fragility tour. The tour began in late 1999 and lasted until mid-2000, spanning Europe, Japan, New Zealand, Australia, and North America. The tour consisted of two major legs, labeled Fragility 1.0 and Fragility 2.0. The live band lineup remained largely the same from the previous tour in support of The Downward Spiral, featuring Robin Finck on guitar, Charlie Clouser on keyboards, and Danny Lohner on bass guitar. Reznor held open auditions to find a new drummer, eventually picking then-unknown Jerome Dillon. Nine Inch Nails' record label at the time, Interscope Records, reportedly refused to fund the promotional tour following The Fragile's lukewarm sales. Reznor instead committed to fund the entire tour himself, which quickly sold out. He concluded that "the reality is, I'm broke at the end of the tour", but also added, "I will never present a show that isn't fantastic." The tour featured increasingly large production values, including a triptych video display created by contemporary video artist Bill Viola. Rolling Stone magazine named Fragility the best tour of 2000. In 2002, the tour documentary And All That Could Have Been was released featuring performances from the Fragility 2.0 tour. While making the DVD, Reznor commented on the tour in retrospect by saying "I thought the show was really, really good when we were doing it", but later wrote that "I can't watch it at all. I was sick for most of that tour and I really don't think it was Nine Inch Nails at its best."

In the years leading up to the Fragility Tour, Reznor's personal life had been complicated by addiction and grief. Following the commercial breakthrough of The Downward Spiral (1994), Reznor struggled privately with alcohol and drug use, which intensified after the death of his grandmother, the woman who had raised him. The loss profoundly destabilized him, and he began using substances heavily to cope. Cocaine and alcohol became central to his daily routine, with sessions often blurring into days of self-destructive excess. The recording of The Fragile took place during this period. Reznor later acknowledged that he was frequently incapable of writing lyrics or focusing on production because of withdrawal and intoxication. Although The Fragile was widely acclaimed upon release in 1999, Reznor himself could not appreciate its reception. In an interview cited by Exclaim!, he admitted that during this era "nothing felt good anymore, not music, not success, not anything". By the time the Fragility Tour began, Reznor was carrying the weight of his addictions into one of the most elaborate and demanding concert productions of his career. The most serious event occurred in June 2000, during the European leg of the tour in London. According to The Guardian, Reznor obtained what he thought was cocaine but which turned out to be heroin, specifically a highly potent form sometimes referred to as "China white", a type of fentanyl. After ingesting the drug, he collapsed and suffered a near-fatal overdose, requiring emergency medical care. The episode forced the cancellation of concerts and marked the lowest point of Reznor's life.

The overdose left Reznor shaken. Though he continued to downplay the severity of his addiction immediately afterward, the London episode planted the realization that he was no longer in control. Several planned European performances were canceled, and Nine Inch Nails temporarily withdrew from touring. By 2001, Reznor entered rehabilitation, beginning the process of recovery. In interviews, he has repeatedly cited the 2000 overdose as the moment that forced him to confront the reality of his addictions. In a 2005 conversation he stated: "If I drink again I’ll probably die. And I don’t want to die."

== Reissue ==
"The Fragile occupies a very interesting and intimate place in my heart. I was going through a turbulent time in my life when making it and revisiting it has become a form of therapy for me. As an experiment, I removed all the vocals from the record and found it became a truly changed experience that worked on a different yet compelling level. The Fragile: Deviations 1 represents Atticus and I embellishing the original record with a number of tracks from those sessions we didn't use before. The result paints a complimentary but different picture we wanted to share."

— Reznor, in a press release for The Fragile: Deviations 1

On September 21, 2009—the tenth anniversary of the album's release—a Nine Inch Nails official Twitter update hinted that a deluxe 5.1 surround audio reissue of The Fragile was in the works and was scheduled for a 2010 release. During an interview with The New York Times that was broadcast on January 7, 2011, after questioned about the album Reznor explained:

The Fragile is weird because when it came out it felt like everyone hated it to me, and now it feels like it's everyone's favorite album, fan-wise. I was probably going to save this for some other announcement, but Alan Moulder's spent a couple of months restoring all the multitracks, prepping for a surround mix, and we plan on doing that this spring, and I'm not sure when it's going to come out but it's just something I'd like to get done and there's no record better than that to get surround mixed. It has to be Alan Moulder, and we both look back at that record – I've just spent some time with him now, he's still a very good friend of mine – and the experience of doing it in the bound that we had in literally two years, every day working together on that, was one of the best times in our lives. I think, in hindsight, I should have had [The Fragile] two single records, much Radiohead style with Kid A and Amnesiac, recorded at once, broken into two digestible chunks. Hey, it is what it is, but I thought about going back, redoing bits that I would mess around with to see how it would be if I were to do that record now, but I don't know if I should phase. Sometime this year expect something to come out surround-wise.

While on tour in 2014 in Australia and New Zealand, Reznor was interviewed by a local reporter and was quoted about the reissue stating:

Yeah, we've done a lot of the work for that. Really what it's come down to is with all the other stuff going on, the Fragile thing in particular, I want to make sure I get it right. You know, we've mixed everything in surround, it sounds amazing, we have a great package ready to go. I just stumbled across 40-or-so demos that are from that era that didn't turn into songs, that range from sound effects to full-fledge pieces of music, and I kind of feel like - something should happen with that. And I think it has something to do with that package, and I just need the bandwidth to kind of calmly think about it, and decide how much effort I want to devote into that and what to do with it. I have a lot of ideas that could eat up immense amounts of time and I'm trying to weigh out - just think it through. I don't want to pull the trigger on something and go, 'Man, I should have done it in this way.' And I just haven't had a chance to be in a calm place where I can think it through completely and make that decision.

In June 2015, an instrumental version of the album was released to Apple Music. This version of the album also includes alternative versions of "The Frail", "Just Like You Imagined", "Pilgrimage", "La Mer", "The Mark Has Been Made", and "Complication", the instrumental version of "The Day the World Went Away (Quiet)", an extended version of "+Appendage", a demo version of "10 Miles High" called "Hello, Everything Is Not OK", and two previously unreleased tracks from The Fragile ("The March" and "Can I Stay Here?")

In 2017 a reissue of the vinyl version of The Fragile was released, alongside an expanded, instrumental version, titled The Fragile: Deviations 1. This version of The Fragile contains all songs in either instrumental or alternate formats, and combines them with newly released songs written and recorded during the sessions for The Fragile. Deviations 1 consists of a one-off 4×LP pressing.

== Critical reception and legacy ==
Professional ratings
Review scores
Source	Rating
AllMusic	4.5/5 stars
Christgau's Consumer Guide	B
Entertainment Weekly	A−
The Guardian	4/5 stars
Los Angeles Times	3.5/4 stars
NME	5/10
Pitchfork	2.0/10 (1999) 8.7/10 (2017)
Rolling Stone	4/5 stars
Spin	9/10
USA Today	4/4 stars

The Fragile received generally positive reviews from contemporary critics. Mojo called it "an impressively multi-textured, satisfyingly violent sonic workout", and Alternative Press found it "nothing short of astounding". Edna Gundersen of USA Today called it "meticulously honed and twisted to baffle, tantalize, disarm and challenge the listener", and wrote that "the coats of polish ... can't camouflage Trent Reznor's perverse and subversive paths to musical glory." Ann Powers of Spin called the album "a good old-fashioned strap-on-your-headphones experience". Jon Pareles of The New York Times wrote that, although he "doesn't approach suicide as he did on" The Downward Spiral, "Reznor can hide in the studio and piece together music that's as cunning, and disquieting, as his raw anger used to be." Will Hermes of Entertainment Weekly viewed that, even "if [Reznor's] emotional palette is limited, it remains broader than any of his metalhead peers", and that, "right now, hard rock simply doesn't get any smarter, harder, or more ambitious than this." Robert Hilburn of the Los Angeles Times wrote that, despite its length, "this is a profoundly challenging and moving work that strikes at the hollowness of most contemporary pop-rock with bullwhip force." The Guardian's Adam Sweeting praised it as "a fearsomely accomplished mix of monster riffing, brooding melodies and patches of minimalist soul-searching". Rolling Stone writer Rob Sheffield felt that the album's "excess is Reznor's chosen shock tactic here, and what's especially shocking is how much action he packs into his digital via dolorosa."

In a negative review, Pitchfork's Brent DiCrescenzo panned the album's lyrics as "overly melodramatic". John Aizlewood of Q felt that it is "let down by Reznor's refusal to trouble himself with melody and by some embarrassing lyrics". NME's Victoria Segal panned its music as "background" and accused it of "chas[ing] 'crossover'", with "grey rock sleet masquerading as a storm beneath a haze of 'experimental' textures." Scott Seward of The Village Voice facetiously commended Reznor for "once again ... pioneering the marriage of heavy guitars, moody atmospherics, electronic drones and beats, and aggressive singing. Just like Killing Joke 20 years ago." Village Voice critic Robert Christgau was even less receptive: "After six fucking years, genius-by-acclamation Trent Reznor delivers double-hoohah, every second remixed till it glistens like broken glass on a prison wall. Is the way he takes his petty pain out on the world a little, er, immature for a guy who's pushing 35? Never mind, I'm told—just immerse in the music. So I do. 'Dream job: emperor,' it says. 'More fun than death by injection.'"

The Fragile was included on several magazines' "end-of-year" album lists, including The Village Voice (number 14), Rolling Stone (number four), and Spin (number one). In a retrospective review, The Rolling Stone Album Guide (2004) gave it three-and-a-half out of five stars and wrote that, as "NIN's monumental double-disc bid for the art-rock crown, The Fragile sounds fantastic from start to finish, but there aren't enough memorable tunes underneath the alluring surfaces." AllMusic editor Stephen Thomas Erlewine offered similar criticism, writing that "Reznor's music is immaculately crafted and arranged, with every note and nuance gliding into the next — but he spent more time constructing surfaces than songs. Those surfaces can be enticing but since it's just surface, The Fragile winds up being vaguely unsatisfying." In 2005, The Fragile was ranked number 341 in Rock Hard magazine's book The 500 Greatest Rock & Metal Albums of All Time. In 2016, Exclaim! listed The Fragile at number two on their "Essential Albums" list for Nine Inch Nails, citing it as their most ambitious work and "a tragic if not stunning portrait of depression." Pitchfork would later reassess the album in their review of the album's 2017 "Definitive Edition", with a score change going from 2.0 to 8.7, describing it as Reznor's "magnum opus... The Fragile scrapes the sky like never before."

In Metal Hammer, it was named one of the 10 best industrial metal albums as well as one of the 20 best metal albums of 1999.

== Commercial performance ==
The Fragile debuted atop the Billboard 200 with first-week sales of 229,000 copies, earning the band their first number-one album on the chart. The album fell to number 16 the following week, becoming the largest drop from number one at the time. On January 4, 2000, the album was certified double platinum by the Recording Industry Association of America (RIAA), and by May 2005, it had sold 898,000 copies in the United States.

Steven Hyden of The A.V. Club wrote that Reznor developed Nine Inch Nails from its role as a prominent rock act and by the time he finished recording The Fragile, alternative rock's overall popularity declined with several of Nine Inch Nails' contemporaries being disestablished or displaced by newer bands. Hyden also attributes the album's commercial performance to the rise of file-sharing on the Internet, which deviated from the alternative rock movement's emphasis on "fetishized vinyl" and "music festivals as peaceful places for young people to commune and dream of better futures."

== Track listing ==
All songs written Trent Reznor, except where noted; all songs produced by Reznor and Alan Moulder, except where noted.

Left disc
No.	Title	Writer(s)	Producer(s)	Length
1.	"Somewhat Damaged"	Reznor; Danny Lohner		4:31
2.	"The Day the World Went Away"			4:33
3.	"The Frail"			1:54
4.	"The Wretched"			5:25
5.	"We're in This Together"			7:16
6.	"The Fragile"			4:35
7.	"Just Like You Imagined"			3:49
8.	"Even Deeper"	Reznor; Lohner	Reznor; Moulder; Dr. Dre^{[a]}	5:47
9.	"Pilgrimage"		Reznor; Moulder; Steve Duda	3:31
10.	"No, You Don't"			3:35
11.	"La Mer"			4:37
12.	"The Great Below"			5:17
Total length:				54:51

Right disc
No.	Title	Writer(s)	Producer(s)	Length
1.	"The Way Out Is Through"	Reznor; Keith Hillebrandt; Charlie Clouser	Reznor; Moulder; Hillebrandt^{[a]}	4:17
2.	"Into the Void"			4:49
3.	"Where Is Everybody?"			5:40
4.	"The Mark Has Been Made" (includes a hidden intro to "10 Miles High")			5:15
5.	"Please"			3:31
6.	"Starfuckers, Inc."	Reznor; Clouser		5:00
7.	"Complication"			2:31
8.	"I'm Looking Forward to Joining You, Finally"			4:14
9.	"The Big Come Down"			4:12
10.	"Underneath It All"			2:46
11.	"Ripe (With Decay)"			6:34
Total length:				48:48 1:43:39

- ^{^[a]} signifies an additional producer

Note: Bob Ezrin provided additional production and album sequencing production to every song on the album.

== The Fragile: Deviations 1 ==
The Fragile: Deviations 1

Compilation album by Nine Inch Nails
- Released: December 23, 2016
- Recorded: January 1997-July 1999
- Studios: Nothing, New Orleans
- Genres: Alternative rock; art rock; ambient; instrumental rock
- Length: 155:46
- Label: The Null Corporation
- Producers: Trent Reznor; Alan Moulder; Atticus Ross

Nine Inch Nails chronology
Not the Actual Events (2016)	The Fragile: Deviations 1 (2016)	Add Violence (2017)

Halo numbers chronology
"Halo 29" (2016)	"Halo 30" (2016)	"Halo 31" (2017)

Professional ratings
Review scores
Source	Rating
AllMusic	3.5/5 stars
Pitchfork	6.6/10

The Fragile: Deviations 1 is an alternate version of The Fragile that contains all of the original songs in either instrumental or alternate forms, and combines them with newly released tracks written and recorded during the sessions for The Fragile. Deviations 1 consists of a one-off, limited edition four-LP pressing that was not made available on CD.

=== Critical reception ===
Neil Z. Yeung of AllMusic recommended that fans listen to and understand the original album first before delving into Deviations 1. Ultimately, he said that the release "serves as both a sonic time capsule and a reminder of one of NIN's most rewarding and underrated efforts." Writing for Pitchfork, Sean T. Collins found Deviations 1 interesting but simultaneously perplexing, saying "Far too many of Deviations' freshly vocal-free songs sound like karaoke versions rather than instrumentals that can stand on their own. The result is a listening experience that outstays its welcome on a song-by-song basis, let alone over the course of its massive 150-minute running time."

=== Track listing ===
Disc one, side A
No.	Title	Length
1.	"Somewhat Damaged" (instrumental)	4:53
2.	"The Day the World Went Away" (instrumental)	5:29
3.	"The Frail" (alternate version)	1:46
4.	"The Wretched" (instrumental)	6:00
Total length:		18:08

Disc one, side B
No.	Title	Length
1.	"Missing Places"	1:26
2.	"We're in This Together" (instrumental)	6:50
3.	"The Fragile" (instrumental)	4:48
4.	"Just Like You Imagined" (alternate version)	3:46
5.	"The March" (instrumental)	3:42
Total length:		20:32

Disc two, side A
No.	Title	Length
1.	"Even Deeper" (instrumental)	6:19
2.	"Pilgrimage" (alternate version)	3:04
3.	"One Way to Get There"	2:44
4.	"No, You Don't" (instrumental)	3:16
5.	"Taken"	3:35
Total length:		18:58

Disc two, side B
No.	Title	Length
1.	"La Mer" (alternate version)	4:54
2.	"The Great Below" (instrumental)	5:25
3.	"Not What It Seems Like" (instrumental)	3:30
4.	"White Mask"	3:22
5.	"The New Flesh" (instrumental)	3:40
Total length:		20:51

Disc three, side A
No.	Title	Length
1.	"The Way Out Is Through" (alternate version)	4:26
2.	"Into the Void" (instrumental)	4:44
3.	"Where Is Everybody?" (instrumental)	4:55
4.	"The Mark Has Been Made" (alternate version)	4:44
Total length:		18:49

Disc three, side B
No.	Title	Length
1.	"Was It Worth It?" (instrumental)	5:03
2.	"Please" (instrumental)	3:30
3.	"+Appendage" (instrumental)	3:19
4.	"Can I Stay Here?" (instrumental)	4:25
5.	"10 Miles High" (instrumental)	5:16
Total length:		21:33

Disc four, side A
No.	Title	Length
1.	"Feeders"	2:02
2.	"Starfuckers, Inc." (instrumental)	5:33
3.	"Complication" (alternate version)	2:55
4.	"Claustrophobia Machine (Raw)"	2:39
5.	"Last Heard From"	2:06
Total length:		15:15

Disc four, side B
No.	Title	Length
1.	"I'm Looking Forward to Joining You, Finally" (instrumental)	4:17
2.	"The Big Come Down" (instrumental)	4:05
3.	"Underneath It All" (instrumental)	3:21
4.	"Ripe (With Decay)" (instrumental)	7:35
Total length:		19:18; 2:33:24

== Personnel ==
Credits taken from The Fragile liner notes.

=== Musicians ===
- Trent Reznor – vocals, all musical performance except as noted, programming and production
- Charlie Clouser – programming, additional sound design; atmospheres on "The Great Below" and drum programming on "Into the Void", sound design on "Starfuckers Inc."
- Danny Lohner – guitars on "Somewhat Damaged", "Just Like You Imagined", "Even Deeper", "The Great Below", "Where Is Everybody?" and "Complication"; drum programming and synthesizers on "Even Deeper"
- Jerome Dillon – chorus drums on "We're in This Together"
- Adrian Belew – guitars on "Just Like You Imagined", "The Great Below" and "Where Is Everybody?"
- Steve Duda – marching percussion, programming and production on "Pilgrimage"; chorus on "Starfuckers, Inc."; violin on "Ripe (With Decay)"; additional sound design
- Mike Garson – piano on "Just Like You Imagined", "The Way Out Is Through" and "Ripe (With Decay)"
- Keith Hillebrandt – programming and additional production on "The Way Out Is Through"; chorus on "Starfuckers, Inc."; additional sound design
- Cherry Holly – trumpet on "Pilgrimage"
- Denise Milfort – vocals on "La Mer"
- Kim Prevost – backing vocals on "Into the Void"
- Bill Rieflin – drums on "La Mer"
- Willie – cello on "La Mer"

=== Production and technical personnel ===
- Steve Albini – engineering and supplemental drum recording
- Tom Baker – mastering
- Clinton Bradley – programming; technical assistant to Bob Ezrin
- Paul Bradley – programming
- David Carson – art direction, design and photography
- Paul DeCarli – programming
- Dr. Dre – additional production and mixing assistance on "Even Deeper"
- Bob Ezrin – additional production (album sequencing)
- Ken Friedman – additional sound design
- Leo Herrera – additional engineering
- Alan Moulder – production, engineering and mixing
- Dave Ogilvie – additional engineering
- Brian Pollack – engineering

=== Choirs ===
- Buddha Debutante Choir (track 2):
  - Heather Bennett
  - Melissa Daigle
  - Judy Miller
  - Christine Parrish
  - M. Gabriela Rivas
  - Martha Wood
  - Fae Young
- Choir (track 8):
  - Di Coleman
  - Tracy Hardin
  - Gary L. Neal
  - Traci Nelson
  - Elquine L. Rice
  - Terry L. Rice
  - Rodney Sulton
  - Stefani Taylor
  - Barbara Wilson
  - Leslie Wilson
- Buddha Boys Choir (tracks 9 and 18):
  - Eric Edmonson
  - Doug Idleman
  - Marcus London
  - Clint Mansell
  - Adam Persaud
  - Nick Scott
  - Nigel Wiesehan

== Charts ==
=== Weekly charts ===
Chart (1999)	Peak position
Australian Albums (ARIA)	2
Austrian Albums (Ö3 Austria)	14
Belgian Albums (Ultratop Flanders)	36
Canadian Albums (Billboard)	2
European Albums (Music & Media)	17
Finnish Albums (Suomen virallinen lista)	10
French Albums (SNEP)	27
German Albums (Offizielle Top 100)	17
Japanese Albums (Oricon)	15
New Zealand Albums (RMNZ)	28
Norwegian Albums (VG-lista)	9
Scottish Albums (Official Charts)	19
Swedish Albums (Sverigetopplistan)	18
UK Albums (Official Charts)	10
US Billboard 200	1

Chart (2025)	Peak position
Greek Albums (IFPI)	1

=== Year-end charts ===
Chart (1999)	Position
US Billboard 200	164

== Certifications ==
Region	Certification	Certified units/sales
Canada (Music Canada)	2× Platinum	200,000^{^}
United Kingdom (BPI)	Silver	60,000^{^}
United States (RIAA)	2× Platinum	898,000
^{^} Shipments figures based on certification alone.

== See also ==
- List of Billboard 200 number-one albums of 1999
