= Into the Void (Nine Inch Nails song) =

Nine Inch Nails song

Single by Nine Inch Nails

from the album The Fragile
- Released: January 10, 2000
- Genre: Alternative rock: alternative dance; art rock; industrial rock; electro-industrial
- Length: 4:52
- Label: Nothing; Interscope
- Songwriter: Trent Reznor
- Producers: Trent Reznor; Alan Moulder

Nine Inch Nails singles chronology
"Starfuckers, Inc." (1999)	"Into the Void" (2000)	"Deep" (2001)

"Into the Void" is a song by American industrial rock band Nine Inch Nails from their third studio album, The Fragile, released in 1999. It is the album's third single and saw release early 2000. A music video was directed by Walter Stern and Jeff Richter.

== Release and reception ==
"Into the Void" was released as a single only in Australia on 10 January 2000. It peaked at #72 on the ARIA singles chart. This Australian release lacks a halo number, making it the only commercial Nine Inch Nails release with that distinction. (The Capital G single was released to Europe as a non-halo'ed 9" vinyl in June 2007.) However, a two-track promotional CD for "Into the Void", released only in the United States, was incorrectly identified as Halo Sixteen. As it was not an international release and was only sold in Australia, it is considered a rare release for NIN memorabilia collectors.

The version of "The Perfect Drug" included on this single is slightly longer than the one released on the Lost Highway soundtrack. It fades out at the end instead of ending abruptly. It is the same version found on the "We're in This Together Pt. 3" single. This track and all of the other tracks on this disc can be found on other halos.

"Into the Void" was nominated for the Grammy Award for Best Male Rock Vocal Performance, but lost to "Again" by Lenny Kravitz. On YouTube Music, the song was mistakely marked as explicit.

== Music video ==
A music video for the song was directed by Walter Stern and Jeff Richter. An alternate version of the video was later released. The video begins with a series of macrophotographic close-ups of Trent Reznor, including his eyes, hair, and mouth. The video concludes with the Nine Inch Nails band performing the song in a red room and eventually destroying their equipment and the set itself. Into the Void was nominated for the 2000 MTV Video Music Awards Breakthrough Video award, but lost out to Björk's All Is Full of Love, directed by Chris Cunningham.

== Track listing ==
No.	Title	Length
1.	"Into the Void"	4:52
2.	"We're in This Together"	7:18
3.	"The Perfect Drug"	5:43
4.	"The New Flesh"	3:40

== Charts ==
Chart (2000)	Peak position
Australia (ARIA)	72
US Modern Rock Tracks (Billboard)	11
US Mainstream Rock Tracks (Billboard)	27

== In other media ==
The song was played in the 2000 film Final Destination in one of the characters' car radio, highlighting a coincidental appearance of the phrase "final destination" in the lyrics.

During Tennocon 2023, the song was used in a cinematic teaser trailer for a then-upcoming Whispers in the Walls update for the video game Warframe. The song was also featured in game when the update went live on December 13, 2023.
