= Beside You in Time =

2007 video album by Nine Inch Nails

Video by Nine Inch Nails
- Released: February 26, 2007
- Recorded: 2005–06 throughout North America
- Genres: Industrial rock; industrial metal
- Length: 122 minutes
- Labels: Nothing; Interscope
- Director: Rob Sheridan
- Producer: Trent Reznor

Nine Inch Nails chronology
And All That Could Have Been (2002)	Beside You in Time (2007)	Another Version of the Truth (2009)

Halo numbers chronology
Halo 21 (2006)	Halo 22 (2007)	Halo 23 (2007)

Beside You in Time is the third video album by American industrial rock band Nine Inch Nails, released in Europe on February 26, 2007 and in the United States on February 27, 2007. The video documents the band's 2006 Live: With Teeth Tour, and is available on DVD, HD DVD and Blu-ray formats. An edited version of the video aired on DirecTV's The 101 Network in March 2007.

The video is the final release to include the Nothing Records logo, and the label's last album, since it was declared extinct after the release date.

== Background ==
Prior to the concert dates, Trent Reznor announced on the message board for the band's official website, The Spiral, that two consecutive shows on the Live: With Teeth Tour (namely, March 28, 2006 in Oklahoma City, Oklahoma, and March 30, 2006 in El Paso, Texas) would be filmed in high-definition video for future release. The footage from these shows was used for the main feature of Beside You in Time. Several songs played at the filmed concerts in March were not included on the official track-listing: "Sin", which was played on March 28; "Every Day Is Exactly the Same", "Even Deeper" and "Suck", which were all played on both dates; and pre-recorded intro tracks "Pilgrimage", as used on March 28, and "Pinion", as used on March 30.

Footage of the band's summer 2006 amphitheatre tour (featuring a significantly different light show than the arena tour), which was filmed "sporadically" on hand-held consumer HDV cameras throughout the last thirteen shows of the tour, supplements the main feature. Including this bonus footage, Beside You In Time features high-definition video and surround sound for 8 songs from With Teeth, 2 from The Fragile, 4 from The Downward Spiral, 3 from Broken, 3 from Pretty Hate Machine, 1 standalone single ("Burn"), and 1 previously unreleased song ("Non-Entity"). Six of these songs overlap with those in the previously released live footage on Closure, and seven overlap with the And All That Could Have Been DVD.

== Differences between formats ==
Though the video content of each format does not vary (aside from variances in resolution, bitrate and functionality), the Blu-ray disc is the most technically advanced product ever released in that format and has a "slight technical edge" over its HD DVD counterpart, according to comments made by video director Rob Sheridan on The Spiral. High-Def Digest reviewer Peter Bracke described both of the high-definition versions as "the best music performance yet released" in the consumer HD format. To accommodate the highly frenetic and difficult to compress video imagery of a live Nine Inch Nails show, Microsoft modified its high-definition VC-1 video encoder and Sonic Solutions also accelerated development of their Sonic Scenarist authoring software especially for this release.

Each version of the video contains closed captioned on-screen lyrics and video content in the 16x9 aspect ratio; however, only the standard DVD contains an interactive discography due to time constraints. All three formats have Dolby Digital soundtracks for the main feature, in both stereo (mixed by Dave Ogilvie) and 5.1 surround sound (mixed by Elliot Scheiner); in addition, they include higher-resolution versions of the surround audio mix: either DTS on the DVD, or Dolby TrueHD on the Blu-ray and HD DVD.

The DVD packaging is housed in a digipak, whereas the other two discs are in format-labeled plastic cases (i.e. red for HD DVD and blue for Blu-ray); more specific differences between formats are detailed on the release's micro-site FAQ. The packaging insert for the Blu-ray and HD DVD releases contains a hidden message related to the Year Zero ARG, which does not appear on the DVD release's insert.

== Issues with certain Blu-ray players ==
The Blu-ray release is encoded at 1080p30, which is not supported by the Blu-ray specification. For this reason, the disc had to be flagged as 1080i60. This means that Blu-ray disc players that only read the flag to decide the format, rather than also checking the content, are only able to play this disc at 1080i60 or lower (e.g. the Sony PlayStation 3).

== Critical reception ==
Professional ratings
Review scores
Source	Rating
Drowned in Sound	7/10
PopMatters	9/10

Tim O'Neil of PopMatters described the album as "the most impressive and meticulous live music DVD presentations ever released." Peter M. Bracke of Hi-Def Digest wrote in his review that Beside You in Time was "a must for any Nine Inch Nails fan" and described the Blu-ray edition of it as "true next-gen event."

== Track listing ==
=== North American Winter Tour 2006 ===
1. "Love Is Not Enough"
2. "You Know What You Are?"
3. "Terrible Lie"
4. "The Line Begins to Blur"
5. "March of the Pigs"
6. "Something I Can Never Have"
7. "Closer"
8. "Burn"
9. "Gave Up"
10. "Eraser"
11. "Right Where It Belongs"
12. "Beside You in Time"
13. "With Teeth"
14. "Wish"
15. "Only"
16. "The Big Come Down"
17. "Hurt"
18. "The Hand That Feeds"
19. "Head Like a Hole"

=== North American Summer Tour 2006 ===
1. "Somewhat Damaged"
2. "Closer"
3. "Help Me I Am in Hell"
4. "Non-Entity"
5. "Only"

=== Music Videos ===
1. "The Hand That Feeds"
2. "Only"

=== Studio Rehearsals 2005 ===
1. "The Collector"
2. "Every Day Is Exactly the Same"
3. "Love Is Not Enough"

There is also an image gallery (available in high-definition) and several standard-definition bonus videos included on the release: two music videos with surround sound, which were previously released on DVD singles, and three songs filmed during band rehearsals (in stereo only).

== Personnel ==
- Trent Reznor – lead vocals, guitar, keyboards, tambourine
- Jeordie White – bass guitar, guitar, keyboards, vocals
- Alessandro Cortini – synthesizer, guitar, vocals
- Aaron North – guitar, vocals
- Josh Freese – drums
- Jerome Dillon – drums (on 2005 footage only)

== Charts ==
=== Weekly charts ===
Chart (2007)	Peak position
Australian Music DVD (ARIA)	1
Austrian Music DVD (Ö3 Austria)	3
Belgian Music DVD (Ultratop Flanders)	6
Belgian Music DVD (Ultratop Wallonia)	8
Danish Music DVD (Hitlisten)	5
Finnish Music DVD (Suomen virallinen lista)	1
German Albums (Offizielle Top 100)	99
Hungarian Music DVD (MAHASZ)	9
Irish Music DVD (IRMA)	1
Italian Music DVD (FIMI)	5
Japanese DVD (Oricon)	77
Portuguese Music DVD (AFP)	7
Spanish Music DVD (PROMUSICAE)	1
Swedish Music DVD (Sverigetopplistan)	3
UK Music Videos (Official Charts)	1
US Music Video Sales (Billboard)	1

=== Year-end charts ===
Chart (2007)	Position
Swedish Music DVD (Sverigetopplistan)	69

== Certifications ==
Region	Certification	Certified units/sales
Australia (ARIA)	Gold	7,500^{^}
^{^} Shipments figures based on certification alone.
