= Closure (video) =

Video by Nine Inch Nails
- Released: November 25, 1997
- Recorded: 1994–95
- Genres: Industrial rock; industrial metal; alternative rock
- Length: 2:06:02 (VHS); 3:23:24 (DVD prototype)
- Labels: Nothing; Interscope; Trimark
- Director: Jonathan Rach
- Producer: John A. Malm Jr.

Nine Inch Nails chronology
Closure (1997)	And All That Could Have Been (2002)

Halo numbers chronology
Halo 11 (1997)	Halo 12 (1997)	Halo 13 (1999)

Professional ratings
Review scores
Source	Rating
AllMusic	4/5 stars
Pitchfork	8.1/10

Closure is the first video album by American industrial rock band Nine Inch Nails, released on November 25, 1997. The double VHS set consists of one tape of live concert and behind-the-scenes footage from their Self-Destruct and Further Down the Spiral tours and one tape of music videos.

The first cassette's footage highlights tour footage and backstage antics by Nine Inch Nails and their tour guests: Marilyn Manson, Jim Rose Circus and David Bowie. One segment in particular, directed by Jonathan Rach, is dedicated to Reznor's penchant at the time for violently destroying keyboards and other tour equipment each show.

The music videos on the second cassette are interspersed with snippets from educational films, as well as exclusive footage shot by Peter Christopherson which is reminiscent of the video for "Closer"; these segments include remixed music from the band's back catalogue, most prominently featuring "A Warm Place" and "The Art of Self Destruction, Final". Closure also contains snippets of the non-commercially released Broken film. Footage from the Edison Manufacturing Company film Electrocuting an Elephant is shown before "March of the Pigs".

According to Russell Mills, who created the artwork, a live album was also planned as a companion to Closure and artwork was made for it, but the idea was scrapped.

== Track listing ==
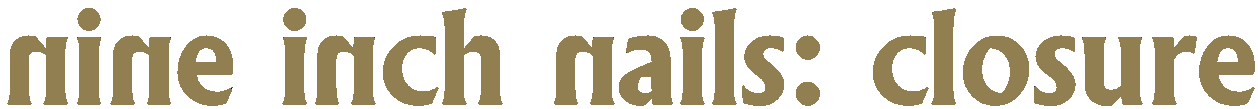
Logo of Closure

=== Self Destruct Tour (tape 1) – Ribbon Wrapped ===
1. "Terrible Lie"
2. "Piggy"
3. "Down in It"
4. "March of the Pigs"
5. "The Only Time"
6. "Wish"
7. "Hurt" (with David Bowie)
8. "Something I Can Never Have"

=== Music videos (tape 2) – 4 Framed ===
1. "Head Like a Hole" – 4:31
2. "Sin" – 2:11
3. "Down in It" – 3:50
4. "Pinion" – 1:16
5. "Wish" – 3:42
6. "Help Me, I Am in Hell" – 2:03
7. "Happiness in Slavery" – 4:48
8. "Gave Up" – 4:27
9. "March of the Pigs" – 3:03
10. "Eraser (Live Version)" – 4:23
11. "Hurt (Live Version)" – 5:10
12. "Wish (Live Version)" – 3:49
13. "Closer" – 4:36
14. "The Perfect Drug" – 4:13

== DVD version ==
In August 2004, Trent Reznor announced a DVD version of Closure, long requested and anticipated by fans, which was to be released in late 2004. It contains over 90 minutes of additional footage compared to the prior VHS release. The deluxe two-disc DVD set, though finished and ready for authoring and release, has been indefinitely postponed by Interscope Records.

A teaser trailer shown on the NIN website included new footage from the 1989 tour, Lollapalooza, Woodstock '94, clips from the making of the "Closer" and "The Perfect Drug" videos, and the unreleased, original versions of the "March of the Pigs" and "Hurt" videos.

=== Earliest live shows/Lollapalooza/Hate 90/Self Destruct Tour (disc 1 additional footage) ===
1. "Now I'm Nothing/Terrible Lie"
2. "Sin" (clip)
3. "Sanctified" (first show)
4. "Down In It" (clip)
5. "Big Man With A Gun" (rehearsal)
6. "Pinion" (clip)
7. "March of the Pigs" (clip)
8. "Get Down Make Love" (clip)
9. "Hurt" original video (making of)
10. "Reptile" (Woodstock 94)
11. "March of the Pigs" original video (clip)
12. "Mr. Self Destruct" (clip)
13. "Closer" (clip)
14. "Wish" (soundcheck clip)
15. "Big Man with a Gun"
16. "The Perfect Drug" (making of)
17. "Something I Can Never Have" (Woodstock '94)
18. "Sex Dwarf" (first show, hidden after stills gallery)

=== Availability ===
In 2006, Disc 1 of a so-called "prototype" edition of the DVD set appeared on the BitTorrent site The Pirate Bay, including the aforementioned bonus content and a still image gallery. The torrent also contains the artwork from the promotional poster that was rendered for the DVD, containing more detail than the original VHS cover. Disc 2 later appeared, including behind-the-scenes footage of the "Closer" video with commentary by Mark Romanek. Both of these discs were submitted to The Pirate Bay (along with the Broken movie DVD "leak") by a user known only as seed0.

Fans speculate that Reznor may have been the source of this leak, based on a post on his official blog: "12/21/06 : Happy Holidays! This one is a guilt-free download. (shhhh - I didn't say that out loud). If you know what I'm talking about, cool." This was later alluded to by Reznor, tongue-in cheek, during an interview: "A couple of years ago around this time of year, somebody must have broken into my personal files and uploaded onto a torrent site the entire DVD of Closure[...] So that basically means that it doesn't need to come out on DVD anymore."

In March 2013, Nine Inch Nails made the tour documentary portion of Closure available for streaming via Vimeo.

== Releases ==
- Nothing Records / Interscope Records INTV2-90157 - VHS
- Nothing Records / Interscope Records VM-6734 - VHS re-release
