= With Teeth =

Studio album by Nine Inch Nails
- Released: May 3, 2005
- Recorded: September–December 2004
- Studios: Grandmaster Recording (Los Angeles); Sound City (Los Angeles); The Village (Los Angeles); Nothing Studios (New Orleans)
- Genres: Industrial rock; alternative rock; electronic rock; new wave; hard rock
- Length: 56:05
- Labels: Nothing; Interscope
- Producers: Trent Reznor; Alan Moulder; Atticus Ross (additional)

Nine Inch Nails chronology
And All That Could Have Been (2002)	With Teeth (2005)	Year Zero (2007)

Singles from With Teeth
- 1. "The Hand That Feeds" Released: March 21, 2005; 2. "Only" Released: July 25, 2005; 3. "Every Day Is Exactly the Same" Released: April 4, 2006

Halo numbers chronology
Halo 18 (2005)	Halo 19 (2005)	Halo 20 (2005)

With Teeth (stylized as [WITH_TEETH]) is the fourth studio album by American industrial rock band Nine Inch Nails, released by Nothing Records and Interscope Records on May 3, 2005. The album was produced by Nine Inch Nails frontman Trent Reznor and long-time collaborator Alan Moulder. It also features contributions from musician Dave Grohl and future band member Atticus Ross.

In line with the band's previous material, the record features introspective songwriting influenced by Reznor's addiction to alcohol and drugs and subsequent sobriety. The album generated three singles: "The Hand That Feeds", "Only", and "Every Day Is Exactly the Same", the latter of which was released as an accompanying remix EP. The album was supported by the Live: With Teeth tour.

With Teeth was well received by critics, albeit slightly less than the band's previous work. Some complimented the aggressive composition, while others said the album was bland and criticized Reznor for a lack of originality. The album became the band's second to reach No. 1 in the U.S. and was certified gold both by the RIAA and BPI and platinum by Music Canada.

== Background ==
Nine Inch Nails garnered mainstream attention with their influential second album The Downward Spiral, as well as a widely broadcast live performance at Woodstock '94, becoming one of the most popular music acts of the 1990s. Reznor appeared in Time magazine's list of the year's most influential people in 1997, and Spin magazine described him as "the most vital artist in music". However, his musical output was infrequent, having released only three studio albums from 1989 to 2005 with a rough average of five years between each release. During this time, Reznor became increasingly addicted to alcohol and drugs, resulting in depression and writer's block. The 1999 Nine Inch Nails double album The Fragile was met with generally positive reviews from music critics and eventually sold 898,000 copies. However, it failed to attain the success of its predecessor and fell from the top of the Billboard charts after only a week. Afterwards, the only original Nine Inch Nails material released until 2005 was the 2000 remix album Things Falling Apart, as well as the 2002 remix album Still and the 2001 single "Deep" from the Lara Croft: Tomb Raider soundtrack. Reznor later recalled that following the The Fragile tour he had reached a personal low point, telling Spin in 2005, "I was going to just drink myself or drug myself out of it. I got back to New Orleans after the Fragile tour, and I'd pretty much lost my soul." Reznor subsequently entered rehabilitation in Florida to address his dependence on alcohol and cocaine. After completing treatment, he began rebuilding his personal and professional life while continuing to work on music. The period marked a major change in his approach to Nine Inch Nails, as he later described With Teeth as being shaped by the transition from addiction to sobriety and by his attempts to understand his identity after recovery. Reznor also spent part of the hiatus working with other artists, including Zack de la Rocha, Maynard James Keenan and the short-lived project Tapeworm, while gradually developing new Nine Inch Nails material.

== Writing and recording ==
Concept art for Bleedthrough by Rob Sheridan

After Reznor decided to go to rehab, he began work on a new album and found that the songwriting process moved along easier for him than in the past. He said that it was due to having "a pretty good game plan" and elaborated, "I had themes and subjects [...] as my brain started working, the songs just started to come out. I regained my self-confidence." He originally planned the album to be a concept album, complete with a storyline. He was quoted in a 2007 article as saying, "I'd come up with this kind of elaborate storyline, and the record was gonna be a concept record that had a number of pretentious elements to it. I was gonna talk about multi-layered reality and waking up in a dream you can't wake up out of, and eventually finding acceptance after you go through this period of trying to fight it. It was all kind of a big analogy for me getting sober."

Pre-production on the album began in 2003. The original title for the album was Bleedthrough, with Reznor stating in an interview in February 2004 that the new material was "more song-oriented than The Fragile. It's much more lean. It's going to be twelve good punches in the face - no fillers, no instrumentals, just straight to the point…It's a complicated concept record, but reduced to just simple songs. It's not epic in its scope. It's minimal and a bit brutal." On October 18, 2004, on the band's website, Reznor announced that the album title had been changed - "Bleedthrough is no more. As the songs and concepts matured, the focus and theme of the album shifted somewhat - leaving me feeling that title was inappropriate. Or you could just say I changed my mind [...] Yes, the new album has a title and track list, and no I'm not telling you what it is yet."

Reznor began recording the album at Nothing Studios in New Orleans, the last release he recorded at the location before permanently relocating to Los Angeles. The album was produced by Reznor and long-time Nine Inch Nails producer Alan Moulder, with engineering and assistance by Atticus Ross, who would later join the band as its second official member in 2016. The album was mixed in stereo and 5.1 surround sound. Nirvana drummer and Foo Fighters frontman Dave Grohl contributed drums and percussion on seven tracks. According to a statement on the official Nine Inch Nails website, Reznor stated that producer Rick Rubin was his "mentor" and "source of inspiration" throughout the planning and writing process of the album.

As production progressed, the album moved away from its original Bleedthrough title and became With Teeth. Reznor said that the completed record was more lyric-oriented than The Fragile and that its songs were more fully developed before the mixing stage, resulting in fewer substantial changes during production. By early 2005, the album had been completed and Nine Inch Nails began rehearsing for its supporting tour, ending the band's prolonged period of inactivity. The resulting album represented a significant shift in Nine Inch Nails' creative process. Whereas The Fragile had been characterized by dense arrangements and extensive studio experimentation, With Teeth emphasized concise songwriting, live performance and a greater sense of immediacy. Reznor's sobriety also became an important thematic influence, although he avoided presenting the album as a conventional recovery narrative. He later described its central concerns as different stages of discovering one's identity in a new life, with sobriety serving as a major underlying influence on the material.

Reznor was heavily inspired by the use of more analog electronic effects and instruments, specifically tape delay and modular synthesizers. A post on the band's official website dated May 5 indicated that Reznor, Ross, and Leo Herrera were in the studio recording and "refining" rough new material. It also stated Jerome Dillon was on drums on these sessions. Mixing began on October 28, and Reznor revealed on New Year's Eve that the album was complete and would be titled With Teeth.

== Composition and lyrics ==
"The Hand That Feeds"
"The Hand That Feeds", the first single from With Teeth.

Prior to its release, Reznor described With Teeth as "more song-oriented" and "lean" than The Fragile (1999). In reference to the album's sound, Reznor said he "tried to keep a lo-fi aesthetic running through it, a kind of carelessness." Moreover, he stated the music was less of a concept album, and more of "a collection of songs that are friends with each other, but don't have to rely on each other to make sense".

With Teeth is considered as Reznor's most rock-oriented record since Broken (1992), being labeled as industrial rock, alternative rock, electronic rock, new wave and hard rock. Its sound is influenced by 1980s synth-pop, which was seeing a resurgence in popularity from new wave revival bands. Trip hop and acid house beats are also present, with musicOMH concluding that With Teeth is "genre-less, but certainly not soul-less" by incorporating drum and bass, pop, electronica and ambient into Nine Inch Nails' industrial rock sound.

The album's lyrics tackle Reznor's opinion of himself, his relationship with the world around him and his place in it, and his struggles with addiction. Although it dealt with these issues, Reznor was hopeful that it was still "disguised enough that [it was] not a terribly boring record about recovery and addiction". Reznor also drew influence from the September 11, 2001 attacks, which occurred shortly after his recovery. The album's first single, "The Hand That Feeds", was a direct example of the themes of protest and propagandist fear that helped influence the album. These influences became more prominent in his next album, Year Zero, and the alternate reality game that accompanied it. In a book about the earlier Nine Inch Nails album Pretty Hate Machine, author Daphne Carr noted that "All the Love in the World" was one of Nine Inch Nails' deeper songs noting the lyrics "Watching all the insects march along, seem to know just right where they belong, smears of face reflecting in the chrome, hiding in the crowd I'm all alone."

== Title and packaging ==
In a statement to fans on the official Nine Inch Nails website, Reznor explained that his dislike for the constraints of CD artwork led to the creation of a downloadable 20-megabyte 3 by 4 feet (0.91 by 1.22 m) poster, incorporating credits, lyrics, and artwork. The poster, designed by Reznor and Rob Sheridan, contains lyrics that are not featured in the actual songs (a practice Reznor has continued since Pretty Hate Machine), as well as song titles and lyrics not featured on the album, possibly recorded but unreleased. The poster is available to members of the official Nine Inch Nails fan club as part of the initial welcome package.

With Teeth is the last Nine Inch Nails studio album to include the Nothing Records logo in the packaging, since it was declared extinct after the February 2007 inclusion of the Beside You in Time home video. Before the release of the album, fans were able to listen to With Teeth in its entirety by attending listening parties that took place in 13 cities throughout the U.S. Anyone who attended received promotional posters and stickers. Those who pre-ordered the album received a limited edition 7" vinyl containing the single "The Hand That Feeds" as well as the B-side track "Home". The album was promoted with seven short teaser trailers. The Fragile, Things Falling Apart, and Year Zero were also promoted with trailers, as well as commercials.

With Teeth was released as a standard CD, double vinyl, a DualDisc and a CD/DVD combo. In addition to 5.1 surround and stereo mixes of the songs, the DualDisc (and DVD) contain the video for "The Hand That Feeds", an interactive discography and a slide show of album artwork. Reznor also released multitrack files for a few of the songs. In retrospect Reznor said, "That whole idea of putting up multitracks, really was just, several years ago, bored in a hotel room [...] just as an experiment I happened to have the multitracks with me—I think I was doing press for With Teeth--I loaded up "The Hand That Feeds" and made it as a multitrack, in GarageBand. [...] I thought it would be cool to give the sounds to people, and I knew the challenge would be to get that past Interscope, essentially giving the masters out. But they agreed." Reznor has released multitrack files for every major Nine Inch Nails release up to, and including, The Slip.

In June 2015, an instrumental version of the album was released to Apple Music. A remastered "Definitive Edition" was released on vinyl and digital in November 2019.

== Live: With Teeth tour ==
Following the release of With Teeth, the live band was reassembled for the Live: With Teeth tour. Since the previous tour five years earlier, much of the band had moved on in their careers, and only drummer Jerome Dillon rejoined. To find replacements, Reznor held auditions during December 2004. He stated that keyboardist Alessandro Cortini "fit in immediately", though he had trouble finding a guitarist to replace Robin Finck until auditioning Aaron North. Jerodie White joined the band on bass.

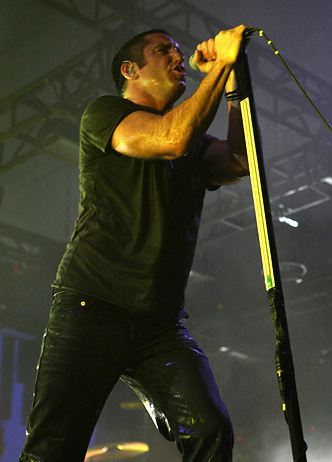
Reznor performing during the Live: With Teeth tour

The tour began with a series of small-club performances early in 2005 with the Dresden Dolls opening. The band told journalists they were "pleasantly surprised by the interest" of fans despite their lengthy absence. This initial leg of the tour also included a headlining performance at Coachella Valley Music and Arts Festival. The band followed with a North American arena tour in autumn 2005, supported by Queens of the Stone Age, Death From Above 1979, Autolux, and Saul Williams. Williams performed on stage with Nine Inch Nails at the Voodoo Music Experience festival during a headlining appearance in hurricane-stricken New Orleans, Reznor's former home. To conclude the With Teeth era of the band, Nine Inch Nails completed a tour of North American amphitheaters in the summer of 2006, joined by Bauhaus, TV on the Radio, and Peaches. The 2007 release Beside You in Time features performances from the North American arena tour, the North American amphitheater tour, and a number of studio rehearsals.

Nine Inch Nails were scheduled to perform at the 2005 MTV Movie Awards, but dropped themselves from the show due to a disagreement with the network over the use of an unaltered image of George W. Bush as a backdrop to the band's performance of "The Hand that Feeds". Soon afterwards, Reznor wrote on the official Nine Inch Nails website: "apparently, the image of our president is as offensive to MTV as it is to me". MTV replied by saying they respected Reznor's point of view, but were "uncomfortable" with the performance being "built around partisan political statements". A performance by the Foo Fighters replaced Nine Inch Nails' time slot on the show.

During the first arena performance in 2005, Dillon was forced to stop midway through the show and was subsequently hospitalized. His condition was later diagnosed as a non-life-threatening cardiac disorder, a consequence of his thyroid medication. Dillon later remarked that when he was ready to return he encountered "complete apathy and no sympathy" from Reznor and Nine Inch Nails' management. Reznor in turn wrote that Dillon's "recollection of the events leading to his departure from the band is once again inaccurate". Josh Freese initially replaced Dillon for two shows, then Alex Carapetis filled in on drums for most of the remaining leg of that tour.

== Critical reception ==
Professional ratings
Aggregate scores
Source	Rating
Metacritic	71/100
Review scores
Source	Rating
AllMusic	4/5 stars
Blender	4/5 stars
Entertainment Weekly	B+
The Independent	4/5 stars
NME	7/10
Pitchfork	6.5/10
Q	4/5 stars
Rolling Stone	3.5/5 stars
Uncut	3/5 stars
USA Today	3/4 stars

According to the review aggregator Metacritic, With Teeth received "generally favorable reviews" based on a weighted average score of 71 out of 100 from 22 critic scores. Rolling Stone's Rob Sheffield described the album as "vintage Nine Inch Nails", while Stylus Magazine said "The words 'triumphant return' are apt." Rock critic Robert Christgau gave it a lukewarm review, commenting in The Village Voice, "All pretense of deeper meaning worn into shtick, [Reznor] is left with the aggro mood music that was always his calling." Newsday gave With Teeth a rating of A− and called it "a strong reminder why, despite his lengthy absences, Reznor remains alt-rock royalty." Many reviewers commented upon the lyrics in songs like "All the Love in the World" for their personal and mournful quality.

Other critics panned the album, including the Village Voice critic Edward J. Keyes, who described the album as "all paint-by-numbers with no topography or relief—just one angry distorted chord after another." PopMatters critically slammed the album, summarizing its poor review by simply saying "Trent Reznor has run out of ideas." In the review for AllMusic, editor Stephen Thomas Erlewine was also muted in his praise for the album, claiming that "[It] is the work of a craftsman, a musician who meticulously assembles his work by layering details so densely, there's never a moment on the record where something isn't roiling under the surface, where something isn't added to the mix. He's good at this, though. With Teeth is an impressive achievement technically and the music is generally strong, yet there's a nagging problem – namely, there's nothing new here."

With Teeth was named one of the top 40 albums of 2005 by Spin magazine. The song "The Hand That Feeds" was nominated for Best Hard Rock Performance for the 48th Annual Grammy Awards in 2006. The song "Every Day Is Exactly the Same" was nominated for a Grammy Award in 2007. Pitchfork named "The Hand That Feeds" in its "Top 500 Tracks of the 2000s", at number 406. In 2005, Reznor was nominated by the Billboard Music Awards as the "Modern Rock Artist of the Year".

== Commercial performance ==
With Teeth debuted at number one on the US Billboard 200, selling 272,000 copies in its first week. The album has been certified gold in the United States and the United Kingdom and platinum in Canada.

== Track listing ==
All songs written, composed and performed by Trent Reznor.

No.	Title	Length
1.	"All the Love in the World"	5:15
2.	"You Know What You Are?"	3:42
3.	"The Collector"	3:08
4.	"The Hand That Feeds"	3:32
5.	"Love Is Not Enough"	3:41
6.	"Every Day Is Exactly the Same"	4:55
7.	"With Teeth"	5:38
8.	"Only"	4:23
9.	"Getting Smaller"	3:35
10.	"Sunspots"	4:03
11.	"The Line Begins to Blur"	3:44
12.	"Beside You in Time"	5:25
13.	"Right Where It Belongs"	5:04
Total length:		56:05

Bonus tracks
No.	Title	Length
14.	"Home" (non-US release)	3:14
15.	"Right Where It Belongs" (Version 2) (UK and Japanese releases)	5:04
16.	"The Hand That Feeds" (Ruff Mix) (Japanese-only release)	3:58
Total length:		68:21

- The track "Home" was originally a B-side to "The Hand That Feeds". On CD versions the track is placed after the last track; on vinyl it is placed after "Sunspots". As mentioned above, the UK version also features an additional track, an alternate version of "Right Where It Belongs", and the Japanese version also contains the alternate track, as well as a remix of "The Hand That Feeds" by Photek, bringing its track total to 16.

Note

- Two more tracks recorded during the With Teeth sessions but never made it to the final track listing were "Non-Entity" and "Not So Pretty Now". Those can be found on the NINJA 2009 Tour Sampler.

== Personnel ==
- Trent Reznor – vocals, arranging, performance, songwriting, production, engineering, 5.1 surround mix, sound design, all instrumentals & instrumentation
- Alan Moulder – production, engineering
- Atticus Ross – programming, additional production, sound design
- Leo Herrera – engineering, project coordination
- James Brown – engineering, 5.1 surround mix
- Rich Costey – engineering
- Tom Baker at Precision Mastering – mastering
- Adam Ayan for Gateway Mastering – surround mastering
- Rob Sheridan – design
- Jeremy Berman – drum technician
- Gerch for Drum Fetish – drum technician
- Jerome Dillon – additional drum programming, live drums (7, 14)
- Rupert Parkes – additional programming (1)
- Alien Tom – turntables (1)
- Dave Grohl – percussion (1), drums (2, 3, 6, 9, 10, 11)

== Charts ==
=== Weekly charts ===
Weekly chart performance for With Teeth
Chart (2005–2006)	Peak position
Australian Albums (ARIA)	10
Austrian Albums (Ö3 Austria)	4
Belgian Albums (Ultratop Flanders)	15
Belgian Albums (Ultratop Wallonia)	26
Canadian Albums (Billboard)	2
Czech Albums (ČNS IFPI)	49
Danish Albums (Hitlisten)	28
Dutch Albums (Album Top 100)	34
European Albums (Billboard)	2
Finnish Albums (Suomen virallinen lista)	9
French Albums (SNEP)	12
German Albums (Offizielle Top 100)	9
Irish Albums (IRMA)	7
Italian Albums (FIMI)	14
Japanese Albums (Oricon)	7
New Zealand Albums (RMNZ)	13
Norwegian Albums (VG-lista)	14
Polish Albums (ZPAV)	10
Portuguese Albums (AFP)	18
Spanish Albums (Promusicae)	20
Swedish Albums (Sverigetopplistan)	6
Swiss Albums (Schweizer Hitparade)	13
UK Albums (Official Charts)	3
US Billboard 200	1

=== Year-end charts ===
Year-end chart performance for With Teeth
Chart (2005)	Position
US Billboard 200	80

== Certifications ==
Certifications and sales for With Teeth
Region	Certification	Certified units/sales
Canada (Music Canada)	Platinum	100,000^{^}
United Kingdom (BPI)	Gold	100,000^{*}
United States (RIAA)	Gold	500,000^{^} / 1,100,000
^{*} Sales figures based on certification alone.^{^} Shipments figures based on certification alone.

== See also ==
- Nine Inch Nails discography
- List of Billboard 200 number-one albums of 2005
