= Every Day Is Exactly the Same =

Nine Inch Nails song

Single by Nine Inch Nails

from the album With Teeth
- Released: April 4, 2006
- Recorded: 2004
- Genre: Alternative rock; industrial rock
- Length: 4:56
- Label: Interscope/Nothing
- Songwriter: Trent Reznor
- Producers: Trent Reznor; Alan Moulder; Atticus Ross (additional)

Nine Inch Nails singles chronology
"Only" (2005)	"Every Day Is Exactly the Same" (2006)	"Survivalism" (2007)

Halo numbers chronology
Halo 20 (2005)	Halo 21 (2006)	Halo 22 (2007)

"Every Day Is Exactly the Same" is the third and final single by American industrial rock band Nine Inch Nails from their album With Teeth. It is the twenty-first official Nine Inch Nails release. The commercial single was released on April 4, 2006, as an EP.

The radio single reached #1 on the Billboard Modern Rock singles chart in the Modern Rock Tracks category and #12 in the Mainstream Rock Tracks category. The song also reached number one on the Canadian Singles Chart, and received a nomination for Best Hard Rock Performance at the 49th Annual Grammy Awards. "Every Day Is Exactly the Same" topped Billboard's 2006 year-end Hot Dance Singles Sales chart, and spent 104 weeks on the chart. A music video was planned but scrapped in the post-production stage.

== Video ==
The only officially released image from the production of the scrapped "Every Day is Exactly the Same" music video.

According to The Spiral, the music video for "Every Day Is Exactly the Same", directed by Francis Lawrence, was canceled in post-production. An image of a clapperboard and what appeared to be a water tank with a 3-lead ECG in the background appeared on the official Nine Inch Nails website, but was later taken down.

There is also a studio cut video for the song. It can be seen on Beside You In Time.

== Release and reception ==
AllMusic gave a generally favorable review of the EP, describing its various remixes as "actually better than the original versions". AllMusic described the "Sam Fog vs. Carlos D Mix" of "Every Day Is Exactly the Same" as "sleekly ominous", and concluded that the track rendered "NIN's increasingly claustrophobic, insular music sound fresh again". Pitchfork Media was not as positive towards the last mix, however, labeling it as the most disappointing track on the release and calling it "cold and ordinary". Pitchfork was more positive towards the other tracks however, labeling the El-P mix as "a harrowing (and somewhat cloying) experience" and concluding of the DFA mix that "the treatment works beautifully."

== Use in popular culture ==
- The song is featured in the 2008 film Wanted, where it became the film's most recognizable song.
- The song is played in the CBS series Hawaii Five-0, in the beginning of the 15th episode of the third season, entitled "Hookman".
- The song is played in the series Criminal Minds (first season, second episode, 1 minute 27 seconds in). The episode is titled "Compulsion".
- The drum beats in the song are interpolated in "Wake Up" by British rock band The Vamps.
- The song is played in the animated series Invincible, during the ending montage of the third season finale "I Thought You'd Never Shut Up".

== Formats and track listings ==
All songs by Trent Reznor.

=== U.S. CD EP ===
1. "Every Day Is Exactly the Same" – 4:57
2. "The Hand That Feeds" (DFA Mix) – 9:03
3. "The Hand That Feeds" (Photek Straight Mix) – 7:47
4. "Only" (El-P Mix) – 4:22
5. "Only" (Richard X Mix) – 7:25
6. "Every Day Is Exactly the Same" (Sam Fog vs. Carlos D Mix) – 5:03

=== Japan CD EP ===
1. "Every Day Is Exactly the Same" – 4:57
2. "The Hand That Feeds" (DFA Mix) – 9:03
3. "The Hand That Feeds" (Photek Straight Mix) – 7:47
4. "Only" (El-P Mix) – 4:22
5. "Only" (Richard X Mix) – 7:25
6. "Every Day Is Exactly the Same" (Sam Fog vs. Carlos D Mix) – 5:03
7. "The Hand That Feeds" (Photek Dub Mix) – 7:52
8. "Love Is Not Enough" (Live at Rehearsals) – 3:51

=== Promo 12" ===
(Remixes By Sam Fog And Carlos D. From Interpol)

1. Everyday Is Exactly The Same – Main Mix – 5:03
2. Everyday Is Exactly The Same – Edit – 4:09
3. Everyday Is Exactly The Same – Full Vocals – 4:12

=== Promo CD ===
1. Everyday Is Exactly The Same – Edit – 3:51
2. Everyday Is Exactly The Same – Interpol Mix Edit – 4:09
3. Everyday Is Exactly The Same – LP Version – 4:56

== Personnel ==
- Trent Reznor – vocals and various instruments
- Dave Grohl – drums

== Charts ==
=== Weekly charts ===
Weekly chart performance for "Every Day Is Exactly the Same"
Chart (2006–2007)	Peak position
Canada (Canadian Singles Chart)	1
Canada Rock Top 30 (Radio & Records)	4
US Billboard Hot 100	56
US Alternative Airplay (Billboard)	1
US Dance Singles Sales (Billboard)	1
US Mainstream Rock (Billboard)	12
US Pop 100 (Billboard)	48

=== Year-end charts ===
Year-end chart performance for "Every Day Is Exactly the Same"
Chart (2006)	Position
US Alternative Songs (Billboard)	16
US Dance Singles Sales (Billboard)	1
