= Halo I–IV =

Box set by Nine Inch Nails
- Released: 27 November 2015
- Studio: Blackwing Studios, Roundhouse Studios (London); The Right Track (Cleveland); Synchro Sound (Boston); Unique Recording Studios (New York City)
- Label: The Bicycle Music Company
- Producer: Flood; John Fryer; Hypo Luxa; Keith LeBlanc; Trent Reznor; Adrian Sherwood

Nine Inch Nails chronology
Recoiled (2014)	Halo I–IV (2015)	Not the Actual Events (2016)

Halo I–IV is a box set by American industrial rock band Nine Inch Nails, released exclusively for the Black Friday Record Store Day on 27 November 2015. The box set contains the 1989 original version of the band's debut studio album, Pretty Hate Machine, on 180-gram black vinyl, as well as the original 12-inch singles for "Down in It", "Head Like a Hole", and "Sin" on 120-gram black vinyl.

The title Halo I–IV refers to the first four catalog numbers in Nine Inch Nails' discography.

== Track listing ==
=== Halo I: "Down in It" ===
Side A

1. "Down in It" (Skin)
2. "Down in It" (Shred)

Side B

1. "Down in It" (Singe)

=== Halo II: Pretty Hate Machine ===
Side A

1. "Head Like a Hole"
2. "Terrible Lie"
3. "Down in It"
4. "Sanctified"
5. "Something I Can Never Have"

Side B

1. "Kinda I Want To"
2. "Sin"
3. "That's What I Get"
4. "The Only Time"
5. "Ringfinger"

=== Halo III: "Head Like a Hole" ===
Side A

1. "Head Like a Hole" (Slate)
2. "Terrible Lie" (Sympathetic Mix)
3. "Head Like a Hole" (Clay)

Side B

1. "Head Like a Hole" (Copper)
2. "You Know Who You Are"
3. "Head Like a Hole" (Soil)

=== Halo IV: "Sin" ===
Side A

1. "Sin" (Long)
2. "Sin" (Dub)

Side B

1. "Get Down Make Love"
2. "Sin" (Short)

== Charts ==
Chart (2015)	Peak position
US Top Dance Albums (Billboard)	13
