= Head Like a Hole =

Single by Nine Inch Nails

from the album Pretty Hate Machine
- Released: 1990
- Genre: Industrial rock; electronic rock; industrial dance; alternative rock
- Length: 4:59
- Label: TVT
- Songwriter: Trent Reznor
- Producers: Flood; Trent Reznor; Keith LeBlanc (remix)

Nine Inch Nails singles chronology
"Down in It" (1989)	"Head Like a Hole" (1990)	"Sin" (1990)

Halo numbers chronology
Halo 2 (1989)	Halo 3 (1990)	Halo 4 (1990)

Alternative cover
- International cover

Music video
- "Head Like a Hole" on YouTube

"Head Like a Hole" is a song by the American industrial rock band Nine Inch Nails, released as the second single from the band's debut studio album, Pretty Hate Machine (1989). It enjoyed heavy rotation on the radio at the time of its release, eventually reaching number 9 on Billboard's Bubbling Under Hot 100 chart.

The song has been covered by several artists, including Devo, AFI, Buckcherry and Korn. The song was rewritten as "On a Roll" (performed by Miley Cyrus in character as Ashley O) for the Black Mirror episode "Rachel, Jack and Ashley Too".

== Background ==
Trent Reznor wrote "Head Like a Hole" after having toured in late 1988 as the support act for Skinny Puppy. The song was produced by Reznor, Flood and Keith LeBlanc. "Head Like a Hole" was the last song written for the album and came together quickly in Reznor's bedroom, with his accounts of the process in retrospective interviews varying from it taking "about 15 minutes" to one day. (Note: However, all the claims the song was written in a single day date from decades after the fact. In 1991, much closer to the time period "Head Like A Hole" was written in, Reznor actually said that "Suck" was "the quickest I've ever written lyrics, in four days.")

Reznor said that the song emerged from the feel that "I needed something to kind of break the guitars out and be a bit more aggressive", with the aggression turned up further by producer Keith LeBlanc after Reznor learned that label executives had not liked the early version of his album. The many revisions meant that, despite being one of the first songs Reznor took to Flood, it was finalized later than the rest of the album.

"Head Like a Hole" became the opening track on Nine Inch Nails' debut studio album, and is one of the two Nine Inch Nails songs produced by Flood to appear on Pretty Hate Machine (1989).

== Composition and lyrics ==
"Head Like a Hole" is an industrial rock, electronic rock and alternative rock song, recognized as an "industrial dance anthem". Set in the key of E minor, the song has a tempo of 115 beats per minute. Although one of the more rock-oriented tracks on the album, many elements of electronic and dance music are still present. The lyrics deal with themes of betrayal and angst, consistent with the rest of the album.

== Release ==
Labeled as "Halo 3", "Head Like a Hole" is the third official Nine Inch Nails release, containing remixes of three different songs from Pretty Hate Machine. The single release is longer in duration than the album itself. The single peaked at no. 28 on Billboard's Modern Rock Tracks chart.

A three-track version of this single was released in the UK containing "Head Like a Hole (Opal)" which is not included on the US release. The saxophone on "Release It" can be heard before the drum loop begins. The first track is mistakenly listed as "Head Like a Hole (Slate)" on the sleeve but is actually "Head Like a Hole (Clay)". NME called it "utter crap", while Melody Maker made "Head Like a Hole" their "Single of the Week", with Simon Price describing it as both subversive and unexpectedly commercial as he compared the poppier "radio edit" to Depeche Mode and the 12-inch ("Opal") mix to Revolting Cocks - an "evil" record ending in a "veiled threat".

"Down in It (Shred)" and "Down in It (Singe)" were previously released on the "Down in It" vinyl single; the latter track is extended by 18 seconds. Reznor appended them to the USA version of the "Head Like A Hole" single as "Down In It" had not received a CD release, but after the record label subsequently released "Down In It" on CD, Reznor expressed concerns fans would feel "ripped off" paying for the same tracks twice, saying the three-track UK version with a coloured cover was the way he had intended "Head Like A Hole" to be released. The 11-track US version of "Head Like a Hole" was repackaged and re-released in 2007. This version was also released in the UK, where it failed to reach the Top 40

In Germany, the single was released as "You Get What You Deserve". This release includes four tracks. "Head Like a Hole" was re-issued as a single in Australia in 1995, where it peaked at No. 57 on the ARIA singles chart and spent seven weeks in the top 100. The single was included in the 2015 Record Store Day–Black Friday exclusive box set, Halo I–IV.

== Critical reception ==
In a retrospective review for AllMusic, Steve Huey described "Head Like a Hole" as "grand theater", elaborating further by commenting the "backing music was immaculately crafted and produced". In a review of the 11-track single, David Reamer was largely positive towards the song selection, even saying that the inclusion of "Head Like a Hole", "Terrible Lie", and "Down in It" "renders Pretty Hate Machine mostly unnecessary". He was less positive about the other tracks, adding, "This is one case where quality definitely would have sufficed without the quantity".

In 2020, Kerrang! and Billboard ranked the song at number 8 and number 2, respectively, on their lists of the greatest Nine Inch Nails songs.

== Music video ==
A music video was made for the "Clay" remix of the song. Directed by Eric Zimmerman, it was released in 1990 and again later in 1997 on the Closure VHS. A slightly different edit of the video was also released for Flood's remix of the song, which is 17 seconds shorter than the "Clay" remix. The video features band members Trent Reznor, Richard Patrick, and Chris Vrenna, as well as guest drummer Martin Atkins performing in a cage, with shots of a spinning model head.

The video was filmed at the original location of Exit nightclub which was located at 1653 North Wells Street in Chicago.

Reznor's guitar in the video is a Jackson Dinky, first seen during the first chorus, when Reznor, appearing to be dirty like the other band members (he had long hair and wore gritty clothing during production), bangs his head while singing the chorus. He does not use the guitar in the video's climax, where wires tied to his ankles slowly pull him up, leaving him spinning upside down from the ceiling. In the same scene, Vrenna destroys his drum kit by throwing a bass drum of Atkins' kit towards it. During several shots earlier in the video, broken Zildjian cymbals and a drum machine can be seen as parts of Vrenna's kit.

== Live performances ==
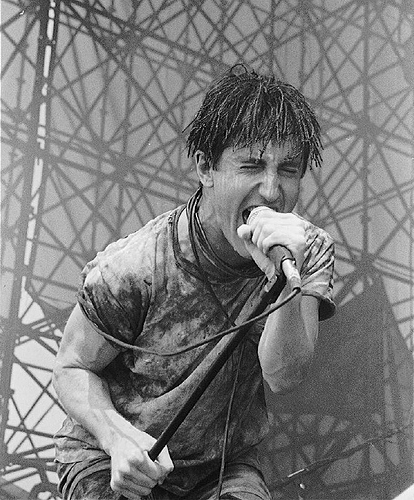
"Head Like a Hole" was one of the most notable moments of Nine Inch Nails' Lollapalooza festival performances.

The song has been the encore for most Nine Inch Nails shows (especially the Pretty Hate Machine Tour Series), or the last song before the encore if an encore took place. There are live videos of "Head Like a Hole" on the DVDs And All That Could Have Been and Beside You in Time.

During Lollapalooza '91, Dave Navarro, Eric Avery, Gibby Haynes and Ice-T joined Nine Inch Nails live performances on-stage as additional guitarists for "Head Like a Hole;" except for the first show in Phoenix, AZ when the band walked off stage after the first song in frustration. For the Nights of Nothing mini-tour in 1996, Richard Patrick made a brief return to the band to perform guitar and vocals on "Head Like a Hole" at the Irving Plaza show in New York along with Clint Mansell, who joined Nine Inch Nails on this song at all three shows of the tour. In the June 7, 2006 radio performance at Atlanta, Georgia, Trent Reznor and Peter Murphy played a reworked version of "Head Like a Hole".

Lisa Kennedy Montgomery once sang the song loudly to Reznor to win a $20 bet. To express the evolving state of his values, Reznor said in 1997 that "I don't want to be singing "Head Like a Hole" at age 50."

== Legacy ==
Since its commercial maxi-single release, "Head Like a Hole" continues to generate an impact on other musicians and bands. New Zealand-based rock band Head Like a Hole is named after the song. The song was ranked at No. 37 on PopMatters' list of "The 100 Greatest Alternative Singles of the ‘80s".

=== Cover versions ===
Honest Bob & the Factory-to-Dealer Incentives released a cover of the song on their 2004 album Second & Eighteen. In 2005, Vitamin String Quartet released a cover album of reworked versions of Pretty Hate Machine songs, including "Head Like a Hole". Other bands who covered the track include American rock band AFI, Ryan Star, new wave band Devo, nu metal band Korn, and hard rock band Buckcherry. American deathcore act Carnifex did a cover of the song on their EP, Bury Me In Blasphemy (2018).

=== In popular culture ===
The song was remixed and rewritten by Charlie Brooker with Reznor's approval as the dance-pop song "On a Roll" for the fifth series episode "Rachel, Jack and Ashley Too" of Black Mirror. The song was released as a promotional single on June 14, 2019. At the end of the episode, American singer Miley Cyrus, in character as Ashley O, performed a cover version of "Head Like a Hole". During her live set at Glastonbury Festival 2019 in Pilton, Somerset on June 30, 2019, Cyrus performed a medley of "On a Roll" and "Head Like a Hole".

=== Controversy ===
"Head Like a Hole" was one of the songs listed by Clear Channel Communications (now iHeartRadio) in their "Songs with Questionable Lyrics" memorandum by after the September 11 attacks, which cautioned stations owned by the company against playing music on the list.

== Track listing ==
=== US version ===
No.	Title	Remixer	Length
1.	"Head Like a Hole" (Slate)	Trent Reznor, Flood	4:19
2.	"Head Like a Hole" (Clay)	Keith LeBlanc	4:32
3.	"Terrible Lie" (Sympathetic Mix)	Reznor, Flood	4:27
4.	"Head Like a Hole" (Copper)	Reznor, Flood	6:27
5.	"You Know Who You Are" (Instrumental Dub mix of "Head Like a Hole")	Reznor, Flood	5:39
6.	"Head Like a Hole" (Soil)	Reznor, Flood	6:39
7.	"Terrible Lie" (Empathetic Mix)	Reznor, Flood	6:09
8.	"Down in It" (Shred)	Adrian Sherwood, LeBlanc	6:52
9.	"Down in It" (Singe)	Sherwood, LeBlanc	7:20
10.	"Down in It" (Demo)	Reznor	3:56
11.	"Untitled" (hidden track)		0:03
Total length:			55:14

=== UK version ===
No.	Title	Remixer	Length
1.	"Head Like a Hole" (Clay)	LeBlanc	4:32
2.	"Head Like a Hole" (Copper)	Reznor, Flood	6:27
3.	"Head Like a Hole" (Opal)	Reznor, Flood	5:17
Total length:			16:14

=== Australian version ===
No.	Title	Length
1.	"Head Like a Hole" (Slate)	4:19
2.	"Terrible Lie" (Sympathetic Mix)	4:30
3.	"Head Like a Hole" (Opal)	5:21
Total length:		14:05

=== "You Get What You Deserve" German promo ===
No.	Title	Remixer	Length
1.	"Head Like a Hole" (Copper)	Reznor, Flood	6:27
2.	"Down in It" (Shred)	Sherwood, LeBlanc	6:52
3.	"Terrible Lie" (Sympathetic Mix)	Reznor, Flood	4:27
4.	"Head Like a Hole" (Clay)	LeBlanc	4:32
Total length:			22:22

== Releases ==
- TVT Records TVT 2614 – US 12" Vinyl
- TVT Records TVT 2615-2 – US CD
- Island Records 12 IS 484 878 893-1 – UK 12" Vinyl
- Island Records CID 482 878 893-2 – UK CD
- Island Records 663 875 – German promo CD

== Charts ==
=== Weekly charts ===
Chart (1990–1991)	Peak position
UK Singles (Official Charts)	45
US Bubbling Under Hot 100 (Billboard)	9
US Alternative Airplay (Billboard)	28
US Dance Club Songs (Billboard)	17
US Dance Singles Sales (Billboard)	34

Chart (1995)	Peak position
Australia (ARIA)	57

=== Year-end charts ===
Chart (2001)	Position
Canada (Nielsen SoundScan)	169
