= March of the Pigs =

1994 single by Nine Inch Nails

- US CD single cover

Single by Nine Inch Nails

from the album The Downward Spiral
- B-side: "A Violet Fluid"
- Released: February 25, 1994
- Recorded: 1993
- Studio: Le Pig (Benedict Canyon, Los Angeles)
- Genre: Industrial metal
- Length: 2:58
- Label: Nothing; TVT; Interscope; Atlantic
- Songwriter: Trent Reznor
- Producer: Trent Reznor

Nine Inch Nails singles chronology
"Sin" (1990)	"March of the Pigs" (1994)	"Closer" (1994)

Halo numbers chronology
Halo 6 (1992)	Halo 7 (1994)	Halo 8 (1994)

"March of the Pigs" is a song by American industrial rock band Nine Inch Nails from their second studio album, The Downward Spiral (1994). It was released on February 25, 1994, as the album's lead single.

== Composition ==
March of the Pigs has an unusual meter, alternating three bars of 7/8 time with one bar of 8/8 to effectively create one long measure of 29/8. The song features a bridge in 4/4 with a vocal melody based on the blues scale that ends with a cheerful piano jingle. This is followed by an unnerving silence before the song repeats itself. The song's high energy (analogous to a previous Nine Inch Nails track, "Wish"), segued by two piano breakdowns, has made it a staple of Nine Inch Nails' live concert performances. It is also one of the band's shortest hit songs, clocking in at just under three minutes.

== Reception ==
March of the Pigs is one of Nine Inch Nails' most well received songs commercially. In 2020, Kerrang! and Billboard ranked the song number three and number six, respectively, on their lists of the greatest Nine Inch Nails songs.

In 2015, Exclaim! proclaimed in a Nine Inch Nails collaboration with the clothing brand N.I.C.E. Collective that they would release March of the Pigs music video replica boots. The boots were called the "Reznor Combat boots." In 2024, Gregory Adams of Revolver called for fans planning to purchase the Dr. Martens a part of the Downward Spiral's 30th anniversary collaboration with Nine Inch Nails to prepare for the 'March of the Docs'.

== Music videos ==
After abandoning a more elaborate version before filming could be completed, Reznor and the live band assembled for the then-impending Self Destruct Tour (featuring drummer Chris Vrenna, keyboard player James Woolley, guitarist Robin Finck and bassist/guitarist/keyboardist Danny Lohner) regrouped with director Peter Christopherson to film a stripped-down, minimalist music video for the song. The video, filmed in 1993 and released in March 1994, features the band performing the song live in front of a white wall backdrop, with Reznor moving around aggressively, pushing the other band members and their instruments, and repeatedly tossing his microphone away. Throughout the video, stagehands visibly move into the frame to reset the equipment he knocks over, handing Reznor a microphone each time he needs to start singing again after an instrumental section.

Cultice's photography on set; (L–R): Woolley, Reznor, Vrenna

The bulk of the video appears to be filmed in one long take, with the camera zooming and panning continuously. When Reznor appeared as a guest programmer on the ABC Rage TV program, he explained that they just kept playing the song over and over to the point of exhaustion to get the final take. The video uses the live performance audio of the song recorded at the video shoot, rather than synchronizing the footage to the studio-recorded version from the album as most music videos do. The bands' personal photographer for their Self Destruct tour, Joseph Cultice, had taken behind-the-scenes photographs of the shoot. He claims that it had taken the band only 5 long take shoots to complete the music video. This version of the song is also included on the "Closer" cassette single.

Portions of the earlier, uncompleted video are included on the Closure DVD disc image file that appeared on file-sharing network The Pirate Bay in December 2006; this file is believed to be a leak of a completed but (so far) officially unreleased deluxe DVD reissue of the band's 1997 VHS/laserdisc long form music video Closure. In this version of the video, the band performs the song in a red cave-like set with water at their feet, and a person with dwarfism appears.

Live performance videos of "March of the Pigs" are included on each of the band's live releases: Closure, And All that Could Have Been, and Beside You in Time.

== The single ==
The American "March of the Pigs" CD single contains two mixes of the title track, two remixes of its fellow The Downward Spiral track "Reptile", and "A Violet Fluid", a non-album instrumental track. In the UK, the single was released as a two-disc (each sold separately) CD single, adding a censored radio edit of "March of the Pigs" and "Big Man With a Gun" from The Downward Spiral. The disc art for this single features a curled-up millipede, an image that was later used on the cover of the single "Closer".

"March of the Pigs" peaked at No. 98 on the Australian ARIA singles chart. It also peaked at No. 59 on Billboard's Hot 100 chart, which was the band's first appearance on the chart. Thirteen years after its release, the single debuted at No. 9 and peaked at No. 6 on the Canadian Singles Chart.

== Track listing ==
=== US CD ===
- Nothing Records / TVT Records / Interscope Records / Atlantic Records 95938–2
- TVT Records / Interscope Records INTDM-95938 (Reissue)

No.	Title	Length
1.	"March of the Pigs"	2:54
2.	"Reptilian" ("Reptile" remixed by Dave Ogilvie)	8:40
3.	"All the Pigs, All Lined Up" ("March of the Pigs" remix)	7:25
4.	"A Violet Fluid"	1:04
5.	"Underneath the Skin" ("Reptile" remixed by Dave Ogilvie)	7:16

=== UK CD ===
- Island Records CID 592 854 001-2 (Disc one)
- Island Records CIDX 592 854 003-2 (Disc two)

Disc one
No.	Title	Length
1.	"March of the Pigs" (clean version)	3:01
2.	"All the Pigs, All Lined Up"	7:25
3.	"A Violet Fluid" (listed as "A Violent Fluid" in UK releases)	1:04
4.	"Big Man With a Gun"	1:37

Disc two
No.	Title	Length
1.	"March of the Pigs" (LP version)	2:54
2.	"Underneath the Skin"	7:16
3.	"Reptilian" (remixed by Ogilvie)	8:40

== Charts ==
=== Weekly charts ===
Chart performance for "March of the Pigs"
Chart (1994)	Peak position
Australia (ARIA)	98
Scotland Singles (OCC)	55
UK Singles (OCC)	45
US Billboard Hot 100	59
US Dance Singles Sales (Billboard)	5
US Cash Box Top 100	38

Chart (2002)	Peak position
Canada (Nielsen SoundScan)	20

=== Year-end charts ===
Chart (2001)	Position
Canada (Nielsen SoundScan)	112

Chart (2002)	Position
Canada (Nielsen SoundScan)	93

== Cover versions ==
- A cover version of "March of the Pigs" has been recorded by Mae for the 2006 compilation Punk Goes 90's.
- Eighteen Visions released a cover version of the song for the Metal Hammer Goes '90s compilation album.
- Inter Arma released a cover version on their 2020 album Garbers Days Revisited through Relapse Records.
- Horse the Band released a cover of the song for their EP Your Fault.
- Car Seat Headrest recorded a cover of the song for their 2021 EP MADLO: Influences, a collection of covers from artists that inspired the sound of their 2020 album Making a Door Less Open.
- Sandrider released a cover version for the 2025 covers compilation The Downward Spiral (Redux).

== Appearances in other media ==
The song was released as a track for the video game Rock Band on February 26, 2008, for Xbox 360 and on February 28 for PlayStation 3. It was available as a standalone download or as part of the 'Nine Inch Nails' song pack (also including "The Perfect Drug" and "The Collector"). It was also featured on Rock Band Track Pack Vol. 1 for the PlayStation 2 and the Wii, alongside the PlayStation 3 and Xbox 360.

In a 1994 episode of Beavis & Butt-head, the boys watch the video for "March of the Pigs" and enjoy much of the song except for the piano parts. After Trent Reznor knocks over his microphone at the end of the video, Beavis says, "Thank you very much. We're Nine Inch Nails." somewhat dismissively, with Butt-head adding "Good night."

In 2024, the song was added to the online video game Fortnite through the Fortnite Festival game mode and as a purchasable jam track. The game uses an extended studio version of the song, featuring a recorded version of the outro typically played at their live shows.
