= Nine Inch Nails discography =

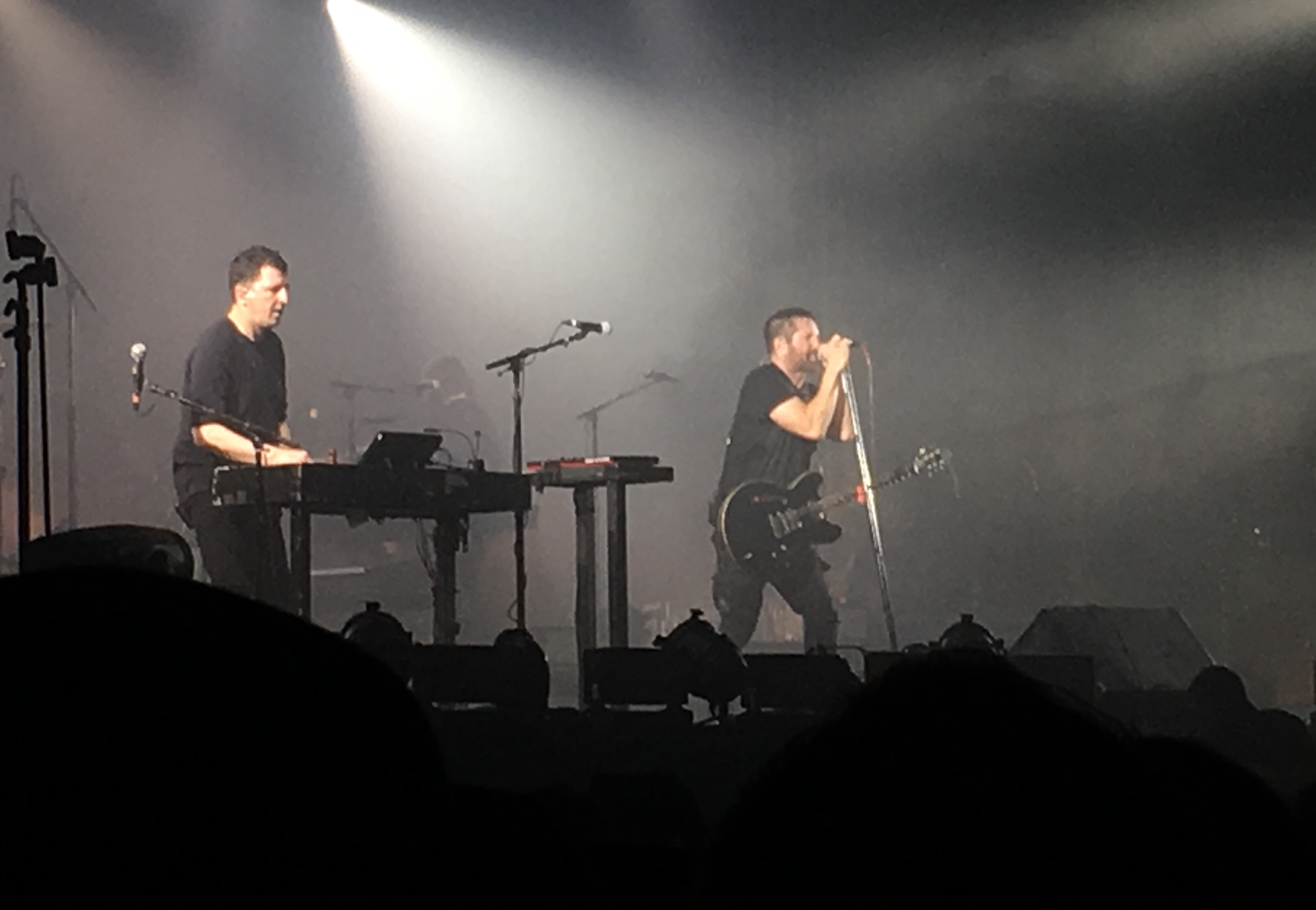
- Nine Inch Nails performing live in 2018.
- Studio albums: 12
- Extended plays: 6
- Live albums: 1
- Singles: 19
- Video albums: 3
- Music videos: 29
- Remix albums: 5
- Compilation albums: 2
- Promotional singles: 10
- Soundtrack albums: 2

American industrial rock band Nine Inch Nails have released 12 studio albums, one live album, five remix albums, two compilation albums, six extended plays, 20 singles, 10 promotional singles, four video albums and 31 music videos. Nine Inch Nails has also contributed to numerous film soundtracks as well as the soundtrack to the video game Quake.

Initial ambitions for Nine Inch Nails in 1988 were to release one twelve-inch single on a small European label. With the addition of future singles "Head Like a Hole" and "Sin", many of these demo tracks would later appear in revised form on the band's debut studio album, Pretty Hate Machine. The album was released in October 1989 and peaked at number 75 on the Billboard 200 the following year. In response to pressures from TVT Records for a follow-up to Nine Inch Nails' commercially successful debut, frontman Trent Reznor began recording the Broken extended play in secret. The EP was released in September 1992 and reached number seven on the Billboard 200. Nine Inch Nails' second studio album, The Downward Spiral (1994), reached number two on the Billboard 200 and has sold over 3.7 million copies in the United States, remaining the band's highest-selling release in the US.

Five years elapsed before Nine Inch Nails' next major album, The Fragile, a double album that debuted at number one on the Billboard 200, selling 228,000 copies in its first week, but dropped from the top 10 afterward. Another six years elapsed before Nine Inch Nails' next studio album, With Teeth, which also debuted atop the Billboard 200. In 2007, the band released their fifth studio album, Year Zero, alongside an accompanying alternate reality game. Reznor announced in late 2007 that Nine Inch Nails had fulfilled its contractual obligations with Interscope Records, and would distribute its next major album independently.

The band's final Interscope release was a remix album based on material from Year Zero. The first Nine Inch Nails album released independently was the instrumental Ghosts I–IV in March 2008, followed two months later by The Slip. Hesitation Marks, the band's eighth studio album, was released in August 2013 through Columbia Records, reaching number three on the Billboard 200. After teasing a release in early 2016, Nine Inch Nails began releasing a trilogy of new releases: the EPs Not the Actual Events in December 2016 and Add Violence in July 2017, followed by the band's ninth studio album, Bad Witch, in June 2018. On March 26, 2020, the band released the albums Ghosts V: Together and Ghosts VI: Locusts as a show of solidarity with their fans during the COVID-19 pandemic.

== Albums ==
=== Studio albums ===
List of studio albums, with selected chart positions, sales figures and certifications
Title	Details	Peak chart positions										Sales	Certifications
Title	Details	US	AUS	AUT	CAN	FIN	FRA	GER	NZ	SWE	UK	Sales	Certifications
Pretty Hate Machine	Released: October 20, 1989; Label: TVT; Formats: CD, LP, cassette	75	—	—	—	—	—	—	—	—	67	US: 3,000,000	RIAA: 3× Platinum; BPI: Gold
The Downward Spiral	Released: March 8, 1994; Label: Nothing, TVT, Interscope; Formats: SACD, CD, LP, cassette	2	12	—	13	—	—	—	23	33	9	US: 3,700,000	RIAA: 4× Platinum; ARIA: Gold; BPI: Gold; MC: 3× Platinum
The Fragile	Released: September 21, 1999; Label: Nothing, Interscope; Formats: CD, LP, cassette	1	2	14	2	10	27	17	28	18	10	US: 898,000	RIAA: 2× Platinum (Note: The Fragile is considered double platinum since it is a double album with length exceeding 100 minutes.); BPI: Gold; MC: 2× Platinum
With Teeth	Released: May 3, 2005; Label: Nothing, Interscope; Formats: CD, LP, cassette, digital download	1	10	4	2	9	12	9	13	6	3	US: 1,100,000	RIAA: Gold; BPI: Gold; MC: Platinum
Year Zero	Released: April 17, 2007; Label: Interscope; Formats: CD, LP, digital download	2	5	4	3	5	17	6	20	7	6	US: 445,000	BPI: Silver
Ghosts I–IV	Released: March 2, 2008; Label: The Null Corporation; Formats: CD, LP, digital download	14	15	58	3	—	—	60	26	—	60	US: 149,000	
The Slip	Released: July 22, 2008; Label: The Null Corporation; Formats: CD, LP, digital download	13	22	45	12	24	177	33	23	35	25	US: 112,000	
Hesitation Marks	Released: August 30, 2013; Label: Columbia; Formats: CD, LP, digital download	3	3	2	1	17	22	5	7	37	2	US: 187,000	MC: Gold
Bad Witch	Released: June 22, 2018; Label: The Null Corporation, Capitol; Formats: CD, LP, digital download	12	9	16	15	—	37	28	—	—	12		
Ghosts V: Together	Released: March 26, 2020; Label: The Null Corporation; Format: Digital download	— (Note: Ghosts V: Together did not enter the Billboard 200, but peaked at number 64 on the Album Sales chart and number 51 on the Current Album Sales chart.)	—	—	—	—	—	—	—	—	—		
Ghosts VI: Locusts	Released: March 26, 2020; Label: The Null Corporation; Format: Digital download	— (Note: Ghosts VI: Locusts did not enter the Billboard 200, but peaked at number 78 on the Album Sales chart and number 60 on the Current Album Sales chart.)	—	—	—	—	—	—	—	—	—		
Nine Inch Noize (with Boys Noize)	Released: April 17, 2026; Label: The Null Corporation, Interscope; Formats: Digital download	151	43	—	—	—	—	—	—	—	— (Note: Nine Inch Noize did not enter the UK Albums Chart, but peaked at number 3 on the UK Album Downloads Chart and peaked at number 2 on the UK Dance Charts)		
"—" denotes a recording that did not chart or was not released in that territory.

=== Live albums ===
List of live albums, with selected chart positions
Title	Details	Peak chart positions									
Title	Details	US	AUS	AUT	CAN	FRA	GER	IRE	JPN	SCO	UK
And All That Could Have Been	Released: January 22, 2002; Label: Nothing, Interscope; Formats: CD, cassette	26; 37 (Note: Two versions of And All That Could Have Been were released, a limited edition and a general release, and each charted separately on the Billboard 200: the limited edition peaked at number 26, and the general release at number 37.)	41	21	17	29	45	75	62	57	54

=== Remix albums ===
List of remix albums, with selected chart positions and certifications
Title	Details	Peak chart positions						Certifications
Title	Details	US	AUS	CAN	FRA	SCO	UK	Certifications
Further Down the Spiral	Released: June 1, 1995; Label: Nothing, Interscope, TVT; Formats: CD, cassette	23	51	46	—	25	—	RIAA: Gold; BPI: Gold
Things Falling Apart	Released: November 21, 2000; Label: Nothing, Interscope; Formats: CD, 12-inch vinyl, cassette	67	59	—	—	85	98	
Year Zero Remixed	Released: November 20, 2007; Label: Interscope; Formats: CD, LP, digital download	77	87	28	183	—	160	
Tron Ares: Divergence	Released: February 27, 2026; Label: Interscope, Walt Disney, The Null Corporation; Formats: CD, LP, digital download	—	—	—	—	—	— (Note: Tron Ares: Divergence did not enter the UK Albums Chart, but peaked at number 22 on the UK Album Downloads Chart.)	
"—" denotes a recording that did not chart or was not released in that territory.

=== Soundtrack albums ===
List of soundtrack albums, with selected chart positions
Title	Details	Peak chart positions									
Title	Details	US	AUS	AUT	CAN	GER	IRE	NL	NZ	SCO	UK
Quake	Released: June 22, 1996 (Note: Initially, the soundtrack for Quake was not officially released as a standalone product; the music was simply included on the PC game's CD-ROM. The soundtrack was officially released for the first time in 2020, issued both digitally and on vinyl.); Label: Interscope, id Software; Video game soundtrack	— (Note: Quake did not enter the Billboard 200, but peaked at number 35 on the US Top Album Sales chart.)	—	—	—	—	—	—	—	51	— (Note: Quake did not enter the UK Albums Chart, but peaked at number 69 on the UK Albums Sales Chart.)
Tron: Ares	Released: September 19, 2025; Label: Interscope, Walt Disney, The Null Corporation; Film score	5	10	11	70	8	34	51	25	5	12
"—" denotes a recording that did not chart or was not released in that territory.

=== Compilation albums ===
List of compilation albums, with selected chart positions
Title	Details	Peak chart positions
Title	Details	US Dance
Halo I–IV	Released: November 27, 2015; Label: The Bicycle Music Company; Format: LP	13
The Fragile: Deviations 1	Released: December 23, 2016; Label: The Null Corporation; Format: LP	—

== Extended plays ==
=== Studio EPs ===
List of extended plays, with selected chart positions and certifications
Title	Details	Peak chart positions								Certifications
Title	Details	US	AUS	AUT	CAN	NZ	SPA	SWI	UK	Certifications
Broken	Released: September 22, 1992; Label: Nothing, TVT, Interscope, Atlantic; Formats: CD, 12-inch vinyl	7	115	—	—	46	—	—	18	RIAA: Platinum; MC: Platinum
Not the Actual Events	Released: December 23, 2016; Label: The Null Corporation; Formats: LP, CD, digital download (w/ physical component)	26	—	—	47	— (Note: Not the Actual Events did not enter the NZ Top 40 Albums Chart, but peaked at number one on the NZ Heatseekers Albums Chart.)	—	—	—	
Add Violence	Released: July 19, 2017; Label: The Null Corporation; Formats: CD, LP, digital download	17	44	67	15	— (Note: Add Violence did not enter the NZ Top 40 Albums Chart, but peaked at number four on the NZ Heatseekers Albums Chart.)	74	36	—	
"—" denotes a recording that did not chart or was not released in that territory.

=== Additional EPs ===
List of extended plays, with selected chart positions and certifications
Title	Details	Peak chart positions			Certifications
Title	Details	US	CAN	NZ	Certifications
Fixed	Released: December 7, 1992; Label: Nothing, TVT, Interscope, Atlantic; Formats: CD, LP, cassette	— (Note: Fixed did not enter the Billboard Hot 100, but peaked at number 35 on the Hot Singles Sales chart.)	6	25	BPI: Platinum
Live 2013 EP	Released: September 10, 2013; Label: The Null Corporation; Format: Streaming	—	—	—	
Remix 2014 EP	Released: January 21, 2014; Label: Columbia; Format: Streaming	—	—	—	
"—" denotes a recording that did not chart or was not released in that territory.

== Singles ==
List of singles, with selected chart positions, showing year released and album name
Title	Year	Peak chart positions										Certifications	Album
Title	Year	US	US Main. Rock	US Alt.	AUS	CAN	DEN	FIN	GER	NZ	UK	Certifications	Album
"Down in It"	1989	—	—	16	—	135	—	—	—	—	—		Pretty Hate Machine
"Head Like a Hole" (Note: "Head Like a Hole" was re-released in Australia in 1995, peaking at number 57 on the Australian chart.)	1990	— (Note: "Head Like a Hole" did not enter the Billboard Hot 100, but peaked at number nine on the Bubbling Under Hot 100 Singles chart.)	—	28	57	103	—	—	—	—	45		Pretty Hate Machine
"Sin"	1990	—	—	—	—	—	—	—	—	—	35		Pretty Hate Machine
"March of the Pigs"	1994	59	—	—	98	20	—	—	—	—	45		The Downward Spiral
"Closer"	1994	41	35	11	3	5	12	—	—	—	25	ARIA: Gold; BPI: Silver; RMNZ: Platinum	The Downward Spiral
"The Perfect Drug"	1997	46	21	11	48	2	13	7	—	32	43		Lost Highway
"The Day the World Went Away"	1999	17	—	—	31	1	—	—	—	15	—		The Fragile
"We're in This Together"	1999	—	21	11	72	50	—	—	—	—	39		The Fragile
"Into the Void"	2000	—	27	11	72	—	—	—	—	—	—		The Fragile
"The Hand That Feeds"	2005	31	2	1	—	2	15	15	62	—	7	BPI: Silver; RMNZ: Gold	With Teeth
"Only"	2005	90	22	1	—	23	—	—	90	—	20		With Teeth
"Every Day Is Exactly the Same"	2006	56	12	1	—	1	—	—	—	—	—		With Teeth
"Survivalism"	2007	68	14	1	—	1	15	7	68	—	29		Year Zero
"Capital G"	2007	—	25	6	—	89	—	—	—	—	140		Year Zero
"Discipline" (Note: "Discipline" was released to radio stations and as a free download on the official Nine Inch Nails site.)	2008	—	24	6	—	—	—	—	—	—	—		The Slip
"Came Back Haunted"	2013	— (Note: "Came Back Haunted" did not enter the Billboard Hot 100, but peaked at number nine on the Bubbling Under Hot 100 Singles chart.)	6	7	—	94	—	—	—	—	—		Hesitation Marks
"Copy of A"	2013	—	—	—	—	—	—	—	—	—	—		Hesitation Marks
"Everything"	2013	—	—	—	—	—	—	—	—	—	—		Hesitation Marks
"Less Than"	2017	—	10	22	—	— (Note: "Less Than" did not enter the Canadian Hot 100, but peaked at number 47 on the Hot Canadian Digital Song Sales chart.)	—	—	—	—	—		Add Violence
"God Break Down the Door"	2018	—	—	—	—	—	—	—	—	—	—		Bad Witch
"As Alive as You Need Me to Be"	2025	—	2	2	— (Note: "As Alive as You Need Me to Be" did not enter the ARIA Singles Chart, but peaked at number 45 on the Australia Digital Tracks Chart.)	—	—	—	—	—	— (Note: "As Alive as You Need Me to Be" did not enter the UK Singles Chart, but peaked at number 12 on the UK Singles Sales Chart.)		Tron: Ares
"—" denotes a recording that did not chart or was not released in that territory.

=== Promotional singles ===
List of promotional singles, with selected chart positions, showing year released and album name
Title	Year	Peak chart positions			Album
Title	Year	US Alt.	US Main. Rock	CAN Alt.	Album
"Physical"	1992	—	—	—	Broken
"Happiness in Slavery"	1992	13	—	—	Broken
"Wish"	1992	25	—	—	Broken
"Burn"	1994	—	—	—	Natural Born Killers: A Soundtrack for an Oliver Stone Film
"Closer to God"	1994	—	—	—	Closer to God
"Piggy"	1994	20	—	—	The Downward Spiral
"Hurt"	1995	8	—	8	The Downward Spiral
"Starfuckers, Inc."	2000	39	—	—	The Fragile
"Deep"	2001	18	37	—	Lara Croft: Tomb Raider – Original Motion Picture Soundtrack
"Echoplex" (Note: "Echoplex", was released as a free download from iLike.)	2008	—	—	—	The Slip
"Burning Bright (Field on Fire)"	2016	—	—	—	Not the Actual Events
"—" denotes a recording that did not chart or was not released in that territory.

=== Collaborative singles ===
List of singles, with selected chart positions, showing year released and album name
Title	Year	Peak chart positions		Album
Title	Year	US	US Alt.	Album
"I'm Afraid of Americans (V1)" (with David Bowie)	1997	66	27	Earthling
"Isn't Everyone" (with Health)	2021	—	— (Note: "Isn't Everyone" did not enter the Alternative Songs chart, but peaked at number 14 on the Alternative Digital Song Sales chart.)	Disco4: Part II
"—" denotes a recording that did not chart or was not released in that territory.

== Chronology ==
Each official Nine Inch Nails release is chronologically ordered with a sequential number prefixed by the word "Halo". These numbers are sometimes modified for alternate versions of a release, such as the multiple releases of The Downward Spiral. Promotional-only releases do not have their own numbers, although the promotional singles for "Piggy" and "Hurt" were both labeled as "Halo Ten", a title later officially used for Further Down the Spiral. A US promo for "Into the Void" is mislabeled as Halo 16 because this number actually belongs to the Things Falling Apart remix album. A similar numbering scheme using the word "Null" follows the releases that were released on The Null Corporation imprint, starting with the soundtrack for The Social Network.

Pretty Hate Machine era (1989–1990)

Further information: Halo I–IV
- Halo 1: "Down in It" (1989)
- Halo 2: Pretty Hate Machine (1989)
  - Halo 2R: Pretty Hate Machine: Remastered (2010)
- Halo 3: "Head Like a Hole" (1990)
- Halo 4: "Sin" (1990)

Broken era (1992)

- Halo 5: Broken
- Halo 6: Fixed

The Downward Spiral era (1994–1997)

- Halo 7: "March of the Pigs" (1994)
- Halo 8: The Downward Spiral (1994)
  - Halo 8 DE: The Downward Spiral: Deluxe Edition, reissue (2004)
  - Halo 8 DVD-A: The Downward Spiral: DualDisc, reissue (2004)
- Halo 9: "Closer" (1994)
- Halo 10: Further Down the Spiral (1995)
  - Halo 10 v2: Further Down the Spiral, European/Australian/Japanese release
- Halo 11: "The Perfect Drug" (1997)
- Halo 12: Closure (1997)

The Fragile era (1999–2002)

- Halo 13: "The Day the World Went Away" (1999)
- Halo 14: The Fragile (1999)
- Halo 15: "We're in This Together" (1999)
  - Halo 15 a: "We're in This Together CD1" (1999)
  - Halo 15 b: "We're in This Together CD2" (1999)
  - Halo 15 c: "We're in This Together CD3" (1999)
- Halo 16: Things Falling Apart (2000)
- Halo 17: And All That Could Have Been (2002), limited edition packaged with Halo 17b
  - Halo 17a: And All That Could Have Been, live CD
  - Halo 17b: Still, limited edition bonus CD

With Teeth era (2005–2007)

- Halo 18: "The Hand That Feeds" (2005)
- Halo 19: With Teeth (2005)
  - Halo 19 DVD-A: With Teeth, DualDisc release
- Halo 20: "Only" (2005)
- Halo 21: "Every Day Is Exactly the Same" (2006)
- Halo 22: Beside You in Time (2007)
  - Halo 22 HD: Beside You in Time, Live Blu-ray

Year Zero era (2007)

- Halo 23: "Survivalism"
- Halo 24: Year Zero
- Halo 25: Year Zero Remixed

Ghosts I–IV era (2008)

- Halo 26: Ghosts I–IV, digital download
  - Halo 26 CD: Ghosts I–IV, 2× CD
  - Halo 26 V: Ghosts I–IV, 4× vinyl
  - Halo 26 DE: Ghosts I–IV, Deluxe Edition
  - Halo 26 LE: Ghosts I–IV, Ultra-Deluxe Limited Edition

The Slip era (2008)

- Halo 27: The Slip
  - Halo 27 CD-LE: The Slip, Limited Edition CD with bonus DVD

Hesitation Marks era (2013)

- Halo 28: Hesitation Marks
  - Halo 28dcd: Hesitation Marks, Deluxe Edition

The Trilogy era (2016–2018)

- Halo 29: Not the Actual Events (2016)
- Halo 30: The Fragile: Deviations 1 (2016)
- Halo 31: Add Violence (2017)
- Halo 32: Bad Witch (2018)

Ghosts V–VI era (2020)

- Halo 33: Ghosts V: Together (2020)
- Halo 34: Ghosts VI: Locusts (2020)

Peel It Back era (2025–2026)

- Halo 35: "As Alive as You Need Me to Be" (2025)
- Halo 36: Tron: Ares (2025)
- Halo 37: Tron Ares: Divergence (2026)
- Halo 38: Nine Inch Noize (2026)

== Other appearances ==
List of non-single appearances, showing year released and album name
Title	Year	Album
"Dead Souls"	1994	The Crow: Original Motion Picture Soundtrack
"Something I Can Never Have" (Edited and Extended)	1994	Natural Born Killers: A Soundtrack for an Oliver Stone Film
"A Warm Place"	1994	Natural Born Killers: A Soundtrack for an Oliver Stone Film
"Deep"	2001	Lara Croft: Tomb Raider
"Theme for Tetsuo: The Bullet Man"	2009	Tetsuo: The Bullet Man
"Zoo Station"	2011	AHK-toong BAY-bi Covered

=== Remixes ===
List of remixes produced by Nine Inch Nails for other artists, showing year released and album name
Title	Year	Artist	Album	Notes
"Light (Fat Back Dub)"	1994	KMFDM	"Light" (single)	
"I'm Afraid of Americans" (V1–V4, V6)	1997	David Bowie	"I'm Afraid of Americans" (single)	Reznor added his vocals to the chorus, making it a duet with Bowie; he also appeared in the music video.
"Victory" (Nine Inch Nails Remix)	1998	Puff Daddy & the Family	Victory (Remixes)	
"Democracy" (NIN Remix)	1998	Killing Joke	Wardance: The Remixes	Alternate versions of this remix appear on the "Democracy" single and promotional releases of the single, credited to Charlie Clouser, Dave Ogilvie and Danny Lohner.
"Deaf Ears (Nine Inch Nails Mix)"	2017	Todd Rundgren	"I Got Your Back (Dam-Funk Refreak)" (single)	

== Videography ==
=== Video albums ===
List of video albums, with selected chart positions
Title	Details	Peak chart positions						
Title	Details	US	AUS	AUT	FIN	IRE	SWE	UK
Closure	Released: November 25, 1997; Label: Nothing, Interscope; Formats: DVD, VHS, ISO image	5	—	—	—	—	—	—
And All That Could Have Been	Released: January 22, 2002; Label: Nothing, Interscope; Formats: DVD, VHS	1	1	—	—	—	1	1
Beside You in Time	Released: February 27, 2007; Label: Nothing, Interscope; Formats: DVD, HD DVD, Blu-ray	1	1	3	1	1	3	1
"—" denotes a recording that did not chart or was not released in that territory.

=== Music videos ===
List of music videos, showing year released and directors
Title	Year	Director(s)	Notes
"Down in It"	1989	Eric Zimmerman and Benjamin Stokes	Extended version also exists.
"Head Like a Hole"	1990	Eric Zimmerman	The audio is the remix "Head Like a Hole" (Clay). Extended version also exists.
"Sin"	1990	Brett Turnbull	The audio is the remix "Sin" (Short). Never aired.
"Pinion"	1992	Eric Goode and Serge Becker	
"Wish"	1992	Peter Christopherson	
"Help Me I Am in Hell"	1992	Eric Goode and Serge Becker	Never aired.
"Happiness in Slavery"	1992	Jon Reiss	Never aired.
"Gave Up"	1992	Jon Reiss	Two versions: One is a performance video with Marilyn Manson and other Nine Inch Nails members which was aired on MTV, another is the conclusion to the Broken film.
"March of the Pigs"	1994	Peter Christopherson and Trent Reznor	Performance video in the studio with the 1994 Nine Inch Nails band.
"Closer"	1994	Mark Romanek	Two versions: Original Version and Nothing Version (unedited and edited, respectively).
"Burn"	1994	Hank Corwin and Trent Reznor	
"Hurt"	1995	Simon Maxwell	
"Wish" (live)	1997		
"Eraser" (live)	1997		Never aired.
"The Perfect Drug"	1997	Mark Romanek	
"The Day the World Went Away"	1999	Tomato	Never aired.
"We're in This Together"	1999	Mark Pellington	Three versions: Short, Long, and Mark Pellington Edit.
"Into the Void"	2000	Walter Stern and Jeff Richter	An alternative version of the video was later released.
"Starfuckers, Inc."	2000	Robert Hales and Marilyn Manson	
"Deep"	2001	Enda McCallion	Two versions are available: Normal and International
"Gone, Still"	2002	Trent Reznor	Live performance of Still material.
"The Becoming"	2002	Trent Reznor	Live performance of Still material.
"Something I Can Never Have"	2002	Trent Reznor	Live performance of Still material.
"The Frail"/"The Wretched"	2002	Rob Sheridan	Video created from live performance footage.
"The Hand That Feeds"	2005	Rob Sheridan	
"Only"	2005	David Fincher	90–95% CGI.
"Right Where It Belongs"	2005	Andrea Giacobbe	
"Eraser" (version 2)	2005	Andrea Giacobbe	
"Every Day Is Exactly the Same"	2006	Francis Lawrence	Video never completed.
"Survivalism"	2007	Alex Lieu, Rob Sheridan and Trent Reznor	First circulated via a USB flash drive planted at a Nine Inch Nails concert.
"Came Back Haunted"	2013	David Lynch	
"Burning Bright (Field on Fire)"	2016		
"Less Than"	2017	Brook Linder	
"This Isn't The Place"	2017	Alex Lieu	
"God Break Down the Door"	2018	Alex Lieu	
"Ahead of Ourselves" (live)	2018	Brook Linder	Performed live during the Cold and Black and Infinite North America Tour.
"Fashion"/"Fantastic Voyage"	2021		Both covers of David Bowie songs, made for the tribute livestream, "A Bowie Celebration: Just For One Day."
"As Alive as You Need Me to Be"	2025	Maxime Quoilin	

Broken, the unreleased short film directed by Peter Christopherson, contains the videos for "Pinion", "Wish", and "Happiness in Slavery" as well as a video for "Help Me I am in Hell" and a different video for "Gave Up" from the one on Closure. The short film contains graphic depictions of a seemingly helpless victim being tortured and forced to watch Nine Inch Nails videos.

== See also ==
- List of songs recorded by Nine Inch Nails
