= Pretty Hate Machine =

Studio album by Nine Inch Nails
- Released: October 20, 1989
- Recorded: May–June 1989
- Studios: Blackwing, London; Roundhouse, London; The Right Track, Cleveland; Syncro Sound, Boston; Unique Recording, New York City
- Genres: Industrial rock; electronic rock; synth-pop; alternative rock; industrial dance
- Length: 48:42
- Label: TVT
- Producers: Trent Reznor; John Fryer; Flood; Keith LeBlanc; Adrian Sherwood

Nine Inch Nails chronology
Pretty Hate Machine (1989)	Broken (1992)

Halo numbers chronology
Halo 1 (1989)	Halo 2 (1989)	Halo 3 (1990)

Singles from Pretty Hate Machine
- 1. "Down in It" Released: September 15, 1989; 2. "Head Like a Hole" Released: March 22, 1990; 3. "Sin" Released: October 10, 1990

Alternative cover
- 2010 remastered version cover

Audio
- "Album" playlist on YouTube

Pretty Hate Machine is the debut studio album by the American industrial rock band Nine Inch Nails, released by TVT Records on October 20, 1989. Since 2011, the album has been released by the Bicycle Music Company. Frontman Trent Reznor sang and played most of the instruments, also producing the album alongside Keith LeBlanc, John Fryer and Flood, with a few other contributors.

The album features a heavily synthesizer-driven electronic sound blended with industrial and rock elements. Much like the band's later work, the album's lyrics contain themes of angst, betrayal, and lovesickness. The record was promoted with the singles "Down in It", "Head Like a Hole", and "Sin", as well as the accompanying tour. A remastered edition was released in 2010.

Although the record was successful, reaching No. 75 in the US and receiving highly favorable reviews from critics, Reznor feuded with TVT over promotion of the album and eventually signed with Interscope Records. Pretty Hate Machine was later certified triple-platinum by RIAA, becoming one of the first independently released albums to do so, and was included on several lists of the best releases of the 1980s. In 2020, Rolling Stone ranked Pretty Hate Machine at number 453 on its "500 Greatest Albums of All Time" list.

== Background ==
"It wasn't like, 'Let's go to the studio and write the record there.' It was like, 'Let's pound these songs over and over until it’s just right and then go to the studio and try to keep some sort of loose, off-the-cuff feel to it.'"

— Trent Reznor

While working nights as a handyman and engineer at the Right Track Studio in Cleveland, Ohio, Reznor used studio "down-time" to record and develop his own music. Playing most of the keyboards, drum machines, guitars, and samplers himself, he recorded a demo. The sequencing was done on a Macintosh Plus. Reznor mainly used an E-mu Emax, Prophet VS, Oberheim Xpander, and Minimoog as synthesizers.

With the help of manager John Malm Jr., he sent the demo to various record labels. Reznor received contract offers from many of the labels, but eventually signed with TVT Records, who were known mainly for releasing novelty and television jingle records. Pretty Hate Machine was recorded in various studios with Reznor collaborating with some of his most idolized producers: Flood, Keith LeBlanc, Adrian Sherwood, and John Fryer. Much like his recorded demo, Reznor recorded Pretty Hate Machine without a conventional band. "A lot of it sounds immature to me now," he stated in 1991 of the recordings that were then two years old. "At first it totally sucked. I became completely withdrawn. I couldn't function in society very well. And the LP became a product of that. It's quite small scale, introverted, claustrophobic – that's the feel I went for."

Reznor discussed the recording and touring of Pretty Hate Machine in the April 1990 issue of Keyboard. He used an E-mu Emax because it produced a high-end buzzing noise when transposing down sounds. Rough and first takes of vocals and guitar were used to contrast the quantized drums and bass. Reznor hated the factory sounds of the Emax but had not transferred anything from his old Emulator, and used samples from his record collection for all the drum sounds. He initially expected to use real drum sounds when recording the album, but in the end he and the producers merely equalized his drum samples. During the recording, Reznor tried to limit himself to two vocal takes, hoping any resulting infections would "express a kind of vulnerability - the idea that I was a person trying to keep my head above water, living in this machine which was moving forward."

After the album was released, a recording known as Purest Feeling surfaced. The bootleg album contains early rehearsal recordings of many of the tracks featured on Pretty Hate Machine, as well as a couple that were not used ("Purest Feeling", "Maybe Just Once", and an instrumental introduction to "Sanctified" called "Slate"). These early songs also featured Chris Vrenna (who initially played keyboards/samplers in the band) and original drummer Ron Musarra.

== Music and lyrics ==
"I wasn't proud of a lot of the things I was saying," Reznor recalled, "but I said to myself, 'Well, no one's going to hear this stuff anyway.' ... The record is honest and that's where its power came from."

— Trent Reznor

Unlike the industrial music of Nine Inch Nails' contemporaries, Pretty Hate Machine displays catchy riffs and verse-chorus song structures rather than repetitive electronic beats. Reznor's lyrics express adolescent angst and feelings of betrayal by lovers, society, or God. Themes of despair are collocated with lovesick sentiments. Pitchfork's Tom Breihan categorized it as a synth-pop album that was shaped by industrial music's "nascent new-wave period rather than its subsequent styles." According to Breihan, the beats were muscular, but not in the vein of metal or post-punk, and that the most rock-inspired song on the album was "Head Like a Hole".

Journalist Jon Pareles described the album as "electro-rock or industrial rock, using drum machines, computerized synthesizer riffs and obviously processed sounds to detail, and usually denounce, an artificial world." Tom Popson of the Chicago Tribune called it a dance album partly characterized by industrial dance's aggressive sound: "Reznor's electronics-plus-guitar LP also carries a brighter techno-pop element that might remind some of Depeche Mode. Things occasionally mellow out to moody atmospherics, while Reznor's vocals range from whispers to screams." Option magazine also characterized Reznor's sound as "industrial dance noise", referring to "Head Like a Hole" and "Terrible Lie" as "techno", but compared the "raspy, angry vocals" to David Lee Roth with "punk intentions". Billboard classified Pretty Hate Machine as "DOR...with an industrial edge", saying "NIN make a stellar bow worth investigating." Spin described the album as "dance music where technology reigns and sexual innuendoes abound", adding, "Trent Reznor's one-man band comes across like an accessible Front 242, an intelligent Nitzer Ebb or a primal screaming Depeche Mode." Retrospectively, PopMatters' AJ Ramirez regarded the album as "a synthesizer-dominated industrial dance record that on occasion slipped under the alternative rock banner."

Reznor has humorously described Pretty Hate Machine as "the all-purpose alternative album," remarking that "if you want to stage dive to it, you can, but if you're a big Depeche Mode fan, you can get what you need out of it as well." Reznor further stated: "I like electronic music, but I like it to have some aggression. That 'first wave' of electro music – Human League and Devo – that's the easiest way to use it. To be able to get some humanity and aggression into it in a cool way, that's the thing ... Pretty Hate Machine is a record you can listen to and get more out of each time. To me, something like Front 242 is the opposite: great at first but, after 10 listens, that's it." Reznor additionally cited Depeche Mode's 1986 album Black Celebration as a driving influence, stating that "DM was one of our favorite bands and the Black Celebration record took my love for them to a new level." In a commentary on the album, Tom Hull said that Reznor's "notion of industrial is closer to New Order new wave, but with a harder metallic gleam and more dystopian attitude."

=== Tracks ===
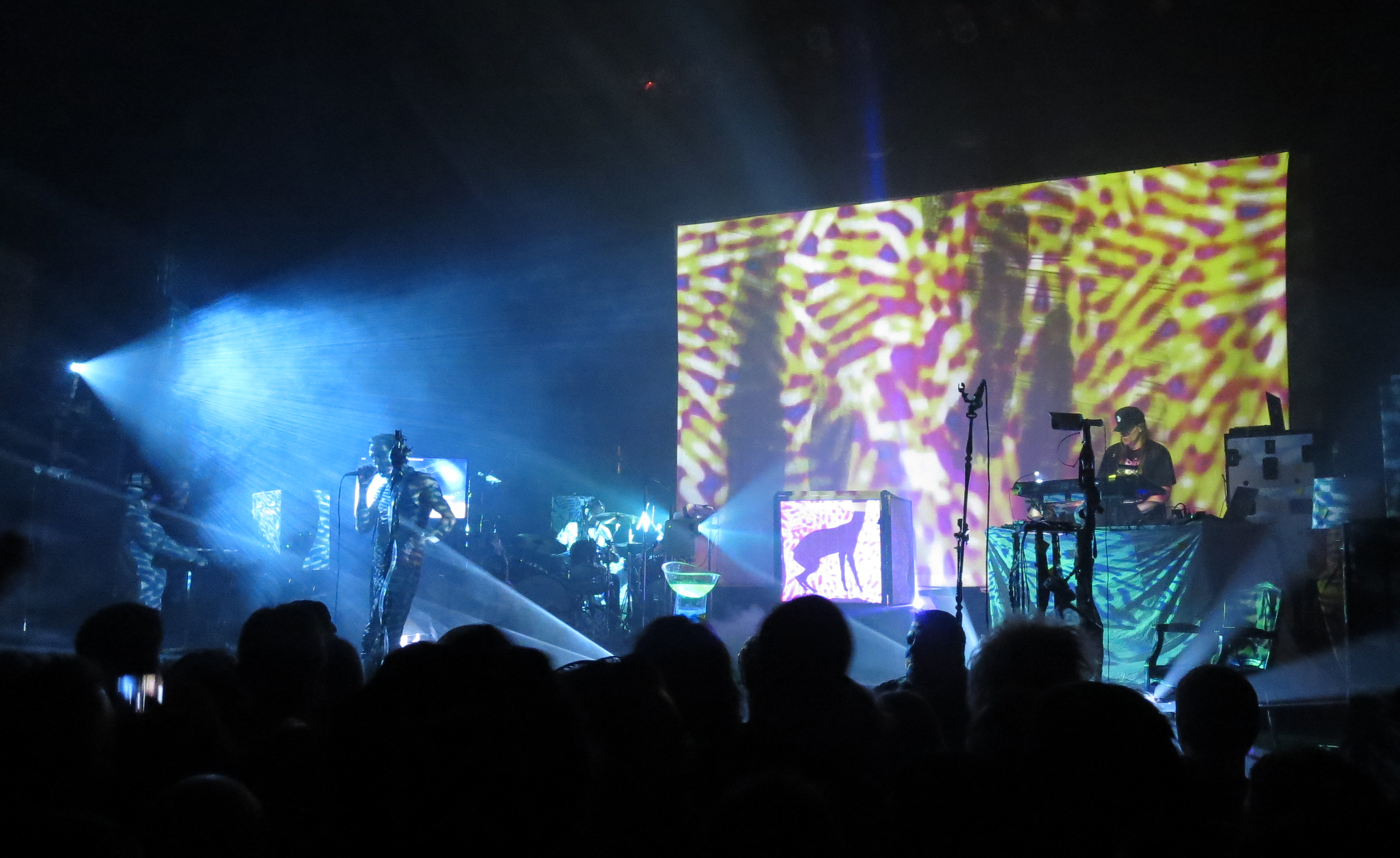
While performing live as an opening act with the band Skinny Puppy in 1988, Reznor began writing his first songs that would eventually be included on Pretty Hate Machine

After touring in late 1988 as the opening act for Skinny Puppy, Reznor wrote "Head Like a Hole", Pretty Hate Machine's first track. He produced the track alongside Flood and LeBlanc. In contrast to the rest of the album, Reznor composed the song remarkably quickly —"in about fifteen minutes in his bedroom". It was among the final tracks completed, partly because Flood did not join the studio sessions until he had finished work on Depeche Mode's Violator (1990). Reznor explained that the song grew out of his desire to "break the guitars out and be a bit more aggressive", while also channeling his concerns that TVT Records might not support him.

The intensity increased even further after he discovered the label was unhappy with an early version of the album, prompting producer LeBlanc to push the aggression to a higher level. "Terrible Lie" was one of the earliest songs written and recorded for the album. Reznor later revealed that "every drum fill on 'Terrible Lie' is lifted intact from somewhere", explaining that fragments of six different songs were playing through the track, recorded to tape and woven in and out depending on what suited the moment. Near the song's conclusion, a harsh, dissonant sound emerges. Reznor described its unusual origin: it began as a simple woodblock, which he ran through a distortion pedal and sampled. He then lowered the pitch by a couple of octaves using his Emax sampler technique, trimmed the attack, and possibly shaped it further with an envelope in Turbosynth. He has called it his favorite sound on the entire record.

Commenting on the lyrics, The Guardian suggested that Reznor takes on a Job-like persona, angrily confronting a God who seems to have abandoned him amid a collapsing world. At the same time, the words can also be interpreted as a broader critique of the broken promises of postwar peace, prosperity, and unity. In a 1989 interview, Reznor identified the track as his favorite on the album. He cited its intensity and aggression as the main reasons, noting that those qualities also made it especially powerful in a live setting. Reznor added that the band’s concerts were often chaotic and high-energy, and the song’s confrontational nature aligned perfectly with that atmosphere.

"Down In It" was the first song Reznor wrote for Nine Inch Nails. During that period, he was heavily influenced by industrial acts such as Ministry and Skinny Puppy. In particular, Skinny Puppy’s track "Dig It" directly inspired the creation of "Down In It", reflecting the strong impact that early industrial music had on Reznor’s developing sound. "Sanctified" is about a "relationship with a cocaine pipe." Reznor stated that while he knew it could be interpreted as being about a relationship with a woman, it was more about drug addiction.

"Something I Can Never Have" is about depression and suicide. Reznor co-produced the song in London alongside John Fryer, though he later admitted that he stepped back somewhat during the process. He felt that Fryer's approach gave the track a distinctly dreamy atmosphere, largely due to the heavily filtered piano and the prominent use of reverb. The recording also incorporates elements from unused backing tracks by This Mortal Coil, a collective that included Fryer. Although these pieces were originally added unintentionally, both producers agreed that they complemented the song and ultimately chose to keep them.

Reznor has described "Kinda I Want To" as particularly difficult to write and has expressed strong dissatisfaction with the final result. He has even referred to it as the weakest track he has ever created. Due to this, he has said that he no longer intends to perform it live, although he has acknowledged that such decisions could change in the future.

"Sin" is a pulsating industrial track that captures the raw turmoil of a toxic, power-imbalanced relationship laced with betrayal, lust, and self-loathing. A notable detail is the line "Stale incense, old sweat and lies, lies, lies," directly quoted from Clive Barker's short story "In the Hills, the Cities" in Books of Blood, adding a layer of literary darkness to the track's atmosphere of faded ritual and deception. The song remains a fan favorite for its danceable aggression and unflinching confrontation with compromised desire and inner conflict. Its music video, featuring fetishistic and ritualistic visuals (including pierced genitals and a bag-over-the-head Reznor being led by a near-naked woman with a halogen lamp), was directed in a provocative style and amplified the song's exploration of control, submission, and eroticized pain—Reznor notably expressed disdain for conventional MTV videos around its release.

"That's What I Get" is the eighth track, and Reznor explained that the song was not initially intended for inclusion on the album, as he considered it more suitable for a B-side due to its lyrical disconnect from the rest of the material. The track stands out for its distinctive "hammering" synth bassline, reminiscent of the one featured in "Kinda I Want To". It also echoes "Down In It" through the reuse of a similar melodic synth voice. An earlier version of the song circulated under the title "I Can Make Myself Forget".

=== Samples ===
Prince, Jane's Addiction, and Public Enemy are listed in the liner notes as artists whose music was sampled on the album. Segments of Prince's "Alphabet St." and Jane's Addiction's "Had a Dad" can be heard in "Ringfinger". Other samples were edited or distorted so as to be unrecognizable, such as the introduction to "Kinda I Want To". "Something I Can Never Have" features unused backing tracks created by John Fryer for This Mortal Coil. Reznor stated, "I was tempted to lay in more of other people‘s stuff, but I thought that would lend a real dated quality to the record, seeing where that has gone the way it has in hip-hop." Time constraints similarly prevented him from accumulating "good sounds" as he wanted. He obtained "weird percussion tracks" by sampling loops from artists like Public Enemy, playing them backwards and modulating them in Macintosh Turbosynth with an oscillator tuned to the pitch of the song, obtaining "this weird flanging-type thing that's in key". He said that "every drum fill on 'Terrible Lie' is lifted intact from somewhere. There are six other songs playing through that cut, recorded on tape, in and out, depending on where they worked."

== Cover art ==
The cover art was designed by Gary Talpas, which is a photo of the blades of a turbine stretched vertically to create the illusion of a rib cage. For the 2010 reissue, visual artist Rob Sheridan was assigned to update the cover art by Reznor to tone down the heavy late-Eighties neon aesthetic. Unfortunately, Sheridan was unable to locate the original artwork as it was deemed lost forever. To remedy this, he had to reverse engineer the cover art by scanning the existing cover art and digitally painted the image in very high resolution. Band photography was done by Jeffrey Silverthorne; his technique of dousing models in cornstarch to create a "corpse-like" pallor inspired Nine Inch Nails to do the same thing for their live performances.

== Touring ==
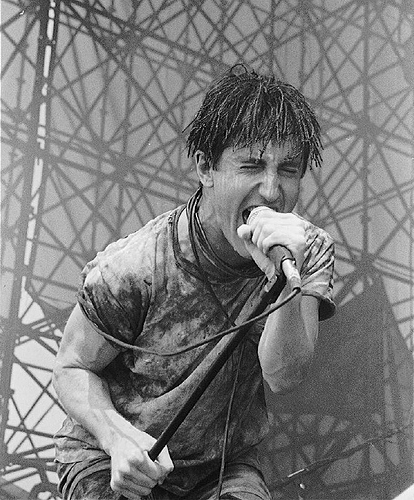
Reznor during the 1991 Lollapalooza festival

"I had a general idea when I was writing the stuff that I thought it would be cool, live. There's an aggressive element in there, plus you get the immediate feedback from the crowd."

— Trent Reznor, 1991.

Reznor assembled the first live lineup in 1988 to support Canadian industrial band Skinny Puppy on tour. The three-piece band consisted of Reznor on guitars and lead vocals, Ron Musarra on drums, and Chris Vrenna on keyboards. The band was only scheduled to play the final six dates of Skinny Puppy's US tour, and they described the performances as "rough." After the Skinny Puppy tour, the band reorganized and expanded to include a fourth member; Musarra left and Vrenna switched to drums, Gary Talpas, Nick Rushe, and later David Hymes contributed keyboards, while Richard Patrick was added as guitarist.

Nine Inch Nails toured North America as the opening act for The Jesus and Mary Chain in 1990, and later for Peter Murphy. During these tours, Reznor began smashing equipment while on stage, and Rockbeat interviewer Mike Gitter attributed the band's early success to this aggressive attitude. In 1991, the band embarked on a world tour that continued until the first Lollapalooza festival, where, according to biographer Martin Huxley, they "stole the show." NME had a feeling after the performance, describing the show as "truly terrifying," and asking the reader to "decide for themselves whether this is choreographed mayhem or rampant serious bodily harm." Nine Inch Nails were invited to open for Guns N' Roses on their European tour, though they were reportedly poorly received once again. Before the Lollapalooza date, Chris Vrenna left the band due to a fight with Reznor, and was replaced for the remainder of the tour by drummer Jeff Ward. Vrenna would rejoin the band for the Self-Destruct tour in 1994. Following the conclusion of the Pretty Hate Machine tour, Richard Patrick left the group to form his own band, Filter.

== Critical reception ==
Professional ratings
Review scores
Source	Rating
AllMusic	5/5 stars
The A.V. Club	B−
Chicago Tribune	2/4 stars
Mojo	4/5 stars
Pitchfork	5.6/10 (2006); 9.5/10 (2010)
Q	4/5 stars
Rolling Stone	4/5 stars
The Rolling Stone Album Guide	4.5/5 stars
Select	4/5
Sounds	4/5 stars

Pretty Hate Machine received widespread acclaim from music critics, who praised the production and Reznor's vocals. In a contemporary review for Rolling Stone, Michael Azerrad called Pretty Hate Machine "industrial-strength noise over a pop framework" and "harrowing but catchy music"; Reznor proclaimed this combination "a sincere statement" of "what was in [his] head at the time". Robert Hilburn found Reznor's "dark obsession" compelling in the Los Angeles Times, while Q's Martin Aston said Reznor "scans the spectrum of modern dance" with a "panoramic vision" that is "both admirably adventurous and yet accessible." Select critic Neil Perry said that record was "a flawed but listenable labour of loathing". Ralph Traitor of Sounds said that "Reznor has guts, and they make his Machine one to be treated with respect", finding that the album was comparable to releases by Ministry and Foetus.

Jon Pareles was less impressed in his review for The New York Times, writing that Pretty Hate Machine "stays so close to the conventions established by Depeche Mode, Soft Cell and New Order that it could be a parody album", but notes, "Luckily, his voice is surrounded by music that has a sure beat and enough unexpected jolts to support his posturing. The Boston Phoenix called Nine Inch Nails "1989's best new artist", Clea Simon comparing the album to The The and Nitzer Ebb - "Or better, Cabaret Voltaire with Matt Johnson stuck painfully and permanently in its machinery." Frank Beeson was more indifferent in Option magazine, describing the album as, "Not everyone's cup of tea, but good for what it is." Mark Jenkins wrote in The Washington Post that the music was "competent but undistinctive stuff" and the "angry denunciations" of songs such as "Terrible Lie" are overshadowed by the "nursery-rhyme" chants of "Down in It". Tom Popson wrote in the Chicago Tribune that "the playing and production get points for introducing some variety to the industrial style, but the moments of soap-on-a-rope singing tend to cancel them out."

In a retrospective review, AllMusic editor Steve Huey commended Reznor for giving "industrial music a human voice, a point of connection" with his "tortured confusion and self-obsession", and felt that "the greatest achievement of Pretty Hate Machine was that it brought emotional extravagance to a genre whose main theme had nearly always been dehumanization." Upon its 2010 reissue, Will Hermes of Rolling Stone called it "the first industrial singer-songwriter album" and commended the sound produced by Flood and Keith LeBlanc, who he said "taught Reznor a lot." Kyle Ryan of The A.V. Club felt that the album "remains the work of an artist just discovering his voice" and said that "20 years later, it doesn't warrant repeat listens like its successors." He found some of its synth and sampled sounds to still be dated after the album's remastering and Reznor's lyrics "mopey" and "silly". In an interview with Blender, journalist and novelist Chuck Palahniuk said that the album "seemed like the first honest piece of music I ever heard." In a 2014 retrospective, Seattle Gay News called the album "one of the best recordings of the '80s, hands down." In 2020, Pretty Hate Machine was included at number 453 on Rolling Stone's "500 Greatest Albums of All Time" list. In 2025, Radio X included the album in its list of "The 25 best indie debut albums of the 1980s". In 2024, Loudwire staff elected it as the best hard rock album of 1989.

=== Commercial performance ===
Released on October 20, 1989, Pretty Hate Machine was a commercial success and entered the Billboard 200 in February 1990. Although it peaked at number 75 on the Billboard 200, the album gained popularity through word of mouth and developed an underground following. Pretty Hate Machine was certified Gold by the Recording Industry Association of America (RIAA) on March 3, 1992, a few years after the album's initial release, for shipping 500,000 units in the USA. Three years later in 1995, it became one of the first independently released records to attain a Platinum certification. It eventually garnered a triple Platinum certification on May 12, 2003, with three million copies sold in the United States. Pretty Hate Machine spent a total of 115 weeks on the Billboard 200 chart, tying their sophomore album, The Downward Spiral as their longest charting effort.

The album was also certified Silver by the British Phonographic Industry (BPI) on November 1, 1995, following its number 67 peak on the UK Albums Chart.

== Reissue ==
Pretty Hate Machine went out of print through TVT, but was reissued by Rykodisc on November 22, 2005, with slightly modified packaging. Reznor had expressed interest in making a deluxe edition with surround sound remastering and new remixes, similar to the rerelease of The Downward Spiral. Rykodisc initially accepted the idea, but wanted Reznor to pay the production costs. On March 29, 2010, the recording rights to Pretty Hate Machine were acquired by the Bicycle Music Company and on October 22, 2010, Reznor announced that a remastered edition would be released the following month. The remaster included new cover art by Rob Sheridan and the bonus track "Get Down, Make Love", a Queen cover originally from the "Sin" single. The 2010 reissue was mastered by Tom Baker at the Precision Mastering in Hollywood, California.

"PHM 2.0 is far brighter and clearer than its original incarnation," observed Classic Rock, "but ultimately it's the strength of the songwriting… that shines through. Although that said, a super bass beef-up job on an already infamous cover of Queen's 'Get Down, Make Love' ups the sleaze 'n' grind quotient no end." Before the album's rerelease, a fan website was launched featuring touring information for Pretty Hate Machine, the videos for "Head Like a Hole" and "Down in It" (with remastered sound), the uncut video for "Sin" (a remix for the video was used) and two early live segments, one with interviews. The album and its respective singles were included in a Record Store Day Black Friday exclusive box set, Halo I–IV in 2015.

== Track listing ==
All tracks are written by Trent Reznor.

No.	Title	Producer(s)	Length
1.	"Head Like a Hole"	Flood; Reznor; Keith LeBlanc^{[a]}	4:59
2.	"Terrible Lie"	Flood; Reznor	4:38
3.	"Down in It"	Reznor; Adrian Sherwood; LeBlanc	3:46
4.	"Sanctified"	Reznor; John Fryer	5:47
5.	"Something I Can Never Have"	Reznor; Fryer	5:54
6.	"Kinda I Want To"	Reznor; Fryer	4:33
7.	"Sin"	Reznor; Fryer; LeBlanc^{[b]}	4:06
8.	"That's What I Get"	Fryer	4:30
9.	"The Only Time"	Reznor; Fryer; LeBlanc	4:47
10.	"Ringfinger"	Reznor; Fryer	5:42
Total length:			48:42

2010 remastered edition bonus track
No.	Title	Writer(s)	Producer(s)	Length
11.	"Get Down Make Love"	Freddie Mercury	Hypo Luxa	4:19
Total length:				53:01

Notes

- ^{^a} signifies an additional remix producer.
- ^{^b} signifies a remixer.

== Personnel ==
Credits adapted from the liner notes of Pretty Hate Machine.

- Trent Reznor – vocals, arrangement, continuity, digital editing, programming (all tracks); production (tracks 1–7, 9, 10); mixing (tracks 2, 6, 7, 10); engineering (tracks 3, 11)
- Tom Baker – mastering (2010 reissue)
- Sean Beavan – engineering (tracks 4, 11)
- Blumpy – remastering preparation
- Tony Dawsey – mastering
- Doug DeAngelis – engineering (tracks 1, 2)
- Flood – production, engineering (tracks 1, 2); additional synth programming
- John Fryer – production, engineering (tracks 2, 4–10); mixing (tracks 2, 4–6, 8–10)
- Hypo Luxa – production, engineering (track 11)
- Kennan Keating – engineering (tracks 1, 3, 6, 7, 9)

- Keith LeBlanc – additional remix production (track 1); engineering (tracks 1, 3, 6, 7, 9); mixing (tracks 1, 6, 7, 9); production (tracks 3, 9); remix (track 7)
- Jeff "Critter" Newell – engineering (track 11)
- Tim Niemi – additional synth programming
- Richard Patrick – drone guitar at end (track 4)
- Ken Quartarone – engineering (tracks 1, 6, 7, 9)
- Rob Sheridan – art direction (2010 reissue)
- Adrian Sherwood – production, engineering, mixing (track 3)
- Jeffrey Silverthorne – portrait photography
- Gary Talpas – original sleeve
- Chris Vrenna – continuity, digital editing

== Charts ==
Chart (1990)	Peak position
UK Albums (Official Charts)	67
US Billboard 200	75

Chart (2010 remaster)	Peak position
UK Rock & Metal Albums (Official Charts)	26
US Independent Albums (Billboard)	17

== Certifications ==
Region	Certification	Certified units/sales
Argentina (CAPIF)	Platinum	60,000^{^}
United Kingdom (BPI)	Gold	100,000^{‡}
United States (RIAA)	3× Platinum	3,000,000^{^}
^{^} Shipments figures based on certification alone.^{‡} Sales+streaming figures based on certification alone.
