= Only (Nine Inch Nails song) =

Nine Inch Nails song

Single by Nine Inch Nails

from the album With Teeth
- Released: July 25, 2005
- Recorded: September – December 2004
- Genre: Dance-rock; new wave revival; synth-pop; dance-punk
- Length: 4:22
- Label: Island; Interscope
- Songwriter: Trent Reznor
- Producers: Trent Reznor; Alan Moulder; Atticus Ross (additional)

Nine Inch Nails singles chronology
"The Hand That Feeds" (2005)	"Only" (2005)	"Every Day Is Exactly the Same" (2006)

Halo numbers chronology
Halo 19 (2005)	Halo 20 (2005)	Halo 21 (2006)

"Only" is a song by American industrial rock band Nine Inch Nails, released on July 25, 2005 as the second single from their fourth studio album, With Teeth. The song reached No. 1 on the Billboard Modern Rock chart, where it stayed for seven weeks, and on the UK Rock & Metal. It was the band's second most successful release in the UK, peaking at No. 20.

== Background ==
Singer Trent Reznor said the song is about the music business clashing with his artistic desires:

When you get on this path of trying to sell records it becomes about selling more records and playing bigger venues. ... It's like, 'Wait a minute!' The goal has to be about making the best music possible or else it becomes something that will make you implode. ... Should I say yes to that Microsoft commercial because I could use a new house? Or do I say no because this is something precious that would be tarnished if I did that? I find myself saying this to record labels and business manager guys, and they're like, 'You won't do what because of what?'

== Recording and release ==
"Only" was the last song completed for With Teeth.

Like the previous single, "The Hand That Feeds", "Only" was only widely released in Europe. European releases include a CD, a DVD, and a 9" vinyl. The only United States release is a vinyl format—a remix record with mixes from Richard X and El-P. Most versions of the single featured "Love Is Not Enough (Live at Rehearsals)", which was recorded live in the studio by the then-current lineup of the band (Reznor, Jerome Dillon, Alessandro Cortini, Jeordie White, and Aaron North).

Like "The Hand That Feeds", "Only" was released as a GarageBand multitrack file, as well as for DigiDesign Pro Tools, Ableton Live, and Sony ACID Pro. A fan remix community page was set up on MySpace.

== Music ==
"Only" has been labeled as dance-rock, dance-punk, new wave revival and synth-pop.

== Music video ==
The music video for "Only", directed by David Fincher and relying almost entirely on CGI created by Digital Domain, shows various objects in an executive's office, such as pin art, Newton's Cradle and laptop screen saver coming to life with the propulsion of the song and was released on July 12, 2005, at NIN.com.

The main focus is Reznor's face in the pinscreen that sits on the desk, which is the only way he appears in the video. The only non-CGI components of the video are a person's hand (Fincher's, who owns the PowerBook in the video) and the cars in the background.

== Track listing ==
Promo (Interscope Records INTR-11468-2)
No.	Title	Length
1.	"Only" (Radio Edit)	4:01

UK single
No.	Title	Length
1.	"Only"	4:24
2.	"The Hand That Feeds" (The DFA Remix)	9:01
3.	"Love Is Not Enough" (Live at Rehearsals)	3:50
4.	"Only" (music video)	4:27

UK single/DVD
No.	Title	Length
1.	"Only"	4:24
2.	"Love Is Not Enough" (Live at Rehearsals)	3:50
3.	"Only" (music video)	4:27

UK 9" vinyl
No.	Title	Length
1.	"Only"	4:24
2.	"The Hand That Feeds" (The DFA Remix)	9:01

12" vinyl and promo CD (Interscope Records B0005465-11)
No.	Title	Length
1.	"Only" (Richard X Remix)	7:24
2.	"Only" (El-P Remix)	4:21
3.	"Only" (Richard X Dub)	7:51
4.	"Only" (Richard X Edit)	3:46
5.	"Only" (El-P Instrumental)	4:21

== Charts ==
=== Weekly charts ===
Weekly chart performance for "Only"
Chart (2005)	Peak position
Canada (Canadian Singles Chart)	23
Canada Rock Top 30 (Radio & Records)	7
Germany (GfK)	90
Ireland (IRMA)	45
Italy (FIMI)	45
Scotland Singles (OCC)	16
Switzerland (Schweizer Hitparade)	87
UK Singles (OCC)	20
UK Rock & Metal (OCC)	1
US Billboard Hot 100	90
US Alternative Airplay (Billboard)	1
US Dance Club Songs (Billboard) Richard X/El-P mixes	34
US Mainstream Rock (Billboard)	22

=== Year-end charts ===
2005 year-end chart performance for "Only"
Chart (2005)	Position
US Alternative Airplay (Billboard)	20

2006 year-end chart performance for "Only"
Chart (2006)	Position
US Alternative Songs (Billboard)	29

== See also ==
- 2005 in music
