= Down in It =

Nine Inch Nails song

Single by Nine Inch Nails

from the album Pretty Hate Machine
- Released: September 15, 1989
- Recorded: 1989
- Genre: Hip hop; industrial dance; rap rock
- Length: 3:46
- Label: TVT
- Songwriter: Trent Reznor
- Producers: Trent Reznor; Adrian Sherwood; Keith LeBlanc

Nine Inch Nails singles chronology
"Down in It" (1989)	"Head Like a Hole" (1990)

Halo numbers chronology
Halo 1 (1989)	Halo 2 (1989)

Music video
- "Down in It" on YouTube

"Down in It" is the debut single by American industrial rock band Nine Inch Nails, released on September 15, 1989. Taken from the band's debut album Pretty Hate Machine, it was the first song ever written by frontman Trent Reznor.

== Production ==
"My very first song was "Down In It." At the time, I was really into Ministry and Skinny Puppy - in fact Skinny Puppy's "Dig It" was the impetus for "Down In It," I'm not ashamed to admit." - Trent Reznor

Reznor, Keith LeBlanc and Adrian Sherwood had completed production on the 12-inch "Down In It" single by June 1989. The outro contains lyrics referencing the nursery rhyme "Rain Rain Go Away".

== Release ==
Initially released only on vinyl, a CD version of the single was later created following the album's success. The first track on the single edition, "Down in It (Skin)", is the mix found on Pretty Hate Machine. The cover art is very similar to Joy Division's first album, Unknown Pleasures, with Joy Division always being cited as an influence by Reznor, and Nine Inch Nails later covered the Joy Division song "Dead Souls" on the soundtrack to the 1994 film The Crow.

== Promotion ==
Around the time of the single's release, the band lip-synced a performance of the song on the dance music show Dance Party USA. Originally thought to be lost, the footage was rediscovered in 2012 and went viral after being uploaded to YouTube. Reznor responded to the video on his Twitter account, saying the band said they'd be interested in appearing on the show "as a joke" because it seemed like "the most absurd choice they could come up with at the time", but were surprised when they were actually booked to play.

=== Releases ===
- TVT Records TVT 2611 – 12" Vinyl (1989)
- TVT Records TVT 2611-2 – CD (1991)

The single was not released in the UK until late 1990, and did not chart there.

The single was included in the 2015 Record Store Day–Black Friday exclusive box set Halo I–IV.

== Music video ==
A music video for "Down in It", filmed on location in the Warehouse District of Chicago, was released in September 1989. It was produced by Jim Deloye and directed by Eric Zimmerman and Benjamin Stokes for H-Gun Productions. Special effects were applied to scenes such as a television set falling forwards and backwards, writing in lights, and strobe flashing. In the video, Reznor runs to the top of a building while Chris Vrenna and Richard Patrick follow him. The original version of the music video ended with the implication that Reznor's character had fallen or jumped off the building, and he was seen lying on the ground with a deathly pallor created by applying starch powder to his face. MTV edited the scene out of all airings. To film the video's ending, Zimmerman and Stokes used a camera tied to a balloon, with ropes attached to prevent it from flying away. Minutes after they started filming, the ropes snapped and the balloons and camera floated away; eventually landing in a cornfield in Michigan. The farmer whose property it landed on handed it to the FBI, who began investigating whether the footage was a snuff film portraying a murder or suicide. The FBI identified Reznor, who later remarked, "Somebody at the FBI had been watching too much Hitchcock or David Lynch or something."

Police distributed flyers asking for leads and were contacted by an art student who worked for H-Gun and recognised the image from the video. Having established Reznor was alive and well, in September 1990, the Chicago Police Department told reporters, "The bottom line is we don't have a body and we don't have mystery or homicide." The television news magazine show Hard Copy covered the story on their March 3, 1991, episode, which Reznor called, "Total junk gossip exploitative journalism. That was the icing on the cake: getting on the worst TV show in America." Despite the sensationalist tone of the report, which likened "Down In It" video footage to a "satanic ritual" of "cult-like murder," the band's label used the controversy as a promotional tool, with clips from the Hard Copy interview included on an Island Records press kit for the UK release of Pretty Hate Machine. Some British music journalists then questioned whether the whole incident had been engineered as a publicity stunt, but Reznor insisted that was not the case, telling Melody Maker: "I swear to God that was accidental - it sounds like the greatest publicity scam, but it wasn't; the whole story's been distorted. ... It's stupid, but true."

At least two versions of the music video exist - one around 3:50 in length using the "Skin" remix also found on the Pretty Hate Machine album and a longer 6:58 edit using the "Shred" remix.

== Critical reception ==
At the time of release, Billboard described the 12-inch single as an "Aggressive midtempo technonumber with an industrial edge that is easily accessible." The single edition of the song was largely panned by AllMusic reviewer Christian Huey, who described the two remixes included as inferior to the original. Since all three tracks were later released on the "Head Like a Hole" single, he labeled the "Down in It" single as "completely superfluous and useful only to NIN completists."

Describing the 6:58 version of the music video in a Billboard review segment for "club-oriented artists", Bill Coleman said, "Hard, funky techno number drives even harder with an appropriate clip that rams the point home with fast editing of potent industrial scenes and images," later simply calling it a "fab video."

Similarities to the song "Dig It" from Skinny Puppy's 1986 album Mind: The Perpetual Intercourse were noted shortly after the single's release. Reznor later admitted his original demo had been "a total rip-off."

== Covers, soundtrack appearances and legacy ==
A "Down in It" remix was used in an early 1990s Gatorade television advertisement. Originally, "Steppin' Out" by Joe Jackson was to be featured in the commercial, but Jackson declined the offer. Reznor unsuccessfully sued the production company that created the commercial for copyright infringement after he saw it in 1993, accusing them of illegal use of the song without permission.

== Track listing ==
All tracks remixed by Adrian Sherwood and Keith LeBlanc.

No.	Title	Length
1.	"Down in It" (skin)	3:48
2.	"Down in It" (shred)	6:56
3.	"Down in It" (singe)	7:03
Total length:		17:47

== Charts ==
=== Weekly charts ===
Chart (1990-1991)	Peak position
US Alternative Airplay (Billboard)	16
US Dance Club Songs (Billboard)	16
US Dance Singles Sales (Billboard)	20

=== Year-end charts ===
Chart (2001)	Position
Canada (Nielsen SoundScan)	185
