= Deep (Nine Inch Nails song) =

Nine Inch Nails song

Promotional single by Nine Inch Nails

from the album Lara Croft: Tomb Raider – Music from the Motion Picture
- Released: 2001
- Length: 4:06
- Label: Elektra
- Songwriter: Trent Reznor
- Producers: Trent Reznor; Alan Moulder

Nine Inch Nails singles chronology
"Into the Void" (2000)	"Deep" (2001)	"The Hand That Feeds" (2005)

"Deep" is a song recorded by American industrial rock band Nine Inch Nails for the soundtrack to the film Lara Croft: Tomb Raider (2001). Because this is a promotional single, it has never been featured with its own official halo and the song "Deep" has never been released on any Nine Inch Nails album, or on any halo-numbered release, although it has its own video directed by Enda McCallion.

== Music video ==
The head-on collision in the "Deep" music video

The video features Trent Reznor as a bank robber who, together with a woman, steals two boxes from the national mint. They believe these boxes contain cash, but instead contain a highly toxic dye, which sprays all over them when they (separately) attempt to open the boxes. Rushing to warn each other, their cars collide head on. The narrative occurs in reverse order during the video, with the car accident at the beginning and the decision by the thieves to retrieve the boxes (to "make a withdrawal") at the end.

== Track listing ==
- US promotional CD single
1. "Deep" (radio edit) – 3:35
2. "Deep" (album version) – 4:06

== Charts ==
Chart (2001)	Peak position
US Alternative Airplay (Billboard)	18
US Mainstream Rock (Billboard)	37
