= Sin (song) =

1990 single by Nine Inch Nails

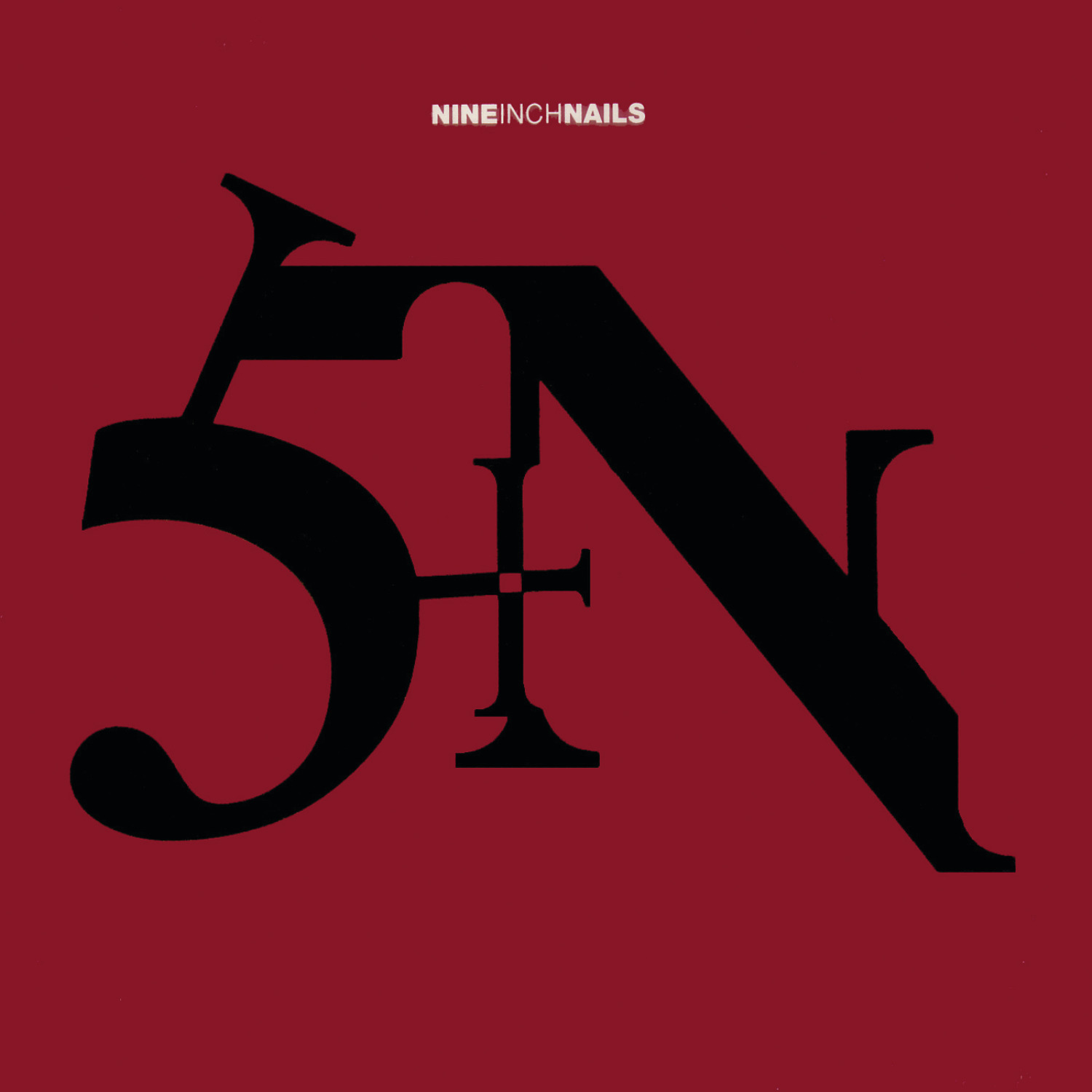

Single by Nine Inch Nails

from the album Pretty Hate Machine
- B-side: "Get Down Make Love"
- Released: October 10, 1990
- Genre: Industrial dance
- Length: 4:06
- Label: TVT
- Songwriter: Trent Reznor
- Producers: Trent Reznor; John Fryer; Keith LeBlanc (remix)

Nine Inch Nails singles chronology
"Head Like a Hole" (1990)	"Sin" (1990)	"March of the Pigs" (1994)

Halo numbers chronology
Halo 3 (1990)	Halo 4 (1990)	Halo 5 (1992)

"Sin" is the third single by American industrial band Nine Inch Nails from the album Pretty Hate Machine (1989). Released in October 1990, the song peaked at number 35 in the UK Singles Chart.

"Sin" has been commonly a staple of Nine Inch Nails live performances for many years; Setlist.fm lists it as the band's ninth most played live song. Its versions on the single differentiate heavily from the album cut, with more an EBM sound with distorted vocals and alternate instrumentation that became the foundation for its many live renditions, as opposed to the synth-pop style featured on Pretty Hate Machine.

== Single ==
Stylized as "5in", it is the fourth official Nine Inch Nails release and final single for Pretty Hate Machine, containing three variations of the track and Nine Inch Nails' first cover song. The spine of the US version refers to the single as "Sin Long, Dub & Short". The lyric "Stale incense, old sweat, and lies..." directly quotes the short story "In the Hills, the Cities" by Clive Barker, from Books of Blood. All three versions were produced by Keith LeBlanc and Adrian Sherwood of Tackhead.

The design of the single was created by The Designers Republic, a British studio known for their unique electronic-oriented aesthetics. Other musical artists associated with the group included Aphex Twin and Pop Will Eat Itself, among others. As well as standard 7", 12", CD, etc formats, the three tracks on Sin were released as a novelty 9" record, described by Andrew Perry in Select as, "Think of Frankie's "Relax", add some angst and multiply by 27." Melody Maker compared the single favorably to Depeche Mode's Violator—the influence of Kraftwerk defaced "with filthy guitar scrawl".

"Get Down, Make Love" is a cover of the Queen song originally released on News of the World. This version of "Get Down, Make Love" samples Dan O'Herlihy from The Cabinet of Caligari, as well as a brief snippet of "We Will Rock You" in the final seconds. It was co-produced by Al Jourgensen of Ministry under the alias of Hypo Luxa and was later released again as a bonus track on the 2010 remaster of Pretty Hate Machine.

The single was included in the Record Store Day–Black Friday exclusive box set, Halo I–IV.

== Music video ==
A music video, directed by Brett Turnbull and produced by Sarah Bayliss was released, using the "(short)" remix of the song. It features two girls dancing with each other at the beginning, cutting to a black-and-white footage of a woman, naked except for what looks like straps to spelunking gear and a halogen lamp, walking a wrist-bound Trent Reznor with a bag over his head through what looks like an industrial warehouse complex and eventually to strap him into an Aerotrim where she spins him throughout the video. These scenes are intercut with two young gay lovers, a man and woman wearing ritualistic dressings and dancing, as well as visuals of a pierced phallus and clitoris, all reflecting the song's dark, sexual aspects.

Though the video never aired, an edited version appears on Closure. The original video later became available through TVT's website.

== Track listing ==
=== US version ===
No.	Title	Remixer	Length
1.	"Sin" (long)	Adrian Sherwood, Keith LeBlanc	5:51
2.	"Sin" (dub)	Sherwood, LeBlanc	5:00
3.	"Get Down, Make Love"	Engineered by Jeff "Critter" Newell, Al Jourgensen, Trent Reznor, Sean Beavan	4:19
4.	"Sin" (short)	Sherwood, LeBlanc	4:19
Total length:			19:29

=== UK version ===
No.	Title	Remixer	Length
1.	"Sin" (short)	Sherwood, LeBlanc	4:19
2.	"Sin" (long)	Sherwood, LeBlanc	5:51
3.	"Get Down, Make Love"	Engineered by Jeff "Critter" Newell, Al Jourgensen, Trent Reznor, Sean Beavan	4:19
4.	"Sin" (dub)	Sherwood, LeBlanc	5:00
Total length:			19:29

== Charts ==
=== Weekly charts ===
Chart (1990-1991)	Peak position
UK Singles (OCC)	35
US Dance Club Songs (Billboard)	10
US Dance Singles Sales (Billboard)	13
