= Jeffrey Silverthorne =

American photographer (1946-2022)

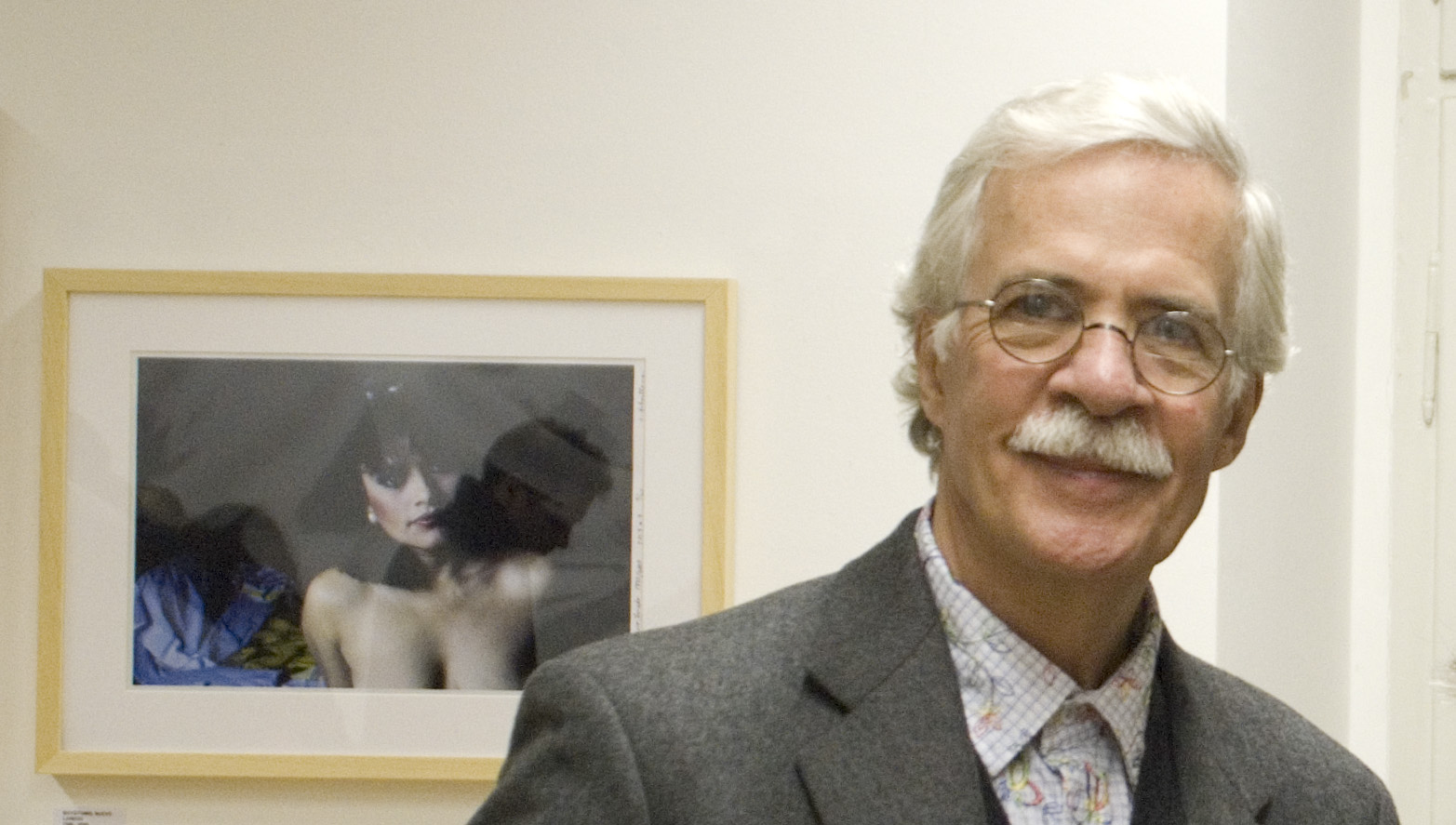
- Jeffrey Silverthorne in 2010
- Born: 1946; Honolulu, Hawaii
- Died: 2022 (aged 75–76); Cranston, Rhode Island
- Known for: Photography

Jeffrey Silverthorne (1946–2022) was an American photographer mainly known for taking pictures of physical and psychological borders, including death and nudity. He was born in Honolulu, Hawaii in 1946, and graduated from the Rhode Island School of Design's BFA, MAT, and MFA programs. He taught at Roger Williams University in Bristol, Rhode Island until 2018.

== Publications ==
- Morgue (2017)
- Jeffrey Silverthorne (Working) (2015)
- Travel Plans (2011)
- Directions for Leaving: Photographs 1971-2006 (2007)

== Public Collections ==
- Museum of Modern Art, New York
- Los Angeles County Museum of Art, LA
- Yale University Art Gallery, New Haven
- Museum of Fine Arts, Boston
- George Eastman House, Rochester
- Museum of Fine Arts, Houston
