= Terrible Lie =

Song by Nine Inch Nails

from the album Pretty Hate Machine
- Released: October 20, 1989
- Recorded: 1989
- Genre: Industrial rock, electronic rock
- Length: 4:38
- Label: TVT
- Songwriter: Trent Reznor
- Producers: Flood, Trent Reznor

"Terrible Lie" is a song by the American industrial rock band Nine Inch Nails, released on the band's debut album Pretty Hate Machine. "Terrible Lie" is frequently regarded as one of the band's best songs, and is among the band's most commonly played songs during concerts.

Nine Inch Nails' frontman Trent Reznor said in a 1989 interview that it was his favorite song on the album, "because of it's [sic] intensity and aggression. It's also my favorite song to perform live. Our shows tend to be violent and this song really fits that image."

== Background ==
The song was among the first to be written and recorded for the album. Reznor has stated that "every drum fill on 'Terrible Lie' is lifted intact from some where. There are six other songs playing through that cut, recorded on tape, in and out, depending on where they worked."

Towards the end of the song, a dissonant sound starts playing. Reznor said "that sound has quite an interesting history. It started out as a woodblock. I ran it through a distortion pedal, sampled it, then did my Emax trick by dropping it down a couple of octaves. Then I chopped off the beginning of it. I might also have put an envelope on it with Turbosynth. That's probably my favorite sound on the record."

The Guardian, commenting on the song's lyrics, stated that "Reznor cuts a Job-like figure, ranting at a God who has turned away from him and a world going asunder – although you could easily read the lyrics as castigating the betrayed promise of postwar peace, prosperity and cohesion."

== Reception ==
Billboard ranked the song 7th on their list of the 25 best Nine Inch Nails songs, while Treblezine stated that "Terrible Lie" is the best song on Pretty Hate Machine, saying "It's all about the eerie chorus, in which a duet of synths casts a mood of darkness and tension rather than destruction or violence. It's the suggestion rather than the blatant display that makes it something special."

Consequence ranked it the fifth best song by the band, saying that it "showcases Reznor's gritty, passionate voice — particularly in the final chorus, where in between shouts, Reznor launches into a viscerally catchy verse shrouded in just enough echo." PopMatters ranked "Terrible Lie" as the sixth best song by Nine Inch Nails, and thought that the last two minutes were among the highlights of the band's discography.

Kerrang! considered the version on Pretty Hate Machine to be "dwarfed" by live performances of the song, noting the rendition on the 2002 live album And All That Could Have Been.

== Covers ==
Glam metal band Trixter covered the song on their Undercovers album, which Reznor considers to be the worst Nine Inch Nails cover, saying "I almost called them up and said, 'I'll pay you if you do not put this out'."

A collaborative cover of "Terrible Lie" has been released by experimental metal band the Body and sludge metal band Thou. The song has also been covered by the industrial metal band Static-X, released as the first single from their 2024 album Project Regeneration Vol. 2.

== Samples ==
"Terrible Lie" was sampled for a battle theme in the 1999 video game Galerians, released on the PlayStation.
