= The Hand That Feeds =

Nine Inch Nails song

Single by Nine Inch Nails

from the album With Teeth
- Released: March 21, 2005
- Recorded: 2004
- Genre: Industrial rock; new wave revival; hard rock
- Length: 3:38
- Label: Interscope
- Songwriter: Trent Reznor
- Producers: Trent Reznor; Alan Moulder

Nine Inch Nails singles chronology
"Deep" (2001)	"The Hand That Feeds" (2005)	"Only" (2005)

Halo numbers chronology
Halo 17 (2002)	Halo 18 (2005)	Halo 19 (2005)

"The Hand That Feeds" is a song by American industrial rock band Nine Inch Nails, released as the lead single from their fourth studio album, With Teeth (2005).

The single is the highest-charting Nine Inch Nails song on all charts except for Billboard Modern Rock Tracks, where it stayed at number one for five weeks (the following single "Only" stayed at number one for seven non-consecutive weeks), and the Billboard Hot 100, where it peaked at number 31. It is the band's only single to reach the top 10 of the UK Singles Chart, as well as their highest-charting single on the U.S. Mainstream Rock Tracks chart, peaking at number two. It was also a crossover hit, crossing over to pop radio as their first top 40 radio hit since "Closer" in 1994 and "Hurt" in 1995, peaking at number 31 on the Billboard Hot 100 chart.

== Release ==
Though several radio stations played a leaked copy of the song in February 2005, official radio play began the following month on March 21. The song was released for sale on both iTunes and Napster the following day. In April, a link to a multi-track GarageBand file of the song was posted on the band's website, allowing anyone with GarageBand to remix it.

The single for "The Hand That Feeds" was only given a wide release in Europe. The European releases include a 3-track limited edition CD, a 2-track standard CD, a 9-inch vinyl and a DVD single. In the United States, "The Hand That Feeds" was released on various vinyl formats. A limited edition 10-inch picture disc and a 7-inch promotional disc (the latter available at With Teeth listening parties) contained the title track and the B-side "Home." Additional 12-inch remix records, containing mixes by Photek and DFA were also available.

The song was nominated for Best Hard Rock Performance for the 48th Annual Grammy Awards in 2006.

In 2009, the song ranked at number 406 in Pitchfork's list of the top 500 songs of the 2000s.

On June 8, 2025, the song was used for the Call of Duty: Black Ops 7 reveal trailer at the Xbox Games Showcase.

== MTV controversy ==
The band was due to play the song at the 2005 MTV Movie Awards, but dropped out due to conflicts between Reznor and MTV concerning his plan to incorporate an image of then-incumbent U.S. President George W. Bush into the performance. An announcement made by Reznor through the band's website on May 26 stated, "Nine Inch Nails will not be performing at the MTV Movie Awards as previously announced. We were set to perform 'The Hand That Feeds' with an unmolested, straightforward image of George W. Bush as the backdrop. Apparently, the image of our president is as offensive to MTV as it is to me. See you on tour this fall when we return to play in America."

The following day, MTV stated, "While we respect Nine Inch Nails' point of view, we were uncomfortable with their performance being built around a partisan political statement. When we discussed our discomfort with the band, their choice was to unfortunately pull out of the Movie Awards." The band was eventually replaced by Foo Fighters at the ceremony.

== Music video ==
The music video for the song was directed by Reznor and Rob Sheridan and debuted on the Nine Inch Nails website. The video features Reznor alongside the band he assembled for live performances at the time (Aaron North, Jeordie White, Jerome Dillon, and Alessandro Cortini) performing the song. The video uses the pan and scan technique, resulting in video distortion such as pixelization and interlacing. During the final chorus, the band members become more distorted by additional interlacing. A second video for the song was directed by Ian Inaba, but was shelved.

== Releases ==
- Island Records CID888 - CD
- Island Records CIDV888 - DVD
- Island Records 9IS888 - 9-inch vinyl
- Interscope Records HALO_18 V2 - 10-inch picture disc (limited edition)
- Interscope Records INTR-11401-7 - 7-inch vinyl (promo)
- Interscope Records B0005127-11 - 12-inch vinyl, Photek remixes
- Interscope Records B0005129-11 - 12-inch vinyl, DFA remixes

== Track listing ==
=== Track listing ===
CD (Available as 2-track standard release and 3-track limited edition digipack)
No.	Title	Length
1.	"The Hand That Feeds"	3:38
2.	"The Hand That Feeds (Straight mix)"	7:46
3.	"The Hand That Feeds (Dub mix)" (limited edition only)	7:52

DVD (includes poster)
No.	Title	Length
1.	"The Hand That Feeds (Video)"
2.	"The Hand That Feeds"
3.	"The Hand That Feeds (Straight Mix)"

9-inch vinyl
No.	Title	Length
1.	"The Hand That Feeds"
2.	"The Hand That Feeds (Dub Mix)"

10-inch picture disc and 7-inch promotional vinyl
No.	Title	Length
1.	"The Hand That Feeds"
2.	"Home"	3:12

12-inch Photek remixes
No.	Title	Length
1.	"The Hand That Feeds (Straight Mix)"
2.	"The Hand That Feeds (Ruff Mix)"	3:58
3.	"The Hand That Feeds (Dub Instrumental)"	7:51
4.	"The Hand That Feeds"

12-inch DFA remixes
No.	Title	Length
1.	"The Hand That Feeds (DFA Remix)"	9:02
2.	"The Hand That Feeds (DFA Remix Instrumental)"	9:01
3.	"The Hand That Feeds (DFA Version I)"	14:12

== Charts ==
=== Weekly charts ===
Weekly chart performance for "The Hand That Feeds"
Chart (2005)	Peak position
Austria (Ö3 Austria Top 40)	41
Belgium (Ultratip Bubbling Under Wallonia)	17
Canada (Canadian Singles Chart)	2
Canada Rock Top 30 (Radio & Records)	8
Denmark (Tracklisten)	15
Europe (Eurochart Hot 100)	20
Finland (Suomen virallinen lista)	15
Germany (GfK)	62
Hungary (Single Top 40)	5
Ireland (IRMA)	28
Italy (FIMI)	15
Norway (VG-lista)	17
Scottish Singles Sales (Official Charts)	6
Sweden (Sverigetopplistan)	36
Switzerland (Schweizer Hitparade)	67
UK Singles (Official Charts)	7
UK Hip Hop/R&B (OCC)	3
UK Rock & Metal (Official Charts)	1
US Billboard Hot 100	31
US Alternative Airplay (Billboard)	1
US Dance Club Songs (Billboard) Photek/DFA mixes	30
US Mainstream Rock (Billboard)	2
US Pop 100 (Billboard)	31

=== Year-end charts ===
Year-end chart performance for "The Hand That Feeds"
Chart (2005)	Position
US Alternative Songs (Billboard)	3

== Certifications ==
Certifications for "The Hand That Feeds"
Region	Certification	Certified units/sales
New Zealand (RMNZ)	Gold	15,000^{‡}
United Kingdom (BPI)	Silver	200,000^{‡}
^{‡} Sales+streaming figures based on certification alone.

== See also ==
- List of anti-war songs
