= Something I Can Never Have =

Nine Inch Nails song

Song by Nine Inch Nails

from the album Pretty Hate Machine
- Released: October 20, 1989
- Genre: Industrial rock; alternative rock; avant-garde; minimal
- Length: 5:55
- Label: TVT
- Songwriter: Trent Reznor
- Producers: Trent Reznor; John Fryer

"Something I Can Never Have" is the fifth track by industrial rock band Nine Inch Nails from the 1989 debut album, Pretty Hate Machine. According to Loren Coleman, the song deals with suicidal themes.

A "deconstructed" version of the song was also included in the live album And All That Could Have Been. The accompanying live music video, with Jerome Dillon was also released. A version of the song with an alternate ending was used in the 1994 film Natural Born Killers.

== Background ==
Trent Reznor co-produced the track in London with John Fryer, although Reznor "kind of backed away" from it. He felt that Fryer's production gave the track a "dreamy quality", as the piano is heavily filtered and features a large amount of reverb. The track also features elements of unused backing tracks by This Mortal Coil, a music collective that Fryer was part of; while these were initially included by accident, both Reznor and Fryer felt they fit well in the track.

Following the song's main topic, Reznor struggled with depression during the five years following the release of The Downward Spiral in 1994; his health worsened when he began abusing alcohol, cocaine, and other drugs, before completing rehab in 2001. He also had suicidal tendencies due to these issues. In a 2005 interview, Reznor stated that he was "pretty happy".

== Reception ==
Tom Breihan from Pitchfork Media gave a positive review to the song, stating that the song portrays "an absolute mastery" with "its haunted, minimal piano figure and a few hushed synth tones slowly, letting in sputtering static, faraway door-slam drums, and quiet little counter-melodies." When the song was re-released in 2006, Rob Mitchum referred to it as a "'Goodbye Blue Sky' rip-off". In 2020, Kerrang! and Billboard ranked the song number seven and number five, respectively, on their lists of the greatest Nine Inch Nails songs.

== Covers ==
In July 2014, Tori Amos covered the song on her Unrepentant Geraldines Tour. A version of the song was used in the fifth episode of the HBO series Westworld in 2016.
