= Vincent Signorelli discography =

Music of American drummer

- Studio albums: 13
- EPs: 1
- Live albums: 3
- Compilation albums: 3
- Singles: 9

This article details the complete oeuvre of American drummer Vincent Signorelli. He is recognized for his extensive discography performing as a member of many New York-based bands, including Swans, Of Cabbages and Kings, Unsane, Lubricated Goat and A Storm of Light. He has also recorded with Die Warzau and J. G. Thirlwell of Foetus.

== Turbo Hy Dramatics ==
=== Studio albums ===
Title	Album details
High Mass on the High Frontier	Released: 1984 (DE); Label: Diadem; Format: LP
Set Fire to Your Self	Released: 1985 (DE); Label: Rebel Rec.; Formats: LP

=== Extended plays ===
Title	Album details
5 Song Mini-LP	Released: 1984 (DE); Label: F-Musik; Format: LP

== Swans ==
=== Studio albums ===
Title	Album details	Peak chart positions
Title	Album details	BEL (VL)
White Light from the Mouth of Infinity	Released: June 6, 1991 (US); Label: Young God; Formats: CD, CS, LP	195
Love of Life	Released: February 24, 1992 (US); Label: Young God; Formats: CD, CS, LP	—

=== Live albums ===
Title	Album details
Omniscience	Released: 1992 (US); Label: Young God; Format: CD, CS

=== Compilation albums ===
Title	Album details
Various Failures	Released: March 22, 1999 (US); Label: Young God; Format: CD
Forever Burned	Released: 2003 (US); Label: Young God; Format: CD

== Unsane ==
=== Studio albums ===
Title	Album details
Total Destruction	Released: 1993 (US); Label: City Slang; Format: CD, CS, LP
Scattered, Smothered & Covered	Released: 1995 (US); Label: Amphetamine Reptile; Formats: CD, CS, LP
Occupational Hazard	Released: January 27, 1998 (US); Label: Relapse; Formats: CD, LP
Blood Run	Released: April 26, 2005 (US); Label: Relapse; Formats: CD, LP
Visqueen	Released: March 13, 2007 (US); Label: Ipecac; Formats: CD, LP
Wreck	Released: March 20, 2012 (US); Label: Alternative Tentacles; Formats: CD, LP

=== Live albums ===
Title	Album details
Attack in Japan	Released: October 25, 1996 (DE); Label: Young God; Format: CD
Amrep Xmas	Released: 1997 (US); Label: SPV GmbH; Format: CD

=== Compilation albums ===
Title	Album details
Lambhouse: The Collection 1991–1998	Released: October 21, 2003 (US); Label: Relapse; Format: CD

== Of Cabbages and Kings ==
Title	Album details
Hunter's Moon	Released: 1992 (US); Label: Triple X; Format: CD, CS

== Lubricated Goat ==
Title	Album details
Forces You Don't Understand	Released: September 27, 1994 (US); Label: PCP Entertainment; Format: CD

== A Storm of Light ==
Title	Album details
And We Wept the Black Ocean Within	Released: June 10, 2008 (US); Label: Neurot; Format: CD, LP

== Credits ==
Year	Artist	Release	Song(s)
1990	John Moore	Distortion	—
1992	Foetus	Male	—
1993	Idaho	Year After Year	"Here to Go", "Save"
1995	Die Warzau	Engine	—
1995	Foetus	Gash	"Downfall", "Slung"
1997	Foetus	York (First Exit to Brooklyn)	—
2004	Die Warzau	Convenience	—
2008	Jarboe	Mahakali	—
"—" denotes a credit for the entire release.
