= Sterilize (album) =

Studio album by Unsane
- Released: September 29, 2017
- Recorded: January 2017
- Studio: Gatos Trail Recording (Yucca Valley, California)
- Genre: Noise rock, heavy metal
- Length: 37:23
- Label: Southern Lord
- Producer: Unsane

Unsane chronology
Wreck (2012)	Sterilize (2017)

Professional ratings
Aggregate scores
Source	Rating
Metacritic	77/100
Review scores
Source	Rating
AllMusic	3.5/5 stars
Exclaim!	8/10
Metal.de	9/10
Metal Hammer	4/5 stars
Ox-Fanzine	3.5/5 stars
The Quietus	(favorable)
Record Collector	3/5 stars
Rock Hard	9/10

Sterilize is the eighth studio album by American noise rock band Unsane, released September 29, 2017, through Southern Lord. The album was released digitally and physically on compact disc and vinyl formats, including a limited edition red LP pressing consisting of 300 copies.

To promote the album, the band toured during the summer leading up to the record's release as well as the following fall–winter season. Sterilize marks the first studio album by the group to be self-produced, as recording was primarily done by Dave Curran at Gatos Trail Recording Studio in Joshua Tree, CA. The album was mixed at Acre, New York, by Andrew Schnieder in February that same year, and mastering was done by Carl Saff in Chicago, Illinois.

The album was included in the Rolling Stones "20 Best Metal Albums of 2017" list.

== Track listing ==
All tracks are written by Unsane.

No.	Title	Length
1.	"Factory"	4:00
2.	"The Grind"	4:00
3.	"Aberration"	2:37
4.	"No Reprieve"	3:26
5.	"Lung"	3:49
6.	"Inclusion"	3:39
7.	"Distance"	3:49
8.	"A Slow Reaction"	3:09
9.	"We're Fucked"	3:11
10.	"Avail"	5:43
Total length:		37:23

== Personnel ==
- Chris Spencer - guitar, vocals, photography
- Dave Curran - bass, vocals, recording
- Vincent Signorelli – drums
- Andrew Schnieder - mixing
- Carl Saff - mastering
- Alexander Mata - layout
