= James Woolley =

- Woolley in the 1990s.

Background information
- Born: September 26, 1966
- Died: August 14, 2016 (aged 49)
- Occupations: Musician, sound designer
- Instruments: Keyboards, synthesizer
- Years active: 1989–2016
- Formerly of: Die Warzau; Nine Inch Nails (touring member); 2wo (touring member); V.O.I.D.

James Joseph Woolley (September 26, 1966 – August 14, 2016) was an American keyboard and synthesizer player, best known for performing with industrial rock band Nine Inch Nails from 1991 to 1994, participating in the Pretty Hate Machine Tour Series and the Self Destruct Tour. Woolley appeared in the band's music videos for "Wish" and "March of the Pigs", and the video album Closure. Together with Nine Inch Nails, Woolley won a Grammy Award in 1996 for "Best Metal Performance" for their Woodstock '94 performance of "Happiness in Slavery".

== Career ==
In 1989, Woolley joined the Chicago-based band Die Warzau, where he played with future Nine Inch Nails-bandmate Chris Vrenna, and contributed to their 1991 album Big Electric Metal Bass Face. In July of that year, Woolley joined Nine Inch Nails as a live keyboardist for their Lollapalooza Tour and European tour. In 1992, he appeared in the band's music video for "Wish" and later stayed with the band during the recording of The Downward Spiral album, in addition to appearing in the video for "March of the Pigs". In 1994, Woolley participated in the band's Self Destruct tour, before leaving the line-up in December of that year due to family reasons. Earlier that year, Woolley contributed to the Sister Machine Gun album The Torture Technique. Following his departure from Nine Inch Nails, Woolley worked as a sound designer for The Simpsons. In 1997, he appeared in the Nine Inch Nail video album Closure, featuring footage from their Self Destruct tour. In 1998, Woolley toured with Rob Halford's band 2wo, which also included John 5 of Marilyn Manson. After 2wo, Woolley did studio work in Los Angeles, including contributions to albums by Leah Andreone and Ednita Nazario. In 2004, Woolley contributed to Die Warzau's album Convenience. After 2006, he formed the band V.O.I.D. that featured Jon Roberts, Mark Pearlman, and DJ Aaron Chase. Woolley last resided in Round Lake Beach, Illinois.

== Death ==
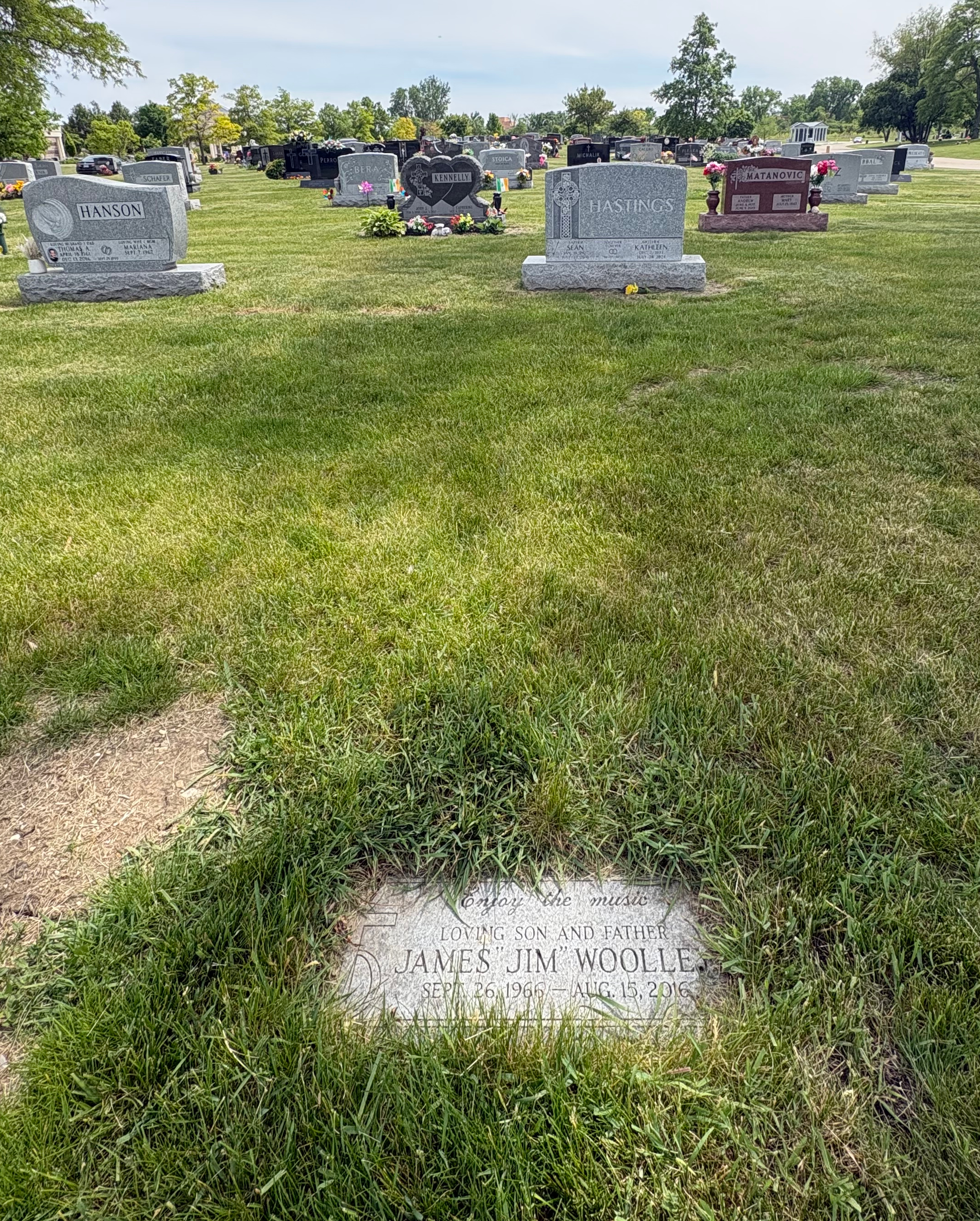
Woolley's grave at All Saints Cemetery

Woolley died on August 14, 2016, at the age of 49. His ex-wife, Kate Van Buren, revealed that Woolley had been living with "significant neck and spine injuries" which later contributed to his death from neck-related injuries after falling off a ladder while retrieving music equipment in his studio near Lake Forest, Illinois. He was buried at All Saints Cemetery in Des Plaines.

Following his death, former Nine Inch Nails-bandmates Trent Reznor and Richard Patrick paid tribute to Woolley. Reznor thanked Woolley for his contributions to Nine Inch Nails during the band's Rock And Roll Hall of Fame induction speech in 2020.

== Discography ==
=== With Die Warzau ===
- Big Electric Metal Bass Face (1991)

=== Production and instrumental credits ===
Year	Artist	Title	Notes
1994	Sister Machine Gun	The Torture Technique	Editing, keyboards
1998	Leah Andreone	Alchemy	Programming, keyboards
1999	Ednita Nazario	Corazón	Keyboards
2004	Die Warzau	Convenience	Performer
