= List of awards and nominations received by Nine Inch Nails =

Nine Inch Nails awards and nominations
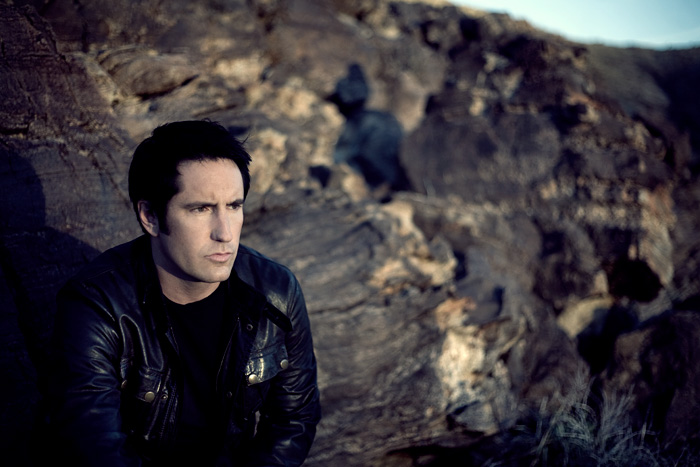
- Trent Reznor in 2008
Awards and nominations
Award	Wins	Nominations
American Music Awards	0	2
Billboard	0	2
Grammy	3	16
Kerrang!	2	0
MTV VMA	0	9
MVPA	1	3

Totals (Note: Certain award groups do not simply award one winner. They acknowledge several different recipients, have runners-up, and have third place. Since this is a specific recognition and is different from losing an award, runner-up mentions are considered wins in this award tally. For simplification and to avoid errors, each award in this list has been presumed to have had a prior nomination.)
- Wins: 6
- Nominations: 31

Nine Inch Nails is an American industrial rock act, founded in 1988 by Trent Reznor in Cleveland, Ohio. As its main producer, singer, songwriter, and instrumentalist, Reznor was the only official member of Nine Inch Nails until the addition of Atticus Ross in 2016. Nine Inch Nails has received six awards from 31 nominations, including three Grammy Awards for the songs "Wish," and "Happiness in Slavery," and "As Alive as You Need Me to Be" in 1993, 1996, and 2026 respectively. Nine Inch Nails have received two Kerrang! Awards honoring the band's overall contributions since 1988. The band has also received nine nominations from the MTV Video Music Awards for several of its videos, including two nominations for the "Closer" video and five nominations for the "Perfect Drug" video, including Video of the Year.

Nine Inch Nails and several of its releases have also received awards and honors from the critical community. The band was ranked as the 94th "Greatest Artist of All Time" by Rolling Stone in 2004. Nine Inch Nails' second studio album, The Downward Spiral, has been included on several "Best Of" lists, including Rolling Stone's "500 Greatest Albums of All Time" and Spin's "100 Greatest Albums, 1985–2005".

== American Music Awards ==
The American Music Awards are awarded annually by a poll of music buyers. Nine Inch Nails has received two nominations.

Year	Nominee / work	Award	Result
1994	Nine Inch Nails	Favorite Alternative Artist	Nominated
1995	Nine Inch Nails	Favorite Alternative Artist	Nominated

== Antville Music Video Awards ==
The Antville Music Video Awards are online awards for the best music video and music video directors of the year. They were first awarded in 2005. Nine Inch Nails has received two nominations.

Year	Nominee / work	Award	Result
2005	"Only"	Worst Video	Nominated
2005	"Only"	Best Video	Nominated

== Billboard Awards ==
Billboard Music Awards

The Billboard Music Awards are sponsored by Billboard magazine and is held annually in December. Nine Inch Nails has received two nominations.

Year	Nominee / work	Award	Result
2005	Nine Inch Nails	Modern Rock Artist of the Year	Nominated
2005	"The Hand That Feeds"	Modern Rock Song of the Year	Nominated

Billboard Music Video Awards

The Billboard Music Video Awards are sponsored by Billboard magazine. Nine Inch Nails has received two nominations.

Year	Nominee / work	Award	Result
1995	"Hurt"	Best Modern Rock Clip of the Year	Nominated
2000	"Starfuckers, Inc."	Best Modern Rock Clip of the Year	Nominated

== D&AD Awards ==
Design and Art Direction (D&AD) is a British educational charity which exists to promote excellence in design and advertising.

Year	Nominee / work	Award	Result
1995	"Closer"	Direction	Wood Pencil
1995	"Closer"	Individual	Graphite Pencil
2006	"Only"	Special Effects	Wood Pencil

== Grammy Awards ==
The Grammy Awards are awarded annually by the National Academy of Recording Arts and Sciences. Nine Inch Nails has received three awards from sixteen nominations.

Year	Nominee / work	Award	Result
1993	"Wish"	Best Metal Performance	Won
1995	The Downward Spiral	Best Alternative Performance	Nominated
1996	"Happiness in Slavery" (Live version as performed at Woodstock '94 music festival.)	Best Metal Performance	Won
1998	"The Perfect Drug"	Best Hard Rock Performance	Nominated
2000	The Fragile	Best Alternative Album	Nominated
2000	"Starfuckers, Inc."	Best Metal Performance	Nominated
2001	"Into the Void"	Best Male Rock Vocal Performance	Nominated
2006	"The Hand That Feeds"	Best Hard Rock Performance	Nominated
2007	"Every Day is Exactly the Same"	Best Hard Rock Performance	Nominated
2009	"34 Ghosts IV"	Best Rock Instrumental Performance	Nominated
2009	Ghosts I–IV	Best Boxed or Special Limited Edition Package	Nominated
2014	Hesitation Marks	Best Alternative Music Album	Nominated
2026	"As Alive as You Need Me to Be"	Best Rock Song	Won
2026	"As Alive as You Need Me to Be"	Best Song Written for Visual Media	Nominated
2027	"Nine Inch Noize"	Best Engineered Album, Non-Classical	Pending
2027	"A Question of Trust - Boys Noize Remix"	Best Remixed Recording	Pending

== MTV Video Music Awards ==
The MTV Video Music Awards were established in 1984 by MTV to celebrate the music videos of the year. Nine Inch Nails has received nine nominations.

Year	Nominee / work	Award	Result
1993	"Wish"	Best Metal/Hard Rock Video	Nominated
1994	"Closer"	Breakthrough Video	Nominated
1994	"Closer"	Best Art Direction in a Video	Nominated
1997	"The Perfect Drug"	Video of the Year	Nominated
1997	"The Perfect Drug"	Best Alternative Video	Nominated
1997	"The Perfect Drug"	Best Direction in a Video	Nominated
1997	"The Perfect Drug"	Best Cinematography in a Video	Nominated
1997	"The Perfect Drug"	Best Art Direction in a Video	Nominated
2000	"Into the Void"	Breakthrough Video	Nominated

== mtvU Woodie Awards ==
MTVU broadcasts its own semi-annual awards show, the Woodie Awards, which it states recognizes "the music voted best by college students."

Year	Nominee / work	Award	Result
2005	"Only"	Best Video Woodie - Live Action	Nominated
2005	"Only"	Best Video Woodie - Animated	Nominated

== MVPA Awards ==
The MVPA Awards are annually presented by a Los Angeles–based music trade organization to honor the year's best music videos.

Year	Nominee / work	Award	Result	Ref.
1994	"Closer"	Video of the Year	Won	
1994	"Closer"	Best Alternative Video	Won	
1994	"Closer"	Best Art Direction	Won	
1994	"Closer"	Best Cinematography	Won	
1994	"Closer"	Best Styling	Won	
2001	"Starfuckers, Inc."	Best Alternative Video	Nominated	
2001	"Starfuckers, Inc."	Best Editing	Nominated	
2006	"Only"	Best Animated Video	Won	
2006	"Only"	Best Director of a Male Artist	Nominated	
2006	"Only"	Best Rock Video	Nominated	
2006	"Only"	Best Special Effects	Nominated	

== Kerrang! Awards ==
The Kerrang! Awards is an annual awards ceremony held by Kerrang!, a British rock magazine. Nine Inch Nails has won two awards.

Year	Nominee / work	Award	Result
2005	Nine Inch Nails	Classic Songwriter Award	Won
2007	Nine Inch Nails	Kerrang! Icon Award	Won

== Polstar Concert Industry Awards ==
The Pollstar Concert Industry Awards is an annual award ceremony to honor artists and professionals in the concert industry.

Year	Nominee / work	Award	Result
1992	Pretty Hate Machine Tour Series	Club Tour of the Year	Nominated
1995	Self-Destruct Tour	Small Hall Tour of the Year	Nominated
1996	Dissonance/Outside Tour (w/David Bowie)	Most Creative Stage Production	Nominated
2010	Wave Goodbye Tour (w/Jane's Addiction)	Most Creative Stage Production	Nominated

== Rock and Roll Hall of Fame ==
The Rock and Roll Hall of Fame honors artists, producers, engineers, and other notable figures who have influenced the development of rock music. Nine Inch Nails became eligible for induction in 2015. After two consecutive nominations, the band was then absent from the list of nominees for three years running. Asked about this apparent snub, Reznor responded, "I honestly couldn’t give less of a shit." The band was inducted on their third ballot in 2020.

Year	Nominee / work	Award	Result
2015	Nine Inch Nails	Performers	Nominated
2016	Nine Inch Nails	Performers	Nominated
2020	Nine Inch Nails	Performers	Won

== Žebřík Music Awards ==
Year	Nominee / work	Award	Result	Ref.
2007	Beside You in Time	Best International Music DVD	Nominated	

== Miscellaneous awards and honors ==
Year	Nominated work	Award/honor	Nominator
1999	"Closer" (music video)	100 Greatest Videos Ever Made (#17)	MTV
2000	Nine Inch Nails	100 Greatest Artists of Hard Rock (#43)	VH1
2000	Fragility Tour	Best tour of the year	Rolling Stone
2003	"Closer"	100 Best Songs of the Past 25 Years (#93)	VH1
2003	The Downward Spiral	500 Greatest Albums of All Time (#200)	Rolling Stone
2004	Nine Inch Nails	The Immortals – 100 Greatest Artists of All Time (#94)	Rolling Stone
2004	The Downward Spiral	The Top 500 Heavy Metal Albums of All Time (#488)	Martin Popoff
2004	The Fragile	The Top 500 Heavy Metal Albums of All Time (#390)	Martin Popoff
2005	The Downward Spiral	100 Greatest Albums, 1985–2005 (#25)	Spin
2005	With Teeth	40 Best Albums of 2005 (#29)	Spin
2007	Year Zero	Top 50 Albums of 2007 (#21)	Rolling Stone
2008	The Downward Spiral	100 Best Albums from 1983 to 2008 (#81)	Entertainment Weekly
2008	Ghosts I–IV	Best of 2008 (#4)	Last.fm
2008	The Slip	Top 50 Albums of 2008 (#37)	Rolling Stone
2009	Trent Reznor	The RS 100: Agents of Change (#46)	Rolling Stone
2009	Trent Reznor	Webby Artist of the Year Award	Webby Awards
2009	"Closer"	Hottest 100 of All Time (#62)	Triple J
2009	"The Hand That Feeds"	The Top 500 Tracks of the 2000s (#406)	Pitchfork Media
2010	The Downward Spiral	125 Best Albums of the Past 25 Years (#10)	Spin
2010	Pretty Hate Machine	Best New Reissue	Pitchfork Media
2026	Tron: Ares	Best Film Music	Saturn Awards

== See also ==
- List of awards and nominations received by Trent Reznor and Atticus Ross
