= Unsane (disambiguation) =

Unsane is a 2018 film directed by Steven Soderbergh.

It may also refer to:

- Unsane (band), an American noise rock band
  - Unsane (album), 1991 debut album by the band of the same name
- Unsane, US release title of 1982 Italian film Tenebrae

== See also ==
- Insane
