= Funkopolis =

Single by Die Warzau

from the album Big Electric Metal Bass Face
- Released: 1991
- Studio: Various: Chicago Trax; (Chicago, IL); D&D Studios; (New York City, NY); Streeterville; (Chicago, IL)
- Genre: EBM; industrial rock
- Length: 3:59
- Label: Atlantic/Fiction
- Songwriter(s): Van Christie; Jim Marcus
- Producer(s): Van Christie; Jim Marcus

Die Warzau singles chronology
"Strike to the Body" (1990)	"Funkopolis" (1991)	"Never Again" (1992)

"Funkopolis" is a song by the American industrial rock group Die Warzau. It is the first single released in support of their second album Big Electric Metal Bass Face.

== Formats and track listing ==
All songs written by Van Christie and Jim Marcus

US U-matic (YESX 2)

1. "Funkopolis" (Remix) – 5:24

US CD single (865 655-2)

1. "Funkopolis" – 3:57
2. "Funkopolis" (Funkaphobia) – 5:08
3. "Funkopolis" (Le Funk) – 4:04
4. "Funkopolis" (To Le Funk) – 7:35
5. "Funkopolis" (Funk To Be Had) – 5:38
6. "Funkopolis" (Le Blanc Funk) – 5:12
7. "Funkopolis" (Funked Up) – 4:01

US 12" single (0-85978)

1. "Funkopolis" (Funk To Be Had Mix) – 5:39
2. "Funkopolis" (Funkaphobia Mix) – 5:09
3. "Funkopolis" (LP Version) – 4:00
4. "Funkopolis" (Le Blanc Funk Mix) – 5:12
5. "Funkopolis" (To Le Funk Mix) – 7:36
6. "Aye Corrido" – 4:17

US 12" single (FICSX 40 P1)

1. "Funkopolis" – 3:57
2. "Funkopolis" (Funkaphobia) – 5:08
3. "Funkopolis" (Le Funk) – 4:04
4. "Funkopolis" (To Le Funk) – 7:35

UK 12" single (FICSX 40 P1)

1. "Funkopolis – 3:57
2. "Funkopolis" (Funkaphobia) – 5:08
3. "Funkopolis" (Le Funk) – 4:04
4. "Funkopolis" (To Le Funk) – 7:35
5. "Funkopolis" (Funk To Be Had) – 5:38
6. "Funkopolis" (Le Blanc Funk) – 5:12
7. "Funkopolis" (Funked Up) – 4:01
8. "Shock Box" – 3:29

== Charts ==
Chart (1991)	Peak position
US Dance Club Songs (Billboard)	8

== Personnel ==
Adapted from the Funkopolis liner notes.

Die Warzau

- Van Christie – guitar, keyboards, sampler, programming, production, engineering (1, 3–5, 8)
- Jim Marcus – lead vocals, drums, percussion, electronics, horns, production

Additional performers

- Keith LeBlanc – remixing (2, 6, 7)

Production and design

- Mike Rogers – engineering (1, 3–5, 8)

== Release history ==
Region	Date	Label	Format	Catalog
United States	1991	Atlantic	U-matic	
United States	1991	Atlantic	LP	DMD 1699
United States	1991	Atlantic	CD, LP	0-85978
United Kingdom	1991	Fiction	CD, LP	FIC 40
