= Strike to the Body =

Single by Die Warzau

from the album Disco Rigido
- Released: 1990
- Studio: Various: Chicago Trax; (Chicago, IL); River North; (Chicago, IL)
- Genre: EBM; industrial rock
- Length: 3:49
- Label: Fiction/PolyGram
- Songwriter(s): Van Christie; Jim Marcus
- Producer(s): Van Christie; Jim Marcus; Steve Spapperi

Die Warzau singles chronology
"Welcome to America" (1989)	"Strike to the Body" (1990)	"Funkopolis" (1991)

"Strike to the Body" is a song by the American industrial rock group Die Warzau. It is the fifth single released in support of their debut album Disco Rigido.

== Formats and track listing ==
All songs written by Van Christie and Jim Marcus

US 12" single (YESX 2)

1. "Strike To The Body" (Funky Body Mix) – 4:34
2. "Strike To The Body" (Home Body Mix) – 5:00
3. "Strike To The Body" (Rubber Body Mix) – 4:49
4. "Strike To The Body" (Ampalang Mix) – 5:28

US 12" single (873 849)

1. "Strike To The Body" (Lil Louis' Body Blow Mix) – 7:08
2. "Strike To The Body" (Ampalang Mix) – 5:40
3. "Strike To The Body" (LP Mix) – 3:47
4. "Strike To The Body" (Modification Mix) – 6:20
5. "Strike To The Body" (Lil Louis' Body Blow Vocal Mix) – 3:50
6. "Jackhammer" (Remix) – 6:13

== Charts ==
Chart (1989)	Peak position
US Dance Club Songs (Billboard)	33

== Personnel ==
Adapted from the Strike to the Body liner notes.

Die Warzau

- Van Christie – guitar, synthesizer, sampler, computer, production, editing
- Jim Marcus – lead vocals, saxophone, percussion, noises, production

Additional performers

- Lil Louis – remixing and additional production (A1, B2)

Production and design

- Steve Spapperi – production

== Release history ==
Region	Date	Label	Format	Catalog
United States	1990	Fiction	LP	873 849
United Kingdom	1990	Fiction	LP	FICSX 31
United Kingdom	1990	Non Fiction	LP	YESX 2
