= Wreck (album) =

Studio album by Unsane
- Released: March 20, 2012
- Studios: Translator Audio, Brooklyn, New York
- Genre: Noise rock
- Length: 41:04
- Label: Alternative Tentacles
- Producers: Andrew Schneider, Unsane

Unsane chronology
Visqueen (2007)	Wreck (2012)	Sterilize (2017)

Professional ratings
Aggregate scores
Source	Rating
Metacritic	75/100
Review scores
Source	Rating
AllMusic	3.5/5 stars
Alternative Press	4/5 stars
Exclaim!	Favorable
Pitchfork	7.6/10
PopMatters	3/5 stars

Wreck is the seventh album by Unsane, released on March 20, 2012, through Alternative Tentacles.

== Track listing ==
All tracks are written by Unsane, except "Ha Ha Ha" by Flipper.

No.	Title	Length
1.	"Rat"	4:09
2.	"Decay"	4:34
3.	"No Chance"	4:27
4.	"Pigeon"	4:07
5.	"Metropolis"	2:39
6.	"Ghost"	3:45
7.	"Don't"	4:16
8.	"Stuck"	6:17
9.	"Roach"	3:54
10.	"Ha Ha Ha"	2:56

== Personnel ==
Unsane

- Dave Curran – bass guitar, additional vocals, design
- Vincent Signorelli – drums
- Chris Spencer – vocals, guitar, photography

Production and additional personnel

- Carl Saff – mastering
- Andrew Schneider – production, mixing, recording
- Unsane – production
- Jammi York – photography
