= Visqueen (disambiguation) =

Visqueen may refer to:

- Visqueen, a brand of plastic sheeting
- Visqueen (album), by American noise rock band Unsane
- Visqueen (band), an American power pop band
