= Welcome to America (song) =

Single by Die Warzau

from the album Disco Rigido
- Released: 1989
- Studio: Various: Chicago Trax; (Chicago, IL); River North; (Chicago, IL)
- Genre: EBM; industrial rock
- Length: 4:56
- Label: Fiction/PolyGram
- Songwriter(s): Van Christie; Jim Marcus
- Producer(s): Van Christie; Jim Marcus; Steve Spapperi

Die Warzau singles chronology
"Welcome to America" (1989)	"Strike to the Body" (1990)

"Welcome to America" is a song by the American industrial rock group Die Warzau. It is the second single released in support of their debut album Disco Rigido.

== Formats and track listing ==
All songs written by Van Christie and Jim Marcus

US 12" single (889 899-1)

1. "Welcome to America" – 4:18
2. "Welcome to America" (Remix) – 5:50
3. "Welcome to America" (Hip Hop Mix) – 5:16
4. "Welcome to America" (Hip Hop Dub) – 2:42

== Charts ==
Chart (1989)	Peak position
US Dance Club Songs (Billboard)	31

== Personnel ==
Adapted from the Welcome to America liner notes.

Die Warzau

- Van Christie – guitar, synthesizer, sampler, computer, production, editing
- Jim Marcus – lead vocals, saxophone, percussion, noises, production

Additional performers

- Jennifer Wilcox – additional vocals

Production and design

- Tom Coyne – mastering
- Steve Spapperi – production

== Release history ==
Region	Date	Label	Format	Catalog
United States	1989	PolyGram	LP	889 899
Europe	1989	Fiction	LP	FICSX 31
