= Blue (Oxygiene 23 album) =

Studio album by Oxygiene 23
- Released: April 11, 1995
- Studio: Warzone (Chicago, Illinois)
- Genre: Trance; new-age
- Length: 54:16
- Label: Fifth Colvmn

Blue is the debut studio album by Oxygiene 23, released on April 11, 1995, by Fifth Colvmn Records.

== Music ==
Prior to releasing Blue, the band had recorded the song "Sacrifice" and released it to Invisible Records for their compilation Can You See It Yet?. The album's theme is inspired by mythology and its music informed by new-age and trance music, with wind instrument performances recorded by Christopher Hall of Stabbing Westward and Mars Williams of The Waitresses. After the album was released the song "Good for You" was included on the various artist compilation Forced Cranial Removal by Fifth Colvmn Records.

== Reception ==
Professional ratings
Review scores
Source	Rating
AllMusic	3/5 stars
Industrialnation	Positive

John Bush of AllMusic said "Die Warzau members Jim Marcus and Van Christie sidestepped industrial for this side project including jazz, Eastern musics and a wide range of percussion." Sonic Boom described the music as "soft, happy, percussive and very lulling" and that the "wind instruments percolate, extravagant electronic and live percussion filter through the fresh spring breeze, and female vocals dance through meadows." Industrialnation called the album "pleasantly different," citing "outstanding production" and vocals "on par with respected modern jazz singer Sade."

== Track listing ==
All tracks are written by Van Christie, Jane Jensen and Jim Marcus

No.	Title	Length
1.	"Adonis"	5:34
2.	"Krsna"	5:25
3.	"Angel"	3:27
4.	"Sacrifice"	5:06
5.	"Flying"	5:29
6.	"Anywhere"	3:21
7.	"Smooth"	3:01
8.	"Dance All Night"	4:55
9.	"Lode"	4:33
10.	"Good for You"	3:51
11.	"Millenium"	5:52
12.	"Opium"	3:42

== Personnel ==
Adapted from the Oxygiene 23 liner notes.

Oxygiene 23

- Van Christie – programming, guitar, engineering (1–6, 11, 12)
- Jane Jensen – vocals, programming
- Jim Marcus – drums, percussion, flute, saxophone, piano

Additional performers

- Dale Andrew – additional percussion
- Seu Bang – guitar
- Christopher Hall – trumpet
- Jason More – additional percussion
- Mars Williams – tenor saxophone

Production and design

- Keith Banks – mastering
- Zalman Fishman – executive-production
- Chris Morford – engineering (8, 10)
- Scott Ramsayer – engineering (7, 9)

== Release history ==
Region	Date	Label	Format	Catalog
United States	1995	Fifth Colvmn	CD	9868-63185
