= Never Again (Die Warzau song) =

Single by Die Warzau

from the album Big Electric Metal Bass Face
- Released: 1992
- Studio: Various: Chicago Trax; (Chicago, IL); D&D Studios; (New York City, NY); Streeterville; (Chicago, IL)
- Genre: EBM; industrial rock
- Length: 4:30
- Label: Atlantic/Fiction
- Songwriter(s): Van Christie; Jim Marcus
- Producer(s): Van Christie; Jim Marcus

Die Warzau singles chronology
"Funkopolis" (1991)	"Never Again" (1992)

"Never Again" is a song by the American industrial rock group Die Warzau. It is the second single released in support of their second album Big Electric Metal Bass Face.

== Formats and track listing ==
All songs written by Van Christie and Jim Marcus

UK CD single (85898)

1. "Never Again" (Atlantic Mix) – 4:56
2. "Never Again" (Pacific Mix) – 5:16
3. "Never Again" (Dead Sea Mix) – 4:31
4. "Never Again" (Baltic Mix) – 5:02
5. "Never Again" (Caspian Mix) – 5:46
6. "Never Again" (Bosphorous Mix) – 3:46
7. "Cold" (Live) – 4:59
8. "Land of the Free" (Live) – 4:45

UK 12" single (DMD 1795)

1. "Never Again" (Atlantic Mix) – 4:56
2. "Never Again" (Pacific Mix) – 5:16
3. "Never Again" (Dead Sea Mix) – 4:31
4. "Never Again" (Baltic Mix) – 5:02
5. "Never Again" (Caspian Mix) – 5:46
6. "Never Again" (Bosphorus Mix) – 3:46

== Charts ==
Chart (1991)	Peak position
US Dance Club Songs (Billboard)	23

== Personnel ==
Adapted from the Never Again liner notes.

Die Warzau

- Van Christie – guitar, keyboards, sampler, programming, noises, production, engineering, remixing
- Jim Marcus – lead vocals, drums, percussion, electronics, horns, noises, production, remixing

Additional performers

- Christopher Hall – noises
- Mike Rogers – noises
- Chris Vrenna – noises

Production and design

- Tom Coyne – mastering
- Mike Rogers – engineering

== Release history ==
Region	Date	Label	Format	Catalog
United States	1992	Atlantic	LP	DMD 1795
United States	1992	Atlantic	LP	85898
United States	1992	Fiction	CD	85898
