= Jane Jensen (musician) =

American actress, producer and musician (born 1967)

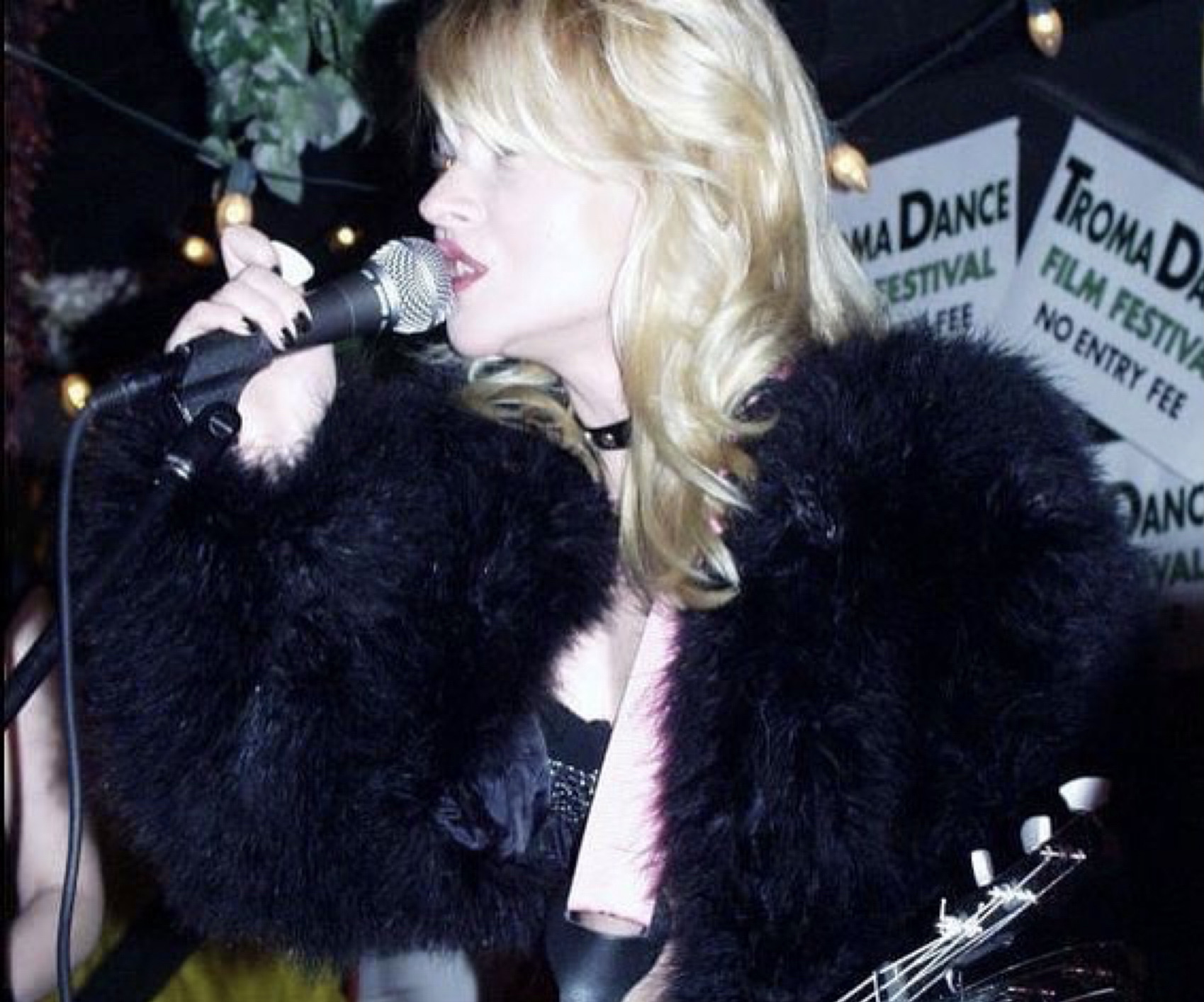
- Jane Jensen

Background information
- Born: Jane Anne Jensen; December 9, 1967 (age 58)
- Genres: Alternative, electronic, industrial, dream pop, New Age, trance
- Occupations: Singer, songwriter, producer, poet, actress
- Instruments: Vocals, keyboards, guitar
- Years active: 1985–present
- Labels: Fifth Colvmn, Flip Records, Interscope
- Website: https://www.janejensenmusic.com/

Jane Jensen (born December 9, 1967) is an American actress, producer and musician.

== Early life and education ==
Jensen studied art, dance, music and theatre at Columbia College Chicago. She was a dormitory neighbor to comic book artist Alex Ross and was a photographic model for some of his characters.

== Career ==
She began performing in avant-garde productions at the Organic Theatre Company, Pavo Arts Center and various performance art venues and nightclubs.

She co-produced three episodes of Artists Uncensored Television with Eden H. Roemer that featured her own work as well as other Chicago area artists including Jim Marcus, Jon Schnepp, and Erika W. Brown.

In 1992, Jensen moved to New York to join the Isadora Duncan Dance Group at the American Academy of the Arts in Tribeca. In 1997, Jensen starred as Juliet in Troma Entertainment’s Tromeo & Juliet, written and directed by James Gunn and Lloyd Kaufman.

From 1991–95, Jensen recorded under the names Eve, LadyVox, X-Venus and then as Oxygiene 23 with Die Warzau producing.

In 1997, Jensen released an electronic rock CD, Comic Book Whore, that featured her caricature art and was released by Flip/Interscope Records. She toured the US and Australia as a musician and caricature artist. Band members included music producer Craig Kafton and Siouxsie and the Banshees guitarist John Valentine Carruthers.

In 2000, Jensen toured and recorded with the all-girl spunk band The Dolls with Sandy Brockwell, Cat Oberg, Emily Barracano, Dawn McGrath, Kate Skater and Vanessa Johnson. The Dolls performed regularly for Troma Entertainment and independent film festivals.

Jensen had a recurring role in USA Network's Big Apple in 2001.

In 2003, Jensen released another solo album, Burner, on her own label Autozen Music. Produced by Craig Kafton and Martin Bisi, this release won best alternative album from Just Plain Folks, the largest independent music awards, in 2004. Burner was followed in 2007 by My Rockabye, which was recognized by Unisong for excellence in songwriting.

In 2008, comic book artist Gene Ha represented Jensen's Comic Book Whore in an issue of DC Comic's Top 10.

== Discography ==
=== Albums ===
Solo

- Comic Book Whore (Interscope, Ichibon, Flip October 1, 1996)
- Burner (Autozen 2000)
- My Rockabye (Autozen, Indie 500 Records 2007)
- The Privateer, Part 1 (EP Autozen 2008)

With Oxygiene 23

- Blue (Fifth Colvmn, 1995)

=== EPs ===
- "Dollzrock" (2015)
- "Trust" (2017)
- ”Enchant” (2021)
- ”Changeling” (2022)

=== Singles ===
- "Get Up And Shout" (Triple R Records 2009)
- "Work Free" (Autozen 2010)

=== Other appearances ===
- Original Soundtrack - Tromeo & Juliet: "Monster Island" (Oglio Records 1997)
- Original Score - The Crow: Salvation [Score] (Love Theme, Koch Records 2000)
- Original Soundtrack - Citizen Toxie: The Toxic Avenger IV: "Rock That", "Burner"
- Original Soundtrack - SLiTHER: "Fast Girl USA" & "Saturday Night" (Bulletproof Records 2007)
- New York Underground (Dragonya Records Germany 1995)
