= Unlabeled =

Unlabeled may refer to:

- Unlabeled coloring, in graph theory
  - Graph enumeration § Labeled vs unlabeled problems
  - Tree (graph theory) § Unlabeled trees
- Unlabeled sexuality, when an individual does not label their sexual identity
- Unlabeled - The Demos, EP by Leah Andreone

== See also ==
- Label
- Labelling, action
- Labeled data, in computer science
