= Occupational Hazard =

Studio album by Unsane
- Released: January 27, 1998
- Studio: Excello, Brooklyn, NY
- Genre: Noise rock
- Length: 39:17
- Label: Relapse
- Producer: Billy Anderson, Bruce Hathaway

Unsane chronology
Amrep Xmas (1997)	Occupational Hazard (1998)	Lambhouse: The Collection 1991–1998 (2003)

Singles from Occupational Hazard
- 1. "Sick" Released: February 20, 1996

Occupational Hazard is Unsane's fourth studio album. It was released in 1998 through Relapse Records.

== Critical reception ==
Professional ratings
Review scores
Source	Rating
AllMusic	3/5 stars
Chronicles of Chaos	7/10
Collector's Guide to Heavy Metal	6/10
The Encyclopedia of Popular Music	3/5 stars
Rock Hard	6.5/10

Bake Butler of AllMusic described the album as "getting hit by a semi, kicked in the teeth, and thrown down three flights of stairs all at once. [...] In a way unlike almost any other, they scream in your face fairly emotional, damaging lyrics, while breaking the musical boundaries, as well as your eardrums." CMJ New Music Monthly called it "still all meat-grinder riffs slathered on top of a pummeling, breakneck-tempo rhythm section."

== Track listing ==
All lyrics written by Chris Spencer, except "Scam", written by Dave Curran. All songs written by Unsane.

No.	Title	Length
1.	"Committed"	2:42
2.	"This Plan"	3:18
3.	"Over Me"	2:56
4.	"Take in the Stray"	3:07
5.	"Stop"	3:36
6.	"Wait to Lose"	3:03
7.	"Sick"	2:35
8.	"Hazmat"	3:08
9.	"Smells Like Rain"	2:38
10.	"Lead"	3:17
11.	"Humidifier"	2:43
12.	"Scam"	2:43
13.	"Understand"	3:21

== Credits ==
- Vincent Signorelli – drums
- Chris Spencer – guitar, vocals
- Dave Curran – bass, vocals
