= Scattered, Smothered & Covered =

Studio album by Unsane
- Released: 1995
- Recorded: January–May, 1995
- Studios: AmRep, Minneapolis, MN
- Genres: Noise rock; post-hardcore; alternative metal
- Length: 35:09
- Label: Amphetamine Reptile
- Producer: Tim Mac

Unsane chronology
| Total Destruction (1993) | Scattered, Smothered & Covered (1995) | Amrep Xmas (1997) |

Scattered, Smothered & Covered is Unsane's third studio album, released in 1995 through Amphetamine Reptile. The album is the first to feature bassist Dave Curran, who replaced founding member Pete Shore after he left the band in 1994. Two of the album's tracks, "Scrape" and "Alleged", had music videos produced for them. The music video for "Scrape", a compilation of skate board accident videos, was made for $169 and was played heavily on MTV. The album was named in honor of Waffle House, a southern restaurant chain. One of Waffle House's advertising campaigns used the phrase "scattered, smothered and covered," a reference to hash browns ordered prepared with onions and cheese.

== Reception ==
Professional ratings
Review scores
| Source | Rating |
|---|---|
| AllMusic | 4/5 stars |

Patrick Kennedy from AllMusic said that the album "stripped down and sharpened the band's signature minor-key noise attack", adding that "engineer Tim Mac's facility in gaining instrument separation [...] provided the adrenaline injection Unsane had needed in the studio for years." In 2012, Decibel included the album in its "Hall of Fame" list.

== Track listing ==
| No. | Title | Length |
|---|---|---|
| 1. | "Scrape" | 3:09 |
| 2. | "Alleged" | 3:01 |
| 3. | "Blame Me" | 2:22 |
| 4. | "Out" | 3:10 |
| 5. | "Can't See" | 2:21 |
| 6. | "Get Off My Back" | 4:10 |
| 7. | "Blew" | 3:28 |
| 8. | "Empty Cartridge" | 2:13 |
| 9. | "No Loss" | 2:45 |
| 10. | "Test My Faith" | 2:35 |
| 11. | "Ruin" | 2:15 |
| 12. | "Swim" | 3:41 |
| Total length: | | 35:09 |

== Credits ==
- Dave Curran – bass guitar, backing vocals
- Vincent Signorelli – drums
- Chris Spencer – lead vocals, guitar
- Harvey Bennett Stafford – photography

== Release history ==
| Region | Date | Label | Format | Catalog |
|---|---|---|---|---|
| United States | 1995 | Amphetamine Reptile | CD, LP, CS | AMREP 039 |
| Switzerland | 2006 | Ronald Reagan Records | 2xCD | RR675-2 |
| Switzerland | 2006 | Division Records | 2xCD | DR027 |
| United States | 2016 | Amphetamine Reptile | CD, LP | MVD8225 |
| United States | 2016 | MVD Audio | CD, LP | MVD8225 |
