= Total Destruction =

Studio album by Unsane
- Released: January 18, 1994
- Recorded: January 1993
- Studio: BC (Brooklyn)
- Genre: Noise rock; post-hardcore; alternative metal
- Length: 35:58
- Label: Matador; Atlantic
- Producer: Martin Bisi; Unsane

Unsane chronology
Singles 89–92 (1992)	Total Destruction (1994)	Scattered, Smothered & Covered (1995)

Singles from Self Destruct
- 1. "Body Bomb" Released: January 24, 1994

Total Destruction is the second studio album by American noise rock band Unsane, released on January 18, 1994, through Matador and Atlantic Records. At the time, Matador and Atlantic had a deal where at the least six albums issued by Matador must be released through Atlantic's promotion system. The album was recorded for $25,000—a comparatively small budget for a major label album—in order to reduce the amount of money Unsane would owe to Atlantic.

To promote the album, a music video was produced for the track "Body Bomb", in which a disturbed man builds a bomb and blows up a building filled with people. The video was banned from airing on MTV. In 1998, Vox ranked the album's cover artwork at number 41 on its list of the "50 worst album sleeves of all time".

== Critical reception ==
Professional ratings
Review scores
Source	Rating
AllMusic	2.5/5 stars
The Encyclopedia of Popular Music	4/5 stars
Kerrang!	3/5 stars
NME	7/10
Rock Hard	7.5/10
Select	2/5 stars
Vox	3/10

Total Destruction received mixed reviews from critics. John Bush from AllMusic called it "less compelling than the singles collection" and "too repetitive", adding that "the band has slowed down the rhythms a bit."

== Track listing ==
No.	Title	Length
1.	"Body Bomb"	3:41
2.	"Straight"	4:02
3.	"Black Book"	2:40
4.	"Trench"	4:02
5.	"Dispatched"	2:18
6.	"Throw It Away"	3:59
7.	"Broke"	1:55
8.	"Road Trip"	3:48
9.	"Wayne"	2:47
10.	"Get Away"	3:04
11.	"S.O.S."	3:11
12.	"455"	2:31
Total length:		35:58

== Personnel ==
Personnel per liner notes.

Unsane

- Pete Shore – bass guitar, backing vocals
- Vincent Signorelli – drums
- Chris Spencer – lead vocals, guitar

Additional musicians and production

- Martin Bisi – production, engineering
- Simon Bodger – photography
- Jens Jürgensen – cover photography
- Chris Toliver – photography
- Unsane – production
