= Singles 89–92 =

Compilation album by Unsane
- Released: 1992
- Recorded: 1989–1992
- Genre: Post-hardcore, noise rock
- Length: 40:28
- Label: Matador

Unsane chronology
Unsane (1991)	Singles 89–92 (1992)	Total Destruction (1994)

Singles 89–92 is Unsane's first compilation album, released in 1992 through Matador Records. Like the title suggests, the album is composed of singles the band released between 1989 and 1992.

== Reception ==
Professional ratings
Review scores
Source	Rating
AllMusic	4.5/5 stars

Writing in AllMusic several years after its release, John Bush said that these singles "show an intriguing facet of drone-metal not seen before."

== Track listing ==
All tracks are written by Unsane.

No.	Title	Length
1.	"Burn"	4:02
2.	"This Town"	2:40
3.	"Urge to Kill"	3:51
4.	"Vandal-X"	1:45
5.	"Streetsweeper"	2:58
6.	"Concrete Bed"	2:44
7.	"My Right"	3:58
8.	"Jungle Music"	2:23
9.	"Blood Boy"	2:19
10.	"4-Stix"	2:21
11.	"Boost"	2:37
12.	"El Mundo"	3:15
13.	"Blood Boy"	5:31
Total length:		40:28

== Personnel ==
Unsane

- Charlie Ondras – drums
- Pete Shore – bass guitar
- Chris Spencer – vocals, guitar

Additional musicians and production

- Jens Jürgensen – photography
