= List of Nine Inch Nails concert tours =

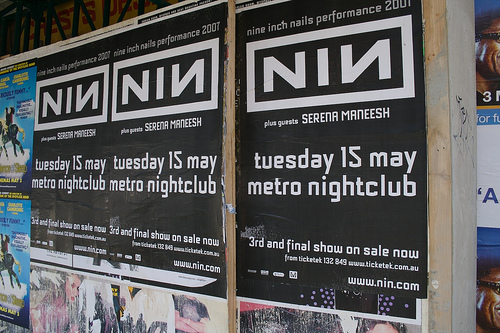
Tour posters from the Performance 2007 tour.

Nine Inch Nails is an American industrial rock act, founded in 1988 by Trent Reznor in Cleveland, Ohio. Since 1988, they have performed throughout the world, including tours in North America, South America, Europe, Oceania, and Asia. During its earliest incarnations, Nine Inch Nails as a live band acted as supporting acts on tours for bands and musicians such as Skinny Puppy, The Jesus and Mary Chain, Peter Murphy, and Guns N' Roses. Subsequent tours have featured Nine Inch Nails as the headlining act, with support from bands such as Unkle, Marilyn Manson, Atari Teenage Riot, and A Perfect Circle.

The group's live performances contrast with its in-studio counterpart. Reznor writes and performs nearly all Nine Inch Nails studio material, with occasional instrumental and vocal contributions from other artists. However, Reznor has typically assembled groups of backing musicians to interpret songs for tours and other live performances. The live-band lineup has changed constantly throughout the band's history, with frontman Reznor remaining the only constant on vocals and guitar, and long-time studio collaborator Atticus Ross officially joining in 2016. Notable musicians who have contributed to live performances include Chris Vrenna, Richard Patrick, Jeff Ward, James Woolley, Danny Lohner, Robin Finck, Charlie Clouser, Jerome Dillon, Alessandro Cortini, Josh Freese, and Ilan Rubin.

== Pretty Hate Machine Tour Series (1988–1991) ==
Duration	Tour leg	Band lineup			Location(s) (dates)	Other acts	Ref.
Duration	Tour leg	Guitar	Drums	Keyboard	Location(s) (dates)	Other acts	Ref.
Oct–Nov; 1988	Skinny Puppy's; VIVIsectVI Tour	—	Ron; Musarra	Chris; Vrenna	North America (8 dates)	Headliner: Skinny Puppy	
Oct–Dec; 1989	Pretty Hate Machine promotional tour	Richard; Patrick	Chris; Vrenna	Nick; Rushe (Note: Prior to Rushe's joining, Gary Talpas, the band's art director, filled the keyboardist role for a few shows, mostly acting as an extra body on stage.)	North America (9 dates)		
Jan–Mar; 1990	Jesus and Mary Chain's; Automatic tour	Richard; Patrick	Chris; Vrenna	David; Haymes	North America (30 dates)	Headliner: Jesus and Mary Chain	
Mar–Apr; 1990	Peter Murphy's; Deep tour	Richard; Patrick	Chris; Vrenna	David; Haymes	North America (26 dates)	Headliner: Peter Murphy	
May–Aug; 1990	Hate tour	Richard; Patrick	Chris; Vrenna	Lee Mars	North America (39 dates)	Support: Meat Beat Manifesto, Die Warzau, Pure, Cold Front	
Dec 1990– Feb 1991	Sin tour	Richard; Patrick	Jeff Ward	Lee Mars	North America (32 dates)	Support: Die Warzau, Chemlab	
Jul–Aug; 1991	Lollapalooza	Richard; Patrick	Jeff Ward	James; Woolley	North America (25 dates)	With: Jane's Addiction, Siouxsie and the Banshees, Living Colour, Ice-T & Body Count, Butthole Surfers, Rollins Band, Violent Femmes	
Aug–Sep; 1991	European tour	Richard; Patrick	Jeff Ward	James; Woolley	Europe (13 dates)	Headliner: Guns N' Roses, The Wonderstuff, Carter the Unstoppable Sex Machine	

== Self-Destruct (1994–1996) ==
Duration	Tour leg	Band lineup				Location(s) (dates)	Other acts	Ref.
Duration	Tour leg	Guitar	Bass	Drums	Keyboard	Location(s) (dates)	Other acts	Ref.
Mar–Aug; 1994	Self-Destruct	Robin Finck	Danny Lohner	Chris Vrenna	James Woolley (Note: In the midst of the Further Down the Spiral tour, Charlie Clouser replaced Woolley on keyboards, in late December 1994.)	North America, Europe (53 dates)	Support: Marilyn Manson, Type O Negative, Fem2fem, PIG, Die Krupps, Treponem Pal	
Aug 1994– Feb 1995	Further Down the Spiral tour	Robin Finck	Danny Lohner	Chris Vrenna	James Woolley	North America (82 dates)	Support: Marilyn Manson, Jim Rose Circus, Pop Will Eat Itself, Hole	
Apr 1995	Alternative Nation Festival	Robin Finck	Danny Lohner	Chris Vrenna	Charlie Clouser	Australia (3 dates)	With: Faith No More, Ice-T & Body Count, Lou Reed, Violent Femmes, Primus, Tool, L7, The Tea Party, Ween, Live, The Flaming Lips, Pennywise, Pop Will Eat Itself, Powderfinger	
Sep–Oct; 1995	Dissonance/Outside tour	Robin Finck	Danny Lohner	Chris Vrenna	Charlie Clouser	North America (26 dates)	With: David Bowie Support: Prick	
Nov–Dec; 1995	Club Tour	Robin Finck	Danny Lohner	Chris Vrenna	Charlie Clouser	North America (7 dates)	Support: Helmet	
Aug–Sep; 1996	Nights of Nothing tour	Kevin McMahon	Danny Lohner	Chris Vrenna	Charlie Clouser	North America (3 dates)	With: Marilyn Manson, Meat Beat Manifesto	

== Fragility (1999–2000) ==
Duration	Tour leg	Band lineup				Location(s) (dates)	Other acts	Ref.
Duration	Tour leg	Guitar	Bass	Drums	Keyboard	Location(s) (dates)	Other acts	Ref.
Nov 1999– Jan 2000	Fragility v1.0	Robin Finck	Danny Lohner	Jerome Dillon	Charlie Clouser	Europe, Japan (16 dates)	Support: Atari Teenage Riot, Skingame	
Jan–Feb; 2000	Big Day Out 2000	Robin Finck	Danny Lohner	Jerome Dillon	Charlie Clouser	New Zealand, Australia (6 dates)	With: Red Hot Chili Peppers, Foo Fighters, Atari Teenage Riot, Blink-182, The Chemical Brothers	
Apr–Jul; 2000	Fragility v2.0	Robin Finck	Danny Lohner	Jerome Dillon	Charlie Clouser	North America, Europe (53 dates)	Support: A Perfect Circle	

== Live: With Teeth (2005–2006) ==
Duration	Tour leg	Band lineup				Location(s) (dates)	Other acts	Ref.
Duration	Tour leg	Guitar	Bass	Drums	Keyboard	Location(s) (dates)	Other acts	Ref.
Mar–May; 2005	Spring club tour	Aaron North	Jeordie White	Jerome Dillon	Alessandro Cortini	North America, England (30 dates)	Support: Carre Callaway, The Dresden Dolls	
Jun–Aug; 2005	Summer international tour	Aaron North	Jeordie White	Jerome Dillon	Alessandro Cortini	Europe, Japan, Australia (26 dates)	Support: The Dresden Dolls, Saul Williams, Eagles of Death Metal, The Bird Blobs, The Follow	
Sep – Dec; 2005	Fall arena tour	Aaron North	Jeordie White	Jerome Dillon	Alessandro Cortini	North America, South America (45 dates)	Support: Queens of the Stone Age, Autolux, Death from Above 1979	
Sep – Dec; 2005	Fall arena tour	Aaron North	Jeordie White	Alex Carapetis (Note: Prior to Carapetis' joining, Josh Freese was briefly the drummer for a few shows, but he was not intended to be a full-time member. Freese later replaced Carapetis and joined the band as a full-time member however.)	Alessandro Cortini	North America, South America (45 dates)	Support: Queens of the Stone Age, Autolux, Death from Above 1979	
Sep – Dec; 2005	Fall arena tour	Aaron North	Jeordie White	Josh Freese	Alessandro Cortini	North America, South America (45 dates)	Support: Queens of the Stone Age, Autolux, Death from Above 1979	
Feb–Apr; 2006	Winter arena tour	Aaron North	Jeordie White	Josh Freese	Alessandro Cortini	North America (32 dates)	Support: Moving Units, Saul Williams	
May–Jul; 2006	Summer amphitheatre tour	Aaron North	Jeordie White	Josh Freese	Alessandro Cortini	North America (31 dates)	Support: Saul Williams, TV on the Radio, Bauhaus, Peaches	

== Performance 2007 (2007) ==
Duration	Tour leg	Band lineup				Location(s) (dates)	Other acts	Ref.
Duration	Tour leg	Guitar	Bass	Drums	Keyboard	Location(s) (dates)	Other acts	Ref.
Feb–May 2007	Spring tour	Aaron North	Jeordie White	Josh Freese	Alessandro Cortini	Europe, Australia, Japan (52 dates)	Support: The Popo, Ladytron, Serena Maneesh	
Aug–Sep 2007	Summer / Fall international tour	Aaron North	Jeordie White	Josh Freese	Alessandro Cortini	Europe, Asia, Australia, Hawaii (28 dates)	With: Foo Fighters, Silversun Pickups^{[I]} Support: Intacto, Theodor Bastard, Serena Maneesh, The Dandy Warhols, Ladytron, Alec Empire, Unkle, The Lovesong, White Rose Movement I Dublin, August 22, 2007.	

== Lights in the Sky (2008) ==
Duration	Tour leg	Band lineup				Location(s) (dates)	Other acts	Ref.
Duration	Tour leg	Guitar	Bass	Drums	Keyboard	Location(s) (dates)	Other acts	Ref.
July–Dec; 2008^{[I]}	Over North America	Robin Finck	Justin; Meldal- Johnsen	Josh Freese	Alessandro Cortini	North America (60 dates)	Support: A Place to Bury Strangers, Boris, The Bug, Crystal Castles, Deerhunter, Does It Offend You, Yeah?, Health, White Williams	
October 2008^{[I]}	Over South America	Robin Finck	Justin; Meldal- Johnsen	Josh Freese	Alessandro Cortini	South America (3 dates)	Support: Vigilante	

I The North American and South American legs overlapped in mid-October.

== Wave Goodbye (2009) ==
Duration	Tour leg	Band lineup				Location(s) (dates)	Other acts	Ref.
Duration	Tour leg	Guitar	Bass	Drums	Keyboard	Location(s) (dates)	Other acts	Ref.
Feb–March 2009	2009 Tour	Robin Finck	Justin Meldal-Johnsen	Ilan Rubin	— (Note: Various members shared the role of keyboardist during the Wave Goodbye 2009 tours.)	Australia & New Zealand (8 dates)	Support: The Naked and Famous, Jaguar Love	
May–August 2009	NIN | JA 2009	Robin Finck	Justin Meldal-Johnsen	Ilan Rubin	—	North America, Europe, Asia (59 dates)	With: Jane's Addiction; Support: Street Sweeper Social Club	
August–September 2009	Wave Goodbye	Robin Finck	Justin Meldal-Johnsen	Ilan Rubin	—	New York City, Chicago, Los Angeles, Toronto (11 dates)	Support: The Horrors, Mew, Alec Empire, Health, Queen Kwong, io echo	

== Twenty Thirteen Tour (2013–2014) ==
Duration	Tour leg	Band lineup					Location(s) (dates)	Other acts	Ref.
Duration	Tour leg	Guitar	Bass	Drums	Keyboard	Backing vocals	Location(s) (dates)	Other acts	Ref.
July–September 2013	Twenty Thirteen	Robin Finck	Josh Eustis	Ilan Rubin	Alessandro Cortini	—	North America, Europe, Asia (16 dates)		
September–November 2013	Tension 2013	Robin Finck; Josh Eustis	Pino Palladino	Ilan Rubin	Alessandro Cortini	Lisa Fischer; Sharlotte Gibson	North America (34 dates)	Support: Godspeed You! Black Emperor/Explosions in the Sky (31 dates); Autolux (2 dates)	
February–August 2014	NIN 2014	Robin Finck	— (Note: Various members shared the role of bassist during the NIN 2014 tour.)	Ilan Rubin	Alessandro Cortini	—	North America, Europe, Asia, Oceania, Latin America (69 dates)	With: Queens of the Stone Age, Soundgarden; Support: Brody Dalle, Cold Cave, Oneohtrix Point Never, The Dillinger Escape Plan	

== The Trilogy Tour (2017–2018) ==
Duration	Tour leg	Band lineup				Location(s) (dates)	Other acts	Ref.
Duration	Tour leg	Guitars	Bass	Drums	Keyboard	Location(s) (dates)	Other acts	Ref.
July–December 2017	I Can't Seem to Wake Up 2017	Robin Finck	Alessandro Cortini	Ilan Rubin	Atticus Ross	North America (8 dates)	Support: Tobacco (2 dates)	
June–December 2018	Cold and Black and Infinite 2018	Robin Finck	Alessandro Cortini	Ilan Rubin	Atticus Ross	North America, Europe, Asia (59 dates)	Support: Queen Kwong, Black Moth Super Rainbow, Kite Base, Jesus and Mary Chain	

== U.S. 2022 & U.K. 2022 (2022) ==
Duration	Tour leg	Band lineup				Location(s) (dates)	Other acts	Ref.
Duration	Tour leg	Guitar	Bass	Drums	Keyboard	Location(s) (dates)	Other acts	Ref.
April–May 2022	U.S. Spring Tour	Robin Finck	Alessandro Cortini	Ilan Rubin	Atticus Ross	North America (8 dates)	Support: Boy Harsher and 100 gecs	
June 2022	U.K. Summer Tour	Robin Finck	Alessandro Cortini	Ilan Rubin	Atticus Ross	Europe (6 dates)	Support: Nitzer Ebb and Yves Tumor	
September–November 2022	U.S. Fall Tour	Robin Finck	Alessandro Cortini	Ilan Rubin	Atticus Ross	North America (12 dates)	Support: Nitzer Ebb and Yves Tumor	

== Peel It Back (2025–2026) ==
Duration	Tour leg	Band lineup				Location(s) (dates)	Other acts	Ref.
Duration	Tour leg	Guitar	Bass	Drums	Keyboard	Location(s) (dates)	Other acts	Ref.
June–July 2025	Peel It Back Europe	Robin Finck	Alessandro Cortini	Ilan Rubin	Atticus Ross	Europe (16 dates)	Support: Boys Noize	
August–September 2025	Peel It Back US	Robin Finck	Alessandro Cortini	Josh Freese	Atticus Ross	North America (26 dates)	Support: Boys Noize	
February-March 2026	Peel It Back US	Robin Finck	Stu Brooks	Josh Freese	Atticus Ross	North America (22 dates)	Support: Boys Noize	

== See also ==
- List of Nine Inch Nails live-band members
- Nine Inch Nails live performances
