= Visqueen (album) =

Studio album by Unsane
- Released: March 13, 2007
- Genre: Post-hardcore, punk metal
- Length: 42:03
- Label: Ipecac
- Producer: Andrew Schneider, Unsane

Unsane chronology
| Blood Run (2005) | Visqueen (2007) | Wreck (2012) |

Visqueen is Unsane's sixth studio album, released in 2007 Ipecac Recordings.

== Reception ==
Professional ratings
Review scores
| Source | Rating |
|---|---|
| AllMusic | 3/5 stars |
| Alternative Press | 4.5/5 stars |
| Pitchfork | 5.0/10 |
| Scene Point Blank | 4/5 stars |

John Bush from AllMusic said that "it had to be questioned whether the band was getting a little too refined for the tastes of its fans", adding that while "the material isn't as powerful as Blood Run, [...] the trio stretches out its sound in spots". Marc Masters from Pitchfork Media said that "the trio's patented sound [...] remains intact, albeit in slicker form. The problem is that this style holds no surprises 18 years after Unsane first coined it."

== Track listing ==
1. "Against the Grain" – 4:40
2. "Last Man Standing" – 3:34
3. "This Stops at the River" – 2:48
4. "Only Pain" – 3:33
5. "No One" – 2:45
6. "Windshield" – 3:58
7. "Shooting Clay" – 3:07
8. "Line on the Wall" – 3:45
9. "Disdain" – 2:37
10. "Eat Crow" – 2:33
11. "East Broadway" – 8:43

== Personnel ==
- Chris Spencer – guitar, vocals
- Dave Curran – bass, vocals
- Vincent Signorelli – drums
