= Big Electric Metal Bass Face =

Studio album by Die Warzau
- Released: October 1, 1991
- Studio: Various: Chicago Trax; (Chicago, IL); D&D Studios; (New York City, NY); Streeterville; (Chicago, IL)
- Genre: EBM; industrial rock
- Length: 63:20
- Label: Atlantic/Fiction
- Producer: Van Christie; Jim Marcus

Die Warzau chronology
Disco Rigido (1989)	Big Electric Metal Bass Face (1991)	Engine (1995)

Singles from Big Electric Metal Bass Face
- 1. "Funkopolis" Released: 1991; 2. "Never Again" Released: 1992

Big Electric Metal Bass Face is the second studio album by Die Warzau, released on October 1, 1991 by Atlantic and Fiction Records. The band introduced elements of funk music and the speeches of American politicians into their sample library to musically articulate topics concerning race relations such as "Funkopolis". Percussionist Chris Vrenna, who had performed on Nine Inch Nails' 1989 debut Pretty Hate Machine, joined the band to collaborate on tour and to record in studio.

== Reception ==
Professional ratings
Review scores
Source	Rating
AllMusic	2/5 stars

Tim Griggs of AllMusic gave Big Electric Metal Bass Face a mostly negative review and called the songs "not as heavy as other industrial recordings; in fact, considering the name of the band and album title, some are wimpier than they should be." Ben Thompson of The Wire was also critical of the album and said "the single 'Funkopolis' is something of a toe-tapper but much of the rest steers perilously close to the little-lamented early 80s college-educated tribal funk essays of Shriekback et al."

A critic at Keyboard was more positive in their review, identifying the band's strength at rhythm arrangements and saying "their mixes are unusually bright: Samples punch, synth saxes honk, Moogish bass lines go yowp-yowp, drums thump, unidentified noises circle and take off, all of them clear and sharp." Mondo 2000 praised the band for developing a jazzy and more quiet and kinetic energy, describing the album as "a dance – till – it – hurts mutant blend of industrial, rap, funk, and house." Similarly, CMJ claimed that the album "not only avoids cliché but manages to evoke a fluid R&B feel throughout."

In comparing the album to Disco Rigido, Tony Fletcher of Trouser Press called "stronger and smarter, a worthy blending of funky rock, chanted vocals, spoken-word samples and proto-electronica" and compared the band favorably to Red Hot Chili Peppers.

== Track listing ==
All tracks are written by Van Christie and Jim Marcus, except "Head" by James Woolley.

No.	Title	Length
1.	"Crack Radio"	4:42
2.	"Funkopolis"	3:59
3.	"Never Again"	4:30
4.	"Shock Box"	3:27
5.	"Brand New Convertible Car"	6:25
6.	"Burning"	4:34
7.	"All Cut Up"	3:37
8.	"Coming Down" (live)	4:33
9.	"My Pretty Little Girlfriend"	6:20
10.	"Red All Over"	4:55
11.	"Pig City"	4:19
12.	"Dying in Paradise"	5:31
13.	"Suck It Up"	2:52
14.	"Head"	3:34

== Personnel ==
Adapted from the Big Electric Metal Bass Face liner notes.

Die Warzau

- Van Christie (as The Atomic Cowboy) – guitar, keyboards, sampler, programming, production, engineering, mixing
- Jim Marcus – lead vocals, drums, percussion, electronics, horns, production, mixing, design

Additional performers

- Dave Andrew (as The White Guy) – additional percussion
- Burle Avant (as DJ (Durpilicious)) – turntables, additional vocals, backing vocals
- Chris Bruce – bass guitar
- Jim Romano (as Cheese) – additional vocals
- Tom Stranich (as Wolverine) – additional vocals
- Tim Titsworth (as Happy Titsworth) – additional vocals
- Chris Vrenna (as Pooboy) – additional percussion
- Jennifer Wilcox (as Levi) – additional vocals
- James Woolley (as Bear) – percussion, additional keyboards, backing vocals

Production and design

- Tom Coyne – mastering
- Steve Manno – mixing
- Mike Rogers – mixing
- Steve Spapperi – additional engineering

== Release history ==
Region	Date	Label	Format	Catalog
United States	1991	Atlantic	CD, CS	7 82295
United States	1991	Fiction	CD, CS	82295
Japan	1992	Fiction	CD	POCP-1206
