= Borghild (EP) =

EP by Die Warzau
- Released: September 30, 2009
- Genre: EBM; industrial rock
- Length: 60:00
- Label: Pulseblack
- Producer: Van Christie; Dan Evans; Abel Garibaldi; Jim Marcus; Chris Smits

Die Warzau chronology
Vinyl88 (2008)	Borghild (2009)

Borghild is an EP by Die Warzau, released on September 30, 2009, by Pulseblack. It was given away for a limited time during the release party of I:Scintilla's 2010 album Dying and Falling. It was later made available for sale as a music download on March 20, 2013.

== Track listing ==
All tracks are written by Van Christie, Dan Evans, Abel Garibaldi, Jim Marcus and Chris Smits.

No.	Title	Length
1.	"Big Hit Radio" (Desktop Porn Mix)	10:00
2.	"We Are Electric" (Tens Rod Re-Edit)	10:00
3.	"Insect" (Waspkiller Fetish Mix)	10:00
4.	"Mona Lisa Communista" (Chastity Mix)	10:00
5.	"The Gun Song" (Penile Extension Mix)	10:00
6.	"UNS (Unnatural Selection)" (Unnatural Sex Mix)	10:00

== Personnel ==
Adapted from the Borghild liner notes.

Die Warzau

- Van Christie – lead vocals, instruments, production, recording, mixing, editing
- Dan Evans – instruments, production, recording, mixing, editing
- Abel Garibaldi – instruments, production, recording, mixing, editing
- Jim Marcus – instruments, production, recording, mixing, editing, photography, design
- Chris Smits (as Xmas Smits) – instruments, production, recording, mixing, editing

Production and design

- Brian Gaynor – vocal recording (1)

== Release history ==
Region	Date	Label	Format	Catalog
United States	2009	Pulseblack	CD	PX-000X
United States	2013		DL	
