= Unsane (album) =

Studio album by Unsane
- Released: November 26, 1991
- Recorded: January 16, 1991
- Studio: Fun City (New York City, New York)
- Genre: Noise rock
- Length: 36:52
- Label: Matador
- Producer: Wharton Tiers, Unsane

Unsane chronology
Unsane (1991)	Singles 89–92 (1992)

Unsane is the debut album by Unsane, released on November 26, 1991, through Matador Records. It is the only studio album by the group to feature founding member Charlie Ondras (with the exception of 1989's Improvised Munitions, which didn't get a proper release until 2021). Ondras died of a heroin overdose during the 1992 New Music Seminar in New York during the tour supporting Unsane. The album's cover art, depicting a decapitated corpse on subway tracks, was given to the band from a friend who worked on the investigation for the case.

Death metal band Entombed covered "Vandal-X" on their self-titled compilation album in 1997.

== Reception ==
Professional ratings
Review scores
Source	Rating
AllMusic	4/5 stars
Distorted Sound	9/10
The Encyclopedia of Popular Music	3/5 stars
Kerrang!	4/5 stars
Ox-Fanzine	5/5 stars
Select	4/5 stars

Patrick Kennedy from AllMusic called it a brilliant and daring debut that "assaults the senses like the Swans or Foetus before them, but tempers that art-scum priggishness with clear roots in punk and classic rock."

== Track listing ==
All tracks are written by Unsane.

No.	Title	Length
1.	"Organ Donor"	2:10
2.	"Bath"	2:54
3.	"Maggot"	3:17
4.	"Cracked Up"	2:57
5.	"Slag"	2:43
6.	"Exterminator"	5:55
7.	"Vandal-X"	2:04
8.	"HLL."	2:31
9.	"AZA-2000"	2:33
10.	"Cut"	2:48
11.	"Action Man"	2:28
12.	"White Hand"	4:26
Total length:		36:52

== Personnel ==
Unsane

- Charlie Ondras – drums, lead vocals on "AZA-2000" and "Action Man"
- Pete Shore – bass guitar, backing vocals
- Chris Spencer – lead vocals, guitar

Additional musicians and production

- Simon Bodger – photography
- Wharton Tiers – production, engineering
- Unsane – production
