= Veiled (album) =

Studio album by Leah Andreone
- Released: August 27, 1996
- Genre: Rock, folk
- Length: 46:20
- Label: RCA
- Producer: Rick Neigher

Leah Andreone chronology
| Veiled (1996) | Alchemy (1998) |

Veiled is the first album by the American singer/songwriter Leah Andreone, released in 1996.

== Critical reception ==
Professional ratings
Review scores
| Source | Rating |
|---|---|
| AllMusic | 3/5 stars |

The Knoxville News Sentinel wrote that "Andreone indulges her nasal voice in fits similar to [Alanis] Morissette's, but her stunts seem more shrewdly calculated than charmingly eccentric."

== Track listing ==
All songs by Leah Andreone and Rick Neigher, except where noted.

1. "It's Alright, It's OK"
2. "Happy Birthday"
3. "Mother Tongue"
4. "You Make Me Remember"
5. "Who Are They to Say"
6. "Problem Child"
7. "Come Sunday Morning"
8. "Kiss Me Goodbye"
9. "Hell to Pay" (Leah Andreone, David Andreone, Rick Neigher)
10. "Will You Still Love Me"
11. "Imagining You"

== Personnel ==
- Leah Andreone – vocals
- Rick Neigher – bass guitar, electric guitar, acoustic guitar, keyboards, organ, harmonica
- David Raven – drums
- John Shanks – electric guitar
- Kevin Saviger – keyboards, organ
- Rami Jaffee – organ
- Debra Dobkin – percussion
- Neal Avron – trumpet

== Chart performance ==
| Chart (1996–1997) | Peak position |
|---|---|
| France (SNEP) | 39 |
| Sweden (Sverigetopplistan) | 45 |
