= Comic Book Whore =

Studio album by Jane Jensen
- Released: October 1, 1996
- Recorded: 1994–1996
- Studio: Canal Street (New York City); Harold Dessau (New York City); Unique (New York City)
- Genre: Alternative rock; industrial music
- Length: 48:16
- Label: Flip; Interscope
- Producer: Craig Kafton

Jane Jensen chronology
Comic Book Whore (1996)	Burner (2000)

Singles from Comic Book Whore
- 1. "More Than I Can" Released: January 17, 1997; 2. "Luv Song" Released: June 20, 1997

Comic Book Whore is the debut solo album by the American musician Jane Jensen. It was released on October 1, 1996, through Flip Records, and re-released through Interscope Records in 1997. Jensen wrote and recorded the album with producer Craig Kafton at various studios in New York City. Intended by Jensen as a departure from the melancholic, mythology-based works of her previous band Oxygiene 23, Comic Book Whore is an alternative rock and industrial music album featuring electronic instrumentation and vocals and direct, conversational lyrics based on her past experiences.

Comic Book Whore was supported by the singles "More Than I Can" and "Luv Song", with the former garnering airplay on college and alternative radio stations. Supported by a live band, Jensen toured the United States and Australia in 1996 and 1997 to promote the album. The album received generally favorable reviews from critics, who praised the songwriting and Jensen's persona, though some felt its lyrics lacked depth and that its second half was lackluster.

== Background and recording ==
Following the disbandment of her previous band Oxygeine 23, Jane Jensen relocated from Chicago to New York City around 1994. Equipped with an 12-string acoustic guitar and a Roland R-8 drum machine, Jensen began making demos with a four-track recorder and played regular shows at a club called The Red Room. Six months later, she met producer Craig Kafton and began working material at his loft recording studio, Canal Street. Later on, Kafton asked Jensen to sing over a track he was working on, which became the first song written for Comic Book Whore, "More Than I Can". Jensen credited the song with "open[ing] the floodgate for [the] album to pour out".

Recording sessions for Comic Book Whore were held at Canal Street, Harold Dessau Studios, and Unique Recording Studios in New York City. Jensen and Kafton wrote and recorded material simultaneously, with their approaches to writing differing between songs. They would both come up with structures and parts separately before attempting to mix them, or would add to parts the other had written. Jensen performed guitar and would sketch out a draft of a song—adding drum machines and occasionally samples in the process—on her computer before going to the studio. Kafton also played guitars and handled percussion, sampling, and programming, the latter two which he worked on using a Compaq computer.

Whilst working on an album by The Hotheads, Kafton played "More Than I Can" for the band's label, Flip Records, who subsequently signed Jensen. Half of Comic Book Whore was written prior to Jensen's signing with Flip, with rest being written thereafter; she and Kafton selected the best of their material for its tracklisting. "Luv Song" was recorded right as the album was being mixed by Jim Janik at Unique Recording Studios, in order to fill up the remaining length of its two-inch recording tape; it was written and recorded in two or three hours. Kafton created a simple bass and drum loop to run till the end of the tape which Jensen sang and played guitar over; parts of her vocal takes were cut and spliced together by Kafton to make the final song.

== Composition ==
Comic Book Whore has been described as alternative rock and industrial music. According to Tech-head Polonski of SLUG, its music combines a "lo-fi bedroom recording feel" with a computerized dance sound. The album's songs feature distorted guitars, drum machines, rhythmic synthesizers and big beat loops. Jensen's vocals are often multitracked or electronically processed. Suzan Colon of Spin likened Jensen to a "high school cheerleader gone industrial" with her "occasional lapses into pop cuteness" and "malevolent-little-girl-lost singing style". Jensen aimed to depart from the melancholic, mythology-based works of Oxygiene 23 and make "more groove and humor-oriented" songs, and said that, besides the vocals, they were meant to stylistically stand out from one another and have no connecting elements or themes. The album's lyrics were based on Jensen's past experiences and relationships; she intended them to be more direct and realistic than Oxygiene 23's, and to come across like a conversation. In an interview with Scene Entertainment Weekly, Jensen cited the authors Kathy Acker and William S. Burroughs as influences on the songwriting with the stream of consciousness qualities of both of their works, and said her "inspiration comes from any strange turn the day may take".

The opening track of Comic Book Whore, "More Than I Can", blends heavy electrobeats and guitars and sees Jensen "[fend] off an obsessive lover", according to Chuck Campbell of the Knoxville News Sentinel. "Luv Song" humorously describes Jensen's ideal boyfriend; her vocals alternate between chattering, laughter, and howling. "King" is an energetic track featuring pop-inflected and electronically altered vocals. Michael C. Mahan of Industrialnation described the song as recalling early punk rock and new wave music. Scene Entertainment Weekly's Karey Ridge Baich highlighted its themes of "love and sex and loathing" as driven by its "paradoxical chorus". "Cowboy" features similar lyrical themes to "Luv Song" and choral, multitracked vocals. "Highway 90" sees Jensen sing stream of consciousness lyrics detailing a drive between Chicago and Indiana over a rolling bassline and distorted guitars, driven by a psychedelic lead riff. Jensen said it was her favorite from Comic Book Whore, feeling it best captured the conversational mood she attempted to portray with her lyrics across the album. Roger Catlin of the Hartford Courant likened Jensen's "high and single-minded" vocals on "Clumsy" to Throwing Muses singer Kristin Hersh. "Superstar" contains a folk rock guitar intro, whilst album closer "Be Just Sound" features "phantasmal harmonies" that Campbell likened to Siouxsie and the Banshees.

== Release and promotion ==
Comic Book Whore was released through Flip Records on October 1, 1996. One month prior, Interscope Records acquired the album from Flip, and re-released it in 1997. Interscope promoted Comic Book Whore through retail and print advertisements, particularly in the Southwestern United States. On January 17, 1997, "More Than I Can" was released as its lead radio single, followed by "Luv Song" on June 20. The album, and particularly "More Than I Can", garnered airplay on college and alternative radio stations.

To promote the album, Jensen toured with a live band, featuring Kafton on bass, former Siouxsie and the Banshees member John Valentine Carruthers on guitar, and Duard Kleyn on drums. After opening for the Butthole Surfers in October 1996, Jensen embarked on a headlining tour of the Northeastern United States. In early 1997, she toured as a supporting act for Better Than Ezra, played various radio shows, and performed at the South by Southwest (SXSW) festival. Following another headlining United States tour, Jensen toured Australia in July 1997. She also performed shows with L7, Green Day, Gravity Kills, and Porno for Pyros in support of the album.

== Critical reception ==
Professional ratings
Review scores
Source	Rating
AllMusic	3/5 stars
The Austin Chronicle	3/5 stars
Christgau's Consumer Guide	(3-star Honorable Mention)
Knoxville News-Sentinel	4/5 stars
St. Petersburg Times	B

Comic Book Whore received generally favorable reviews from critics. Mahan of Industrialnation praised the album for presenting a heavy modern rock sound with "well done" instrumentation and "unpretentious" vocals, whilst Richard Harrington of The Washington Post highlighted its "supple-yet-catchy sound". Samantha Spinrad of the St. Petersburg Times called the album an "impresive debut", highlighting Jensen's "charm and intelligence" and stating it would appeal to fans of riot grrrl, techno and indie rock, whilst Campbell of the Knoxville News Sentinel believed the "eccentric" and "funny" album could garner a cult following if it received enough attention. Baich of Scene Entertainment Weekly viewed Jensen's lyrics as the album's driving force after its vocals, and believed those who did not understand her "wandering wit" were "devoid [...] of insight". Robert Christgau gave the album a three-star "honorable mention", describing Jensen as " 'twixt Courtney Love and Alanis Morrisette on the noise and normality scales, only sexier".

Tom Demalon of AllMusic highlighted Comic Book Whore's "melodic and insistent" songwriting and widespread hooks but felt Jensen's lyrics lacked depth. Mark Jenkins, also of The Washington Post, likewise said that despite Jensen's "striking" vocals, "what she has to say usually isn't". Andy Langer of The Austin Chronicle considered the album to be a "truly clever debut" and called "More Than I Can" and "Luv Song" an "unlikely set of anthems"; he criticized the album's dull, "semi-avant-garde closing section", but said Jensen's "confident quirk is just seductive enough to make you forget". Campbell similarly felt it lost direction in Jensen's "cartoonish" streams of consciousness at its end, but she "fights her way back into the spotlight through sheer determination". Chuck Eddy, writing in LA Weekly, criticized most of the album as "sappy singer-songwriting done as amorphous studio-metal mouthwash" and felt it would have worked better as an extended play (EP) containing its first five or six songs; he compared the rest of its material unfavorably with Björk.

== Track listing ==
All tracks are written by Jane Jensen and Craig Kafton.

No.	Title	Length
1.	"More Than I Can"	4:00
2.	"Luv Song"	4:13
3.	"King"	3:52
4.	"Cowboy"	3:59
5.	"Highway 90"	4:49
6.	"Listen"	4:04
7.	"Blank Sugar"	5:05
8.	"Dream Ridiculous Implausible"	4:47
9.	"Clumsy"	3:20
10.	"Superstar"	5:17
11.	"Be Just Sound"	4:50
Total length:		48:16

== Personnel ==
Adapted from liner notes.

Musicians
- Jane Jensen - vocals, guitars, programming, samples
- Craig Kafton - guitars, programming, samples, percussion
- Richard Fortus - guitar (5, 8)
- Jim Janik - bass (1)
- Greg Yates - drums (1)
- Duard Kleyn - drums (3, 5)
- Steve Barber - mellotron, strings (11)

Production

- Craig Kafton - production, engineering
- Alissa Myhowich - assistant engineer
- Jim Janik - engineering, mixing
- John Fryer - mixing (10)
- Howie Weinberg - mastering

Artwork

- Annalee Valencia - artwork, design, illustrations
- Jane Jensen - inside cartoon
- Wendy Idele - photography
