= Convenience (album) =

Studio album by Die Warzau
- Released: October 10, 2004
- Studio: Various: Alien Soundscapes; (Chicago, IL); Pulseblack Studios; (Chicago, IL); Warzone Labs; (Chicago, IL)
- Genre: Synthpop; industrial rock
- Length: 67:54
- Label: Pulseblack
- Producer: Van Christie; Dan Evans; Jim Marcus; Abel Garibaldi

Die Warzau chronology
Engine (1995)	Convenience (2004)	Vinyl88 (2008)

Convenience is the fourth studio album by Die Warzau, released on October 10, 2004 by Pulseblack.

== Reception ==
Professional ratings
Review scores
Source	Rating
AllMusic	2.5/5 stars

Stewart Mason of AllMusic criticized Convenience as being misdirected and lackluster, saying it "sounds in large part like a tentative attempt to introduce Die Warzau's sample-happy dance-industrial aesthetic into a world where industrial is entirely yesterday's news." Hybrid Magazine praised the clean production quality but criticized the music for being too accessible. Similarly Mike Schiller of PopMatters praised the Die Warzau for embracing a more pop-oriented direction but disproved of their excessive stylistic divergences. Tony Fletcher of Trouser Press commended the album and said "surprising, original and appealing, Convenience breaks the mold and begins a new phase for a band that is clearly unburdened by stylistic stereotypes."

Kim Owens of Kaffeine Buzz commended the band for reinventing itself, saying "Although it may alienate the true fans of the group's hardcore material of the past, I see it as a brave, creative, and welcomed move instead of taking the predictable path." Steve Mangione of mxdwn Music noted Jim Marcus's vocals and Van Christie's production as being the strong points of the album and said "layers of samples, crunchy noise, tight beats and sinister basslines propel the songs forward in a delectably dismal blend of electronica and darkwave."

== Track listing ==
All tracks are written by Van Christie, Dan Evans, Abel Garibaldi and Jim Marcus, except "Glare" by Marcel Henderson, "Superbuick" by J.C. Stokes and "Kleen" by Mike Gray.

No.	Title	Length
1.	"Crusaders"	4:40
2.	"Go Going Gone"	4:28
3.	"Permission"	4:28
4.	"Radiation Babies"	4:49
5.	"Glare"	4:29
6.	"Bliss"	4:01
7.	"Linoleum"	3:43
8.	"Superbuick"	4:09
9.	"Terrorform"	4:25
10.	"Curious"	4:59
11.	"Gone Chemical"	3:51
12.	"Kleen"	4:18
13.	"King of Rock and Roll"	4:30
14.	"Come as You Are"	3:03
15.	"As We Are So We Are"	4:27
16.	"Shine (All Good Girls, Part 2)"	4:47

== Personnel ==
Adapted from the Convenience liner notes.

Die Warzau

- Van Christie – instruments, production, recording, mixing
- Dan Evans – instruments, production, recording, mixing
- Abel Garibaldi – instruments, production, recording, mixing
- Jim Marcus – lead vocals, production, instruments

Additional performers

- Biff Blumfengagne – instruments
- Sanyung Cho – instruments
- Ted Cho – instruments
- Chris Connelly – instruments
- Rick Dody – instruments
- Andre Filardo – instruments
- Chris Greene – instruments
- Janina Hanna – instruments
- Marcel Henderson – instruments
- Matt Marcoto – instruments
- Zoë McKenzie – instruments
- Jason McNinch – instruments
- Chris Morford – instruments
- J.C. Stokes – instruments
- Louis Svitek – instruments
- DJ. Redlocks – instruments
- Mary Dee Reynolds – instruments
- Vinnie Signorelli – instruments
- Kevin Temple – instruments
- Mars Williams – instruments
- Matt Warren – instruments
- James Woolley – instruments

Production and design

- Tom Coyne – mastering

== Release history ==
Region	Date	Label	Format	Catalog
United States	2004	Pulseblack	CD, DL	PX-001
