= Engine (Die Warzau album) =

Studio album by Die Warzau
- Released: February 28, 1995
- Recorded: 1994
- Studios: Warzone 1 (Chicago, Illinois)
- Genres: EBM; industrial rock
- Length: 74:42
- Label: TVT/Wax Trax!
- Producers: Van Christie; Jim Marcus; Jason McNinch; Matt Warren

Die Warzau chronology
Big Electric Metal Bass Face (1991)	Engine (1995)	Convenience (2004)

Singles from Engine
- 1. "Liberated" Released: 1994; 2. "All Good Girls" Released: 1995

Engine is the third studio album by Die Warzau, released on February 28, 1995, by TVT and Wax Trax! Records. It was the band's first album in over two years and upon release was considered a masterpiece of industrial music.

== Reception ==
Professional ratings
Review scores
Source	Rating
AllMusic	4.5/5 stars

William Cooper of AllMusic championed Engine as one of the greatest industrial albums of all times and a marked improvement over the band's previous output in both sonic and stylistic variety. He calling the album "a major leap forward for Die Warzau, as it contains some of its most hard-hitting (and surprisingly pop-friendly) material" and that "the mixture of moods and musical approach shows astonishing artistic depth." Alternative Press praised the Die Warzau's musical craftmanship and careful attention to details, saying "with Engine they've achieved true mastery of the electronic craft" and "the skilled mixings of genres and styles is mere child's play for them." Option lauded the band for complex configuration of funk, free jazz, house and world music in complex configurations but decried the shallowness of the band's message, saying "Engine may be loaded with advanced socialist ideals and sharp commentary on such horrid sins as materialism and oppression, but the only people who are going to stand up and listen are the already techno-converted." Tony Fletcher of Trouser Press said the album "gets busy with crashing beats, distorted vocals and disorienting sonic effects" and "what holds the disparate pieces together is invention and an overriding sense of fun. Even with the air is heavy, the mood stays upbeat."

== Track listing ==
All tracks are written by Van Christie, John Quesenberry and Jim Marcus, except where noted.

No.	Title	Writer(s)	Length
1.	"Missing It"		4:17
2.	"Liberated"		5:11
3.	"Lizardo Placentis"		6:21
4.	"Muck"	Svitek	5:24
5.	"Cyberdelianoncorborundum"	Wilcox	4:50
6.	"Grounded"		7:50
7.	"Heroin A.D."		4:54
8.	"Belly"	Randall	6:17
9.	"Ultra Planet"	McNinch, Warren	4:38
10.	"Pughead (Bad Acid Animals)"	Kizys	3:02
11.	"All Good Girls"		6:21
12.	"Material"		4:57
13.	"Shakespeare"		4:00
14.	"Amphibious"		5:31
15.	"America"	Agne, Chrisman, Levy, McNinch, Svitek, Warren, Williams	1:01
16.	"Untitled"		0:06

== Accolades ==
Year	Publication	Country	Accolade	Rank
1995	CMJ New Music Monthly	United States	"Dance"	14
1995	CMJ New Music Report	United States	"Radio Top 150"	78

== Personnel ==
Adapted from the Engine liner notes.

Die Warzau

- Van Christie – guitar, keyboards, noises, production, engineering
- Jim Marcus – lead vocals, drums, percussion, bass guitar, production
- Jason McNinch – electronics, guitar, production, engineering

Additional performers

- Dan Agne – voice
- Martin Atkins – additional drums
- Nanette Cichon – piano
- Jerry – steel drum
- Algis Kizys – bass guitar
- Jason More – additional percussion
- Chris Randall – additional programming
- Vincent Signorelli – additional drums
- Louis Svitek – additional guitar
- Matt Warren – turntables, additional programming
- Jennifer Wilcox (as Levi Wilcox) – additional vocals
- Charles Levi (as Levi Levi) - bass guitar
- Mars Williams – horns

Production and design

- Eric Arway – additional engineering
- Vanessa Cook – additional engineering
- Tom Coyne – mastering
- Steve Krason (as Mudhead) – additional engineering
- Steve Levy – additional engineering
- Scott Ramsayer – additional engineering
- Matt Warren – additional engineering, production (9)
- Stephen Yates – additional engineering

== Release history ==
Region	Date	Label	Format	Catalog
United States	1995	TVT/Wax Trax!	CD, CS	TVT 7216
