= Disco Rigido =

Studio album by Die Warzau
- Released: October 3, 1989
- Studio: Various: Chicago Trax; (Chicago, IL); River North; (Chicago, IL)
- Genres: EBM; industrial rock
- Length: 40:25
- Label: Fiction/PolyGram
- Producers: Van Christie; Jim Marcus; Steve Spapperi

Die Warzau chronology
Disco Rigido (1989)	Big Electric Metal Bass Face (1991)

Singles from Disco Rigido
- 1. "Land of the Free" Released: 1989; 2. "Welcome to America" Released: 1989; 3. "I've Got to Make Sense" Released: 1989; 4. "Bodybag"/"Shake Down" Released: 1990; 5. "Strike to the Body" Released: 1990

Disco Rigido is the debut studio album of Die Warzau, released on October 3, 1989 by Fiction and PolyGram. Van Christie claimed that the band wanted to integrate music that breaks racial barriers into compositions their audience could listen to us as much as dance.

== Reception ==
Professional ratings
Review scores
Source	Rating
AllMusic	2/5 stars

AllMusic gave Disco Rigido a negative mark of two out of five possible stars. More positive in their critique of the album was Trouser Press, who identified Die Warzau's strength for combining rhythm and samples and claimed that "the group's political agenda never gets in the way of the fun." The album made CMJ's "Jackpot" picks in October 1989, claiming that "Die Warzau could be poised to fill the void on dancefloors" left behind after fellow Chicagoan Al Jourgenson "turned in his industrial-strength samplers and synth grooves for a sadomasochistic metal guitar crunch."

== Track listing ==
All tracks are written by Van Christie and Jim Marcus.

Other Side
No.	Title	Length
1.	"Welcome to America"	4:56
2.	"Man Is Meat"	5:35
3.	"Jack Hammer"	5:14
4.	"Bodybag"	4:29
5.	"Sexus"	1:03

This Side
No.	Title	Length
1.	"Strike to the Body"	3:49
2.	"I've Got to Make Sense"	5:10
3.	"National Security"	1:15
4.	"Shake Down"	4:37
5.	"Tear It Down"	4:17

CD track listing
No.	Title	Length
1.	"Welcome to America"	4:56
2.	"Man Is Meat"	5:35
3.	"Jack Hammer"	5:14
4.	"Bodybag"	4:29
5.	"Sexus"	1:03
6.	"Money After All"	7:05
7.	"Strike to the Body"	3:49
8.	"I've Got to Make Sense"	5:10
9.	"National Security"	1:15
10.	"Shake Down"	4:37
11.	"Tear It Down"	4:17
12.	"Bodybag" (Dub Edit)	3:59

Bonus tracks
No.	Title	Length
13.	"Free Radio Africa"	3:03
14.	"Y Tagata en Situ"	5:40
15.	"Cross Burning Part Two"	2:24
16.	"Land of the Free"	5:04

== Personnel ==
Adapted from the Disco Rigido liner notes.

Die Warzau

- Van Christie – guitar, synthesizer, sampler, computer, production, editing
- Jim Marcus – lead vocals, percussion, noises, production

Additional performers

- Stevo George – additional percussion (B5)
- Crystal Meth – vocals (B4)
- Mel Hammond – turntables
- The Hellfire Anti-Christian Choir – vocals (A2)
- Jesse Jackson – voice (B2)
- Jennifer Wilcox – additional vocals (A1, B1)

Production and design

- Tom Coyne – mastering
- Cy Price – additional engineering
- Dave Sears – additional engineering
- Steve Spapperi – production, engineering

== Release history ==
Region	Date	Label	Format	Catalog
United States	1989	PolyGram	CD, CS, LP	841 251
United States	1989	Fiction	CD, CS, LP	841 251
Europe	1989	Fiction	CD, LP	FIX 15, 839 673
Europe	1989	Fiction/Polydor	CS	FIX 15, 839 673
