= The Cutthroats 9 =

American band

- Origin: California, United States
- Genre: Punk rock
- Years active: 2000
- Label: Man's Ruin Records
- Members: Chris Spencer; Mark Laramee; Billy Ropple; Dave Curran; Will Carroll

The Cutthroats 9 is a band formed by Chris Spencer of Unsane when he moved to California. Their first album was called The Cutthroats 9 and also came out on Man's Ruin. The lineup for this recording featured Spencer on guitar/vocals, Unsane bassist Dave Curran, plus Mark Laramie and Will Carroll on guitar and drums respectively. They followed it up with a six song EP that came out on Reptilian Records with Chris (guitar), Mark (bass) and Will (drums). The band toured heavily in 2001/2002, with Tony Baumeister replacing Laramie on bass in early 2002. Touring became infrequent after Unsane reunited in 2003, but a few tours followed over the next several years. In 2014, Chris, Will and Tony reconvened to record "Dissent," their first album in 13 years, released on Lamb Unlimited Records, and later Reptilian Records. More sporadic touring followed, but the band appears to be inactive at the moment.

== Band members ==
- Guitar/vocals - Chris Spencer
- Drums - Will Carroll
- Bass - Tony Baumeister

== Discography (incomplete) ==
- You Should Be Dead (Reptilian Records) - single, 1999
- The Cutthroats 9 (Man's Ruin Records) - full-length album, 2000
- Anger Management (Reptilian Records) - EP, 2001
- Dissent (Reptilian Records) - full-length album, 2014
