= Oxygiene 23 =

American trance music group

- Origin: Chicago, Illinois, United States
- Genres: Trance; new-age
- Years active: 1993–1995
- Label: Fifth Colvmn
- Past members: Van Christie; Jane Jensen; Jim Marcus
- Website: holmesives.com

Oxygiene 23 were an American trance music group based out of Chicago, Illinois. The nucleus of the band comprised keyboardist Van Christie, vocalist Jane Jensen and wind player and percussionist Jim Marcus. The theme of the band's somber compositions was informed by mythology and new-age music. The band released one studio album titled Blue in 1995 for Fifth Colvmn Records.

== History ==
Oxygiene 23 was formed in Chicago by musicians Van Christie, Jane Jensen and Jim Marcus. Marcus and Christie were still writing and performing in Die Warzau when they recruited vocalist and released the song "Sacrifice" in 1993 for the Invisible Records compilation Can You See It Yet?. In 1995 Oxygiene 23 released their debut full-length studio album Blue for Fifth Colvmn Records. The album was recorded with the contributions of Christopher Hall from Stabbing Westward and Mars Williams from The Waitresses. That year the song "Good for You" from their debut was released on the various artist compilation Forced Cranial Removal by Fifth Colvmn Records. After their debut Oxygiene 23's members turned their attention to other projects, with Jim Marcus and Van Christie returning to Die Warzau and Jane Jensen releasing her solo debut Comic Book Whore in 1996 for Interscope Records.

== Discography ==
Studio albums

- Blue (1995, Fifth Colvmn)

Compilation appearances

- Can You See It Yet? (1993 Invisible)
- Forced Cranial Removal (1995 Fifth Colvmn)
