= Amrep Xmas =

Live album by Unsane
- Released: June 24, 1997
- Recorded: December 20, 1996
- Studio: The Turf (St. Paul, Minnesota)
- Genre: Noise rock
- Label: Man's Ruin

Unsane chronology
Scattered, Smothered & Covered (1995)	Amrep Xmas (1997)	Occupational Hazard (1998)

Amrep Xmas is Unsane's first live album, released in 1997 through Man's Ruin Records. "Four Sticks" is a Led Zeppelin cover and appeared originally in their fourth album.

== Reception ==
Professional ratings
Review scores
Source	Rating
Allmusic	2.5/5 stars

Patrick Kennedy from Allmusic wrote about the album: "It certainly captures the manic intensity of the band performing live, but there are a few glitches, including tape drop-outs, an ill-timed reel change, and some small errors in song execution."

== Track listing ==
1. "Sick"
2. "Straight"
3. "Out"
4. "No Soul"
5. "Can't See"
6. "Body Bomb"
7. "Test of Faith"
8. "Swim"
9. "Four Sticks"
10. "Empty Cartridge"
11. "Get Off My Back"
12. "Special Guest Appearance"

== Personnel ==
- Dave Curren – bass
- Vincent Signorelli – drums
- Chris Spencer – guitar, vocals
- Dave Garnder – mixing, recording
- Sharon Shelden – photography
- Randy Hawkins – recording
- Frank Kozik – sleeves
