= Alchemy (Leah Andreone album) =

Studio album by Leah Andreone
- Released: September 29, 1998
- Genre: Pop
- Label: RCA
- Producer: Bob Marlette

Leah Andreone chronology
Veiled (1996)	Alchemy (1998)	UNLABELED - The Demos (2006)

Professional ratings
Review scores
Source	Rating
Allmusic	link

Alchemy is Leah Andreone's second full-length album. It contains the song "Lamentation", which was used on the FOX network television show So You Think You Can Dance.

== Track listing ==
All songs by Leah Andreone

1. "Sunny Day"
2. "Swallow Me"
3. "Bow Down"
4. "Starstruck Bastard"
5. "Porn"
6. "Tighten It Up"
7. "You Don't Exist"
8. "Dive In"
9. "Inconceivable"
10. "Try To Take Your Time"
11. "Pretty Freak"
12. "Fake"
13. "A Private Affair"
14. "Lamentation"
