= Leah Andreone =

American musician (born 1972)

- Born: May 24, 1972 (age 54)
- Origin: San Diego, California, U.S.
- Genres: Rock
- Occupations: Singer, songwriter, record producer
- Years active: 1996–2017

Leah Andreone (born May 24, 1972) is an American musician.

== Early life and education ==
Andreone was born and raised in San Diego, California and attended Helix High School in La Mesa. While attending San Diego State University, she also spent time in Los Angeles, singing at night. Eventually she moved to LA, worked during the day and sang in various clubs at night.

== Career ==
Andreone's first album, Veiled, produced by Rick Neigher, was released by RCA in 1996. It included the hit single "It's Alright, It's OK", which charted in the U.S., peaking at number 57 on the Billboard Hot 100, Europe, and Australia. It was introspective, whereas her next album, Alchemy, was more sexual and intimate. Andreone's lyrics are often treatises on psychology, reflecting her interest in the subject.

After Alchemy, Andreone continued to write and perform. She collaborated with other artists and writers, such as Billy Steinberg, Kevin Fisher, Rob Hyman, Eric Bazilian, Marti Frederiksen, Charlie Clouser (Nine Inch Nails), John Shanks, David Lowery (Cracker), John Lowery (Marilyn Manson), Kasia Livingston, Kay Hanley (Letters To Cleo), Michelle Lewis, and Martha Davis (The Motels). She has also worked as a producer and toured with Lilith Fair.

Andreone contributed a cover version of Carole King's "I Feel the Earth Move" to the Speed 2: Cruise Control soundtrack. She also released the Veiled era song, "We're Not Alone" to the Women For Women 2 album, proceeds from which went to the National Alliance of Breast Cancer Organizations. In August 2008, she released a cover version of "You Are My Sunshine" on the compilation CD UndisCOVERed.

In 2006, Andreone released an EP of new material entitled UNLABELED - The Demos, which contains a cover version of Beyoncé's "Deja Vu". On September 1, 2009, Andreone released a new full-length CD entitled Avalanche (written and produced by Andreone and Kevin Fisher). The album includes a co-written duet with Dan Wilson (Semisonic, Dixie Chicks). A video was released for the first single, "Never Stop Trying".

As of 2021, Andreone had not released any material since a 2017 track via Bandcamp

== Discography ==
=== Albums ===
- Veiled (1996) – FRA #39, SWE #45
- Alchemy (1998)
- Avalanche (2009)

=== Singles and EPs ===
- You Make Me Remember (1996)
- It's Alright, It's OK (1996) – US Hot 100 #57, AUS #99, FRA #30, NED #79
- Who Are They to Say (1997)
- Sunny Day (1998)
- UNLABELED: The Demos (2006)
