= List of awards and nominations received by Trent Reznor and Atticus Ross =

Trent Reznor and Atticus Ross awards and nominations
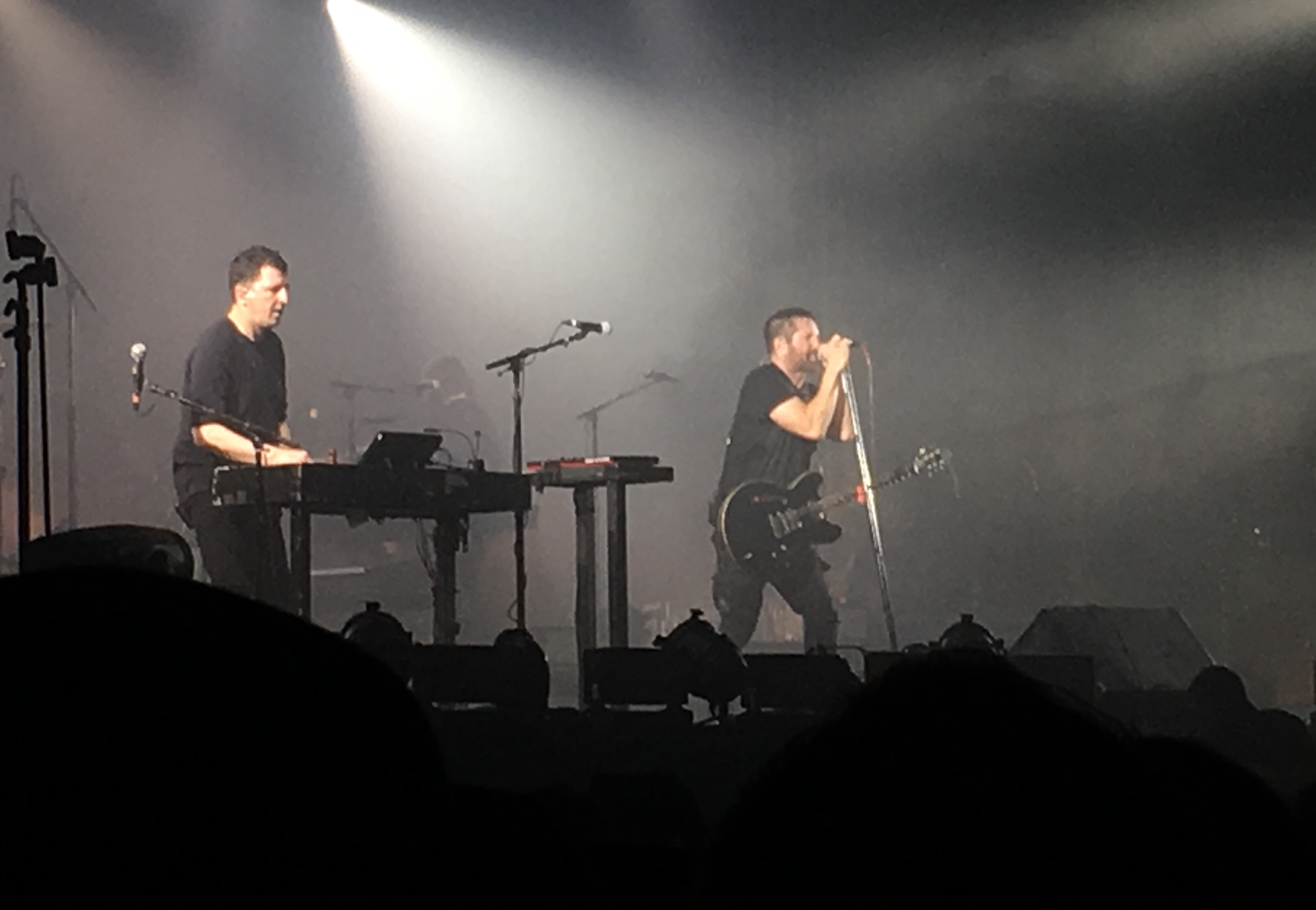
- Atticus Ross (left) and Trent Reznor (right) performing in October 2018
Award	Wins	Nominations
Totals
Academy Awards	2	3
Annie Awards	1	2
British Academy Film Awards	1	3
Critic's Choice Movie Awards	2	5
Golden Globe Awards	3	7
Grammy Awards	2	3
Hollywood Music in Media Awards	1	2
Primetime Emmy Awards	1	2
Satellite Awards	0	3
Various critics associations	12	28
Wins	33
Nominations	87

Trent Reznor and Atticus Ross are the members of the American industrial rock band, Nine Inch Nails, founded in 1988. Together, they have made the score for several movies and television shows.

In 2010 they composed the score for the biographical drama The Social Network marking their first collaboration with director David Fincher, who would become a recurrent collaborator, for their work in the film they won Best Original Score at the 83rd Academy Awards and Golden Globe Award for Best Original Score at the 68th Golden Globe Awards. The following year, they composed the music for the psychological crime thriller film The Girl with the Dragon Tattoo winning the Grammy Award for Best Score Soundtrack for Visual Media at the 55th Annual Grammy Awards. In 2014 the collaborated for the third time with David Fincher for the psychological thriller film Gone Girl.

In 2019 they composed the music for the HBO limited series Watchmen and received nominations for Outstanding Music Composition for a Limited Series, Movie, or Special and Outstanding Original Music and Lyrics at the 72nd Primetime Emmy Awards winning the former. In 2020 they worked again with Fincher composing music for the biographical drama Mank, also they composed the music for the animated Pixar film Soul.

== Major associations ==
=== Academy Awards ===
The Academy Awards are a set of awards given by the Academy of Motion Picture Arts and Sciences annually for excellence of cinematic achievements.

Year	Category	Nominated work	Result	Ref.
2010	Best Original Score	The Social Network	Won	
2020	Best Original Score	Mank	Nominated	
2020	Best Original Score	Soul	Won	

=== BAFTA Awards ===
The British Academy Film Award is an annual award show presented by the British Academy of Film and Television Arts.

Year	Category	Nominated work	Result	Ref.
British Academy Film Awards
2011	Best Original Music	The Girl with the Dragon Tattoo	Nominated	
2020	Best Original Music	Mank	Nominated	
2020	Best Original Music	Soul	Won	

=== Emmy Awards ===
The Primetime Emmy Awards are presented annually by the Academy of Television Arts & Sciences, also known as the Television Academy, to recognize and honor achievements in the television industry.

Year	Category	Nominated work	Result	Ref.
Primetime Emmy Awards
2020	Outstanding Music Composition for a Limited Series, Movie or Special (Original Dramatic Score)	Watchmen (for "It's Summer and We're Running Out of Ice")	Won	
2020	Outstanding Original Music and Lyrics	"The Way It Used to Be" from Watchmen (for "This Extraordinary Being")	Nominated	

=== Golden Globe Awards ===
The Golden Globe Award is an accolade bestowed by the 93 members of the Hollywood Foreign Press Association (HFPA) recognizing excellence in film and television, both domestic and foreign.

Year	Category	Nominated work	Result	Ref.
2010	Best Original Score	The Social Network	Won	
2011	Best Original Score	The Girl with the Dragon Tattoo	Nominated	
2014	Best Original Score	Gone Girl	Nominated	
2020	Best Original Score	Mank	Nominated	
2020	Best Original Score	Soul	Won	
2024	Best Original Score	Challengers	Won	
2024	Best Original Song	"Compress/Repress" from Challengers	Nominated	

=== Grammy Awards ===
The Grammy Award is an annual award show presented by The Recording Academy.

Year	Category	Nominated work	Result	Ref.
2013	Best Score Soundtrack for Visual Media	The Girl with the Dragon Tattoo	Won	
2015	Best Score Soundtrack for Visual Media	Gone Girl	Nominated	
2022	Best Score Soundtrack for Visual Media	Soul	Won (Note: Tied with Carlos Rafael Rivera for The Queen's Gambit.)	
2025	Best Score Soundtrack for Visual Media	Challengers	Nominated	

== Miscellaneous awards ==
=== Annie Awards ===
The Annie Awards are presented annually by ASIFA-Hollywood to recognize excellence in animation.

Year	Category	Nominated work	Result	Ref.
2020	Outstanding Achievement for Music in a Feature Production	Soul	Won	
2024	Outstanding Achievement for Music in a Feature Production	Teenage Mutant Ninja Turtles: Mutant Mayhem	Nominated	

=== Astra Creative Arts Awards ===
The Astra Creative Arts Awards, presented by the Hollywood Creative Alliance, recognize technical achievements in film

Year	Category	Nominated work	Result	Ref.
2024	Best Original Score	Challengers	Nominated	
2024	Best Song	"Compress/Repress" from Challengers	Nominated	

=== Cinema Audio Society Awards ===
The Cinema Audio Society Awards are an annual awards ceremony given by the Cinema Audio Society that honor outstanding achievements in sound mixing.

Year	Category	Nominated work	Result	Ref.
2023	Outstanding Achievement in Sound Mixing for Motion Picture – Animated	Teenage Mutant Ninja Turtles: Mutant Mayhem (Note: Shared with Doc Kane, Michael Semanick, Mark Mangini, Chris Cirino, Chelsea Body.)	Nominated	

=== Critics' Choice Movie Awards ===
The Critics' Choice Movie Awards are presented annually since 1995 by the Broadcast Film Critics Association for outstanding achievements in the cinema industry.

Year	Category	Nominated work	Result	Ref.
2010	Best Score	The Social Network	Won	
2011	Best Score	The Girl with the Dragon Tattoo	Nominated	
2014	Best Score	Gone Girl	Nominated	
2020	Best Score	Mank	Nominated	
2020	Best Score	Soul	Won	
2024	Best Score	Challengers	Won	
2024	Best Song	"Compress/Repress" from Challengers	Nominated	

=== Hollywood Music in Media Awards ===
The Hollywood Music in Media Awards (HMMA) in an organization that honours the best in original music for media.

Year	Category	Nominated work	Result	Ref.
2016	Best Original Score in a Documentary	Before the Flood (with Gustavo Santaolalla and Mogwai)	Nominated	
2016	Best Original Song in a Documentary	"A Minute to Breathe" from Before the Flood	Won	
2020	Best Original Score in a Feature Film	Mank	Nominated	
2020	Best Original Score in an Animated Film	Soul	Won	
2020	Best Soundtrack Album	Soul	Nominated	
2022	Best Original Score in a Feature Film	Empire of Light	Nominated	
2022	Best Original Song in a Feature Film	"(You Made it Feel Like) Home" from Bones and All	Nominated	
2023	Best Original Score – Feature Film	The Killer	Nominated	
2024	Best Original Song – Feature Film	"Compress/Repress" from Challengers	Nominated	
2024	Best Original Score – Feature Film	Challengers	Nominated	

=== Satellite Awards ===
The Satellite Awards are a set of annual awards given by the International Press Academy.

Year	Category	Nominated work	Result	Ref.
2010	Best Original Score	The Social Network	Nominated	
2014	Best Original Score	Gone Girl	Nominated	
2020	Best Original Score	Mank	Nominated	

=== Society of Composers & Lyricists ===
The Society of Composers & Lyricists are an organization founded in 1983 to represent composers and lyricists working in visual media, which presents an annual awards ceremony to recognize the best in music for films, television, and other media.

Year	Category	Nominated work	Result	Ref.
2020	Outstanding Original Score for a Television or Streaming Production	Watchmen	Nominated	
2021	Outstanding Original Score for a Studio Film	Soul	Won	
2021	Outstanding Original Score for a Studio Film	Mank	Nominated	
2021	Outstanding Original Song for Visual Media	"(If Only You Could) Save Me" from Mank	Nominated	
2023	Outstanding Original Song for a Dramatic or Documentary Visual Media Production	"(You Made It Feel Like) Home" from Bones and All	Nominated	
2024	Outstanding Original Song for a Comedy or Musical Visual Media Production	"Compress/Repress" from Challengers	Won	

== Critics associations and festivals ==
Year	Nominated work	Association	Category	Result	Ref.
2010	The Social Network	Boston Society of Film Critics Awards	Best Use of Music in Film	Won	
2010	The Social Network	Los Angeles Film Critics Association Awards	Best Music/Score	Won	
2010	The Social Network	Las Vegas Film Critics Society Awards	Best Score	Won	
2010	The Social Network	St. Louis Gateway Film Critics Association Awards	Best Music (Soundtrack or Score)	Won	
2010	The Social Network	Alliance of Women Film Journalists	Best Film Music or Score	Won	
2010	The Social Network	Denver Film Critics Society Awards	Best Original Score	Nominated	
2010	The Social Network	Washington D.C. Area Film Critics Association Awards	Best Score	Nominated	
2010	The Social Network	San Diego Film Critics Society Awards	Best Score	Nominated	
2010	The Social Network	Houston Film Critics Society Awards	Best Original Score	Nominated	
2010	The Social Network	Chicago Film Critics Association Awards	Best Original Score	Nominated	
2010	The Social Network	Central Ohio Film Critics Association Awards	Best Score	Nominated	
2011	The Girl with the Dragon Tattoo	Alliance of Women Film Journalists	Best Film Music or Score	Won	
2011	The Girl with the Dragon Tattoo	St. Louis Gateway Film Critics Association Awards	Best Scene (for Opening Credits - Immigrant Song)	Won	
2011	The Girl with the Dragon Tattoo	St. Louis Gateway Film Critics Association Awards	Best Music	Nominated	
2011	The Girl with the Dragon Tattoo	Washington D.C. Area Film Critics Association Awards	Best Score	Nominated	
2011	The Girl with the Dragon Tattoo	Chicago Film Critics Association Awards	Best Original Score	Nominated	
2014	Gone Girl	Florida Film Critics Circle Awards	Best Score	Runner-up	
2014	Gone Girl	Phoenix Film Critics Society Awards	Best Score	Nominated	
2014	Gone Girl	San Diego Film Critics Society Awards	Best Score	Nominated	
2014	Gone Girl	St. Louis Gateway Film Critics Association Awards	Best Score	Nominated	
2014	Gone Girl	Washington D.C. Area Film Critics Association Awards	Best Score	Nominated	
2020	Soul	Chicago Film Critics Association Awards	Best Original Score	Won	
2020	Soul	Florida Film Critics Circle	Best Score	Won	
2020	Soul	Houston Film Critics Society Awards	Best Original Score	Won	
2020	Soul	Online Film Critics Society Awards	Best Original Score	Won	
2020	Soul	San Francisco Bay Area Film Critics Circle Awards	Best Score	Won	
2020	Soul	Greater Western New York Film Critics Association Awards	Best Score	Won	
2020	Soul	Indiana Film Journalists Association	Best Musical Score	Nominated	
2020	Soul	Los Angeles Film Critics Association Awards	Best Music	Won	
2020	Soul	St. Louis Gateway Film Critics Association Awards	Best Music Score (with Jon Batiste)	Won	
2020	Mank	St. Louis Gateway Film Critics Association Awards	Best Music Score	Nominated	
2020	Mank	Boston Society of Film Critics Awards	Best Score	Runner-up	
2020	Mank	Chicago Film Critics Association Awards	Best Original Score	Nominated	
2020	Mank	Greater Western New York Film Critics Association Awards	Best Score	Nominated	
2023	The Killer	Venice International Film Festival	Premio Soundtrack Stars Award — Special Mention	Won	
2023	Empire of Light	Florida Film Critics Circle Awards	Best Score	Runner-up	
2023	Empire of Light	Houston Film Critics Society Awards	Best Original Score	Nominated	
2024	Challengers	Los Angeles Film Critics Association Awards	Best Music/Score	Won	
2024	Challengers	Washington D.C. Area Film Critics Association	Best Original Score	Won	
2024	Challengers	Atlanta Film Critics Circle	Best Original Score	Won	
2024	Challengers	Chicago Film Critics Association	Best Original Score	Won	
2024	Challengers	Dallas-Fort Worth Film Critics Association	Best Musical Score	2nd place	
2024	Challengers	St. Louis Film Critics Association	Best Original Score	Runner-up	
2024	Challengers	Seattle Film Critics Society	Best Original Score	Won	
2024	Challengers	Indiana Film Journalists Association	Best Musical Score	Nominated	
2024	Challengers	San Francisco Bay Area Film Critics Circle	Best Original Score	Nominated	
2024	Challengers	Florida Film Critics Circle	Best Score/Soundtrack	Won	
2024	Challengers	Austin Film Critics Association	Best Original Score	Nominated	
