= Lambhouse: The Collection 1991–1998 =

Compilation album by Unsane
- Released: October 21, 2003
- Genre: Noise rock
- Label: Relapse

Unsane chronology
Occupational Hazard (1998)	Lambhouse: The Collection 1991–1998 (2003)	Blood Run (2005)

Lambhouse: The Collection 1991–1998 is Unsane's second compilation album, released in 2003 through Relapse Records. It is a CD/DVD greatest hits compilation and collection of live and promotional videos by the band.

== Reception ==
Professional ratings
Review scores
Source	Rating
Allmusic	4.5/5 stars

Eduardo Rivadavia from Allmusic said about the album: "Over the course of 24 devastating tracks drawn from each of the band's landmark albums, one is sucked right into Unsane's despairing world of pain [...] The DVD portion of this set is perhaps even more impressive, as it offers another 23 clips culled from Unsane's decade-plus run."

== Track listing ==
1. "Over Me"
2. "Committed"
3. "Wait to Lose"
4. "Sick"
5. "Hazmat"
6. "Lead"
7. "Empty Cartridge"
8. "Blew"
9. "Can't See"
10. "Out"
11. "Alleged"
12. "Scrape"
13. "Broke"
14. "Straight"
15. "Body Bomb"
16. "My Right"
17. "Streetsweeper"
18. "Urge to Kill"
19. "This Town"
20. "Vandal X"
21. "Bath"
22. "Organ Doctor"
23. "Craked Up"
24. "Exterminator"

=== DVD ===
Music videos

1. "Sick"
2. "Scrape"
3. "Alleged"
4. "Body Bomb"

Live in Brooklyn, NY - 2003 (Northsix)

1. "Sick"
2. "Over Me"
3. "Committed"
4. "Lead"
5. "Wait to Lose"
6. "Can't See"
7. "Scrape"
8. "Alleged"
9. "Empty Cartridge"

Live in New York City, NY - 1996 (CBGB's)

1. "Straight"
2. "Blew"
3. "No Loss"
4. "Test My Faith"

Live in Albuquerque, NM - 1994 (Golden West)

1. "Trench"
2. "Maggot"

Live in Cincinnati, OH - 1992 (Sunday Malone's)

1. "Cut"
2. "Broke"
3. "H.L.L."
4. "Vandal-X"

== Credits ==
- Beth Blaszczyk – photography
- Teresa Gubbins – liner notes
- Scott Hull – mastering
- Orion Landau – design
- James Rexroad – photography
- Chris Spencer – photography
