= Blood Run (album) =

Studio album by Unsane
- Released: April 26, 2005
- Studio: Studio G (Brooklyn, New York)
- Genre: Noise rock, post-hardcore, alternative metal
- Length: 43:43
- Label: Relapse
- Producer: Joel Hamilton, Unsane

Unsane chronology
Lambhouse: The Collection 1991–1998 (2003)	Blood Run (2005)	Visqueen (2007)

Blood Run is an album by Unsane. It was released on April 26, 2005, through Relapse Records. It was the first album released by the group after their reformation in 2003.

== Reception ==
Professional ratings
Review scores
Source	Rating
AllMusic	3.5/5 stars
Pitchfork	5/10
PopMatters	6/10

Eduardo Rivadavia from AllMusic called it "a frightening place where every word uttered is a ragged scream, guitars clang against drums like hammers upon anvils, and unnerving shards of melody echo from standout tracks like 'Backslide', 'Killing Time', and 'Latch'" and "an excellent and surprisingly seamless addition to the band's canon."

== Track listing ==
1. "Back Slide" – 4:11
2. "Release" – 2:35
3. "Killing Time" – 4:55
4. "Got It Down" – 3:42
5. "Make Them Prey" – 4:21
6. "Hammered Out" – 4:43
7. "D Train" – 2:19
8. "Anything" – 3:27
9. "Recovery" – 3:45
10. "Latch" – 2:42
11. "Dead Weight" – 7:03

== Credits ==
- Chris Spencer – guitar, vocals, photography
- Dave Curran – bass, vocals
- Vincent Signorelli – drums
- Alan Douches – mastering
- Joel Hamilton – guitar solo on "Latch", producer, engineer
- Orion Landau – design
- James Rexroad – photography
