= Unlabeled - The Demos =

EP by Leah Andreone
- Released: October 9, 2006
- Genre: Pop
- Length: 20:03

Leah Andreone chronology
Alchemy (1998)	Unlabeled - The Demos (2006)	Avalanche (2009)

Unlabeled - The Demos is an EP by the American singer/songwriter Leah Andreone, released in 2006 (see 2006 in music) and includes a cover of Beyoncé's song "Deja Vu".

== Track listing ==
All songs by Leah Andreone, except where noted

1. "Never Stop Trying"
2. "A Flaw in the Way You Love Me"
3. "Break Your Fall"
4. "I'm Here"
5. "Generals Die in Bed"
6. "Avalanche"
7. "Deja Vu"
