= Unsane (band) =

American noise rock band

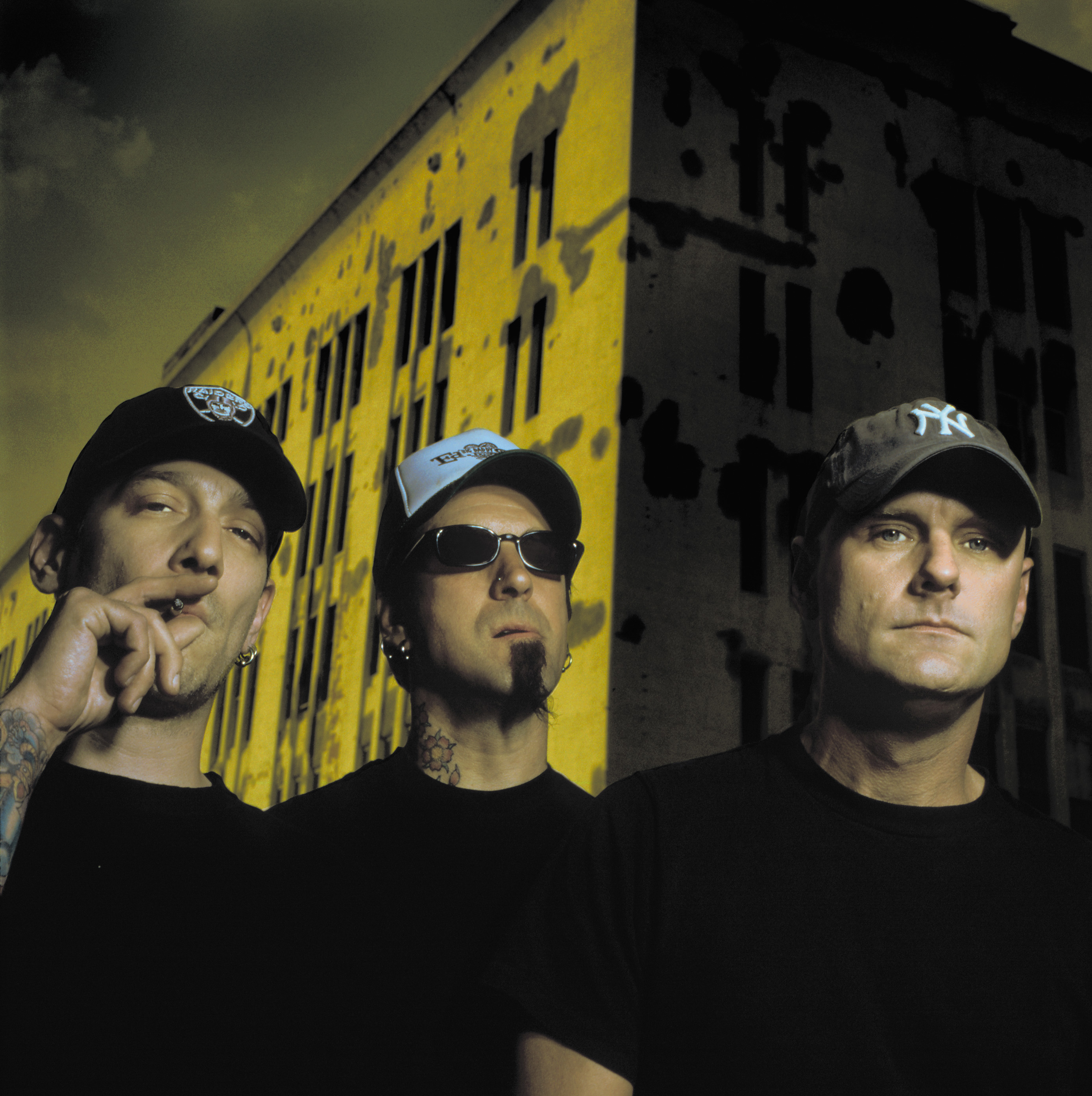
- Unsane in 2005

Background information
- Origin: New York City, U.S.
- Genres: Noise rock; post-hardcore
- Years active: 1988–2000, 2003–2019, 2021–present
- Labels: Matador, Amphetamine Reptile, Relapse, Ipecac, Alternative Tentacles, Southern Lord
- Members: Chris Spencer; Eric Cooper; Jon Syverson
- Past members: Dave Curran; Vincent Signorelli; Pete Shore; Anthony DeLuca; Charlie Ondras
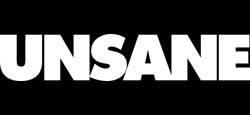

Unsane is an American noise rock trio that was formed in New York City in 1988. Its music touches on elements of hardcore punk and metal. The writer Patrick Kennedy wrote, "While developing the blueprint for noise-metal bands to follow, Unsane cut a remarkable swath through underground music, inspiring a devoted, cult-like following around the world."

== History ==
In 1988, singer/guitarist Chris Spencer, bass guitarist Pete Shore and drummer Charlie Ondras were students at Sarah Lawrence College when they formed Lawn-Chair-Blisters before changing the name to Unsane. The band signed to Circuit Records and recorded tracks with Wharton Tiers for what was supposed to be their first album, Improvised Munitions, but the label did not release it.

Unsane became part of the scene of loud, noisy, like-minded rock groups in New York City's East Village in the early 1990s. They often played gigs with bands like Pussy Galore, Cop Shoot Cop, Surgery, Helmet and the Reverb Motherfuckers. Members of Unsane also played in other bands such as Boss Hog and the Action Swingers.

The band's first album, Unsane, was released in 1991, and was known for its harsh music and gruesome cover art with a photo of a decapitated man on a New York subway track wearing a Members Only jacket. The band obtained this photograph from a friend who was working at the time with the police department, which was investigating the scene of the accident.

In 1992, Ondras died of a heroin overdose and was replaced by Vincent Signorelli (formerly of Foetus and Swans). In 1994, Shore left the band for unknown reasons and was replaced by Dave Curran.

The band toured heavily, and released Total Destruction in 1993 on Matador Records/Atlantic Records. Their third album, Scattered, Smothered & Covered, was issued by Amphetamine Reptile in 1995. The music video for the song "Scrape", made for a mere $200, had significant play on MTV. The video alternates between lo-fi rehearsal footage of Unsane and a series of serious skateboarding wipeouts.

The band continued touring heavily (including a spell opening for Slayer). Their next album, Occupational Hazard, was released by Relapse Records in 1998. Later that same year, Spencer was attacked by four people after playing a concert in Vienna, Austria. He was hospitalized with internal bleeding and underwent major surgery. As a result of his injury, and having toured over ten months of the year, the band decided to take a long break in 2000.

Unsane regrouped in 2003 and released the CD/DVD compilation Lambhouse: The Collection 1991–1998 the same year. This was followed by their fifth album, Blood Run, in 2005. Ipecac released the band's sixth studio album, Visqueen, in 2007.

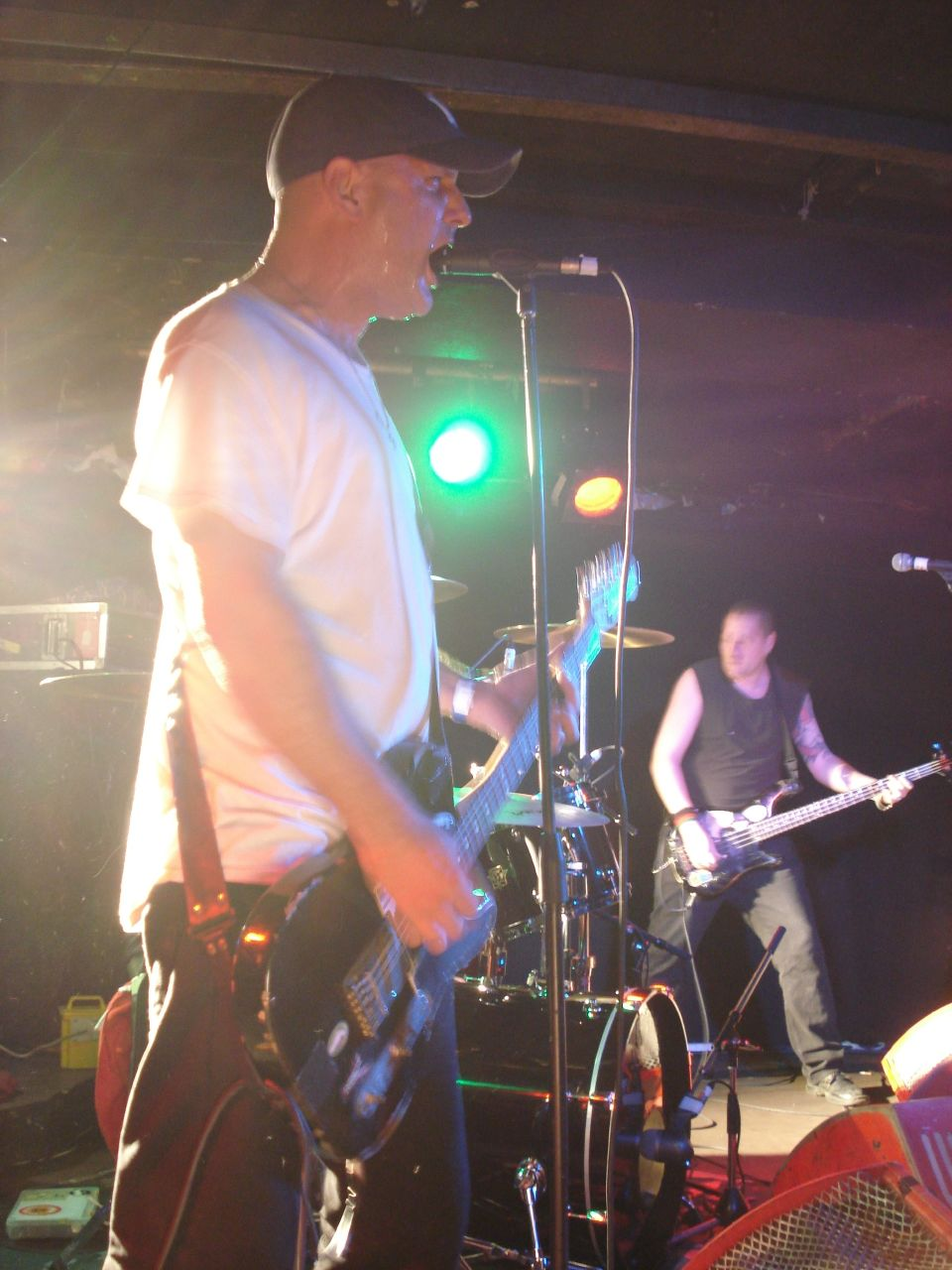
Unsane performing in 2007

Their song "Committed" was used in the Activision/Neversoft video game Tony Hawk's Pro Skater. Another Activision title, True Crime: New York City, uses the song "D Train".

Unsane released their seventh album, Wreck, on March 20, 2012, and toured with Melvins in April and May that year.

Unsane released their eighth studio album, Sterilize, on September 29, 2017.

In 2019, Spencer announced the formation of a new band, Human Impact, with ex-Swans members Phil Puleo and Chris Pravdica. Spencer subsequently announced his departure from Unsane in August 2019, first in an interview about Human Impact with the Italian-language music zine Equilibrio Precario, and then in English in a comment on a Facebook post of the same article.

In early 2021, Unsane released Improvised Munitions. It was originally envisioned as the band's debut album in 1989, but the band's former label shut down prior to its release. On August 27, 2021, Chris Spencer announced the formation of a new lineup of Unsane via the band's Instagram page, alongside new members Eric Cooper and Jon Syverson, with the specific focus on performing the band's early material.

== Activities outside the band ==
During the band's break between 2000 and 2003, Spencer moved to California, where he formed a new band with Curran called The Cutthroats 9 and released an album on Man's Ruin Records. Curran formed J.J. Paradise Players Club, and Signorelli opened a tattoo shop in Middle Village Queens.

Signorelli later formed A Storm of Light with Josh Graham (Neurosis, ex-Red Sparowes, Battle of Mice, Blood and Time) on guitar and vocals, Domenic Seita (ex-Tombs and Asea) on bass guitar, and Pete Angevine (Satanized) on additional drums and percussion. A Storm of Light spent most of the spring touring with Neurosis and they released their first album in 2008.

In 2008, Spencer formed the band Celan with Ari Benjamin Meyers (Redux Orchestra), Niko Wenner (Oxbow), Roeder and Xavi (both ex-flu-ID) and, in 2009, they released the well-reviewed album Halo on the Berlin label Exile on Mainstream Records and toured Europe. Spencer now plays in noise rock band Human Impact.

In 2015, Spencer formed UXO with Steve Austin of Today is the Day, Aarne Victorine, and Pat Kennedy. The band released its self-titled album in 2016 on Reptilian Records.

In 2019, Spencer formed Human Impact with ex-members of Swans and Cop Shoot Cop and confirmed his departure from Unsane.

== Members ==
Current members

- Chris Spencer – vocals, guitar (1988–2000, 2003–2019, 2021–present)
- Eric Cooper – bass (2021–present)
- Jon Syverson – drums (2021–present)

Former members

- Charlie Ondras – drums (1988–1992; died 1992)
- Pete Shore – bass (1988–1994)
- Anthony DeLuca – drums (1992)
- Vincent Signorelli – drums (1992–2000, 2003–2019)
- Dave Curran – bass (1994–2000, 2003–2019)

== Discography ==
=== Studio albums ===
- Unsane (Matador) – 1991
- Total Destruction (Matador/Atlantic) – 1993
- Scattered, Smothered & Covered (Amphetamine Reptile) – 1995
- Occupational Hazard (Relapse) – 1998
- Blood Run (Relapse) – 2005
- Visqueen (Ipecac) – 2007
- Wreck (Alternative Tentacles) – 2012
- Sterilize (Southern Lord) – 2017

=== Compilation albums ===
- Singles 89–92, LP/CD (Matador) – 1992
- Lambhouse: The Collection 1991–1998 (Relapse) – 2003
- Improvised Munitions & Demo (Lamb Unlimited) – 2021

=== Live albums ===
- Peel Sessions (Matador) – 1994
- Attack in Japan (Rebel) – 1995
- Amrep Xmas (Man's Ruin) – 1997

=== Singles ===
- "Scumbait #1" split with Cows, Pagans, Bastards (Unsane – "Burn") (Treehouse) – 1989
- "This Town" single (Treehouse) – 1989
- "Concrete Bed" single (Glitterhouse) – 1990
- "Vandal-X"/"Streetsweeper" single (Sub Pop) – 1990
- "Jungle Music" single (PCP) – 1991
- Split 7" with Slug (cover of Slug's "Breathe the Thing Out") (Matador) – 1992
- "Body Bomb" 7" red vinyl single (Matador) – 1994
- "Sick"/"No Soul" single (Man's Ruin) – 1996
- "Committed"/"Over Me" single (Galaxia) – 1998
- "This Plan"/"Ha, Ha, Ha" single (DC Records) – 2001
- "Fix It"/"Wrung" single for Bash 17 (Amphetamine Reptile Records) – July 2017

=== The Peel Sessions ===
The band recorded three sessions. The first two were released as an EP in 1994, while the third session remains unreleased.

- May 21, 1991
- November 26, 1992
- June 7, 1994
