= Die Warzau =

Chicago-based musical group

- Jim Marcus (left) and Van Christie in 1992

Background information
- Also known as: Die Warzau Synfony
- Origin: Chicago, Illinois, U.S.
- Genres: EBM; industrial
- Years active: 1987–2011, 2013, 2015
- Labels: Fiction; Atlantic; Mercury; Polygram; WaxTrax!; Pulseblack
- Spinoffs: Apartment 26; Dead on TV; The Dreaming; Eco-Hed; Everplastic; Go Fight; Oxygiene 23; Pigface
- Past members: Van Christie; Daniel Evans; Abel Garibaldi; Christopher Hall; Jim Marcus; Chris Vrenna; Barry Adelman; Xmas Smits; Vince McAley; James Woolley; Kevin Temple; Mars Williams
- Website: diewarzau.com

Die Warzau (originally Die Warsaw Synfony) was an American industrial music band formed in 1987 by Jim Marcus and Van Christie.

== History ==
In the late 80s, Jim Marcus and Van Christie were working individually as performance artists. Christie had also been playing music with a band but found that he wanted to work with another musician that was into performance art, which led to collaboration with Marcus. The duo originally took the name "Die Warzau Synfony" as a reference to an orchestra composed of dissidents and Jews that played in Warsaw, Poland early in World War Two until, as the band put it, they were "censored to death." After releasing their first 12", "I've Got to Make Sense", the band dropped "Synfony" to become simply Die Warzau.

Originally signed to Chris Parry's Fiction Records, the pair released their first album Disco Rigido in 1989. Singles from the album made the Billboard dance charts, with "Welcome to America" spending six weeks on the charts and peaking at No. 31, while "Strike To The Body/Jackhammer" peaked at No. 33.

The band's early success attracted the attention of Val Azzoli at Atlantic Records who signed the band in 1991 as part of a move by the label toward industrial rock. Their second album, Big Electric Metal Bass Face, was released in October that year. Contributors to the band at the time included Chris Vrenna and James Woolley (both members of Nine Inch Nails during the mid-1990s), and audio visual artist Burle Avant, who went on to co-create the MTV television series Amp. Singles from the album made the Billboard dance charts, with "Funkopolis" spending 10 weeks on the charts, peaking at No. 8, and "Never Again" peaking at No. 23. Die Warzau supported Nine Inch Nails on tour the same year.

Warzone Records was started by Van Christie and Jim Marcus in 1994 as part of Cabrini Green Housing Projects.

Engine, a 1995 release on Fiction/Wax Trax! and distributed by TVT, was the last album the group released before going on hiatus for almost a decade. Engine featured a much expanded list of contributors, including saxophonist Mars Williams, guitarist Louis Svitek, the Swans rhythm section of bassist Algis Kizys and Vinnie Signorelli, and Chris Randall of the band Sister Machine Gun (SMG). One of the songs written by Die Warzau during this time, "Hole in the Ground", was featured on the SMG album Burn. Engine spent nine weeks on the CMJ Radio Top 150, peaking at No. 78.

Despite a positive reception for Engine, the band's relationship with TVT went cold and left the members feeling cynical about record labels in general. After 1995, Die Warzau as a group went on hiatus for a number of years with Marcus and Christie working on other projects. Jim Marcus founded the pure funk group Everplastic, while Van Christie worked on another project called Eco-Hed.

In 2002, Christie and Marcus reunited to record vocals for Christie's Eco-Hed project which — along with certain changes to the music industry landscape at the time — led the duo to reviving Die Warzau. Together with new members Abel Garibaldi and Dan Evans they released Convenience on their Chicago-based label Pulseblack Records in 2004. The band played their first live show in over a decade in Chicago in January 2005. Convenience won the Just Plain Folks Industrial Album of the Year in 2006.

2008 saw the release of Vinyl88, a collection of remixes and previously unreleased tracks including "Born Again" (for which a video was released) and "Hitler's Brain", a collaboration with funk pioneer George Clinton. While some of the tracks had seen prior release, many of the remixes featured re-recorded elements.

In 2009, Die Warzau made several songs – many from the recent Convenience and Vinyl 88 releases – available for remixing at RemixGalaxy.com The different musical elements (vocals, drums, bass, etc.) of each song are available as separate tracks, which allows users the opportunity to create their own versions of the songs or incorporate the parts into their own original tracks under personal, non-commercial license.

In 2011, Die Warzau announced on their Facebook page that their performance at the WTII Minifest 2 on June 12 would be the band's last performance before breaking up. The live personnel included Jim Marcus, Dan Evans, Vince McAley, and Jay Ramirez.

The band reunited to play one show at the "Cold Waves II" festival held in Chicago in late September 2013 and in 2015 played their final show with Pop Will Eat Itself in New York City.

== Discography ==
Studio albums

- Disco Rigido (1989, Polygram/Fiction)
- Big Electric Metal Bass Face (1991, Atlantic/Fiction)
- Engine (1995, Wax Trax/TVT Records)
- Convenience (2004, Pulseblack)

Compilation albums

- Vinyl88 (2008, Rosehip/Pulseblack)

EPs and Singles

- I've Got to Make Sense (1988, Desire, White Label, as Die Warzau Synfony)
- Land of the Free (1989, Fiction)
- Welcome to America (1989, Polygram/Fiction)
- Bodybag / Shakedown (1990, Polygram/Fiction)
- Strike to the Body (1990, Polygram/Fiction)
- Funkopolis (1991, Atlantic/Fiction)
- Burning (1991, Atlantic, Promo Only)
- Jesus Killer (EP) (1991, Non Fiction Records)
- Never Again (1992, Atlantic/Fiction)
- Liberated (1994, Wax Trax/TVT Records)
- All Good Girls (1995, Wax Trax/TVT Records)
- Insect (2004, Pulseblack)
- Borghild (2009, Pulseblack)
- Dry (featuring Emilie Autumn) (2009, Pulseblack)
- Play / Dry (2016, Pulseblack)
