= Chris Spencer (musician) =

American vocalist and guitarist

- Born: Durham, North Carolina, U.S.
- Genres: Noise rock, post-hardcore
- Occupation: Musician
- Instruments: Guitar, vocals

Chris Spencer is the vocalist and guitarist of the noise rock band Unsane, based in New York City. He also was vocalist and guitarist of the band The Cutthroats 9, when he moved to California after Unsane went on hiatus in 2000. He recently formed the sludge metal band Celan, along with composer/keyboardist Ari Benjamin Meyers.
