= Vincent Signorelli =

American drummer

- Genres: Experimental rock; post-punk; noise rock; experimental
- Occupation: Musician
- Instrument(s): Drums, percussion
- Years active: 1984–present
- Labels: Relapse, Young God

Vincent Signorelli is a drummer from New York City. He has played primarily with Swans, Unsane, and Foetus. Additionally, he has done session work with Lubricated Goat, Of Cabbages and Kings, and the slo-core band Idaho. Concurrent with his involvement in Unsane, Signorelli runs a tattoo shop in New York called True Blue located in Queens on Fresh Pond Road.

== Biography ==
Signorelli's involvement with the New York punk scene began quite early, playing drums with the Dots. It is the Dots drum kit that was used during a recording session with the Bad Brains. In 1991, he joined Swans and played percussion on their album White Light from the Mouth of Infinity, with Anton Fier serving as the primary drummer. Signorelli took over as the main drummer for their next album titled Love of Life, released the following year. In 1993, Signorelli joined the American post-hardcore band Unsane, replacing original drummer Charlie Ondras who had died the previous year.

He has recently joined a band called A Storm of Light with Josh Graham (Neurosis, ex Red Sparowes, Battle of Mice, Blood and Time) on guitar and vocals, Domenic Seita (ex Tombs and Asea) on bass, and Pete Angevine (Satanized) on additional drums and percussion. They released their debut album in June 2008.

He made a guest appearance on 'MTV Downtown Julie Brown' playing drums for Londonbeat on the song "I've Been Thinking About You".
