= List of Nine Inch Nails band members =

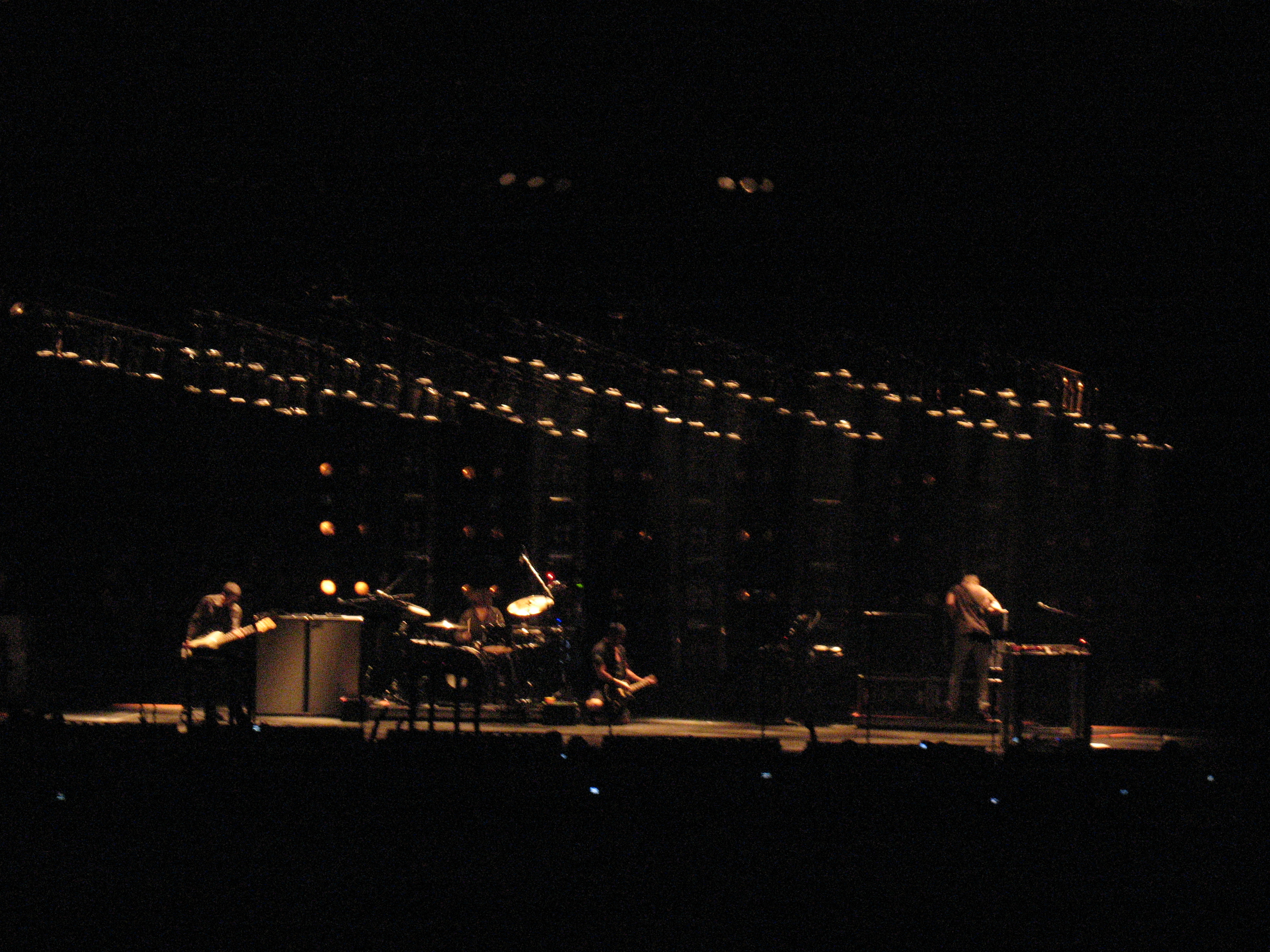
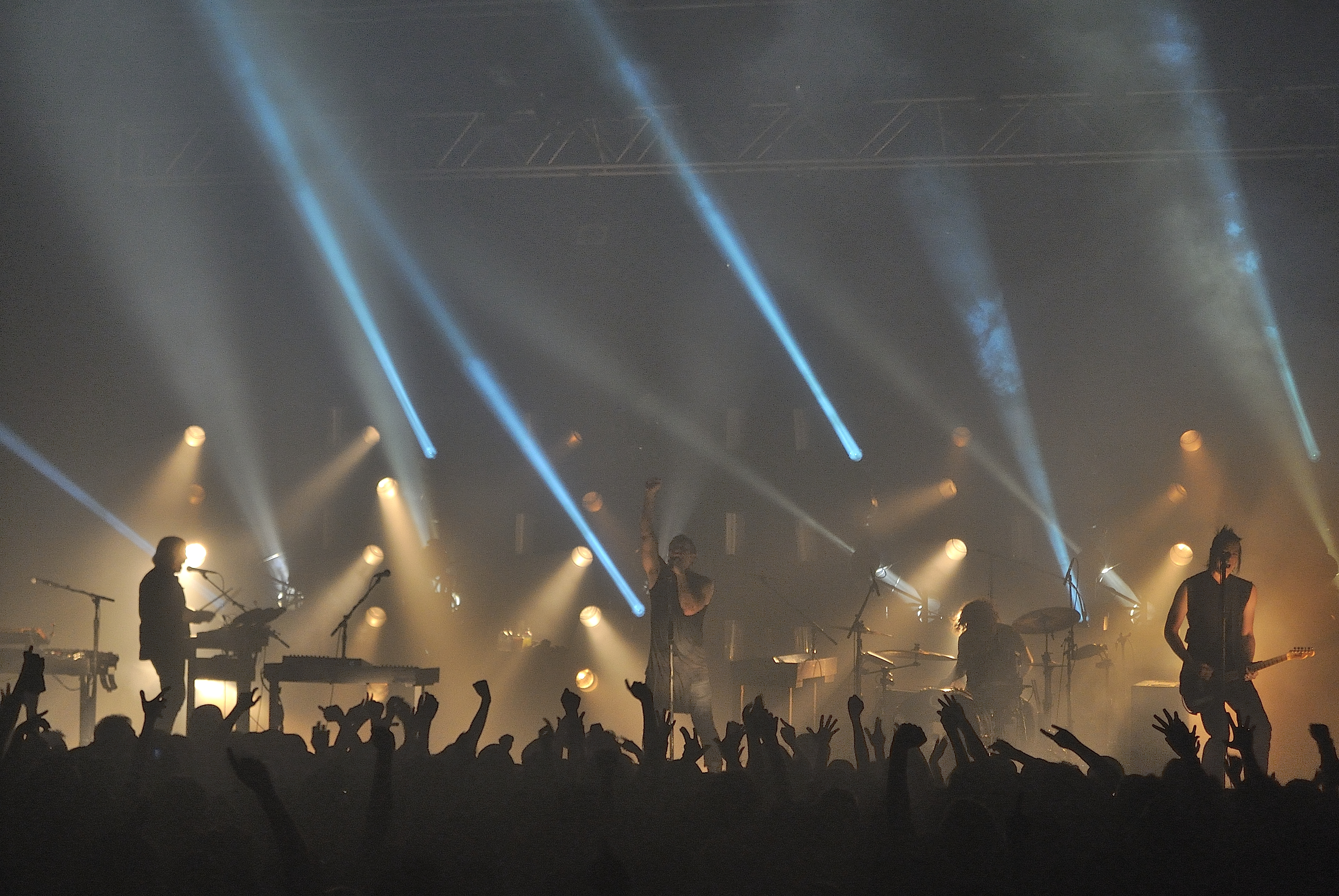

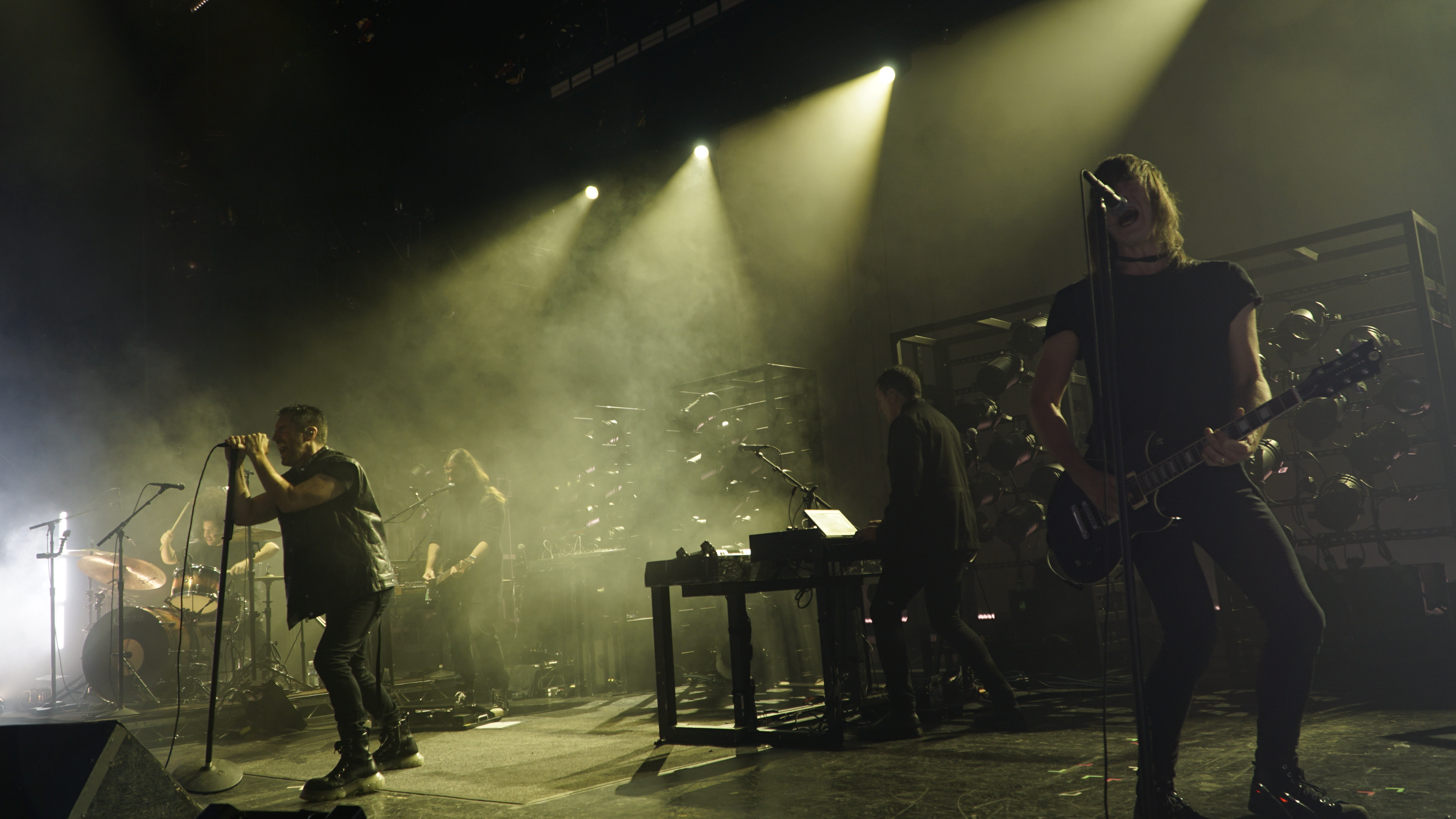
From left to right: Ilan Rubin, Trent Reznor, Alessandro Cortini, Atticus Ross, and Robin Finck.

Two line-ups of Nine Inch Nails performing in 2009, 2014 and 2022

Nine Inch Nails is an American industrial rock band founded in 1988 by Trent Reznor in Cleveland, Ohio. The band's live performances contrast with its in-studio counterpart; although Reznor is in complete creative control of Nine Inch Nails in-studio, he typically assembles groups of backing musicians to interpret songs for live performances. The current lineup features Reznor and keyboardist Atticus Ross (an official member since 2016 and session contributor since 2004), alongside touring members guitarist Robin Finck (who first joined in 1994), bassist Stu Brooks (who joined in 2026), and drummer Josh Freese (who first joined in 2005). Although band members typically have a defined main role, many of them are multi-instrumentalists during performances. (Note: For a member's release contributions, only official material released by Nine Inch Nails is included. Soundtracks and compilations are also included if the Nine Inch Nails track on the release was previously unreleased up to that point. Promotional releases are not included since they weren't intended to be obtained by the general public. For example, the live version of "Happiness in Slavery" which is found on the Woodstock 94 Live Album is listed under Robin Finck's name since he appeared on the track and that particular song was not released elsewhere up to that point.) (Note: Please note that, under a member's release contributions, the listings refers to the actual commercial single that was released, and not a particular song. For example, Chris Vrenna co-wrote and contributed to the song "The Perfect Drug" in 1997, but later in 2000, "The Perfect Drug" was included as a b-side to the commercial "Into the Void" single, well after Vrenna had departed from the band; thus, both instances are listed under his name.)

== History ==
Nine Inch Nails was founded by multi-instrumentalist Trent Reznor in 1988. The band's first tour was in support of Skinny Puppy that same year. The band's initial lineup included Reznor on vocals and guitar, Chris Vrenna on keyboards, programming, and percussion, and Ron Musarra on drums. These shows were not very well received and Nine Inch Nails departed after only a handful of dates. For the next tour, which started in late 1989, Musarra was replaced on drums by Vrenna, and the lineup was expanded with guitarist Richard Patrick and a new keyboardist. The first keyboardist was designer Gary Talpas, though he was soon replaced by Nick Rushe, and then by David Haymes in January 1990. Lee Mars replaced Haymes on keyboards later on in 1990.

Vrenna departed halfway through a tour in 1990, and he was replaced by Jeff Ward. For the 1991 Lollapalooza tour, the band was joined by James Woolley, replacing Mars on keyboards. Vrenna returned on drums in 1992. In 1994, for the Self Destruct Tour, Danny Lohner and Robin Finck replaced Patrick as new bassist and guitarist respectively (although both members handled other instruments as well). Charlie Clouser also replaced Woolley as keyboardist by December 1994. After Finck's departure in early 1996, Prick founder Kevin McMahon filled in as guitarist for a handful of dates in 1996. Vrenna departed the band at the end of 1996.

For nearly three years, the band was restricted to the studio, until 1999's Fragility Tour. At that point, Jerome Dillon joined as Vrenna's replacement on drums, alongside a returning Finck on guitar. Afterwards, Nine Inch Nails didn't play live until 2005 when they embarked on the Live: With Teeth Tour. The lineup featured Reznor and Dillon, in addition to new members Aaron North on guitar, Jeordie White on bass, and Alessandro Cortini on keyboards. During the band's first arena tour in the US, Dillon was forced to leave the band due to a medical condition, and he was briefly replaced by Josh Freese, and then by Alex Carapetis. Freese later returned as the band's permanent drummer in 2005. After the tour for the Year Zero album concluded in 2007, both White and North departed.

For the Lights in the Sky Tour in 2008, Finck rejoined the band on guitar, and Rich Fownes was announced for bass; however, Fownes was replaced by Justin Meldal-Johnsen before the tour began. Freese departed at the end of a North American tour in 2008, and he was replaced by multi-instrumentalist Ilan Rubin. Cortini also departed at the end of the 2008 tour, and his position was not replaced; thus, Nine Inch Nails performed as a four-piece ensemble for the first time since 1991. Following the conclusion of the tour in 2009, the band entered an extended hiatus.

Nine Inch Nails returned to a live setting in 2013, announcing a tour for 2013 with new members Eric Avery (bass), Adrian Belew (guitar), and Josh Eustis (keyboards/guitar). Rubin and Cortini also returned on drums and keyboards respectively. Before the tour commenced, both Avery and Belew departed due to various reasons. They were replaced by Eustis moving onto bass and the again-returning Finck on guitar. Later in 2013, the lineup was expanded to include bassist Pino Palladino and backing vocalists Lisa Fischer and Sharlotte Gibson. The eight-person live band represented the group's largest lineup since its formation.

The lineup dropped back to four members in 2014 with Reznor, Finck, Cortini, and Rubin embarking on a world tour. This lineup continued until studio collaborator Atticus Ross joined Reznor as an official member of the group in 2016. Due to Ross' inclusion as keyboardist, Cortini transitioned into primarily playing bass and guitar. The lineup of Reznor, Finck, Cortini, Rubin, and Ross remained unchanged from 2016 to 2025, making it the most stable configuration in the band's history.

In 2025, during the Peel It Back Tour, the band announced that Freese would be rejoining the band, following Rubin's decision to leave Nine Inch Nails and join the Foo Fighters (who had fired Freese the same year). Cortini departed from Nine Inch Nails in late 2025, and the following year, Stu Brooks joined as his replacement (primarily on bass) for the second leg of the Peel It Back Tour.

== Official members ==
Image	Name	Years active	Instruments	Release contributions
	Trent Reznor (Note: Official member of Nine Inch Nails in-studio since 1988, Reznor has performed with the live band since its inception in 1988 and he has been the only constant member of the live band.)	1988–present	vocals; guitar; keyboards; piano; synthesizers; programming; bass; drums; percussion; saxophone	all Nine Inch Nails releases
	Atticus Ross (Note: Atticus Ross was initially an in-studio collaborator with Nine Inch Nails, as he worked on nearly every project since 2005. He was also a founding member of Reznor's side-project How to Destroy Angels, and worked with Reznor on numerous soundtrack scores. In 2016, he was made an official member of Nine Inch Nails, the first person to receive that title (besides Reznor). Ross was included in Nine Inch Nails' Rock and Roll Hall of Fame inductees roster in 2020.)	2016–present (studio collaborator since 2004)	keyboards; synthesizers; programming; bass; backing vocals	all Nine Inch Nails releases since With Teeth (2005)

== Touring musicians ==
=== Current ===
Image	Name	Years active	Instruments	Release contributions
	Robin Finck (Note: Robin Finck replaced Richard Patrick, the live band's original guitarist, for the Self-Destruct Tour in 1994. Finck was then replaced by Kevin McMahon for a few shows in 1996. Between tours, Finck performed briefly with Cirque du Soleil and then with Guns N' Roses. Following a four-year touring hiatus, the Nine Inch Nails live band reformed in 1999 for the Fragility Tour, again featuring Finck contributing on guitar. At the conclusion of the Fragility Tour in 2000, Finck returned to Guns N' Roses, and was replaced by Aaron North for Live: With Teeth in 2005. There were various reports that suggested there was animosity between Finck and Reznor during the Fragility tours, which may have led to Finck declining the invitation to the following tours. In 2008, Finck rejoined Nine Inch Nails, playing on The Slip and joining the live band for the Lights in the Sky Tour and the following Wave Goodbye Tour. Finck has contributed on the most tours of all the past live members, playing for the Self-Destruct, Fragility, Lights in the Sky, Wave Goodbye, Twenty-Thirteen, I Can’t Seem to Wake Up, Cold and Black and Infinite, U.S. 2022 & U.K. 2022, and Peel It Back tours. Finck was included in Nine Inch Nails' Rock and Roll Hall of Fame inductees roster in 2020.)	1994–1996; 1999–2000; 2008–2009; 2013–present	guitar; keyboards; synthesizers; violin; mandolin; lap steel; percussion; backing and occasional lead vocals	Live-release contributions: Woodstock 94 Live Album (1994); Closure (1997); And All That Could Have Been (2002); Another Version of the Truth (2009); Live 2013 EP (2013); Studio-release contributions: "Closer to God" (1994); Further Down the Spiral (1995); Quake (1996); Still (2002); The Downward Spiral: DualDisc Edition (2004); "Discipline" (2008); The Slip (2008); The Slip: DVD Edition (2008); Nine Inch Noize (2026); Music video appearances: "March of the Pigs" (1994); "Burn" (1994); "Into the Void" (2000)
	Josh Freese (Note: Josh Freese had been a part of A Perfect Circle while they acted as the supporting band for Nine Inch Nails during the Fragility 2.0 Tour in 2000 and he also contributed to the side-project Tapeworm. During the Live: With Teeth Tour, drummer Jerome Dillon was forced to stop midway through a show and was subsequently hospitalized. One month later, Dillon was hospitalized a second time, and Freese initially replaced Dillon for two shows before Alex Carapetis joined the band for the remainder of the arena tour. Freese eventually replaced Carapetis and joined the band on a more permanent basis. Freese played with the band through the remainder of the Live: With Teeth Tour, the following Performance 2007 Tour, and the subsequent Lights in the Sky Tour. Between tours, Freese contributed instrumental performances to a number of Nine Inch Nails studio releases, including Year Zero and The Slip. He announced his departure from the band in late 2008 and was replaced by Ilan Rubin. In 2025, Freese rejoined the band, replacing Rubin (who simultaneously joined Foo Fighters, the band that Freese was also a member of until being let go earlier in the year). Although Freese was not included in Nine Inch Nails' Rock and Roll Hall of Fame inductees roster in 2020, Reznor specifically thanked him during his pre-recorded induction speech.)	2005; 2005–2008; 2025–present	drums; marimba	Live-release contributions: Beside You in Time (2007); Another Version of the Truth (2009); Studio-release contributions: Year Zero (2007); "Capital G" (2007); Year Zero Remixed (2007); Ghosts I–IV (2008); "Discipline" (2008); The Slip (2008); The Slip: DVD Edition (2008); Music video appearances: "Survivalism" (2007)
	Stu Brooks (Note: Long-time member Alessandro Cortini departed from Nine Inch Nails in 2025 after the first leg of the Peel It Back Tour. For the second leg of the tour in 2026, Stu Brooks was brought into the lineup. He primarily played bass, in addition to guitars and keyboards.)	2026–present	bass; guitar; keyboards; backing vocals	none

=== Former ===
Image	Name	Years active	Instruments	Release contributions
	Chris Vrenna (Note: Alongside Trent Reznor and Ron Musarra, Chris Vrenna was a member of the original three-piece band formed in 1988 to support Skinny Puppy on tour. He was initially the keyboardist and percussionist. After Nine Inch Nails was dismissed from the tour, Vrenna replaced Musarra on drums, and subsequently played with the band until 1990, when he had a brief fallout with Reznor. Vrenna and Reznor later reconciled, and Vrenna rejoined the band in 1992 for Broken and The Downward Spiral recording sessions and as a live member for the Self-Destruct Tour. After Vrenna contributed to the Lost Highway Soundtrack, the pair had a final falling out in 1996. In September 2022, Vrenna and former members Richard Patrick, Danny Lohner, and Charlie Clouser took part in a Q&A session alongside the other present members of Nine Inch Nails in Cleveland, Ohio (as it related to the band's Rock and Roll Hall of Fame induction in 2020). The following night during Nine Inch Nails' concert at Blossom Music Center, Vrenna, Patrick, Lohner, and Clouser reunited with the band for the final six songs of the setlist. Vrenna was included in Nine Inch Nails' Rock and Roll Hall of Fame inductees roster in 2020.)	1988–1990; 1992–1996; 2022 (guest)	drums; percussion; keyboards; programming	Live-release contributions: Woodstock 94 Live Album (1994); Closure (1997); Studio-release contributions: Pretty Hate Machine (1989); Broken (1992); Fixed (1992); The Broken Movie (1993); The Downward Spiral (1994); The Crow Soundtrack (1994); "Closer to God" (1994); Natural Born Killers Soundtrack (1994); Further Down the Spiral (1995); Quake (1996); Lost Highway Soundtrack (1997); "The Perfect Drug" (1997); "We're in This Together" (1999); "Into the Void" (2000); The Downward Spiral: DualDisc Edition (2004); Halo I–IV (2015); Music video appearances: "Down in It" (1989); "Head Like a Hole" (1990); "Wish" (1992); "Gave Up" (1992); "March of the Pigs" (1994); "Burn" (1994); "The Perfect Drug" (1997)
	Ron Musarra (Note: Ron Musarra was the drummer of the 1980s band Slam Bamboo, which Reznor was also the keyboardist of. After leaving the band, Reznor and Musarra — along with Chris Vrenna — were members of the original three-piece Nine Inch Nails band formed in 1988 to support Skinny Puppy on tour. Rehearsal audio from a few days before this tour was later released in the 1990s as the bootleg album Purest Feeling. Nine Inch Nails were reportedly poorly received, however, and were asked to leave the tour after 10 dates. A brief video from this performance would be released as bonus footage on 1997's Closure. Musarra assisted Reznor in the studio on drums during the band's earliest recording sessions. For subsequent live performances and tours, original keyboardist Vrenna replaced Musarra on drums. Musarra was thanked in the liner notes of Pretty Hate Machine, possibly due to his involvement in the album's demos.)	1988	drums	Closure (1997)
	Richard Patrick (Note: Following Nine Inch Nails' first performances in support of Skinny Puppy, the band expanded from a three-piece to a four-piece band as Richard Patrick was added on guitar. Patrick played with the band through the conclusion of the Pretty Hate Machine Tour in 1991, including a performance at Lollapalooza. After touring briefly in Europe, Nine Inch Nails then worked on the Broken EP; however, Patrick was not allowed by Reznor to contribute towards the material, although Patrick was thanked as an "influence" in the liner notes for Broken. After appearing in the music videos for Broken's tracks he left the live band to form Filter. He co-founded Filter along with Nine Inch Nails' in-studio engineer Brian Liesegang. Patrick was briefly reunited with Nine Inch Nails in 1996 during the Nights of Nothing showcase tour, as he contributed guitar to a performance of "Head Like a Hole" during Nine Inch Nails' set on the last of three dates. Although Patrick was not included in Nine Inch Nails' Rock and Roll Hall of Fame inductees roster in 2020, Reznor specifically thanked him during his pre-recorded induction speech. In September 2022, Patrick and former members Chris Vrenna, Danny Lohner, and Charlie Clouser took part in a Q&A session alongside the other present members of Nine Inch Nails in Cleveland, Ohio (as it related to the band's Rock and Roll Hall of Fame induction in 2020). The following night during Nine Inch Nails' concert at Blossom Music Center, Patrick, Vrenna, Lohner, and Clouser reunited with the band for the final six songs of the setlist. Filter's popular single "Hey Man, Nice Shot" was also performed for the first time by Nine Inch Nails, with Patrick on lead vocals.)	1989–1993; 1996 (guest); 2022 (guest)	guitar; backing vocals	Release contributions: Pretty Hate Machine (1989); The Broken Movie (1993); Closure (1997); Halo I–IV (2015); Music video appearances: "Down in It" (1989); "Head Like a Hole" (1990); "Wish" (1992); "Gave Up" (1992)
	Gary Talpas (Note: Gary Talpas briefly replaced Chris Vrenna on keyboards, so that Vrenna could move to drums. He was only present during the early portions of the promotional tour for Pretty Hate Machine. It is unknown whether he was actually playing; however, Talpas was Nine Inch Nails' art director for a number of years, including creating the widely known "NIN" logo. He was the art director for the Pretty Hate Machine, Broken, and The Downward Spiral eras.)	1989	keyboards	none
	Nick Rushe (Note: Following the live band's first performances in support of Skinny Puppy, Nine Inch Nails played a few promotional dates in late 1989 to support the release of Pretty Hate Machine. Since keyboardist Gary Talpas wasn't meant to be a full-time member, Nick Rushe was added to the live band on keyboards instead. Rushe was only part of the live band for a handful of dates in December 1989, although in that time span, Nine Inch Nails made their first televised appearance (on Dance Party USA in which a short clip was later included on the Closure documentary). After Rushe's firing, he subsequently joined Exotic Birds as their keyboardist, a band that both Reznor and Chris Vrenna were members of in the 1980s.)	1989	keyboards	Closure (1997)
	David Haymes (Note: For Nine Inch Nails' tours in support of The Jesus and Mary Chain and Peter Murphy in 1990, the band hired David Haymes to play keyboards. He was eventually replaced by Lee Mars for the Hate Tour.)	1990	keyboards	none
	Lee Mars (Note: Lee Mars contributed briefly to the live band as their keyboardist, replacing David Haymes. Mars performed with Nine Inch Nails for less than a year, but in that time played with the band during their first tours as a headlining act. Mars stayed with the band until early 1991 when James Woolley was brought in.)	1990–1991	keyboards	none
	Jeff Ward (Note: Jeff Ward briefly replaced Chris Vrenna as drummer for Nine Inch Nails when Vrenna left the band mid-tour due to a fallout with Reznor. Ward's brief tenure with the band included their 1991 Lollapalooza appearances and a short tour in Europe. In 1992, when Nine Inch Nails commenced work on the Broken EP, Vrenna was invited back into the band; however, Ward was thanked in the liner notes of Broken as an "influence". Afterwards, Ward co-created the band Low Pop Suicide as their drummer and songwriter. After the release of their debut album, he committed suicide in 1993. His death was mentioned in the liner notes of 1994's The Downward Spiral. Although Ward was not included in Nine Inch Nails' Rock and Roll Hall of Fame inductees roster in 2020, Reznor specifically thanked him during his pre-recorded induction speech.)	1990–1991 (died 1993)	drums	Closure (1997)
	James Woolley (Note: James Woolley replaced Lee Mars on keyboards in 1991, as Woolley was previously a member of Die Warzau, a band that toured alongside Nine Inch Nails in 1990 and early 1991. Woolley's tenure with the band started with the 1991 Lollapalooza tour and the subsequent tour in Europe. He was then thanked in the liner notes of 1992's Broken as an "influence" and he then returned for the Self-Destruct Tour, which also included Nine Inch Nails headlining at Woodstock '94. Woolley left the band in December 1994, although three years later he joined the live incarnation of 2wo (who were signed to Reznor's Nothing Records label at the time). Woolley died in 2016 due to a traumatic fall. Although Woolley was not included in Nine Inch Nails' Rock and Roll Hall of Fame inductees roster in 2020, Reznor specifically thanked him during his pre-recorded induction speech.)	1991–1994 (died 2016)	keyboards; synthesizers; programming; backing vocals	Live-release contributions: Woodstock 94 Live Album (1994); Closure (1997); Studio-release contributions: The Broken Movie (1993); "Closer to God" (1994); The Downward Spiral: DualDisc Edition (2004); Music video appearances: "Wish" (1992); "March of the Pigs" (1994); "Burn" (1994)
	Danny Lohner (Note: For the Self-Destruct Tour in 1994, the Nine Inch Nails live band was expanded into a five-piece band, adding Danny Lohner on bass, who previously played in the industrial metal band Skrew and then contributed to The Downward Spiral. Lohner played with the live band through the Self-Destruct Tour in 1994 and 1995 and the Fragility Tour in 1999 and 2000. During his tenure with the band, Lohner contributed to a number of releases, including studio albums The Downward Spiral and The Fragile. Lohner was also a founding member of the Nine Inch Nails side-project Tapeworm. He would appear as a guest during 2009's Wave Goodbye Tour, at the second-to-last show of the tour. In September 2022, Lohner and former members Chris Vrenna, Richard Patrick, and Charlie Clouser took part in a Q&A session alongside the other present members of Nine Inch Nails in Cleveland, Ohio (as it related to the band's Rock and Roll Hall of Fame induction in 2020). The following night during Nine Inch Nails' concert at Blossom Music Center, Lohner, Vrenna, Patrick, and Clouser reunited with the band for the final six songs of the setlist. Lohner was included in Nine Inch Nails' Rock and Roll Hall of Fame inductees roster in 2020.)	1993–2003; 2009 (guest); 2022 (guest)	bass; guitar; keyboards; synthesizers; backing vocals	Live-release contributions: Woodstock 94 Live Album (1994); Closure (1997); And All That Could Have Been (2002); Studio-release contributions: "March of the Pigs" (1994); The Downward Spiral (1994); "Closer to God" (1994); Further Down the Spiral (1995); Quake (1996); Lost Highway Soundtrack (1997); "The Perfect Drug" (1997); The Fragile (1999); "We're in This Together" (1999); "Into the Void" (2000); Things Falling Apart (2000); Still (2002); The Downward Spiral: DualDisc Edition (2004); Music video appearances: "March of the Pigs" (1994); "Burn" (1994); "The Perfect Drug" (1997); "Into the Void" (2000)
	Charlie Clouser (Note: In 1994, Charlie Clouser was Nine Inch Nails' keyboard technician for live performances. He joined the live band in December 1994, replacing James Woolley on keyboards midway though the Self-Destruct Tour. Clouser played with the live band through the remainder of the Self-Destruct Tour, and the subsequent Fragility Tour in 1999 and 2000. Clouser contributed to numerous studio releases, including The Downward Spiral and The Fragile. Clouser was also a founding member of the Nine Inch Nails side-project Tapeworm. Although Clouser was not included in Nine Inch Nails' Rock and Roll Hall of Fame inductees roster in 2020, Reznor specifically thanked him during his pre-recorded induction speech. In September 2022, Clouser and former members Chris Vrenna, Richard Patrick, and Danny Lohner took part in a Q&A session alongside the other present members of Nine Inch Nails in Cleveland, Ohio (as it related to the band's Rock and Roll Hall of Fame induction in 2020). The following night during Nine Inch Nails' concert at Blossom Music Center, Clouser, Vrenna, Patrick, and Lohner reunited with the band for the final six songs of the setlist.)	1994–2001; 2022 (guest)	keyboards; synthesizers; theremin; percussion; programming; backing vocals	Live-release contributions: Closure (1997); And All That Could Have Been (2002); Studio-release contributions: The Downward Spiral (1994); Natural Born Killers Soundtrack (1994); Further Down the Spiral (1995); Quake (1996); Lost Highway Soundtrack (1997); "The Perfect Drug" (1997); "The Day the World Went Away" (1999); The Fragile (1999); "We're in This Together" (1999); "Into the Void" (2000); Things Falling Apart (2000); The Downward Spiral: DualDisc Edition (2004); Music video appearances: "The Perfect Drug" (1997); "Into the Void" (2000)
	Kevin McMahon (Note: Kevin McMahon filled in for Robin Finck on the Nights of Nothing showcase tour as Nine Inch Nails' guitarist. Reznor had a long-standing friendship with McMahon, as they were bandmates in the late 1980s act Lucky Pierre and Reznor also signed McMahon's band Prick to Nothing Records, and subsequently Reznor produced Prick's self-titled debut album. In addition to playing guitar, McMahon also sang lead vocals on the Prick songs that Nine Inch Nails performed on the short tour.)	1996	guitar; vocals	none
	Jerome Dillon (Note: To replace long-time member Chris Vrenna for the Fragility Tour in 1999, Reznor held open auditions to find a new drummer, eventually picking then-unknown Jerome Dillon. Dillon performed with the live band through the entirety of the Fragility Tour and also contributed to the side-project Tapeworm. When Nine Inch Nails came out of a hiatus for the 2005 Live: With Teeth Tour, Dillon was the only live band member that remained from the Fragility Tour (besides Reznor himself). After Nine Inch Nails completed a small club tour and an overseas international tour, they returned to the United States in September 2005; however, during the band's first arena date, Dillon was forced to stop midway through a show and was subsequently hospitalized. His condition was later diagnosed as a non-life threatening cardiac disorder, a consequence of his thyroid medication. Dillon was then hospitalized a second time one month later, and thus he was replaced by Josh Freese. After a handful of dates, Alex Carapetis took over drumming duties for two months, followed by Freese again on a more permanent basis. During Dillon's tenure, he contributed to several Nine Inch Nails releases, including studio albums The Fragile and With Teeth, and live releases And All That Could Have Been and Beside You in Time, the latter of which was released after his split with the band. Although Dillon was not included in Nine Inch Nails' Rock and Roll Hall of Fame inductees roster in 2020, Reznor specifically thanked him during his pre-recorded induction speech.)	1999–2005	drums; guitar	Live-release contributions: And All That Could Have Been (2002); Beside You in Time (2007); Studio-release contributions: The Fragile (1999); "We're in This Together" (1999); "Into the Void" (2000); Things Falling Apart (2000); Still (2002); "The Hand That Feeds" (2005); With Teeth (2005); "Only" (2005); "Every Day Is Exactly the Same" (2006); Music video appearances: "Into the Void" (2000); "The Hand That Feeds" (2005)
	Alessandro Cortini (Note: Prior to the Live: With Teeth Tour in 2005, Reznor held open auditions to replace live band members who had left the group during the five years between tours. Alessandro Cortini reportedly fit in immediately, and was part of the live band for four years. Between tours, Cortini contributed to some of the Nine Inch Nails studio-material, gaining co-writing credits on Ghosts I–IV and a performance credit on The Slip. At the conclusion of the Lights in the Sky Over North/South America Tour in late 2008 Cortini announced his departure from the band to pursue other music projects. No replacement was hired for him, and the 2009 incarnation of the live band was a four-piece group, with the role of keyboard player shared between the four band members. Cortini returned to the live band for its 2013 and 2014 tours. Beginning with the I Can’t Seem to Wake Up Tour, Cortini transitioned to playing more guitar and bass, due to the addition of Atticus Ross on keyboards and synthesizers. Cortini departed from Nine Inch Nails in late 2025, prior to the second leg of the Peel It Back Tour. Cortini was included in Nine Inch Nails' Rock and Roll Hall of Fame inductees roster in 2020.)	2005–2008; 2013–2025	bass; keyboards; synthesizers; guitar; percussion; backing vocals	Live-release contributions: Beside You in Time (2007); Another Version of the Truth (2009); Live 2013 EP (2013); Studio-release contributions: "Only" (2005); "Every Day Is Exactly the Same" (2006); Year Zero Remixed (2007); Ghosts I–IV (2008); "Discipline" (2008); The Slip (2008); The Slip: DVD Edition (2008); Hesitation Marks (2013); "Came Back Haunted" (2013); Music video appearances: "The Hand That Feeds" (2005); "Survivalism" (2007)
	Jeordie White (Note: Jeordie White had been a part of Marilyn Manson (then playing under the pseudonym of "Twiggy Ramirez") while they acted as the supporting band for Nine Inch Nails during the Self-Destruct Tour in 1994. Prior to the Live: With Teeth Tour in 2005, Reznor held open auditions to replace live band members who had left the group during the five years between tours. White was auditioned and then chosen to replace Danny Lohner on bass. White played with the group through the Live: With Teeth Tour and the following Performance 2007 Tour. Although White was not included in Nine Inch Nails' Rock and Roll Hall of Fame inductees roster in 2020, Reznor specifically thanked him during his pre-recorded induction speech.)	2005–2007	bass; guitar; keyboards; synthesizers; backing vocals	Release contributions: "Only" (2005); "Every Day Is Exactly the Same" (2006); Beside You in Time (2007); Music video appearances: "The Hand That Feeds" (2005); "Survivalism" (2007)
	Aaron North (Note: Prior to the Live: With Teeth Tour in 2005, Reznor held open auditions to replace live band members who had left the group during the five years between tours. Reznor reportedly had trouble finding a guitarist to replace long-time guitarist Robin Finck until auditioning Aaron North. North played with the group through the Live: With Teeth Tour and the following Performance 2007 Tour. He was then replaced by Finck, who made a return to the band in 2008. Although North was not included in Nine Inch Nails' Rock and Roll Hall of Fame inductees roster in 2020, Reznor specifically thanked him during his pre-recorded induction speech.)	2005–2007	guitar; backing vocals	Release contributions: "Only" (2005); "Every Day Is Exactly the Same" (2006); Beside You in Time (2007); Music video appearances: "The Hand That Feeds" (2005); "Survivalism" (2007)
	Alex Carapetis (Note: During the Live: With Teeth Tour, drummer Jerome Dillon was forced to stop midway through a show and was subsequently hospitalized. After Dillon was hospitalized a second time one month later, Josh Freese initially replaced Dillon on drums for two shows before Alex Carapetis joined the band for the remainder of the arena tour. Due to Reznor not wanting to cancel anymore shows (since three were already postponed shortly beforehand), Carapetis rehearsed during soundchecks and breaks. After Nine Inch Nails finished a short tour of South America, Carapetis then declined to rejoin Nine Inch Nails for the subsequent dates. Freese eventually replaced Carapetis and joined the band on a more permanent basis.)	2005	drums	none
	Justin Meldal-Johnsen (Note: Prior to the Lights in the Sky Tour, it was originally announced that Rich Fownes would be joining the live band on bass; however, before any scheduled performances, it was revealed that Justin Meldal-Johnsen would instead be contributing on bass. He remained in the band for the entirety of the 2008 Lights in the Sky and 2009 Wave Goodbye tours. Although Meldal-Johnsen was not included in Nine Inch Nails' Rock and Roll Hall of Fame inductees roster in 2020, Reznor specifically thanked him during his pre-recorded induction speech.)	2008–2009	bass; guitar; keyboards; synthesizers; backing vocals	The Slip: DVD Edition (2008); Another Version of the Truth (2009)
	Ilan Rubin (Note: Ilan Rubin was named as the drummer to succeed Josh Freese. Rubin played with the band for the Wave Goodbye Tour, and was invited back into the band for the Twenty Thirteen Tour, remaining as the band's drummer until 2025 when he left to join the Foo Fighters. He was replaced by Freese (who was also a member of Foo Fighters until being let go earlier in the year). Rubin was included in Nine Inch Nails' Rock and Roll Hall of Fame inductees roster in 2020.)	2008–2009; 2013–2025	drums; programming; percussion; guitar; bass; keyboards; synthesizers; cello; ukulele; backing vocals	Live-release contributions: Live 2013 EP (2013); Studio-release contributions: Hesitation Marks (2013); "Came Back Haunted" (2013); "Copy of A" (2013); Remix 2014 EP (2014)
	Josh Eustis (Note: Josh Eustis joined the live band for its 2013 tours. He initially played bass, but after Pino Palladino joined the live band as the sole bassist, Eustis was moved to both keyboards and guitars, sharing duties with Alessandro Cortini and Robin Finck, respectively. After the Tension 2013 Tour, Eustis departed from the band and thus the lineup reverted to four members.)	2013	bass; guitar; keyboards; synthesizers; percussion; backing vocals	Things Falling Apart (2000); Hesitation Marks (2013); Live 2013 EP (2013)
	Pino Palladino (Note: After recording on Hesitation Marks, Pino Palladino joined the live band for the Tension 2013 Tour as the sole bassist. After the tour, Palladino departed from the band and thus the lineup reverted to four members.)	2013	bass	Hesitation Marks (2013); "Copy of A" (2013); Remix 2014 EP (2014)
	Lisa Fischer (Note: Lisa Fischer and Sharlotte Gibson joined the live band for the Tension 2013 Tour as vocalists. The duo was the first time that the Nine Inch Nails live band had consisted of members that focused solely on vocals and melodies. Fischer previously found success as a solo artist in the early 1990s, in addition to working with Tina Turner, The Rolling Stones, Aretha Franklin, among others.)	2013	backing vocals	none
	Sharlotte Gibson (Note: Sharlotte Gibson and Lisa Fischer joined the live band for the Tension 2013 Tour as vocalists. The duo was the first time that the Nine Inch Nails live band had consisted of members that focused solely on vocals and melodies. Gibson previously worked as a backing vocalist for solo artists such as Celine Dion and Mariah Carey. She later contributed backing vocals to 2017's Add Violence.)	2013	backing vocals	Add Violence (2017); "Less Than" (2017)

=== Unabridged list of members ===
Image	Name	Years active	Instruments	Release contributions
	Sean Beavan	1988–1996 (see notes) (Note: In 1988, Sean Beavan worked as a mixer for early demos of Pretty Hate Machine. He then went on to spend eight years working as Nine Inch Nails' live front-of-house mixer, where he would also provide backing vocals from behind the mixing console. At the same time, he continued to assist in the studio, working as a mixer and engineer on nearly every Nine Inch Nails release. In 1996, Beavan left to work as a front-of-house mixer for Marilyn Manson's Antichrist Superstar world tour.)	backing vocals	Pretty Hate Machine (1989); "Sin" (1990); Broken (1992); Fixed (1992); The Downward Spiral (1994); "Closer to God" (1994); Further Down the Spiral (1995); The Downward Spiral: DualDisc Edition (2004); Halo I–IV (2015)
	Martin Atkins	1991 (see notes) (Note: In 1989, Martin Atkins formed the industrial supergroup Pigface. Around the same time, he appeared in the music video for Nine Inch Nails' "Head Like a Hole", despite not playing on the track itself. Reznor was also an early collaborator in Pigface as he was involved with two songs on Pigface's 1991 debut album Gub. Shortly before Nine Inch Nails embarked on the 1991 Lollapalooza Tour, Reznor asked Atkins to join the band on drums; however, despite rehearsal sessions, Reznor decided that Atkins was not ready, and he instead kept Jeff Ward as the band's drummer for the tour. Atkins subsequently appeared on Broken, and also received a writing credit for the song "Suck", which originally appeared on Pigface's Gub.)	drums	Release contributions: Broken (1992); Fixed (1992); Closure (1997); Music video appearances: "Head Like a Hole" (1990)
	Keith Hillebrandt	1997–2002 (see notes); 2000 (live guest) (Note: Keith Hillebrandt assisted Nine Inch Nails in the studio for the Lost Highway Soundtrack in 1997. Afterwards, on David Bowie's 1997 single "I'm Afraid of Americans", Hillebrandt was credited along with Reznor, Charlie Clouser, Danny Lohner, and Dave Ogilvie as members of Nine Inch Nails. Reznor, Hillebrandt, and Ogilvie were again credited as Nine Inch Nails members for remixing Puff Daddy's 1998 single "Victory". For the then-upcoming Nine Inch Nails studio album The Fragile, the live band was envisioned as having multiple keyboardists, with Hillebrandt filling one of the roles; however, the album's direction eventually changed and Clouser instead remained as the live band's keyboardist. For a singular live radio session in April 2000 (dubbed The CRC Sessions), Hillebrandt filled in on keyboards for Clouser. The performance was an acoustically-driven stripped down set, which was an early indication of the 2002 release Still. Hillebrandt then continued to work alongside Reznor, such as on Nine Inch Nails' "Deep" single (2001) and on U2's "Vertigo" single (2004).)	keyboards; programming	Lost Highway Soundtrack (1997); "The Perfect Drug" (1997); The Fragile (1999); "We're in This Together" (1999); "Into the Void" (2000); Things Falling Apart (2000); Lara Croft: Tomb Raider Soundtrack (2001); And All That Could Have Been (2002); Still (2002)
	Dave Ogilvie	1997–1999 (see notes) (Note: Dave Ogilvie worked extensively in the studio with numerous bands prior to getting involved with Nine Inch Nails (most notably Nine Inch Nails' first ever touring mates Skinny Puppy). After contributing remixes during The Downward Spiral era, and also being involved in the studio for the 1997 Lost Highway Soundtrack, Ogilvie was credited along with Reznor, Charlie Clouser, Danny Lohner, and Keith Hillebrandt as members of Nine Inch Nails on David Bowie's 1997 single "I'm Afraid of Americans". Reznor, Hillebrandt, and Ogilvie were again credited as Nine Inch Nails members for remixing Puff Daddy's 1998 single "Victory". Although initial touring plans had Hillebrandt as an additional keyboardist, Ogilvie was not given a role; however, he continued to contribute in the studio. Ogilvie later had done mixing duties for Nine Inch Nails' two subsequent live albums, 2002's And All That Could Have Been and 2007's Beside You in Time.)	keyboards; programming	"March of the Pigs" (1994); "Closer to God" (1994); Further Down the Spiral (1995); Lost Highway Soundtrack (1997); "The Perfect Drug" (1997); The Fragile (1999); "We're in This Together" (1999); "Into the Void" (2000); Things Falling Apart (2000); And All That Could Have Been (2002); Still (2002); Beside You in Time (2007)
	Rich Fownes	2008 (see notes) (Note: The Nine Inch Nails official website originally announced in 2008 that Rich Fownes would be joining the live band for the Lights in the Sky Tour on bass. Before any scheduled performances, however, it was revealed that Justin Meldal-Johnsen would instead be contributing on bass. The circumstances of the replacement were not made public.)	bass	none
	Eric Avery	1991 (live guest); 2009 (live guest); 2013 (see notes) (Note: Eric Avery is the bassist of the band Jane's Addiction, and he guested live on-stage for Nine Inch Nails' song "Head Like a Hole" when the two bands toured together in 1991 for Lollapalooza. Avery was a guest again when the two bands toured together a second time in 2009 for the NIN|JA co-headlining tour. Afterwards, Avery was to join the Nine Inch Nails live band for their 2013 and 2014 tours. Before the tour began, however, he announced that he had quit the band.)	bass	none
	Adrian Belew	2013 (see notes) (Note: Former King Crimson guitarist and singer Adrian Belew contributed to numerous Nine Inch Nails releases in the studio since 1994. Belew was scheduled to tour with Nine Inch Nails through 2013 and 2014; however, before performing in any shows, it was announced due to personal conflicts that Belew would no longer participate in the tour.)	guitar; programming; percussion; backing vocals	The Downward Spiral (1994); Further Down the Spiral (1995); The Fragile (1999); Ghosts I–IV (2008); Hesitation Marks (2013); "Everything" (2013); Remix 2014 EP (2014)

== Line-ups ==
Period	Members	Studio Releases	Tour legs and live releases
October – December 1988	Trent Reznor – vocals, guitar; Chris Vrenna – keyboards, programming, percussion; Ron Musarra – drums		Pretty Hate Machine Tour Series (1988–1991)
January – September 1989	Trent Reznor – vocals, guitar; Chris Vrenna – drums, percussion; Richard Patrick – guitar, backing vocals		none – rehearsals and promos only
October 1989	Trent Reznor – vocals, guitar; Chris Vrenna – drums, percussion; Richard Patrick – guitar, backing vocals; Gary Talpas – keyboards	Pretty Hate Machine (1989) (with Vrenna on production and Talpas on sleeve design)	Pretty Hate Machine Tour Series (1988–1991)
November – December 1989	Trent Reznor – vocals, guitar; Chris Vrenna – drums, percussion; Richard Patrick – guitar, backing vocals; Nick Rushe – keyboards		Pretty Hate Machine Tour Series (1988–1991)
January – April 1990	Trent Reznor – vocals, guitar; Chris Vrenna – drums, percussion; Richard Patrick – guitar, backing vocals; David Haymes – keyboards		Pretty Hate Machine Tour Series (1988–1991)
May – August 1990	Trent Reznor – vocals, guitar; Chris Vrenna – drums, percussion; Richard Patrick – guitar, backing vocals; Lee Mars – keyboards		Pretty Hate Machine Tour Series (1988–1991)
August 1990 – February 1991	Trent Reznor – vocals, guitar; Richard Patrick – guitar, backing vocals; Lee Mars – keyboards; Jeff Ward – drums		Pretty Hate Machine Tour Series (1988–1991)
February – September 1991	Trent Reznor – vocals, guitar; Richard Patrick – guitar, backing vocals; Jeff Ward – drums; James Woolley – keyboards, synthesizers, programming, backing vocals		Pretty Hate Machine Tour Series (1988–1991)
September 1991 – February 1992	Trent Reznor – vocals, guitar; Richard Patrick – guitar, backing vocals; James Woolley – keyboards, synthesizers, programming, backing vocals		none – rehearsals and promos only
February 1992 – September 1993	Trent Reznor – vocals, guitar; Richard Patrick – guitar, backing vocals; James Woolley – keyboards, synthesizers, programming, backing vocals; Chris Vrenna – drums, percussion	Broken (1992) (Reznor and Vrenna only)	none – rehearsals and promos only
September – December 1993	Trent Reznor – vocals, guitar; James Woolley – keyboards, synthesizers, programming, backing vocals; Chris Vrenna – drums, percussion		none – rehearsals and promos only
December 1993 – March 1994	Trent Reznor – vocals, guitar; James Woolley – keyboards, synthesizers, programming, backing vocals; Chris Vrenna – drums, percussion; Danny Lohner – bass, guitar, keyboards, synthesizers, backing vocals		none – rehearsals and promos only
March – December 1994	Trent Reznor – vocals, guitar, keyboards, synthesizers; James Woolley – keyboards, synthesizers, programming, backing vocals; Chris Vrenna – drums, percussion; Danny Lohner – bass, guitar, keyboards, synthesizers, backing vocals; Robin Finck – guitar, keyboards, synthesizers, backing vocals	The Downward Spiral (1994) (without Woolley and Finck)	Self-Destruct (1994–1996) (also Closure (1997) live video)
December 1994 – July 1996	Trent Reznor – vocals, guitar, keyboards, synthesizers, bass; Chris Vrenna – drums, percussion; Danny Lohner – bass, guitar, keyboards, synthesizers, backing vocals; Robin Finck – guitar, keyboards, synthesizers, backing vocals; Charlie Clouser – keyboards, synthesizers, programming, backing vocals		Self-Destruct (1994–1996) (also Closure (1997) live video)
July – September 1996	Trent Reznor – vocals, guitar, keyboards, synthesizers, bass; Chris Vrenna – drums, percussion; Danny Lohner – bass, guitar, keyboards, synthesizers, backing vocals; Charlie Clouser – keyboards, synthesizers, programming, backing vocals; Kevin McMahon – guitar, backing vocals		Self-Destruct (1994–1996)
September 1996 – December 1996	Trent Reznor – vocals, guitar, keyboards, synthesizers, bass; Chris Vrenna – drums, percussion; Danny Lohner – bass, guitar, keyboards, synthesizers, backing vocals; Charlie Clouser – keyboards, synthesizers, programming, backing vocals		none – rehearsals and promos only
January 1997 – March 1999	Trent Reznor – vocals, guitar, keyboards, synthesizers, bass; Danny Lohner – bass, guitar, keyboards, synthesizers, backing vocals; Charlie Clouser – keyboards, synthesizers, programming, percussion, backing vocals		none – rehearsals and promos only
March 1999 – July 1999	Trent Reznor – vocals, guitar, keyboards, synthesizers, bass; Danny Lohner – bass, guitar, keyboards, synthesizers, backing vocals; Charlie Clouser – keyboards, synthesizers, programming, percussion, backing vocals; Jerome Dillon – drums, guitar		none – rehearsals and promos only
July 1999 – September 2000	Trent Reznor – vocals, guitar, keyboards, synthesizers, bass; Danny Lohner – bass, guitar, keyboards, synthesizers, backing vocals; Charlie Clouser – keyboards, synthesizers, programming, percussion, backing vocals; Jerome Dillon – drums, guitar; Robin Finck – guitar, keyboards, synthesizers, backing vocals	The Fragile (1999) (without Finck)	Fragility (1999–2000) (also And All That Could Have Been (2002) live album and video)
September 2000 – December 2001	Trent Reznor – vocals, guitar, keyboards, synthesizers, bass; Danny Lohner – bass, guitar, keyboards, synthesizers, backing vocals; Charlie Clouser – keyboards, synthesizers, programming, percussion, backing vocals; Jerome Dillon – drums, guitar		none – rehearsals and promos only
December 2001 – 2003	Trent Reznor – vocals, guitar, keyboards, synthesizers, bass; Danny Lohner – bass, guitar, keyboards, synthesizers, backing vocals; Jerome Dillon – drums, guitar		none – rehearsals and promos only
2003 – March 2005	Trent Reznor – vocals, guitar, keyboards, synthesizers, bass; Jerome Dillon – drums, guitar		none – rehearsals and promos only
March – October 2005	Trent Reznor – vocals, guitar, keyboards, synthesizers, bass, percussion; Jerome Dillon – drums, guitar; Aaron North – guitar, backing vocals; Jeordie White – bass, keyboards, synthesizers, guitar, backing vocals; Alessandro Cortini – keyboards, synthesizers, guitar, bass, backing vocals	With Teeth (2005) (Reznor and Dillon only)	Live: With Teeth (2005–2006) (also Beside You in Time (2007) live video)
October – December 2005	Trent Reznor – vocals, guitar, keyboards, synthesizers, percussion; Aaron North – guitar, backing vocals; Jeordie White – bass, keyboards, synthesizers, guitar, backing vocals; Alessandro Cortini – keyboards, synthesizers, guitar, bass, backing vocals; Alex Carapetis – drums		Live: With Teeth (2005–2006)
December 2005 – September 2007; (also briefly in October 2005)	Trent Reznor – vocals, guitar, keyboards, synthesizers, percussion; Aaron North – guitar, backing vocals; Jeordie White – bass, keyboards, synthesizers, guitar, backing vocals; Alessandro Cortini – keyboards, synthesizers, guitar, bass, backing vocals; Josh Freese – drums	Year Zero (2007) (Reznor and Freese only)	Live: With Teeth (2005–2006) (also Beside You in Time (2007) live video); Performance 2007 (2007)
September 2007 – January 2008	Trent Reznor – vocals, guitar, keyboards, synthesizers, percussion; Alessandro Cortini – keyboards, synthesizers, guitar, bass, backing vocals; Josh Freese – drums		none – rehearsals and promos only
January – June 2008	Trent Reznor – vocals, guitar, keyboards, synthesizers, percussion; Alessandro Cortini – bass, keyboards, synthesizers, guitar, backing vocals; Josh Freese – drums, percussion; Robin Finck – guitar, keyboards, synthesizers, percussion, backing vocals	Ghosts I–IV (2008) (without Finck); The Slip (2008)	none – rehearsals and promos only
June – December 2008	Trent Reznor – vocals, guitar, keyboards, synthesizers, percussion; Alessandro Cortini – keyboards, synthesizers, guitar, bass, backing vocals; Josh Freese – drums, percussion; Robin Finck – guitar, keyboards, synthesizers, percussion, backing vocals; Justin Meldal-Johnsen – bass, guitar, keyboards, synthesizers, backing vocals		Lights in the Sky (2008) (also Another Version of the Truth (2009) live video)
December 2008 – September 2009	Trent Reznor – vocals, guitar, keyboards, synthesizers, percussion; Robin Finck – guitar, keyboards, synthesizers, percussion, backing vocals; Justin Meldal-Johnsen – bass, guitar, keyboards, synthesizers, backing vocals; Ilan Rubin – drums, programming, percussion, keyboards, synthesizers, guitar, backing vocals		Wave Goodbye (2009)
September 2009 – March 2013	Trent Reznor – vocals, guitar, bass, keyboards, synthesizers, percussion	Hesitation Marks (2013) (without Finck)	none – rehearsals and promos only
March 2013 – September 2013	Trent Reznor – vocals, guitar, keyboards, synthesizers, percussion; Alessandro Cortini – keyboards, synthesizers, percussion, bass, guitar, backing vocals; Robin Finck – guitar, keyboards, synthesizers, percussion, backing vocals; Ilan Rubin – drums, programming, percussion, keyboards, synthesizers, bass, guitar, backing vocals; Josh Eustis – bass, guitar, keyboards, synthesizers, percussion, backing vocals	Hesitation Marks (2013) (without Finck)	Twenty Thirteen Tour (2013–2014) (also Live 2013 EP (2013) live album)
September – December 2013	Trent Reznor – vocals, guitar, keyboards, synthesizers, percussion; Alessandro Cortini – keyboards, synthesizers, percussion, guitar, backing vocals; Robin Finck – guitar, keyboards, synthesizers, percussion, backing vocals; Ilan Rubin – drums, programming, percussion, keyboards, synthesizers, guitar, backing vocals; Josh Eustis – guitar, keyboards, synthesizers, percussion, backing vocals; Pino Palladino – bass; Lisa Fischer – backing vocals; Sharlotte Gibson – backing vocals		Twenty Thirteen Tour (2013–2014)
December 2013 – October 2016	Trent Reznor – vocals, guitar, keyboards, synthesizers, percussion; Alessandro Cortini – bass, keyboards, synthesizers, percussion, guitar, backing vocals; Robin Finck – guitar, keyboards, synthesizers, percussion, backing vocals; Ilan Rubin – drums, programming, percussion, bass, keyboards, synthesizers, guitar, backing vocals		Twenty Thirteen Tour (2013–2014)
October 2016 – July 2025	Trent Reznor – vocals, guitar, keyboards, synthesizers, percussion; Alessandro Cortini – bass, guitar, keyboards, synthesizers, percussion, backing vocals; Robin Finck – guitar, keyboards, synthesizers, percussion, backing vocals; Ilan Rubin – drums, programming, percussion, guitar, bass, keyboards, synthesizers, backing vocals; Atticus Ross – keyboards, synthesizers, programming, bass, backing vocals	Not the Actual Events (2016) (Reznor and Ross only); Add Violence (2017) (Reznor and Ross only); Bad Witch (2018) (Reznor and Ross only); Ghosts V: Together (2020) (unknown personnel); Ghosts VI: Locusts (2020) (unknown personnel)	The Trilogy Tour (2017–2018); U.S. 2022 & U.K. 2022 (2022); Peel It Back Tour (2025)
July – September 2025	Trent Reznor – vocals, guitar, keyboards, synthesizers, percussion; Atticus Ross – keyboards, synthesizers, programming, backing vocals; Alessandro Cortini – bass, guitar, keyboards, synthesizers, percussion, backing vocals; Robin Finck – guitar, keyboards, synthesizers, percussion, backing vocals; Josh Freese – drums, percussion	Tron: Ares (2025) (Reznor and Ross only)	Peel It Back Tour (2025)
September 2025 – January 2026	Trent Reznor – vocals, guitar, keyboards, synthesizers, percussion; Atticus Ross – keyboards, synthesizers, programming, backing vocals; Robin Finck – guitar, keyboards, synthesizers, percussion, backing vocals; Josh Freese – drums, percussion		none – rehearsals and promos only
January 2026 – present	Trent Reznor – vocals, guitar, keyboards, synthesizers, percussion; Atticus Ross – keyboards, synthesizers, programming, backing vocals; Robin Finck – guitar, keyboards, synthesizers, percussion, backing vocals; Josh Freese – drums, percussion; Stu Brooks – bass, guitar, keyboards, backing vocals	Nine Inch Noize (2026) (unknown personnel)	Peel It Back Tour (2026)

== See also ==
- Nine Inch Nails live performances
- List of Nine Inch Nails tours
