= Twenty Thirteen Tour =

2013–2014 concert tour by Nine Inch Nails

- Tour by Nine Inch Nails
- Associated album: Hesitation Marks
- Start date: July 26, 2013
- End date: August 30, 2014
- Legs: 9
- No. of shows: 119
- Website: tour.nin.com

Nine Inch Nails concert chronology
- Wave Goodbye Tour (2009); Twenty Thirteen Tour (2013–14); The Trilogy Tour (2017–18)

The Twenty Thirteen Tour was a concert tour by industrial rock band Nine Inch Nails to support the album Hesitation Marks. It marked the return of the band for live performances after a four-year touring hiatus. It began on July 26, 2013, and ended on August 30, 2014.

== Background ==
In February 2009, Trent Reznor stated, "I've been thinking for some time now it's time to make NIN disappear for a while.", indicating the possible end of the act. Nine Inch Nails then embarked on a tour with Jane's Addiction, dubbed NIN|JA. Afterwards, Reznor clarified that the band is done with touring for the foreseeable future but he will continue to make music under the moniker. Nine Inch Nails' final live performance was September 10, 2009 at the Wiltern Theater in Los Angeles. Reznor also sold numerous performance gears, which include instruments, staging, amplifiers and effects units on eBay after the last concert. Since the final show, until the release of Hesitation Marks in 2013, Reznor released only two tracks as Nine Inch Nails: the theme song for the film, Tetsuo: The Bullet Man and a cover of "Zoo Station" by U2, for the tribute album AHK-toong BAY-bi Covered.

== Touring ==
In 2012, Reznor confirmed that he was working on new Nine Inch Nails material and might be performing live again. In February 2013, Reznor announced the return of Nine Inch Nails and revealed tour details. He also revealed that the new lineup of the band included Eric Avery of Jane's Addiction, Adrian Belew of King Crimson, and Joshua Eustis of Telefon Tel Aviv, as well as returning members Alessandro Cortini and Ilan Rubin. However, both Avery and Belew quit before the tour commenced, with former member Robin Finck returning in their place.

On February 23, 2013, it was announced that the band would perform at Fuji Rock Festival, Pukkelpop and Rock 'n' Heim Festival in Hockenheim, Germany in mid-2013. On March 11, 2013, it was announced that they would also play Reading and Leeds Festivals. The Tension 2013 leg of the tour had support from Godspeed You! Black Emperor and Explosions in the Sky.

== Line-ups ==
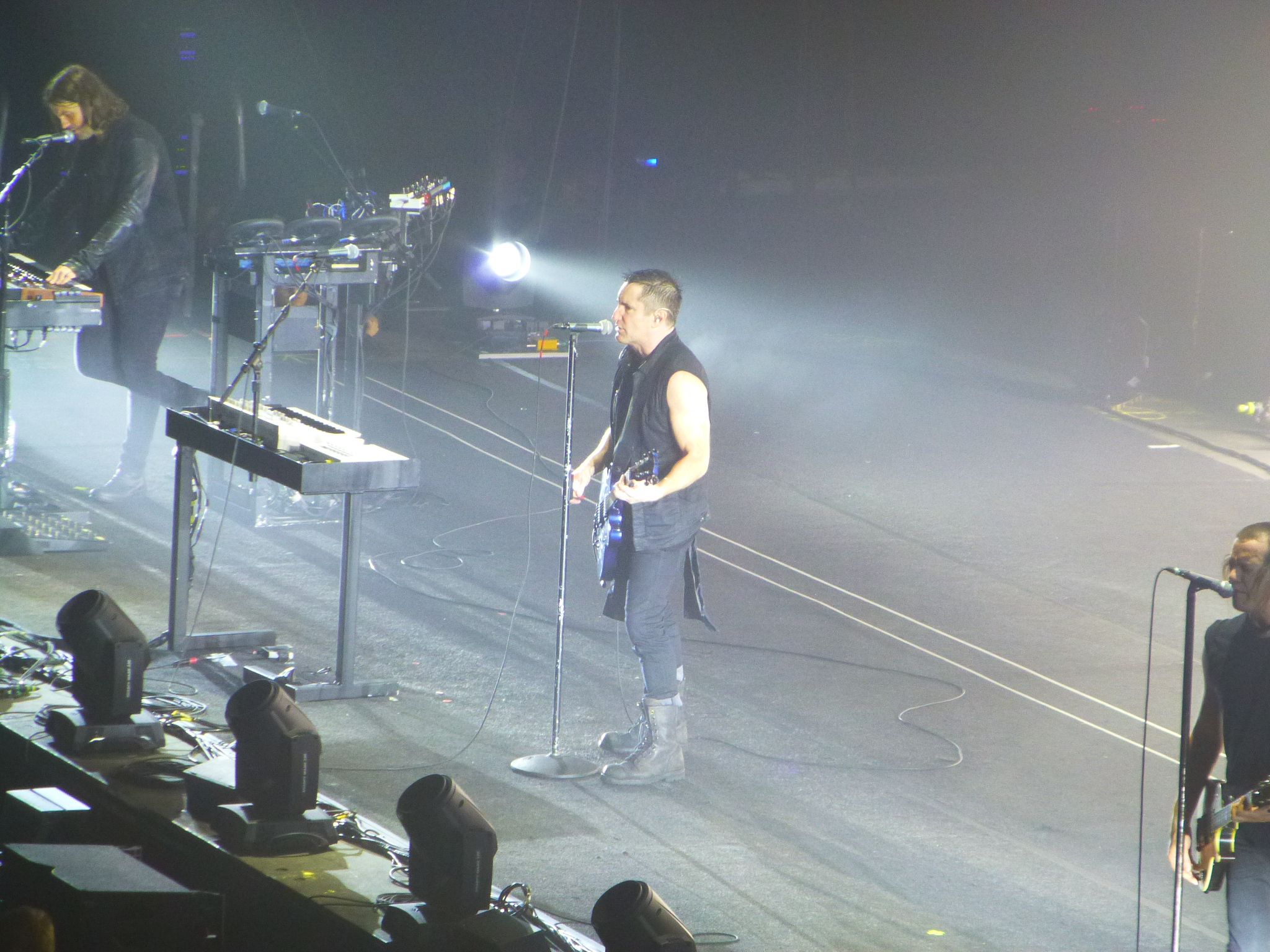
Trent Reznor performing with Nine Inch Nails in Manchester, May 2014.

=== Festival line-up (2013) ===
- Trent Reznor – lead vocals, guitar, keyboards, synthesizers
- Robin Finck – guitar, synthesizers, violin, backup vocals
- Joshua Eustis – bass, guitar, synthesizers, percussion, erhu, backup vocals
- Alessandro Cortini – keyboards, synthesizers, guitar, percussion, backup vocals
- Ilan Rubin – drums, percussion, keyboards, cello, backup vocals

=== Tension 2013 line-up ===
- Trent Reznor – lead vocals, guitar, keyboards, synthesizers
- Robin Finck – guitar, synthesizers, violin, backup vocals
- Joshua Eustis – guitar, synthesizers, percussion, saxophone, erhu, backup vocals
- Alessandro Cortini – keyboards, synthesizers, guitar, percussion, backup vocals
- Ilan Rubin – drums, percussion, keyboards, cello, backup vocals
- Pino Palladino – bass, fretless bass
- Lisa Fischer – backup vocals
- Sharlotte Gibson – backup vocals

=== NIN 2014 line-up ===
- Trent Reznor – lead vocals, guitar, keyboards, synthesizers
- Robin Finck – guitar, synthesizers, violin, backup vocals
- Alessandro Cortini – keyboards, synthesizers, guitar, bass, backup vocals
- Ilan Rubin – drums, bass, guitar, percussion, keyboards, backup vocals

== Setlist ==
July 26, 2013 – August 18, 21, 28 and 29, 2013, September 1, 2013
1. "Copy of A"
2. "Sanctified" or "Disappointed"
3. "Came Back Haunted"
4. "1,000,000"
5. "March of the Pigs"
6. "Piggy"
7. "The Frail"/"The Wretched" or "Reptile"
8. "Terrible Lie"
9. "Burn"
10. "Closer"
11. "Gave Up"
12. "Help Me I Am in Hell"
13. "Me, I'm Not" or "The Warning"
14. "Find My Way" or "What If We Could?" (The Girl with the Dragon Tattoo)
15. "The Way Out Is Through"
16. "Wish"
17. "Survivalism"
18. "Only"
19. "The Hand That Feeds"
20. "Head Like a Hole"
21. "Hurt"
"Something I Can Never Have", "I'm Afraid of Americans", "Somewhat Damaged" and "The Good Soldier" were added at some shows. "Closer" and "Hurt" weren't played at Pukkelpop. "Burn" and "Survivalism" were omitted at some shows.
August 20, 2013: Scala, London, England
1. "Pinion"
2. "Somewhat Damaged"
3. "The Beginning of the End"
4. "Terrible Lie"
5. "March of the Pigs"
6. "Piggy"
7. "The Frail"
8. "The Wretched"
9. "Closer"
10. "I'm Afraid of Americans" (David Bowie cover)
11. "Burn"
12. "Gave Up"
13. "Sanctified"
14. "Disappointed"
15. "The Warning"
16. "Wish"
17. "Survivalism"
18. "Suck" (Pigface cover)
19. "The Hand That Feeds"
20. "Head Like a Hole"

Encore

21. "The Day the World Went Away"
22. "Dead Souls" (Joy Division cover)
23. "Hurt"
August 23, 2013: Leeds Festival, England
1. "Wish"
2. "Terrible Lie"
3. "The Beginning of the End"
4. "1,000,000"
5. "Survivalism"
6. "March of the Pigs"
7. "Piggy"
8. "Burn"
9. "Reptile"
10. "Gave Up"
11. "Suck" (Pigface cover)
12. "The Frail"
13. "The Wretched"
14. "The Hand That Feeds"
15. "Head Like a Hole"
August 24, 2013: Rock en Seine, France
1. "Somewhat Damaged"
2. "The Beginning of the End"
3. "Terrible Lie"
4. "1,000,000"
5. "March of the Pigs"
6. "Piggy"
7. "Closer"
8. "Gave Up"
9. "Help Me I Am in Hell"
10. "Me, I'm Not"
11. "Find My Way"
12. "The Way Out Is Through"
13. "Wish"
14. "Only"
15. "The Hand That Feeds"
16. "Head Like a Hole"

Encore

17. "Hurt"
August 25, 2013: Reading Festival, England
1. "Copy of A"
2. "Disappointed"
3. "Came Back Haunted"
4. "Sanctified"
5. "Find My Way"
6. "Me, I'm Not"
7. "The Warning"
8. "Somewhat Damaged"
9. "The Beginning of the End"
10. "Terrible Lie"
11. "March of the Pigs"
12. "Survivalism"
13. "Burn"
14. "Gave Up"
15. "Wish"
September 3, 2013: Troubadour, West Hollywood, California, USA
1. "Pinion"
2. "Somewhat Damaged"
3. "The Beginning of the End"
4. "Terrible Lie"
5. "March of the Pigs"
6. "Piggy"
7. "The Frail"
8. "The Wretched"
9. "I'm Afraid of Americans" (David Bowie cover)
10. "Gave Up"
11. "Sanctified"
12. "Disappointed"
13. "The Warning"
14. "Find My Way"
15. "Came Back Haunted"
16. "Wish"
17. "Survivalism"
18. "Burn"
19. "The Hand That Feeds"
20. "Head Like a Hole"

Encore

21. "La Mer"
22. "Hurt"
Tension Tour 2013
1. "Copy of A"
2. "1,000,000"
3. "Terrible Lie"
4. "March of the Pigs"
5. "Piggy"
6. "All Time Low"
7. "Disappointed"
8. "Came Back Haunted"
9. "Find My Way"
10. "The Frail"/"The Wretched"
11. "Survivalism"
12. "Running"
13. "A Warm Place"
14. "Somewhat Damaged"
15. "Wish"
16. "The Hand That Feeds"
17. "Head Like a Hole"

Encore

18. "Even Deeper"
19. "While I'm Still Here"
20. "Black Noise"
21. "Hurt"
"Sanctified", "Reptile", "Burn", "The Day the World Went Away", "Into the Void", "The Big Come Down", All the Love in the World", "Only", "In This Twilight", "Echoplex", "Satellite", "Various Methods of Escape", "I Would For You", "In Two", "I'm Afraid of Americans" and "We Take Mystery (To Bed)" were added at some shows.

== Songlist ==
Album	Song	Times
Pretty Hate Machine (1989)	"Head Like a Hole"	64
Pretty Hate Machine (1989)	"Terrible Lie"	58
Pretty Hate Machine (1989)	"Sanctified"	38
Pretty Hate Machine (1989)	"Something I Can Never Have"	3
Broken (1992)	"Pinion"	2
Broken (1992)	"Wish"	62
Broken (1992)	"Help Me I Am in Hell"	12
Broken (1992)	"Gave Up"	28
The Downward Spiral (1994)	"Piggy"	53
The Downward Spiral (1994)	"March of the Pigs"	63
The Downward Spiral (1994)	"Closer"	14
The Downward Spiral (1994)	"A Warm Place"	34
The Downward Spiral (1994)	"Reptile"	17
The Downward Spiral (1994)	"Hurt"	63
The Fragile (1999)	"Somewhat Damaged"	40
The Fragile (1999)	"The Day the World Went Away"	9
The Fragile (1999)	"The Frail"	41
The Fragile (1999)	"The Wretched"	41
The Fragile (1999)	"Even Deeper"	32
The Fragile (1999)	"La Mer"	1
The Fragile (1999)	"The Way Out is Through"	11
The Fragile (1999)	"Into the Void"	8
The Fragile (1999)	"Please"	1
The Fragile (1999)	"The Big Come Down"	21
With Teeth (2005)	"All the Love in the World"	9
With Teeth (2005)	"The Hand That Feeds"	64
With Teeth (2005)	"Only"	22
With Teeth (2005)	"The Lines Begins To Blur"	2
With Teeth (2005)	"Beside You in Time"	5
Year Zero (2007)	"The Beginning of the End"	8
Year Zero (2007)	"Survivalism"	58
Year Zero (2007)	"The Good Soldier"	2
Year Zero (2007)	"Vessel"	3
Year Zero (2007)	"Me, I'm Not"	19
Year Zero (2007)	"The Warning"	10
Year Zero (2007)	"The Great Destroyer"	15
Year Zero (2007)	"In This Twilight"	10
Ghosts I–IV (2008)	"31 Ghosts IV"	1
The Slip (2008)	"1,000,000"	52
The Slip (2008)	"Letting You"	8
The Slip (2008)	"Echoplex"	7
Hesitation Marks (2013)	"The Eater of Dreams"	2
Hesitation Marks (2013)	"Copy of A"	62
Hesitation Marks (2013)	"Came Back Haunted"	56
Hesitation Marks (2013)	"Find My Way"	49
Hesitation Marks (2013)	"All Time Low"	44
Hesitation Marks (2013)	"Disappointed"	50
Hesitation Marks (2013)	"Satellite"	15
Hesitation Marks (2013)	"Various Methods of Escape"	19
Hesitation Marks (2013)	"Running"	31
Hesitation Marks (2013)	"I Would For You"	6
Hesitation Marks (2013)	"In Two"	12
Hesitation Marks (2013)	"While I'm Still Here"	34
Hesitation Marks (2013)	"Black Noise"	34
Covers	"Hand Covers Bruise" (Trent Reznor and Atticus Ross)	5
Covers	"What If We Could?" (Trent Reznor and Atticus Ross)	7
Covers	"Suck" (Pigface)	2
Covers	"Dead Souls" (Joy Division)	1
Covers	"I'm Afraid of Americans" (David Bowie)	9
Covers	"We Take Mystery (To Bed)" (Gary Numan)	2
Covers	"BBB" (How to Destroy Angels)	4
Covers	"Ice Age" (How to Destroy Angels)	4
Covers	"On the Wing" (How to Destroy Angels)	1
Covers	"Parasite" (How to Destroy Angels)	1
Songs from soundtracks movies	"Burn" (Natural Born Killers)	27

== Tour dates ==
Date	City	Country	Venue
Twenty Thirteen
Asia
July 26, 2013	Naeba	Japan	Fuji Rock Festival
July 28, 2013	Ansan	South Korea	Ansan Valley Festival
North America Leg #1
August 2, 2013	Chicago	United States	Lollapalooza
August 10, 2013	San Francisco	United States	Outside Lands
Europe
August 15, 2013	Hasselt	Belgium	Pukkelpop
August 16, 2013	Biddinghuizen	Netherlands	Lowlands Festival
August 18, 2013	Hockenheim	Germany	Rock'n'Heim Festival
August 21, 2013	Belfast	United Kingdom	Belsonic
August 23, 2013	Leeds	United Kingdom	Leeds Festival
August 24, 2013	Paris	France	Rock en Seine
August 25, 2013	Reading	United Kingdom	Reading Festival
August 28, 2013	Milan	Italy	Mediolanum Forum (with Tomahawk)
August 29, 2013	Zürich	Switzerland	Zürich OpenAir
North America Leg #2
September 1, 2013	Philadelphia	United States	Made in America Festival
Tension 2013
North America – with Godspeed You! Black Emperor/Explosions in the Sky
September 28, 2013	Saint Paul	United States	Xcel Energy Center
September 30, 2013	Kansas City	United States	Sprint Center
October 1, 2013	St. Louis	United States	Chaifetz Arena
October 3, 2013	Montreal	Canada	Bell Centre
October 4, 2013	Toronto	Canada	Air Canada Centre
October 5, 2013	Cleveland	United States	Wolstein Center
October 7, 2013	Auburn Hills	United States	The Palace of Auburn Hills
October 8, 2013	Pittsburgh	United States	Petersen Events Center
October 11, 2013	Boston	United States	TD Garden
October 12, 2013	Uncasville	United States	Mohegan Sun Arena
October 14, 2013	Brooklyn	United States	Barclays Center
October 15, 2013	Newark	United States	Prudential Center
October 18, 2013	Washington, D.C.	United States	Verizon Center
October 19, 2013	University Park	United States	Bryce Jordan Center
October 21, 2013	Raleigh	United States	PNC Arena
October 22, 2013	Nashville	United States	Bridgestone Arena
October 24, 2013	Atlanta	United States	Philips Arena
October 26, 2013	Asheville	United States	Mountain Oasis Electronic Music Summit
October 30, 2013	Sunrise	United States	BB&T Center
October 31, 2013	Orlando	United States	Amway Center
November 2, 2013	New Orleans	United States	Voodoo Festival
November 5, 2013	San Antonio	United States	AT&T Center
November 8, 2013	Los Angeles	United States	Staples Center
November 9, 2013	Phoenix	United States	US Airways Center
November 11, 2013	El Paso	United States	Don Haskins Center
November 13, 2013	Broomfield	United States	1stBANK Center
November 15, 2013	Las Vegas	United States	The Joint
November 16, 2013	Las Vegas	United States	The Joint
November 18, 2013	Portland	United States	Rose Garden
November 19, 2013	Spokane	United States	Spokane Arena
November 21, 2013	Vancouver	Canada	Rogers Arena
November 22, 2013	Seattle	United States	KeyArena
with Autolux
November 24, 2013	Edmonton	Canada	Rexall Place
November 25, 2013	Calgary	Canada	Scotiabank Saddledome
NIN 2014
Asia – with Alessandro Cortini
February 25, 2014	Tokyo	Japan	Studio Coast
February 26, 2014	Tokyo	Japan	Studio Coast
February 28, 2014	Tokyo	Japan	Studio Coast
Oceania – with Queens of the Stone Age and Brody Dalle
March 6, 2014	Sydney	Australia	Qantas Credit Union Arena
March 7, 2014	Sydney	Australia	Qantas Credit Union Arena
March 8, 2014	Newcastle	Australia	Newcastle Entertainment Centre
March 11, 2014	Perth	Australia	Perth Arena
March 13, 2014	Adelaide	Australia	Adelaide Entertainment Centre
March 14, 2014	Melbourne	Australia	Rod Laver Arena
March 15, 2014	Melbourne	Australia	Rod Laver Arena
March 17, 2014	Brisbane	Australia	Brisbane Entertainment Centre
March 19, 2014	Auckland	New Zealand	Vector Arena
March 20, 2014	Wellington	New Zealand	TSB Bank Arena
March 22, 2014	Christchurch	New Zealand	CBS Canterbury Arena
Latin America
March 27, 2014	Mexico City	Mexico	Vive Latino Festival
March 29, 2014	Santiago	Chile	Lollapalooza Chile
April 1, 2014	Buenos Aires	Argentina	Lollapalooza Argentina
April 3, 2014	Bogotá	Colombia	Festival Estereo Picnic
April 5, 2014	São Paulo	Brazil	Lollapalooza Brazil
Europe – with Cold Cave
May 6, 2014	Riga	Latvia	Arena Riga
May 8, 2014	Helsinki	Finland	Hartwall Arena
May 10, 2014	Stockholm	Sweden	Hovet
May 12, 2014	Oslo	Norway	Oslo Spektrum
May 13, 2014	Copenhagen	Denmark	Forum Copenhagen
May 15, 2014	Berlin	Germany	Zitadelle
May 16, 2014	Luxembourg	Luxembourg	Rockhal
May 18, 2014	Birmingham	United Kingdom	LG Arena
May 20, 2014	Glasgow	United Kingdom	The SSE Hydro
May 21, 2014	Cardiff	United Kingdom	Motorpoint Arena
May 23, 2014	London	United Kingdom	The O_{2} Arena
May 24, 2014	Nottingham	United Kingdom	Capital FM Arena
May 25, 2014	Manchester	United Kingdom	Phones 4u Arena
May 27, 2014	Amsterdam	Netherlands	Heineken Music Hall
May 28, 2014	Antwerp	Belgium	Lotto Arena
May 29, 2014	Paris	France	Le Zénith
May 31, 2014	Barcelona	Spain	Primavera Sound Festival
June 1, 2014	Toulouse	France	Le Zénith
June 3, 2014	Bologna	Italy	Unipol Arena
June 4, 2014	Zurich	Switzerland	Hallenstadion
June 5, 2014	Nürburgring	Germany	Rock am Ring Festival
June 6, 2014	Nürburg	Germany	Rock am Ring Festival
June 9, 2014	Vienna	Austria	Wiener Stadthalle
June 10, 2014	Katowice	Poland	Spodek
June 11, 2014	Prague	Czech Republic	The Forum
North America – with Soundgarden and Oneohtrix Point Never
July 18, 2014	Pemberton	Canada	Pemberton Music Festival
July 19, 2014	Las Vegas	United States	Planet Hollywood
July 21, 2014	Morrison	United States	Red Rocks Amphitheatre
July 22, 2014	Morrison	United States	Red Rocks Amphitheatre
July 24, 2014	Tinley Park	United States	First Midwest Bank Amphitheatre
July 26, 2014	Clarkston	United States	DTE Energy Music Theatre
July 27, 2014	Toronto	Canada	Molson Canadian Amphitheatre
July 29, 2014	Mansfield	United States	Xfinity Center
July 30, 2014	Camden	United States	Susquehanna Bank Center
August 1, 2014	Wantagh	United States	Nikon at Jones Beach Theatre
with Soundgarden and The Dillinger Escape Plan
August 2, 2014	Holmdel	United States	PNC Bank Arts Center
August 4, 2014	Bristow	United States	Jiffy Lube Live
August 5, 2014	Virginia Beach	United States	Farm Bureau Live
August 7, 2014	Charlotte	United States	PNC Music Pavilion
August 8, 2014	Atlanta	United States	Aaron's Amphitheatre at Lakewood
August 10, 2014	West Palm Beach	United States	Cruzan Amphitheatre
August 11, 2014	Tampa	United States	MidFlorida Credit Union Amphitheatre
August 14, 2014	Austin	United States	Austin360 Amphitheater
August 16, 2014	The Woodlands	United States	Cynthia Woods Mitchell Pavilion
with Soundgarden and Cold Cave
August 17, 2014	Dallas	United States	Gexa Energy Pavilion
August 19, 2014	Albuquerque	United States	Isleta Amphitheater
August 21, 2014	Chula Vista	United States	Sleep Train Amphitheatre
August 22, 2014	Irvine	United States	Verizon Wireless Amphitheatre
August 24, 2014	Mountain View	United States	Shoreline Amphitheatre
August 25, 2014	Los Angeles	United States	Hollywood Bowl
August 27, 2014	Sacramento	United States	Sleep Train Amphitheatre
August 29, 2014	Portland	United States	Sleep Country Amphitheater
August 30, 2014	Seattle	United States	White River Amphitheatre
