= Recoiled =

Remix album / EP by Coil and Nine Inch Nails
- Released: February 24, 2014
- Genre: Post-industrial
- Length: 29:56 (Digital); 38:48 (CD and Vinyl)
- Label: Cold Spring – CSR193CD

Coil chronology
Colour Sound Oblivion (2010)	Recoiled (2014)

Nine Inch Nails chronology
Remix 2014 EP (2014)	Recoiled (2014)	Halo I–IV (2015)

Professional ratings
Review scores
Source	Rating
Fearnet	Positive
PopMatters	6/10 stars

Recoiled is an EP by Coil and Nine Inch Nails described as "a compilation of Coil's unreleased work for Nine Inch Nails" and "outtakes from the remix sessions from Fixed, Closer to God and Further Down the Spiral". It was released on February 24, 2014, via British record label Cold Spring. It was released posthumously after the deaths of the two original Coil members, Peter Christopherson and John Balance. Danny Hyde, a former employee and engineer of Coil, later licensed the remixes to Cold Spring. The release is composed of variations of previously released remixes, which appeared on the albums Fixed, Further Down the Spiral and the "Closer to God" single.

Recoiled is based on the fan-created digital EP, "Uncoiled", initially released freely on The Pirate Bay as fully tagged MP3s and FLAC files of the remixes, including original photography and printable jewel case inserts.

The EP contains remixes of four Nine Inch Nails songs, including "Gave Up", from Broken (1992), and "Closer", "The Downward Spiral" and "Eraser", from The Downward Spiral (1994). The Cold Spring release of the album features additional mastering, and a remix of the song "Eraser" that was not on "Uncoiled".

== Background ==
In a press release, the label stated:

These five lengthy compositions are pre-Ableton/laptop generation type priest song creations... with the use of baby alarms and numerous wires to create bespoke effects. These legendary tracks were always rumored to exist and, only the due diligence of a dedicated NIN forum who hunted them down, are released/unleashed for your listening pleasure.

In 2012, members of the Nine Inch Nails fan-site echoingthesound.org collected funds to send to Danny Hyde, who had revealed the existence of out-takes of commission work Coil had produced for various Nine Inch Nails singles and EPs. Hyde mailed a CDR to a member of the forum, and the tracks were shared on The Pirate Bay as "Nine Inch Nails - Uncoiled" and included embedded artwork for each track.

When Cold Spring released Recoiled in 2014, there were reports that the limited edition brown splatter vinyl copies suffered from a pressing defect rendering them unplayable. These issues were not reported with the standard black vinyl, nor with the follow-up picture disc edition.

Cold Spring requested permission from the creators of Uncoiled for the use of the photography from that digital release, which was created by a member of echoingthesound.org as an homage to Russell Mills' bloody, frayed rope mixed-media artwork used for Further Down the Spiral.

In January 2018, Hyde posted a 21 minute video on YouTube where he talks about how he created the remixes after being contacted by the forum members by utilizing samples from the era.

== Track listing ==
=== Digital version ===
No.	Title	Length
1.	"Gave Up (Open My Eyes)"	5:28
2.	"Closer (Unrecalled)"	7:41
3.	"The Downward Spiral (A Gilded Sickness)"	7:59
4.	"Eraser (Reduction)"	8:48
Total length:		29:56

=== CD version ===
No.	Title	Length
1.	"Gave Up (Open My Eyes)"	5:28
2.	"Closer (Unrecalled)"	7:41
3.	"The Downward Spiral (A Gilded Sickness)"	7:59
4.	"Eraser (Reduction)"	8:48
5.	"Eraser (Baby Alarm Remix)"	8:52
Total length:		38:48

=== Vinyl version ===
A side
No.	Title	Length
1.	"Gave Up (Open My Eyes)"	5:28
2.	"Closer (Unrecalled)"	7:41
3.	"The Downward Spiral (A Gilded Sickness)"	7:59

B side
No.	Title	Length
1.	"Eraser (Reduction)"	8:48
2.	"Eraser" (Baby Alarm Remix)	8:52
Total length:		38:48

== Personnel ==
Coil

- Peter Christopherson
- John Balance

Nine Inch Nails

- Trent Reznor

Other personnel

- Danny Hyde
- Marius Andrei Dima – photography
- Abby Helasdottir – design
- Gregg Janman – mastering
- Hermetech Mastering – mastering
