= Live 2013 EP =

EP by Nine Inch Nails
- Released: September 10, 2013
- Recorded: July 26, 2013 in Naeba, Japan; August 2, 2013 at Grant Park in Chicago
- Genre: Industrial rock; electronic
- Length: 21:54
- Label: The Null Corporation

Nine Inch Nails chronology
Hesitation Marks (2013)	Live 2013 EP (2013)	Remix 2014 EP (2014)

Live 2013 EP is the third extended play (EP) by American industrial rock band Nine Inch Nails. It was released on September 10, 2013, exclusively on Spotify.

The EP features live versions of four tracks, recorded during the Twenty Thirteen Tour. It includes three tracks from the band's 2013 album, Hesitation Marks, "Copy of a", "Came Back Haunted", and "Find My Way", along with an alternative live version of "Sanctified", which is from the band's 1989 debut album, Pretty Hate Machine.

== Track listing ==
No.	Title	Length
1.	"Copy of a" (live at Fuji Rock Festival)	6:13
2.	"Came Back Haunted" (live at Lollapalooza 2013)	5:22
3.	"Sanctified" (live at Lollapalooza 2013)	4:53
4.	"Find My Way" (live at Lollapalooza 2013)	5:26
Total length:		21:54

== Personnel ==
Nine Inch Nails

- Trent Reznor – lead vocals, guitar, keyboards, synthesizers
- Robin Finck – guitar, synthesizers, backing vocals
- Josh Eustis – bass, synthesizers
- Alessandro Cortini – keyboards, synthesizers, guitar, backing vocals
- Ilan Rubin – drums, percussion, cello

Additional personnel

- Michael Patterson – mixing
- Paul Logus – mastering
- Russell Mills – artwork
- Rob Sheridan – design
