= Live 2013 =

Live 2013 may refer to:

- Live 2013 EP, a 2013 EP by Nine Inch Nails
- Céline une seule fois / Live 2013, a 2014 album by Celine Dion
- Trilogia 1983–1989 live 2013, a 2013 album by Litfiba
- Time: Live Tour 2013, a concert tour by Tohoshinki
