= Remix 2014 EP =

EP by Nine Inch Nails
- Released: January 21, 2014
- Genre: Electronica; post-industrial
- Length: 23:53
- Label: Columbia
- Producer: Trent Reznor

Nine Inch Nails chronology
| Live 2013 EP (2013) | Remix 2014 EP (2014) | Recoiled (2014) |

Remix 2014 EP is the fourth extended play (EP) by American industrial rock band by Nine Inch Nails. It was released on January 21, 2014, exclusively on Beats Music, a streaming service project led by Trent Reznor and Dr. Dre. Trent Reznor acts as the chief creative officer of the website.

The EP features remixes of four songs from the band's 2013 album, Hesitation Marks. These songs include "Satellite", "Running", "Copy of a" and "Everything", which are remixed by Hot Chip, Cold Cave, Simian Mobile Disco, and Autolux, respectively.

== Track listing ==
| No. | Title | Length |
|---|---|---|
| 1. | "Satellite" (Hot Chip remix) | 6:44 |
| 2. | "Running" (Cold Cave remix) | 4:20 |
| 3. | "Copy of A" (Simian Mobile Disco remix) | 8:22 |
| 4. | "Everything" (Autolux remix) | 4:29 |
| Total length: | | 23:53 |

== Personnel ==
Nine Inch Nails

- Trent Reznor

Remixers

- Hot Chip
- Cold Cave
- Simian Mobile Disco
- Autolux
