= This Is a Trent Reznor Song =

2014 parody song by Freddy Scott

"This Is a Trent Reznor Song" is a 2014 parody song by American comedian and musician Freddy Scott about the stylistic elements commonly found in songs by Nine Inch Nails leader Trent Reznor. The tune is inspired by the Nine Inch Nails song "Copy of a".

== Reception ==
Spin described the song as "reductive, unfair, and more than a little silly" but also "priceless" for its accuracy. Entertainment Weekly praised it as a "spot-on homage" and "pretty hilarious". At Stereogum, Tom Breihan called it "great" and "something (he)'d listen to [even] if it didn't have joke lyrics" but considered the song's value as a parody lessened by the fact that Scott chose to emphasize stylistic elements common in Reznor's earlier work but not his more recent songs.

== Video ==
Scott has said he is a "huge fan" of Reznor, whose work he has described as "absolutely brilliant." In March 2014, Scott released a music video for the song, inspired by the videos for the Nine Inch Nails songs "Closer", "The Hand That Feeds", and "We're in This Together". Entertainment Weekly considered it "a little more outwardly funny than the song itself" while still showing "reverence for Reznor's work". Consequence of Sound stated that it was "every bit as amazingly and amusingly on-point" as the song. Stereogum found that the "jokes-per-minute ratio could be higher" while noting the success of the jokes that are present, particularly lauding the use of a box labeled "Weird Sound".
