= Mr. Self Destruct =

1994 song by Nine Inch Nails

Song by Nine Inch Nails

from the album The Downward Spiral
- Released: March 8, 1994
- Recorded: 1993
- Studio: 10050 Cielo Drive (Le Pig), Beverly Hills, California
- Genre: Industrial metal
- Length: 4:31
- Label: Interscope; Nothing; TVT
- Songwriter: Trent Reznor
- Producers: Trent Reznor; Flood

The Downward Spiral track listing
- 14 tracks: 1. "Mr. Self Destruct"; 2. "Piggy"; 3. "Heresy"; 4. "March of the Pigs"; 5. "Closer"; 6. "Ruiner"; 7. "The Becoming"; 8. "I Do Not Want This"; 9. "Big Man With A Gun"; 10. "A Warm Place"; 11. "Eraser"; 12. "Reptile"; 13. "The Downward Spiral"; 14. "Hurt"

"Mr. Self Destruct" is a song by American industrial rock act Nine Inch Nails. It was released on March 8, 1994. Written by frontman Trent Reznor, co-produced by Flood and recorded at Le Pig in 1993, it is the opening track of The Downward Spiral (1994), and introduces the album's "ugly" aesthetic and mostly "angry" tone. The song also gives a lyrical background of the album's protagonist. Its title is a reference to the eponymous opening track from English new wave duo Soft Cell's 1984 album This Last Night in Sodom.

Receiving positive feedback from music critics, its title became used as the official name for a tour by the act. "Mr. Self Destruct" has been remixed multiple times, with five of them appearing in its accompanying remix album, Further Down the Spiral (1995), and in 1996 Reznor granted film director David Fincher (whom he later collaborated along with Atticus Ross to create soundtracks to four of his films) the permission to use a remix of the song in a Levi's television advertisement.

== Writing and recording ==
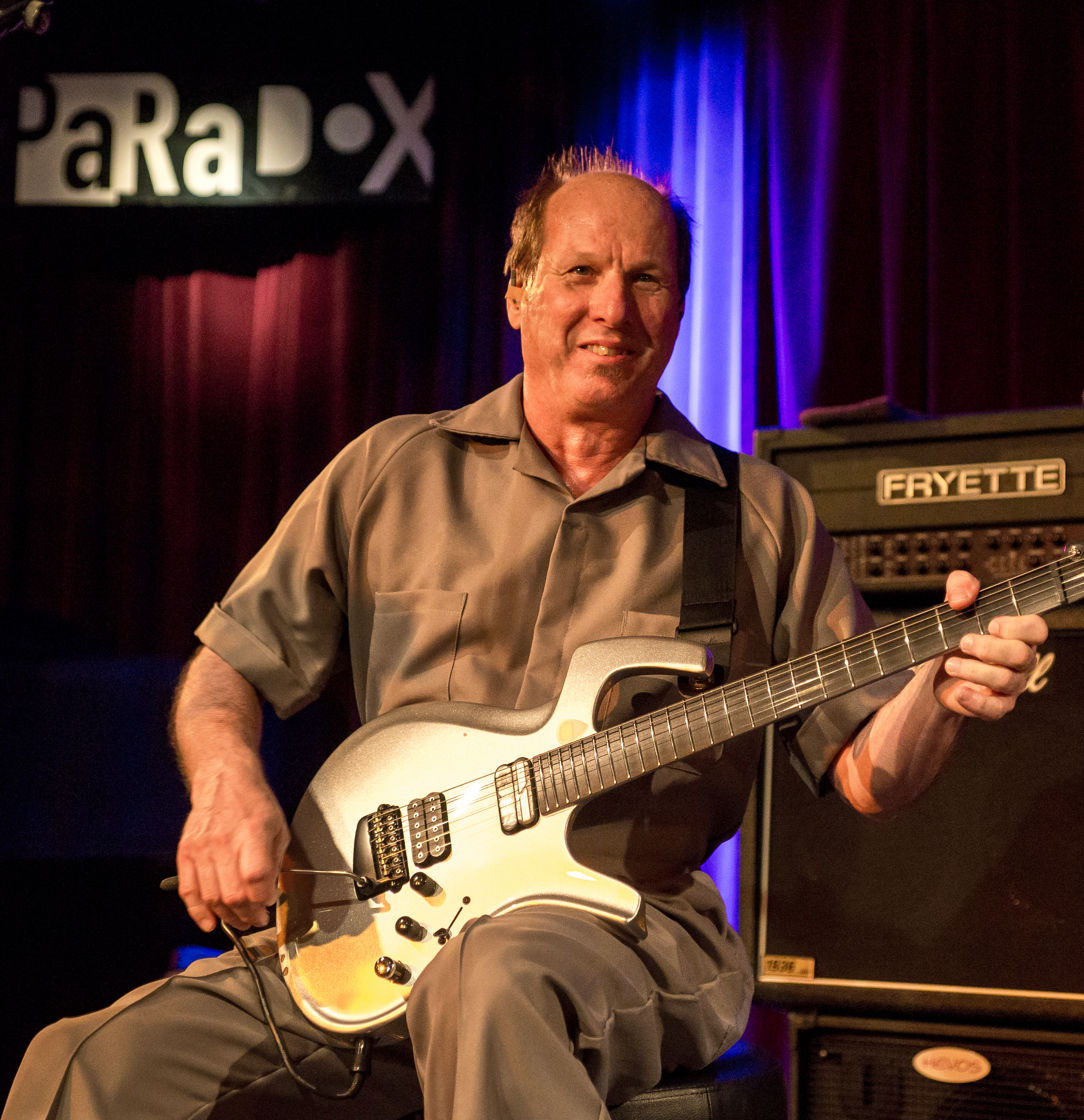
"Mr. Self Destruct" features contributions from Adrian Belew

The first ideas for the song were conceived after the act's role in the Lollapalooza 1991 festival. Production began after the completion of Broken (1992), when Reznor wrote a short poem. This was transformed into a prototype of "Mr. Self Destruct", along with many other songs. Flood was the co-producer of the song, as with the remainder of the then-upcoming album from Reznor's project.

Reznor sought to include Adrian Belew, and Flood invited him to the house surrounding the studio (10050 Cielo Drive). Upon entering Le Pig he asked, "Hi, what do you want me to do?". The production team communicated back to Belew, who spoke about what tuning the song was played at. Reznor responded, "Um, I'm not sure. Probably E. See what happens. Don't worry about it. Here's the tape, [and] do whatever you want. Go!". Belew eventually recorded what became the odd ending of the song.

== Music and lyrics ==
"Mr. Self Destruct" immediately foreshadows the aesthetic and tone of the rest of the album; the opening of the song features a sample from the George Lucas-directed THX 1138 of a man being beaten by a prison guard while flanked inside a jail, cutting immediately to Reznor's aggressive voice delivering the verses and choruses. These parts have a tempo of 200 BPM (like "Big Man with a Gun"). Reznor's casual vocal delivery contrasting with the cacophonous sounds around it.

The only section of the song to feature bass is the bridge, with Reznor's vocal providing the build. The remaining verse and chorus follow, concluding with pink noise gradually dominating the mix, before a three-second guitar loop, performed by Belew, is introduced; after repeating about fifteen times, the loop abruptly ends as the next track, "Piggy", begins. (Note: In a 2010 book Understanding Records: A Field Guide To Recording Practice, author Jay Hodgson names "Mr. Self Destruct", along with The Slip track "Corona Radiata" and Modwheelmood's remix of "The Great Destroyer" (from Year Zero Remixed), an example of feedback fade-out.) The song is based on a D pentatonic scale.

The lyrics of the song introduce the antagonist of The Downward Spiral; who ominously calls himself "the voice inside your head." He represents the urges of sexuality, powers of addiction, and inescapable feelings of guilt and fear. He appears to be violent, even sociopathic, at certain points ("I am the bullet in the gun"), but also claims to represent the purposes of religion, and the ultimate, unattainable goal of all human desire.

The lyrics employ consistent repetition; with all but one line in the verses taking the form "I am... and I control you." The chorus maintains the first-person voice as well, creating an aggressive, intimate, almost confessional tone which Reznor sustains throughout the record.

== Release and reception ==
Rolling Stone stated about "Mr. Self Destruct", "The soft passages are soft chiefly in the sense of not being loud, as if there were a really great party down the street that you were wimping out on, pumped guitars and cranking boom-thwack drum machines and what not. But almost as soon as you rush to your pre-amp and squeeze in more juice, the loud comes back in, but so unimaginably loud this time that you think your speaker coils might melt, and old man Reilly in the next apartment has already started to bang his broomstick on the wall." "Mr. Self Destruct" was remixed five times for Further Down the Spiral (1995), including a remix produced by Reznor with the Nine Inch Nails live band, three remixes by JG Thirlwell, and a re-work partially produced by Aphex Twin.

=== Media usage ===
In 1996, a remix of "Mr. Self Destruct" ("Self Destruction, Part Two") was used with permission from Reznor in a Levi's television advertisement, which was directed by David Fincher (noteworthy at the time of the advertisement's release date for directing his 1995 breakthrough movie Seven). Fincher later directed the music video for "Only" in June 2005, and along with Atticus Ross, Reznor later collaborated with him for the soundtracks to the films The Social Network (2010), The Girl with the Dragon Tattoo (2011), Gone Girl (2014) and Mank (2020). In 2004, "Mr. Self Destruct" was featured in Man on Fire (2004), a film Reznor was involved with.

== Personnel ==
All credits adapted from the liner notes of the main album.

- Trent Reznor — vocals, guitar, bass, keyboards, programming, co-production
- Adrian Belew — "texture generating guitar"
- Chris Vrenna — samples
- Flood — co-production
- Alan Moulder — mixing

== Bibliography ==
- The Downward Spiral (CD booklet). Nine Inch Nails. Interscope Records. 1994.
- Huxley, Martin (September 1997). Nine Inch Nails: Self Destruct. St. Martin's Press. ISBN 0-312-15612-X. LCCN 97005105. OCLC 36364150.
- Moorefield, Virgil (2005). The Producer as Composer: Shaping the Sound of Popular Music. The MIT Press. pp. 74–77. ISBN 0-262-13457-8. LCCN 2005041588. OCLC 906947310.
- Steiner, Adam (March 1, 2020). Into The Never: Nine Inch Nails and The Creation of the Downward Spiral. Backbeat. ISBN 978-1617137310.
