= Hesitation Marks =

2013 album by Nine Inch Nails

- Digital standard edition cover

Studio album by Nine Inch Nails
- Released: August 30, 2013
- Recorded: 2012 – May 2013
- Genres: Industrial rock; electronica; electronic rock; alternative rock
- Length: 61:50
- Labels: The Null Corporation; Columbia
- Producers: Alan Moulder; Trent Reznor; Atticus Ross

Nine Inch Nails chronology
The Slip (2008)	Hesitation Marks (2013)	Live 2013 EP (2013)

Halo numbers chronology
Halo 27 (2008)	Halo 28 (2013)	Halo 29 (2016)

Singles from Hesitation Marks
- 1. "Came Back Haunted" Released: June 6, 2013; 2. "Copy of a" Released: August 13, 2013; 3. "Everything" Released: August 20, 2013

Hesitation Marks is the eighth studio album by the American industrial rock band Nine Inch Nails, released on August 30, 2013, by The Null Corporation and distributed by Columbia Records in the United States and Polydor Records elsewhere. It was the band's first release in five years, following The Slip (2008), as well as their only release on Columbia. Like previous albums, the album was produced by frontman Trent Reznor alongside longtime collaborators Atticus Ross and Alan Moulder. To date, this is the most recent Nine Inch Nails album to be co-produced by Moulder.

The album's title is derived from the term "hesitation marks", which is used to describe marks that are produced by testing a bladed weapon before attempting suicide or self-harming. The cover art also varies for each edition of the album. The record was promoted with three singles: "Came Back Haunted", "Copy of a", and "Everything", as well as the Twenty Thirteen Tour and two accompanying extended plays, Live 2013 EP and Remix 2014 EP. The digital version of the album was made available in two different masters: a standard version and one with extended dynamic range to cater to audiophiles.

Hesitation Marks received positive reviews from critics, with the new sound attracting praise, which some found to be a natural evolution from their previous work. The album reached number three in the US, their highest-charting album since Year Zero, and was nominated for a Grammy Award for Best Alternative Music Album at the 56th Annual Grammy Awards.

== Background ==
In February 2009, Trent Reznor stated, "I've been thinking for some time now it's time to make NIN disappear for a while", indicating the possible end of the act. Nine Inch Nails then entered a hiatus after touring with Jane's Addiction and performing on a few subsequent shows. Afterwards, Reznor clarified that the band was done with touring for the foreseeable future, but that he would continue to make music under the moniker.

In an interview with BBC Radio 1, Reznor indicated that he would be writing for the majority of 2012 with Nine Inch Nails "in mind". In 2012, Reznor confirmed that he was working on new Nine Inch Nails material and would possibly be performing live again. In February 2013, Reznor announced the return of Nine Inch Nails and revealed tour details. The album was first acknowledged by Trent Reznor on May 28, 2013, in a post on nin.com:

I've been less than honest about what I've really been up to lately. For the last year I've been secretly working non-stop with Atticus Ross and Alan Moulder on a new, full-length Nine Inch Nails record, which I am happy to say is finished and frankly fucking great. This is the real impetus and motivation behind the decision to assemble a new band and tour again. My forays into film, HTDA and other projects really stimulated me creatively and I decided to focus that energy on taking Nine Inch Nails to a new place. Here we go!"

The album began life as a couple of tracks that were meant to be included in a forthcoming greatest hits package for Interscope Records. The sessions gave way to more songs and ended up yielding an entire album. The two songs originally written and recorded for the hits package were revealed to be "Everything" and "Satellite".

== Release and promotion ==
On August 12, 2013, Amazon UK officially made the album's second track "Copy of a" available for free to download. On August 22, 2013, a radio rip of "Find My Way" was uploaded to YouTube. On August 27, 2013, the album was streamed on iTunes after it was leaked online. The album was made available in two different masters for digital download; a "standard" version and an "audiophile mastered" version, the latter of which having extended dynamic range not meant to be competitive in the loudness war.

=== Packaging ===
Each version of the album has its own cover with artwork by Russell Mills whose art was previously used 19 years earlier on The Downward Spiral, its accompanying singles, and the double VHS set Closure.

About the cover arts, Mills said:

This renewed collaboration very quickly suggested massive potential for the strange and the familiar to collide and collude in works that I hoped would encapsulate, by allusion, suggestion, metaphor and association, the conceptual ideas imbued in the album as well as in the undertow of its sonic world. I've tried to make works that obliquely allude to the essence of the subject matter, to its emotional core. I hope that they will invite multiple readings.

Mills also explained that the works explore ideas of "catharsis, of being into dissolution into being, both on a personal and sociological level." Mills said that the works allude to ideas about chaos and order. He also described the artworks as a "cross between the forensic and a pathology of the personal in which only fragments remain, in which minimal clues can suggest events that may have occurred."

During the creation of the cover arts, Mills used traditional materials such as oils, acrylic paints, varnishes and wires as well as miscellaneous objects which were subject to various chemical processes, including burning, bleaching, calcification and erosion. Blood was used for the standard CD cover and digital cover.

=== Tour ===
In February 2013, Reznor announced a tour in support of the album, it began in Summer 2013 and concluded in 2014. The initial line-up was Reznor, Eric Avery, Adrian Belew, Alessandro Cortini, Josh Eustis and Ilan Rubin but Avery and Belew would later leave before the tour began meanwhile Robin Finck was added to the line-up. The band's first show was in July at Fuji Rock Festival in Japan. A North American arena leg dubbed "Tension" ran from September until November, the leg added Pino Palladino, Lisa Fischer and Sharlotte Gibson to the line-up. Nine Inch Nails continued the tour as a 4-piece band in 2014 with Reznor, Rubin, Cortini and Finck in the lineup.

== Reception ==
Professional ratings
Aggregate scores
Source	Rating
AnyDecentMusic?	7.3/10
Metacritic	77/100
Review scores
Source	Rating
AllMusic	3.5/5 stars
The A.V. Club	B+
Entertainment Weekly	B+
The Guardian	4/5 stars
Los Angeles Times	2.5/4 stars
NME	8/10
Pitchfork	7.0/10
Q	4/5 stars
Rolling Stone	4/5 stars
Spin	9/10

According to the review aggregator Metacritic, Hesitation Marks received "generally favorable reviews" based on a weighted average score of 77 out of 100 from 40 critic scores. AllMusic critic and senior editor Stephen Thomas Erlewine stated: "Hesitation Marks makes it quite clear that Trent Reznor is no longer an angry young man but rather a restless, inventive artist who is at peace with himself, and the result is a record that provides real, lasting nourishment."

Jason Pettigrew of Alternative Press described the album as "both business as usual and remarkably prescient." Dave Simpson of The Guardian wrote: "Hesitation Marks is a very different beast to an intense industrial classic such as 1994's The Downward Spiral, but the darkness remains in lyrics that address self-doubt and the struggle for identity with honesty and candour." Writing for Kerrang!, George Garner inferred that "Hesitation Marks would provide Nine Inch Nails with a future every bit as promising as their illustrious past." NME critic Louis Pattison stated: "This is the sound of a cleaner, smoother Nine Inch Nails, one that delights in complexities of rhythm more than caustic blasts of rage."

Stuart Berman of Pitchfork wrote that the album is "much more in tune with the spartan grooves of the xx and the elastic electro of the Knife than [Reznor's] usual arena-rattling influences." David Fricke of Rolling Stone described the album as "one of Reznor's best", stating that "it combines the textural exploration on the 1999 double CD The Fragile, and the tighter fury of his 1994 master blast, The Downward Spiral." Christopher R. Weingarten of Spin regarded the album as "the most important artistic statement from Reznor since the late '90s." Nevertheless, Philip Cosores was mixed in his assessment of the album and thought: "For the album itself, the good ideas seem to have been wasted on trying to revive something that killed itself years ago."

"I was expecting Trent to come back angrier than ever," remarked Gary Numan. "He did something more unexpected than that. He comes back with something which doesn't seem that angry at all. Sonically, it's phenomenal. The quality of the sound and the recording are just absolutely amazing – so beautifully done… That's really brave: to come back with all those expectations and do something different, and make it work."

=== Accolades ===
Hesitation Marks was nominated for Best Alternative Music Album at the 2014 Grammy Awards. Rolling Stone, Stereogum, and Spin included it in their best albums of 2013 lists.

== Commercial performance ==
Hesitation Marks debuted at number three on the Billboard 200 with 107,000 copies sold in its first week - Nine Inch Nails' fifth top five album. As of December 2013, the album had sold 187,000 copies. In Canada, the album debuted atop the Canadian Albums Chart with first-week sales of 12,000 copies, becoming the band's first number-one album on the chart. The album was certified Gold in Canada on September 26, 2013. The album sold 12,286 copies to enter the UK Albums Chart at number two, earning the band its highest-charting album yet in the United Kingdom.

== Track listing ==
The full track listing was announced on June 21, 2013, along with the credits. The deluxe edition features three additional remixes and the iTunes edition includes an interview with Trent Reznor. The interview also includes three untitled demo songs from the album sessions, along with a demo sample of the song "All Time Low":

All songs written by Trent Reznor, except "The Eater of Dreams" by Trent Reznor and Alessandro Cortini. "While I'm Still Here" contains a lyrical interpolation from "Weary Blues from Waitin'" written and performed by Hank Williams.

No.	Title	Length
1.	"The Eater of Dreams"	0:52
2.	"Copy of a"	5:23
3.	"Came Back Haunted"	5:17
4.	"Find My Way"	5:16
5.	"All Time Low"	6:18
6.	"Disappointed"	5:44
7.	"Everything"	3:20
8.	"Satellite"	5:03
9.	"Various Methods of Escape"	5:01
10.	"Running"	4:08
11.	"I Would for You"	4:33
12.	"In Two"	5:32
13.	"While I'm Still Here"	4:03
14.	"Black Noise"	1:29
Total length:		61:50

Japanese edition bonus track
No.	Title	Length
15.	"Everything" (Autolux Remix)	4:29

Deluxe edition bonus tracks
No.	Title	Length
15.	"Find My Way" (Oneohtrix Point Never Remix)	4:47
16.	"All Time Low" (Todd Rundgren Remix)	5:49
17.	"While I'm Still Here" (Breyer P-Orridge 'Howler' Remix)	7:03

iTunes Store bonus track
No.	Title	Length
18.	"Trent Reznor in Conversation With..."	41:58

== Personnel ==
- Trent Reznor – vocals, electronics, guitar (tracks 2–14), percussion (tracks 2–10, 12, 13), bass (tracks 3–13), Wurlitzer (track 5), dulcitone (track 9), wheelharp (track 10), piano (track 11), saxophone (track 13), production

=== Additional musicians ===
- Alessandro Cortini – electronics (tracks 1, 3)
- Pino Palladino – bass (tracks 2, 5, 9, 13)
- Ilan Rubin – toms (tracks 2, 3), live drums (track 11)
- Lindsey Buckingham – guitars (tracks 2, 12, 13)
- Adrian Belew – guitars (tracks 4, 5, 9, 12), electronics (track 7), backing vocals (tracks 7, 11)
- Eugene Goreshter – strings (track 6), electronics (tracks 6, 11, 12), violin (track 11), bass (track 12)
- Daniel Rowland – electronics, guitar, additional sound design (track 7)
- Joshua Eustis – backing vocals (track 11)

=== Technical ===
- Atticus Ross – production, engineering
- Alan Moulder – production, mixing, engineering
- Tom Baker – mastering
- Russell Mills – artwork
- Rob Sheridan – art direction
- Jun Murakawa – engineering
- Dustin Mosley – engineering
- Ghian Wright – engineering
- Michael Patterson – engineering, mixing (track 1)
- Joe Barresi – drum recording
- Mike Fasano – drum technician

== Charts ==
=== Weekly charts ===
Chart (2013)	Peak position
Australian Albums (ARIA)	3
Austrian Albums (Ö3 Austria)	2
Belgian Albums (Ultratop Flanders)	6
Belgian Albums (Ultratop Wallonia)	14
Canadian Albums (Billboard)	1
Croatian Albums (HDU)	33
Czech Albums (ČNS IFPI)	4
Danish Albums (Hitlisten)	9
Dutch Albums (Album Top 100)	9
Finnish Albums (Suomen virallinen lista)	17
French Albums (SNEP)	22
German Albums (Offizielle Top 100)	5
Greek Albums (IFPI)	11
Irish Albums (IRMA)	5
Italian Albums (FIMI)	16
Japanese Albums (Oricon)	14
Mexican Albums (Top 100 Mexico)	94
New Zealand Albums (RMNZ)	7
Norwegian Albums (VG-lista)	23
Polish Albums (ZPAV)	17
Portuguese Albums (AFP)	13
Scottish Albums (Official Charts)	2
South Korean Albums (Gaon)	58
Spanish Albums (Promusicae)	20
Swedish Albums (Sverigetopplistan)	37
Swiss Albums (Schweizer Hitparade)	5
UK Albums (Official Charts)	2
UK Album Downloads (Official Charts)	9
UK Rock & Metal Albums (Official Charts)	2
US Billboard 200	3
US Top Alternative Albums (Billboard)	1
US Top Rock Albums (Billboard)	1

=== Year-end charts ===
Chart (2013)	Position
US Billboard 200	146
US Top Alternative Albums (Billboard)	23
US Top Rock Albums (Billboard)	34

== Certifications ==
Region	Certification	Certified units/sales
Canada (Music Canada)	Gold	40,000^{^}
Portugal (AFP)	Gold	7,500^{^}
^{^} Shipments figures based on certification alone.

== Release history ==
Region	Date	Label
Australia	August 30, 2013	Universal
Netherlands	August 30, 2013	Universal
Germany	August 30, 2013	Polydor
Ireland	August 30, 2013	Polydor
United Kingdom	September 2, 2013	Polydor
France	September 2, 2013	Mercury
United States	September 3, 2013	Columbia; The Null Corporation
Italy	September 3, 2013	Universal
Japan	September 4, 2013	Universal
