= Everything (Nine Inch Nails song) =

Nine Inch Nails song

Single by Nine Inch Nails

from the album Hesitation Marks
- Released: August 20, 2013
- Recorded: 2012–13
- Genre: Pop-punk; college rock; new wave; power pop
- Length: 3:16
- Label: Columbia; The Null Corporation
- Songwriter: Trent Reznor
- Producers: Alan Moulder; Trent Reznor; Atticus Ross

Nine Inch Nails singles chronology
"Copy of a" (2013)	"Everything" (2013)	"Less Than" (2017)

"Everything" is a song by American industrial rock band Nine Inch Nails from their eighth studio album Hesitation Marks (2013). It debuted on Zane Lowe's BBC Radio 1 program on August 19, 2013, and was released digitally the following day as the album's third and final single.

== Recording ==
The song was recorded during the recording sessions for a Nine Inch Nails greatest hits album, along with another song called "Satellite". These sessions gave way to more songs and ended up yielding an entire album. Reznor went on to state in another interview with The News & Observer, "There were a few moments of this album where I expected eyebrows to raise, but that actually was not one of them. To me, 'Everything' is a descendant of Fear and Joy Division and New Order. Somehow, that song has become representative of this as my 'happy album', although I don't hear it as such. It's certainly not meant to make you feel like, 'Look at how great everything is!' But it seems to be the shocking moment of the record. We've not played it onstage, only in rehearsals. It's become an irritant to me."

== Critical reception ==
The song was noted for being a departure from the band's musical style. Johnny Firecloud of CraveOnline described the song as "an unexpectedly bright pop-beat jam" and "a surprising sound from the notoriously dark & melancholy outfit". Andrew Trendell of Gigwise also reported that "whereas recent singles 'Came Back Haunted' and 'Copy of A' were [Reznor's] trademark pumelling industrial metal, 'Everything' rolls with an infectious pop-punk bounce in the verse before a typically ugly but nonetheless addictive chorus". He also described the song as "probably the poppiest moment that we have ever heard from Trent Reznor". Claire Lobenfeld of Stereogum gave the song a positive review, commenting that the song is "the most pop we've ever heard from the band" and comparing it to other 1990s alternative rock acts such as Lit and Foo Fighters.

Consequence of Sound described the song as "a sweeping rock anthem". Chris Martins of Spin magazine compared it to the band's hit 1994 song "Closer", while referring to it as "a surprisingly poppy, powered by major chord riffage and an upbeat backing track". He also stated that the track "swerves in and out of fiery punk passages that offset the catchier songwriting quite nicely" and that it "finds NIN veering into non-traditional territory". Fact magazine wrote that the song is "a relentlessly upbeat affair replete with harmonies on the chorus and an unusually propulsive beat, but seeing as Trent Reznor's involved it's hardly all sunshine and rainbows". Alex Hudson of Exclaim! described the song as uncharacteristically buoyant, while noting the pop influences and the vocal harmonies in the second verse. Nevertheless, he also noted plenty of noisy and dissonant elements typical of the band.

== Personnel ==
- Trent Reznor – vocals, electronics, percussion, guitar, production
- Adrian Belew – additional backing vocals, outro electronics
- Daniel Rowland – additional sound design, electronics, guitar
- Atticus Ross – production
- Alan Moulder – production
