= Burn (Nine Inch Nails song) =

Promotional single by Nine Inch Nails

from the album Natural Born Killers: A Soundtrack for an Oliver Stone Film
- Released: 1994
- Length: 4:58
- Label: Nothing; Interscope; Atlantic
- Songwriter: Trent Reznor
- Producer: Trent Reznor

Nine Inch Nails singles chronology
"Closer" (1994)	"Burn" (1994)	"Piggy" (1994)

"Burn" is a song recorded by American industrial rock band Nine Inch Nails for the soundtrack to the 1994 film Natural Born Killers. It was released as a promotional single from the soundtrack. The song was included as a bonus track on the 10th anniversary deluxe edition of The Downward Spiral in 2004. Live performances of the song are featured on KROQ Christmas 2005 and the concert film Beside You in Time.

== Music video ==
Reznor in front of a projection screen, showing a clip featuring Juliette Lewis from Natural Born Killers

The music video was co-directed by Hank Corwin and Trent Reznor. The video features Reznor performing in front of a projection screen displaying a montage of stock footage and footage from the Natural Born Killers film. The stock footage and rear-projection techniques used in the video are similar to the ones employed in much of the film.

Csaba Toth contributed a detailed reading of the video in his article "Like Cancer in the System: Industrial Gothic, Nine Inch Nails, and Videotape":

In the elliptic time frame of music video narratives, NIN's 'Burn' forms a commentary on the social state of things, positing images of the ruins of modernity's dream of progress. As the montage progress, it establishes complicated visual links between world-historical events and specifically American developments. We see a fascist march (in Italy), portrait of Hitler (twice), concentration camp victims, tanks rolling over trenches. Closer to home, a suburban mansion ('Absolutely No Trespassing' says the sign in front the eerily lifeless, almost Gothic, edifice), 1950s street scenes and family photographs, a beer sale sign, the American flag, and a church. [...] These 'historical' images are juxtaposed in an increasingly frantic pace with scenes of family life and especially family violence in America—a young boy violated by his father and a young girl sexually abused by hers. Toward the end, vampires loom over the contemporary wasteland.
