= Natural Born Killers (soundtrack) =

1994 soundtrack album

Natural Born Killers: A Soundtrack for an Oliver Stone Film

Soundtrack album by Various Artists
- Released: August 23, 1994
- Recorded: 1994
- Genre: Soundtrack
- Length: 75:22
- Label: Nothing/Interscope/Atlantic
- Producer: Trent Reznor

Trent Reznor chronology
Natural Born Killers (1994)	Lost Highway (1997)

Singles from Natural Born Killers: A Soundtrack for an Oliver Stone Film
- 1. "Burn" Released: 1994

Natural Born Killers: A Soundtrack for an Oliver Stone Film is the soundtrack to the film Natural Born Killers, produced by Trent Reznor of Nine Inch Nails. It was released on August 23, 1994. It charted at number 19 on US Billboard 200 album charts and was certified Gold in both the United States and Canada, and Silver in the United Kingdom.

== Background ==
Reznor reportedly produced the soundtrack using a portable Pro Tools in his hotel room while on his band's Self Destruct Tour. On his approach to compiling the soundtrack, Reznor told MTV:

I suggested to Oliver [Stone] to try to turn the soundtrack into a collage-of-sound, kind of the way the movie used music: make edits, add dialog, and make it something interesting, rather than a bunch of previously-released music.

Some songs were written especially for the film or soundtrack, such as "Burn" by Nine Inch Nails and "What Would You Do?" by Tha Dogg Pound.

"I took a finished movie," Reznor recalled, "and tried to make something that would be a cool souvenir from it."

== Reception ==
Professional ratings
Review scores
Source	Rating
AllMusic	4.5/5 stars
Chicago Tribune	link
Los Angeles Times	3.5/4 stars
Q	5/5 stars

"Bernard Herrmann's phenomenally eerie Vertigo score, Vangelis's groundbreaking synth-based ambience for Blade Runner, Nino Rota's timeless Godfather suite – any self-appointed buff of the soundtrack genre might blanch at the notion of making shelf-room alongside these classics for a furious miscellaneous music compilation…" wrote Andrew Collins in Q, "but, hey, as Mickey says, 'This is the 1990s,' and, if you were a soundtrack album, you'd be Natural Born Killers." Music magazine The Rocket described it as, "a non-stop pastiche of sound bites, songs and instrumental pieces sewn together" that "chillingly recreates the disturbing surreal darkness of this non-stop killing spree," concluding "Reznor's soundtrack is nearly as compelling as the movie, yet without the shocking visual images."

== Track listing ==
1. Leonard Cohen – "Waiting for the Miracle" (Edit)
2. L7 – "Shitlist"
3. Dan Zanes – "Moon over Greene County" (Edit)
4. Patti Smith – "Rock N Roll Nigger" (Flood Remix)
5. Cowboy Junkies – "Sweet Jane" (Edit)
6. Bob Dylan – "You Belong to Me"
7. Duane Eddy – "The Trembler" (Edit)
8. Nine Inch Nails – "Burn"
9. "Route 666"
  featuring Robert Downey Jr., and Brian Berdan – "BB Tone"
10. "Totally Hot"
  contains an edit of Remmy Ongala And Orchestre Super Matimila – "Kipenda Roho"
11. Patsy Cline – "Back in Baby's Arms"
12. Peter Gabriel And Nusrat Fateh Ali Khan – "Taboo" (Edit)
13. "Sex Is Violent"
  contains excerpts of Jane's Addiction – "Ted, Just Admit It..." and Diamanda Galás – "I Put a Spell on You"
14. A.O.S. – "History (Repeats Itself)" (Edit)
15. Nine Inch Nails – "Something I Can Never Have" (Edited And Extended)
16. Russel Means – "I Will Take You Home"
17. The Hollywood Persuaders – "Drums a Go-Go" (Edit)
18. "Hungry Ants"
  contains excerpts of Barry Adamson – "Checkpoint Charlie" and "Violation of Expectation"
19. Dr. Dre – "The Day the Niggaz Took Over"
20. Juliette Lewis – "Born Bad"
  song and lyrics written by Cissie Cobb.
21. Sergio Cervetti – "Fall of the Rebel Angels" (Edit)
22. Lard – "Forkboy"
23. "Batonga In Batongaville"
  contains excerpts of The Budapest Philharmonic Orchestra – "A Night on Bare Mountain"
24. Nine Inch Nails – "A Warm Place" (Edit)
25. "Allah, Mohammed, Char, Yaar"
  contains excerpts of Nusrat Fateh Ali Khan & Party – "Allah, Mohammed, Char, Yaar" and Diamanda Galás – "Judgement Day"
26. Leonard Cohen – "The Future" (Edit)
27. Tha Dogg Pound – "What Would U Do?"

== Notes ==
The film also contains "Bombtrack" and "Take the Power Back" by Rage Against the Machine, "Cyclops" by Marilyn Manson, "Anthem" by Leonard Cohen, "The Heat" and "In Doubt" by Peter Gabriel, "If You Were the Woman and I Was the Man" by Cowboy Junkies, "The Way I Walk" cover by Robert Gordon, and "Ghost Town" by The Specials. These tracks are not included on the soundtrack album. Also includes samples of "Leader of the Pack" by The Shangri-Las, and Steven "Jesse" Bernstein's "No No Man-Part 1".

Tracks 9, 10, 13, 18, 21, 23 and 25 are assembled from various recordings and dialogue from the film.

The bathroom scene of this film contains a non-credited selection from the Melvins' Houdini; specifically, the surreal percussion track "Spread Eagle Beagle". Rumours surround the genesis of this track, including one that it was done by Kurt Cobain.

In the scene that depicts Mickey and Mallory's first meeting – as a sitcom parody entitled "I Love Mallory" – the following pieces are heard: "Happy-Go-Lively" by Laurie Johnson, "Happy Families" by Sam Fonteyn, "Pizzicato Playtime" by Sam Fonteyn, "Sentimental Song" by David Farnon, and "Domestic Fun" by Ernest Tomlinson.

Reportedly, Stone and Reznor wanted to include a track by Snoop Dogg on the soundtrack but Warner Bros. wouldn't allow it as he was, at the time of production, on trial for murder.

== Charts ==
Chart (1994–1995)	Peak position
Australian ARIA Albums Chart	14
Hungarian Albums (MAHASZ)	31
New Zealand RIANZ Albums Chart	14
US Billboard 200	19

== Certifications ==
Region	Certification	Certified units/sales
Canada (Music Canada)	Gold	50,000^{^}
United Kingdom (BPI)	Silver	60,000^{^}
United States (RIAA)	Gold	500,000^{^}
^{^} Shipments figures based on certification alone.
