= Further Down the Spiral =

Remix album by Nine Inch Nails
- Released: May 29, 1995
- Recorded: 1994–95
- Studio: Unique Studios (New York City)
- Genres: Post-industrial; electronica
- Length: 63:56; 68:59 (V2)
- Labels: Nothing; Interscope; TVT

Nine Inch Nails chronology
The Downward Spiral (1994)	Further Down the Spiral (1995)	The Fragile (1999)

Halo numbers chronology
Halo 9 (1994)	Halo 10 (1995)	Halo 11 (1997)

Professional ratings
Review scores
Source	Rating
AllMusic	3/5 stars
Los Angeles Times	2/4 stars in a 0-4 star scale
Select	1/5 stars
Spin	8/10

Further Down the Spiral is a remix album by the American industrial rock band Nine Inch Nails. It is the companion remix disc to the band’s second studio album, The Downward Spiral, and was released on May 29, 1995, in two editions, one denoted as Halo 10 (released in the United States), and the other as Halo 10 V2 (released in Japan, Australia, and the UK), each containing a different set of tracks.

The album was certified gold by the Recording Industry Association of America (RIAA) on June 26, 1996, denoting sales in excess of 500,000 copies in the US. It has since become one of the best selling remix albums of all time. Further Down the Spiral showed a more varied and experimental point of view to the original and boasted many high-profile remixers and contributors including Aphex Twin, Coil with Danny Hyde, JG Thirlwell, and Rick Rubin with Dave Navarro.

The discs include remixes of "Mr. Self Destruct", "Piggy", "Hurt", "Eraser", "The Downward Spiral", "Heresy", "Reptile", and "Ruiner", as well as two original compositions by Aphex Twin.

== Background ==
=== Aphex Twin's contributions ===
Aphex Twin's two contributions to Further Down the Spiral are not remixes but rather new works composed specifically for the album. Aphex Twin is the performance moniker of British electronic musician Richard D. James, who was quoted about his various "remixes" as saying "I never heard the originals, I still haven't. I don't want to either, or my remixes for that matter." Both tracks would later appear in shortened form on Aphex Twin's 2003 compilation 26 Mixes for Cash. "At the Heart of It All" shares its name with a Coil piece from their 1984 LP Scatology.

=== Coil on Reznor's remix files ===
In an interview from 1998, Coil describe the manner in which Reznor prepared the multitracks:

John Balance:
"It's good to get something Trent will send you because he'll send you a really precise, clean, good sounding master tape where you can take all the sections out and you can rearrange it totally. You get spoiled because such a good clean master comes to you, and you can say "Wow!" and rip it to shreds and do whatever you want."

Peter Christopherson:
"I think though, the last things we did for him, we actually got Studio Vision discs, with everything already laid out. He is very organized by the way."

=== Charlie Clouser on his process ===
In posts on the Gearslutz forum, former Nine Inch Nails collaborator Charlie Clouser described how he put his contributions together:

Heresy remix = Studio Vision triggering 2x NuBus SampleCell-1 8mb cards and 4 audio tracks of Protools-16. 1 track lead vox, 2 tracks gtr fx, 1 track for preachers and misc. Yes, 4 tracks of audio. First SampleCell loaded with drums and stuff, second one loaded with chopped gtr riffs. 8 megs each.

No Xpander. Bit-crushed "pox" arpeggios and distant descending melody from Emax SEHD rack with modwheel filter control. All guitars chopped into riffs and put in samplecells then retriggered from keyboard. Wild pitch fx on guitars by HyperPrism standalone (no plugins in those days). Backwards vocal fx by... it's a secret. Outboard filtering on guitars by Arp Solus via MPU-101 and maybe Peavey Spectrum Filter. Lead vox flattened with L1 offline in SD2 (again, no plugins in DAWs back then).

Mixed on Mackie 32x8 with no compressors or outboard eq. Send fx (incl. vox verb and delay) from QuadraVerb+ and maybe DP4. The phasey sound on guitars is either DP4 or else it's just an artifact of the HyperPrism pitch fx. Yes, Alesis Quadraverb and a Mackie 8-buss.

"Ruiner" remix? That had a sine-wave portamento sound that was actually "Init Voice" on the original DX-7 put through Arp Solus filter for gating fx. ... I loved that "Init Voice" patch. I wonder who programmed it?

== Track listing ==
Further Down the Spiral (US release)
No.	Title	Remixers / Contributors	Length
1.	"Piggy (Nothing Can Stop Me Now)"	Rick Rubin, Dave Navarro	4:02
2.	"The Art of Self Destruction, Part One"	Trent Reznor, Charlie Clouser, Chris Vrenna, Robin Finck, Danny Lohner, Brian Pollack, Sean Beavan	5:41
3.	"Self Destruction, Part Two"	J. G. Thirlwell	5:37
4.	"The Downward Spiral (The Bottom)"	John Balance, Peter Christopherson, Drew McDowall, Danny Hyde	7:28
5.	"Hurt (Quiet)"	Reznor, Vrenna	5:08
6.	"Eraser (Denial; Realization)"	Balance, Christopherson, McDowall, Hyde	6:33
7.	"At the Heart of It All"	Aphex Twin	7:14
8.	"Eraser (Polite)"	Balance, Christopherson, McDowall, Hyde	1:15
9.	"Self Destruction, Final"	Thirlwell	9:52
10.	"The Beauty of Being Numb"	Reznor, Clouser, Vrenna, Finck, Lohner, Pollock (Section A); Aphex Twin (Section B)	5:06
11.	"Erased, Over, Out"	Balance, Christopherson, McDowall, Hyde	6:00
Total length:			63:56

Further Down the Spiral V2 (Japan, Australia, and UK release)
No.	Title	Remixers / Contributors	Length
1.	"Piggy (Nothing Can Stop Me Now)"	Rubin, Navarro	4:02
2.	"The Art of Self Destruction, Part One"	Reznor, Clouser, Vrenna, Finck, Lohner, Pollack, Beaven	5:41
3.	"Self Destruction, Part Three"	Thirlwell	3:28
4.	"Heresy (Version)"	Clouser	5:19
5.	"The Downward Spiral (The Bottom)"	Balance, Christopherson, McDowall, Hyde	7:28
6.	"Hurt (Live)"	Reznor, Clouser, Vrenna, Finck, Lohner	5:07
7.	"At the Heart of It All"	Aphex Twin	7:14
8.	"Ruiner (Version)"	Clouser	5:35
9.	"Eraser (Denial; Realization)"	Balance, Christopherson, McDowall, Hyde	6:33
10.	"Self Destruction, Final"	Thirlwell	9:52
11.	"Reptilian" (Japanese edition only, from "March of the Pigs" single)	Dave Ogilvie	8:39
Total length:			68:59

== Charts ==
Chart (1995)	Peak position
Australian Albums (ARIA)	51
Canada Top Albums/CDs (RPM)	46
US Billboard 200	23

== Certifications ==
Region	Certification	Certified units/sales
United Kingdom (BPI)	Gold	100,000^{^}
United States (RIAA)	Gold	500,000^{^}
^{^} Shipments figures based on certification alone.
