= Piggy (song) =

1994 promotional single by Nine Inch Nails

Promotional single by Nine Inch Nails

from the album The Downward Spiral
- B-side: "Hurt"
- Released: December 1994
- Recorded: Le Pig (Benedict Canyon, Los Angeles)
- Genre: Industrial rock; alternative rock
- Length: 4:24
- Label: Nothing; TVT; Interscope
- Songwriter: Trent Reznor
- Producers: Trent Reznor; Flood

The Downward Spiral track listing
- 14 tracks: 1. "Mr. Self Destruct"; 2. "Piggy"; 3. "Heresy"; 4. "March of the Pigs"; 5. "Closer"; 6. "Ruiner"; 7. "The Becoming"; 8. "I Do Not Want This"; 9. "Big Man With A Gun"; 10. "A Warm Place"; 11. "Eraser"; 12. "Reptile"; 13. "The Downward Spiral"; 14. "Hurt"

"Piggy" is a song by American industrial rock band Nine Inch Nails from their second studio album, The Downward Spiral (1994). It was written by Trent Reznor, co-produced by Flood, and recorded at Le Pig (10050 Cielo Drive). It was released in December 1994 as a promotional single from the album. The song is known for being Reznor's only live drumming performance.

== Recording ==
Reznor wrote the song after the extended play Broken (1992) was completed. It was initially a poem which he expanded into a full song. On July 4, 1992, he later moved to a house—famous for its status as the site of the gruesome Tate murders—and created a studio space there, calling it Le Pig. When asked about the building where production on the song was done, Reznor responded that he chose it merely for space considerations, claiming not to have been aware of the house's connection to the murders until after he chose it. "I looked at a lot of places", Reznor said. "And this just happened to be the one I liked most."

The studio name, Le Pig, alludes to the word "PIG" written with Tate's blood on the front door by the murderers, itself a reference to The Beatles' song "Piggies". This incident introduced Reznor to their 1968 album, the White Album, which included "Piggies".

The frantic drumming on the outro is Reznor's only attempt at performing drums on the record, and one of the few "live" drum performances on the album. He had stated that the recording was from him testing the microphone setup in studio, but he liked the sound too much not to include it.

== Music and lyrics ==
Former Nine Inch Nails guitarist Richard Patrick has claimed in various interviews that "Piggy" was Reznor's nickname for him and that the song was written in response to Patrick leaving the band.

This is the first NIN song to use the line "nothing can stop me now", which concludes the track. The phrase appears often in Reznor's later writing, making appearances in the songs "Ruiner", "Big Man with a Gun", "La Mer", "We're in This Together", and "Sunspots".

A leitmotif used throughout the album first appears on "Piggy". Pictured here is the pattern (transposed to A) on the album's title track

Quiet and slow overall, the song's tempo is 65 BPM, and played in the key of B. It is also the first track on the album to use "The Downward Spiral leitmotif", albeit on the organ. It also appears on "Closer" on piano, the title track on acoustic guitar, and "A Warm Place" with the acoustic guitar part reversed.

== Release and reception ==
"Piggy" was released as a promotional single on The Downward Spiral in December 1994. The single was labeled as halo number ten, and has no music video created in promotion of the song. It reached number 20 on the Billboard Modern Rock Tracks chart, making the album fly upwards to number 62. "Piggy (Nothing Can Stop Me Now)," a remix of "Piggy" produced by Rick Rubin and featuring Dave Navarro on guitar, appears on The Downward Spiral's accompanying remix album, Further Down the Spiral (1995). The subtitle is the "nothing can stop me now" lyric.

== Personnel ==
- Trent Reznor – vocals, guitars, bass guitar, piano, organ, synthesizers, drums, percussion, production
- Flood – production
- Alan Moulder – mixing engineer

== Track listing ==
- US promotional CD single
1. "Piggy" (radio edit) – 4:28
2. "Hurt" (radio edit) – 4:39
3. "Piggy" (Rick Rubin Remix) – 4:02

== Charts ==
Chart (1995)	Peak position
US Alternative Airplay (Billboard)	20
