= Gave Up =

Nine Inch Nails song

Song by Nine Inch Nails

from the EP Broken
- Released: September 22, 1992
- Genre: Industrial metal
- Length: 4:08
- Label: Nothing, TVT, Interscope
- Songwriter: Trent Reznor
- Producers: Flood, Trent Reznor

"Gave Up" is a song by American industrial rock band Nine Inch Nails. Written by frontman Trent Reznor and co-produced by Flood, the song serves as the sixth track of Nine Inch Nails' 1992 EP, Broken. The song is noted for its multiple music videos and became a concert favorite during the band's live performances. The video, which features Marilyn Manson and Richard Patrick “Filter” was filmed at 10050 Cielo Drive, the house where Sharon Tate was murdered by members of the Manson Family.

== Music and lyrics ==
The song is noted for its aggressive tone, fast tempo and heavier use of guitars, in contrast to Reznor's previous dance-oriented songs from the album Pretty Hate Machine. The song also features prominent use of Mellotron MKIV, which was previously owned by the Beatles' deceased frontman John Lennon. Robotic vocal effects are also present in the song.

Lyrically, the song addresses the themes of isolation, belongingness, self-hatred and agony. Reznor's angst-filled lyrics in this song, such as "After everything I've done I hate myself for what I've become" was regarded as a solidification of his status as "the dark lord of doom."

== Music videos ==
Two different videos exist for "Gave Up". One is footage of the band performing the song at the Le Pig studio at 10050 Cielo Drive, where Nine Inch Nails recorded The Downward Spiral and parts of Broken (directed by Jon Reiss). The album version of "Gave Up" was not used for the video's audio; rather, the band re-recorded the song specifically for the video, which featured Nine Inch Nails members Reznor on vocals, Chris Vrenna on drums, and Richard Patrick on vocals and guitar. In addition, studio guests Manson appeared on vocals and Brian Liesegang appeared on keyboards. The video was the last one to feature Patrick, as he left Nine Inch Nails shortly after to form the band Filter alongside Liesegang.

The other "Gave Up" video is the original footage of the finale to The Broken Movie. This video used the original audio of "Gave Up" from Broken.

== In popular culture ==
The song was extensively played during the shooting of the Lost Highway's bowling alley scene, by the demand of the director David Lynch.
