= Came Back Haunted =

2013 single by Nine Inch Nails

Single by Nine Inch Nails

from the album Hesitation Marks
- Released: June 6, 2013
- Recorded: 2012–13
- Genre: Industrial rock; electronica
- Length: 5:17
- Label: Columbia; The Null Corporation
- Songwriter: Trent Reznor
- Producers: Trent Reznor; Atticus Ross; Alan Moulder

Nine Inch Nails singles chronology
"Discipline" (2008)	"Came Back Haunted" (2013)	"Copy of a" (2013)

Music video
- “Came Back Haunted” on YouTube

"Came Back Haunted" is a song by American industrial rock band Nine Inch Nails, released as the first single from their eighth studio album Hesitation Marks on June 6, 2013.

== Music and lyrics ==
The song contains layered synthesizer parts, rhythmic industrial patterns, and an electronic bassline, which are interrupted by a guitar-driven instrumental break. The song ends with a vocal outro chanting the song's title. Billboard interpreted the lyrics as an acknowledgement of Nine Inch Nails' hiatus from 2009 to 2013.

== Release and promotion ==
The song was the band's first single after signing with Columbia Records. It was also released by Reznor's own label, The Null Corporation.

The song first leaked online on Brazilian website BCharts, then spread to other sites. It was later streamed on the band's official SoundCloud account. The audio-only video was also uploaded to Nine Inch Nails' YouTube channel. A radio edit of the song was initially made available, which was edited down to 3:56 in length.

== Music video ==
The music video was released on June 28, 2013. It was directed by David Lynch, with whom Reznor previously collaborated on the film Lost Highway (1997). The video begins with a photosensitive epilepsy warning and consists of quick cuts between flashing lights, unsettling images, and extreme close-ups of Reznor's eyes. Photographs taken by Rob Sheridan during the video's shooting in Los Angeles were released the day before the video premiered.

== Personnel ==
- Trent Reznor – vocals, guitar, bass, electronics, percussion, production
- Alessandro Cortini – additional electronics
- Ilan Rubin – tom drum
- Atticus Ross – production
- Alan Moulder – production

== In popular culture ==
The song was included on the soundtrack of the 2013 video game Gran Turismo 6.

== Charts ==
=== Weekly charts ===
Weekly chart performance for "Came Back Haunted"
Chart (2013)	Peak position
Canada Hot 100 (Billboard)	94
Canada Rock (Billboard)	11
US Bubbling Under Hot 100 (Billboard)	9
US Hot Rock & Alternative Songs (Billboard)	13
US Rock & Alternative Airplay (Billboard)	6

=== Year-end charts ===
Year-end chart performance for "Came Back Haunted"
Chart (2013)	Position
US Hot Rock Songs (Billboard)	64
US Rock Airplay (Billboard)	36
