= Copy of a =

Nine Inch Nails song

"Copy of A"

Single by Nine Inch Nails

from the album Hesitation Marks
- Released: August 13, 2013
- Recorded: 2012–13
- Genre: Electronica; industrial; techno
- Length: 5:23
- Label: Columbia; The Null Corporation
- Songwriter: Trent Reznor
- Producers: Alan Moulder; Trent Reznor; Atticus Ross

Nine Inch Nails singles chronology
"Came Back Haunted" (2013)	"Copy of A" (2013)	"Everything" (2013)

"Copy of A" (stylized as 'Copy of a') is a song by American industrial rock band Nine Inch Nails, released as the second single from their eighth studio album, Hesitation Marks (2013). It was originally released as a free digital download on Amazon in the United States and the United Kingdom for a limited time starting on August 13, 2013. On August 20, the song was made available on the iTunes Store. It was also made available to those who had pre-ordered the album from Nine Inch Nails' official online store, together with "Came Back Haunted" in a zip file labeled "Hesitation Marks Singles".

The song was played live in concert for the first time about two weeks before the official studio track was released.

== Composition ==
The song features the use of a Swarmatron, an analogue synthesizer which was most notably used by Trent Reznor and Atticus Ross for the soundtrack of the 2010 film The Social Network. Reznor's singing on the track uses both the minor and the acoustic scales.

== Critical reception ==
When referring to the song, Marc Hogan of Spin magazine stated that "the concept of 'a copy of a copy' is somewhat quaint in a time when digital files can be copied limitlessly without any discernible drop in quality". He also described the drum machine in the song as "crisp" and the synths as "jittery", while noting the "overlapping vocals and smeared tendrils of fuzzy noise". Andrew Trendell of Gigwise described the song as "an epic, sprawling and typically NIN number that features a gradual and repetitive trancey build-up with a dark intensity before an almighty rock crescendo". He also interpreted the song's lyrical theme as "a struggle for identity". Triple M inferred from the song that Reznor "stays true to his roots while trying something different". Similarly, Forrest Wickman of Slate magazine stated that "the song is an update on an old NIN sound", while speculating on the possible muse on the postmodern condition or Fight Club on the lyrics. He also praised the musical beats by Atticus Ross and Alan Moulder and the use of Swarmatron. This Is Fake DIY also referred the song "as a punchy electronic piece, suitably harsh on the senses". Fact magazine described the song as "an urgently paced but slow-building chiller constructed from ice-cold techno arpeggiations and droning synths", while Katie Hasty of Hitfix remarked positively on the track's mellow vocals. She also praised the effect of looping sampler and itchy beat, contrasting it with the features of the previous single, "Came Back Haunted".

== In popular culture ==
"Copy of A" was featured in the soundtrack of the video game FIFA 14.

In 2014, humorist Freddy Scott wrote and performed a song about Reznor's musical style, "This Is A Trent Reznor Song", whose tune is based on "Copy of A"; Spin referred to it as "the copy that [...] 'Copy of A' never knew it always needed."

== Personnel ==
- Trent Reznor – vocals, electronics, percussion, guitar, production
- Lindsey Buckingham – guitar
- Pino Palladino – bass
- Ilan Rubin – tom drum
- Atticus Ross – production
- Alan Moulder – production
