= Broken (Nine Inch Nails EP) =

EP by Nine Inch Nails
- Released: September 22, 1992
- Recorded: March - August 1992
- Studios: Hell (New Orleans); Royal Recorders (Lake Geneva, Wisconsin); South Beach (Miami Beach, Florida); The Village (Los Angeles, California); A&M (Hollywood, California); Le Pig (Benedict Canyon, California)
- Genre: Industrial metal
- Length: 31:35
- Labels: Nothing; TVT; Interscope
- Producers: Trent Reznor; Flood

Nine Inch Nails chronology
Pretty Hate Machine (1989)	Broken (1992)	Fixed (1992)

Halo numbers chronology
Halo 4 (1990)	Halo 5 (1992)	Halo 6 (1992)

Broken is the first EP and second major release by the American industrial rock band Nine Inch Nails. It was released on September 22, 1992, by Nothing, TVT, and Interscope Records. The EP was produced by frontman Trent Reznor and Flood.

The release consists entirely of new material and replaces the synth-pop style of the band's 1989 debut album Pretty Hate Machine with a considerably heavier sound that would act as a precursor to their second album The Downward Spiral (1994). Its lyrical themes are in line with those of their succeeding work. The record was promoted with music videos for five of the eight songs which were censored due to their violent content, as well as a short film of the same name, which was never officially released, but was later leaked as a bootleg.

Broken received positive reviews from critics and reached No. 7 on the Billboard 200 chart, eventually receiving a platinum certification from the Recording Industry Association of America (RIAA). The recording helped to propel Nine Inch Nails into mainstream popularity, and later received two Grammy Awards (both for Best Metal Performance) for the songs "Wish" and "Happiness in Slavery".

== Background ==
After the commercial and critical success of Pretty Hate Machine (1989), TVT Records, the first record label to sign the band, pressured Trent Reznor to record a very similar album in the hope that it would have similarly successful singles. Steve Gottlieb, the CEO of TVT Records, was insistent that he would not release anything other than an album very similar to Pretty Hate Machine. Reznor demanded his label terminate his contract, due to their restriction of his creative control of the Nine Inch Nails project. They ignored his plea.

Reznor then objected to the label's attempted interference with his intellectual property. This much-publicized feud with TVT led Reznor to use a variety of monikers for the production of his next studio release. Reznor later said that he hated TVT, in part due to their classification of Nine Inch Nails as a synth-pop band. He reached a deal with the record label Interscope Records:

We made it very clear we were not doing another record for TVT. But they made it pretty clear they weren't ready to sell. So I felt like, well, I've finally got this thing going but it's dead. Flood and I had to record Broken under a different band name, because if TVT found out we were recording, they could confiscate all our shit and release it. Jimmy Iovine got involved with Interscope, and we kind of got slave-traded. It wasn't my doing. I didn't know anything about Interscope. And I was real pissed off at him at first because it was going from one bad situation to potentially another one. But Interscope went into it like they really wanted to know what I wanted. It was good, after I put my raving lunatic act on.

== Recording ==
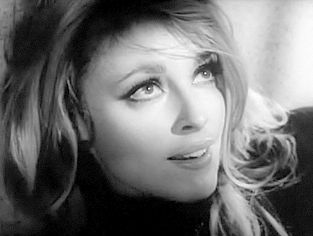
Reznor bought the house where actress Sharon Tate (pictured in 1966) was murdered, where he set up a recording studio that he named Le Pig. (Note: The place was formerly named 10050 Cielo Drive; Tate was murdered by the Manson family in that location.) He recorded both Broken and The Downward Spiral in the house.

After July 1992, Trent Reznor used as a recording studio the location 10050 Cielo Drive in Benedict Canyon, Los Angeles, where American actress Sharon Tate was murdered by the Manson family in 1969. Reznor renamed the location as "Le Pig" where he set up a recording studio to record the tracks of Broken and Nine Inch Nails' second studio album, The Downward Spiral (1994). In December 1993, Reznor was confronted by Patti Tate, who asked if he was exploiting her sister's death in the house. He later recalled this encounter during a 1997 interview with Rolling Stone:

While I was working on [The] Downward Spiral, I was living in the house where Sharon Tate was killed. Then one day I met her sister [Patti Tate]. It was a random thing, just a brief encounter. And she said: 'Are you exploiting my sister's death by living in her house?' For the first time, the whole thing kind of slapped me in the face. I said, 'No, it's just sort of my own interest in American folklore. I'm in this place where a weird part of history occurred.' I guess it never really struck me before, but it did then. She lost her sister from a senseless, ignorant situation that I don't want to support. When she was talking to me, I realized for the first time, 'What if it was my sister?' I thought, 'Fuck Charlie Manson.' I went home and cried that night. It made me see there's another side to things, you know?

Reznor secretly made Broken without an official title and while working under various pseudonyms to avoid record company interference. The record underwent development at six different studios, Hell (New Orleans, Louisiana), Royal Recorders at Lake Geneva, Wisconsin, South Beach Studios at Miami, Florida; Village Recorder and A&M Studios at Los Angeles, California, and Le Pig at Beverly Hills, California. The last two studios were later used during the production process for The Downward Spiral (1994). Tom Baker mastered the EP at Futuredisc. Following this step, Reznor presented the recording to Interscope Records in September 1992, and signed to the record label, making Broken Nine Inch Nails' major label debut.

English record producer Flood, who produced the first two tracks on Pretty Hate Machine returned to work in 1992 on the EP for "Wish", "Last" and "Gave Up". As Reznor explained in retrospect: "Broken [...] had a lot of the super-thick chunk sound, and almost every guitar sound on that record was [tapes consisting of] me playing through an old Zoom pedal and then going direct into Digidesign's TurboSynth [software in a Macintosh computer]. Then I used a couple of key ingredients to make it [be heard as being] unlike any 'real' sound."

The instrumental break of "Physical" (at 3:49) features a half-speed recording of barking by Reznor's dog Maise, barking and biting recording engineer Sean Beavan, who exclaimed "Ow!...fucker!". Maise was credited with "barks and roars" in the liner notes as a result. After being owned by Reznor for over three years, Maise died after falling from a three-story balcony during the Self Destruct Tour.

== Music and lyrics ==
Heavier than Pretty Hate Machine, Broken takes influences from industrial metal bands such as Ministry and Skinny Puppy. There are louder mixes and more distortion on every instrument, including John Lennon's Mellotron MKII heard most particularly on "Gave Up". Reznor said he wanted the album to be "an ultra-fast chunk of death" for the listener, something that would "make your ears a little scratchy". In the liner notes, Reznor credited the 1991 Nine Inch Nails touring band as an influence on the EP's sound.

Reznor explained: "Pretty Hate Machine was written from the point of view of someone who felt that the world may suck, but I like myself as a person and I can fight my way out of this bullshit. Broken introduced self-loathing, which is not a popular topic with anybody, especially in a song." The lyrics are a critique of society, the majority of its themes involving angst, control and dependency struggles. The second promotional single from the EP, "Wish", includes the expletive "fuck" thrice, used on the lines "Now there's nothing more fucked up I could do", "I'm the one without this soul, I'm the one with this big fucking hole" and "Gotta listen to your big time hard line bad luck fist fuck." Clocking at roughly one minute, "Pinion" is one of the shortest Nine Inch Nails songs. It features a series of short, ascending, distorted guitar power chords and a collage of atmospheric loops, including a reversed sample of David Bowie's "It's No Game" (which is not credited in the artwork for Broken). A portion of this is used as one of the guitar riffs in "Wish", one of the two promotional singles released from the album. "Help Me I Am in Hell", another instrumental, ends with another uncredited sample, this time from The Empire Strikes Back (1980). There are two bonus songs, which follow 91 silent, one-second tracks (numbered 7 through 97) on most CD copies, but were included as a separate 3" CD or 7" record with early pressings. "Physical" is a cover of the Adam and the Ants song "Physical (You're So)", originally released on the Kings of the Wild Frontier LP. "Suck" was written by Pigface, whose ever-changing lineup once included Reznor.

== Packaging and artwork ==
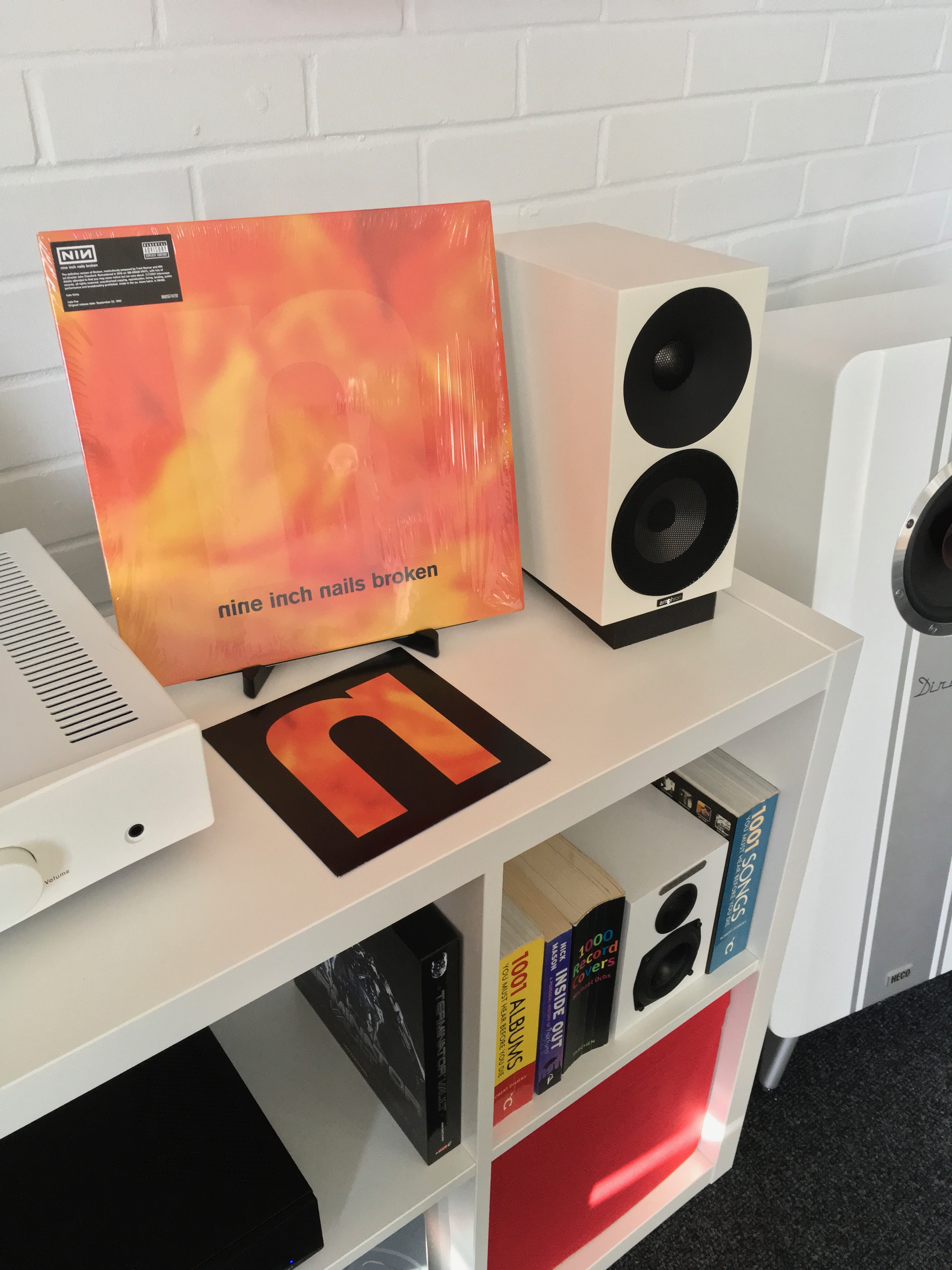
A vinyl reissue of Broken, along with its flyer, pictured in 2018

Broken was originally packaged in a trifold-out digipak, containing the six tracks on a regular compact disc and an additional three-inch mini CD with the two remaining songs, covers of Adam and the Ants' "Physical" and Pigface's "Suck". Due to the high cost of producing a two-disc EP, only 250,000 copies were released with the mini CD, subsequently Broken was re-released as one CD in October 1992, having the bonus songs heard on tracks 98 and 99 respectively, without any visual notice except for the credits, and tracks 7–97 each containing one second of silence. The cassette release featured tracks 1–6 on side one, with "Physical" and "Suck" appearing at the tail end of side two, after approximately 15 minutes of silence. The United Kingdom vinyl release was pressed onto a one sided 12" that featured the six main tracks. The two bonus cuts were issued on a 7-inch single given away inside the EP in a white die-cut sleeve (an unusual method for packaging an album on the vinyl format).

All copies include the logo of Nothing Records, a first for the works of Reznor, making the EP itself Nothing's first release. The vanity label was founded by Reznor along with John Malm Jr., who was his manager at the time, when he had involvement in a feud with TVT Records. It had a short lifespan (Nothing Records existed for nearly 15 years); the label was created in 1992, as Reznor signed to Interscope before TVT entered into a joint venture with that major record label, where he mailed parts culled from his publishing rights to TVT Music, in exchange for the freedom of having his own imprint.

The influence of Reznor's conflict with his former label, TVT, is evident in multiple aspects of the EP. After a long list of credits, the packaging reads, "no thanks: you know who you fucking are" followed by "the slave thinks he is released from bondage only to find a stronger set of chains." These comments are likely directed towards TVT Records' Steve Gottlieb, who refused to let Reznor out of his contract, sparking legal battles between the two parties. The "no thanks" part may be a reference to the liner notes of Ministry's Psalm 69: The Way to Succeed and the Way to Suck Eggs album, which featured a cryptic "no thanks, you know who you are." Aurally, at the beginning of "Physical", Reznor whispers, "eat your heart out, Steve." Visually, in a music video for "Gave Up", the monitor of a Mac computer running Pro Tools reads "fuck you steve".

Despite the addition of "no thanks: you know who you fucking are", there is a "Thank You" section. People listed in that portion include Jimmy Iovine, Ros Earles, Island Records, Eric Greenspan, Rick Rubin, Joe Mcewen, Seymour Stein, Susie Tallman, Mark O'Shea, Ian Copeland, Kevin Westenberg and Sheroa Rees-Davies.

The writing credit for "Suck" caused a minor controversy. While Pigface albums list all contributors to each of the songs, in this case, "Atkins/Rieflin/Barker/Reznor" as listed on Gub, the credit on Broken states "written by t. reznor/pigface". On the later Pigface release, Truth Will Out, the writing credit for the song is: "whatever trent says – really – no shit".

== Release and reception ==
Professional ratings
Review scores
Source	Rating
AllMusic	4.5/5 stars
Christgau's Consumer Guide	(neither)
Entertainment Weekly	B
Los Angeles Times	2.5/4 stars
NME	7/10
Pitchfork	7.6/10
Q	3/5 stars
Rolling Stone	4/5 stars
Select	5/5
Sputnikmusic	4/5

"It's heavy", wrote Danny Scott in Select, "it's loud and it'll rip your stinkin' head from your shoulders if you so much as breathe without permission." "Beats are hammered home with the gleeful force of a dentist's drill", said Peter Kane in Q, "while layers of rabid guitars and Reznor's spiteful voice pile on the nihilistic agony." "Reznor has shaken off the shackles of influence", observed NME, "and found his own suitably idiosyncratic niche." "Like a harrowing rape account", marveled Making Music, "it's an intensely vicious and shocking 30 minutes."

Option magazine attributed the EP's rockier sound to the long time Nine Inch Nails had spent on tour, and said, "the standard issue metal retread of Adam Ant's "Physical," a "bonus track," is a buzzing bore, but the rest of this stuff displays the dynamics and fierce melodicism that made Pretty Hate Machine so huge." Writing for The Baltimore Sun, J. D. Considine opined: "Harder than Ministry, hookier than Nitzer Ebb, this EP is everything industrial music should be." CMJ described Broken as "an astonishingly cold, brutal and bleak EP." The Tampa Bay Times called it "the aural equivalent of having your head stomped in at a biker bar."

"He's a one-man band in a genre known for its collaborative spirit, a huge success with one album instead of the requisite three, and an autocrat in an industry that abhors them. At times, Broken comes across like a child sticking his fingers in his ears and singing to avoid what he doesn't want to hear, but what the hell. Chin up, Trent. Keep making noise and maybe you can drown it out for the rest of us, too."

— Karen Woods, The Rocket.

The EP was certified platinum by the Recording Industry Association of America (RIAA) on December 18, 1992, despite a complete absence of touring in support of it. The first promotional single, "Happiness in Slavery", received moderate airplay, but its video's depiction of Bob Flanagan being pleasured, tortured, and killed on a device led to MTV banning it outright. This stunted the single's growth, but the track "Wish" was much more successful with an aggressive live performance on the music video, then later winning a Grammy for Best Metal Performance. Reznor later quipped that he wanted his gravestone to read "Reznor: Died. Said 'Fist Fuck', Won a Grammy."

== The Broken Movie ==
Not long after the EP's release, a short horror musical film also named Broken was created during and after the production of the EP. It was rumored to be a snuff film with all of its songs with the exception of "Last", "Physical", and "Suck" playing to a scene. This film was directed by Peter Christopherson of Throbbing Gristle and Coil fame. A music video for "Gave Up" would prove to be part of the film, as well as the videos for "Happiness in Slavery" and "Wish". The film is generally credited to be directed by Christopherson, although the music videos themselves were directed by various other people: "Pinion" and "Help Me I Am in Hell" is credited to Eric Goode and Serge Becker, while "Happiness in Slavery" is credited to Jon Reiss. The music video for "Happiness in Slavery" was universally banned, though a few attempts to air it were successful. An episode of Raw Time aired "Happiness in Slavery" at 3:00 AM to unanimously positive response from viewers. Another program, Music Link, broadcast the video at midnight.

Broken has not been given an official commercial release (according to Reznor, because they wanted to avoid the film overshadowing the prominence of the music), thus adding to its mythological status in alternative culture. Reznor, commenting in the "Access" section of the NIN website, implied that Gibby Haynes was responsible for the most prominent leak.

On December 30, 2006, an unofficial version of the film was released on a DVD disc image and distributed via BitTorrent at The Pirate Bay by the same anonymous user called "seed0" who uploaded the leaked DVD version of Closure. The DVD image represents a significant upgrade in visual and audio quality from "Broken 2.0.", and includes the oft-missing video for "Help Me I Am in Hell". Fans have speculated that this version of the film has been sourced directly from the master tapes, and that Reznor himself may have been the source of this leak along with the Closure DVD leak, as implied by a post on his official blog: "12/21/06 : Happy Holidays! This one is a guilt-free download. (shhhh - I didn't say that out loud). If you know what I'm talking about, cool."

== Track listing ==
All tracks are written by Trent Reznor, except where noted.

Broken track listing
No.	Title	Writer(s)	Length
1.	"Pinion" (instrumental)		1:02
2.	"Wish"		3:47
3.	"Last"		4:44
4.	"Help Me I Am in Hell" (instrumental)		1:56
5.	"Happiness in Slavery"		5:21
6.	"Gave Up"		4:08
7.	"Physical" (Adam and the Ants cover)	Adam Ant	5:30
8.	"Suck" (Pigface cover)	Reznor, Pigface (Note: Pigface's original version was credited to Martin Atkins, Bill Rieflin, Paul Barker and Reznor on the liner notes of Gub (1991).)	5:07
Total length:			31:35

Notes A few variations of Broken exist, mostly due to different track listing arrangements:

- The very first US CD pressings of the album had "Physical" and "Suck" included on a second disc, a three-inch mini CD. Many pressings outside the US had no second disc and these songs were tracks 7 and 8 on the main disc. Later American pressings eliminated the second disc as well and included the songs on the main disc as tracks 98 and 99. On this version tracks 7–97 consist of 1 second of silence each resulting in a slightly longer total playtime (33:09 vs. 31:35).
- On most pressings, US and otherwise, tracks 7/98 and 8/99 are not listed in the track listing on the back of the case. Some pressings also omit track 6, "Gave Up" from the rear listing as well.
- The only US 12-inch vinyl pressings released prior to the 2017 Definitive Edition ("promotional" only) omit the two instrumental tracks, "Pinion" and "Help Me I Am in Hell".
- Unlike the relatively large number of various CD versions, almost all cassette pressings across all regions include tracks 1–6 on side A and tracks 7–8 on side B.
- All vinyl pressings include "Physical" and "Suck" on a separate seven-inch disc.

== Personnel ==
Personnel taken from the CD booklet for Broken.

- Trent Reznor – performance, production
- Flood – production (2, 3, 6)
- Brian Liesegang – assistant
- Sean Beavan – assistant
- Chris Vrenna – assistant; drums (6)
- Paul Kendall – additional engineer
- Bill Kennedy – additional engineer
- Leo Herrara – additional engineer
- John "Genghis" Aguto – additional engineer
- Mike Baumgartner – additional engineer
- Martin Brumbach – additional engineer
- Martin Atkins – drums (2, 8)
- Maise – "barks and roars"
- Tom Baker – mastering
- Gary Talpas – sleeve design and photography

== Charts ==
Chart performance for Broken
Chart (1992–1993)	Peak position
Australian Albums (ARIA)	115
New Zealand (Recorded Music NZ)	49
UK Albums (Official Charts)	18
US Billboard 200	7

== Certifications ==
Certifications for Broken
Region	Certification	Certified units/sales
Canada (Music Canada)	Platinum	100,000^{^}
United States (RIAA)	Platinum	1,000,000^{^}
^{^} Shipments figures based on certification alone.
