= Self Destruct Tour =

1994–1996 concert tour by Nine Inch Nails

Self Destruct
- Tour by Nine Inch Nails
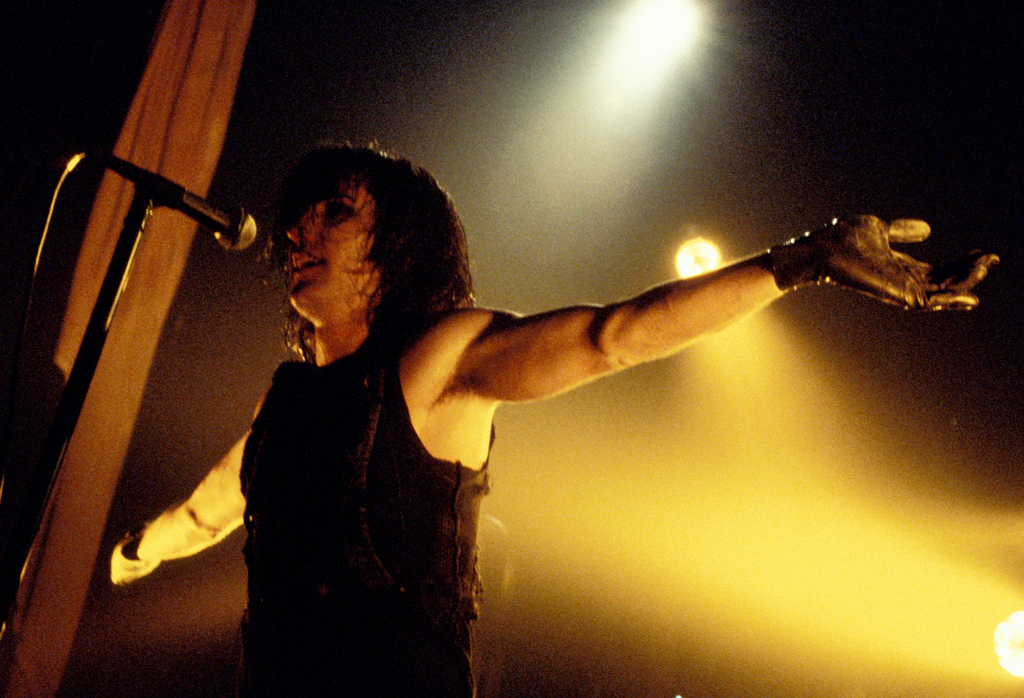
- Trent Reznor performing on the Self-Destruct Tour, c. 1994–95
- Location: North America; Europe
- Associated album: The Downward Spiral
- Start date: March 9, 1994
- End date: September 8, 1996
- Legs: 8

Nine Inch Nails concert chronology
- Pretty Hate Machine Tour Series (1988–91); Self-Destruct Tour (1994–96); Fragility Tour (1999–2000)

The Self Destruct Tour was a concert tour in support of industrial rock band Nine Inch Nails' album The Downward Spiral, which took place in early 1994, running until mid-1996, and was broken into eight legs.

== Overview ==
The tour was filmed for the Closure documentary that documented live performances as well as the band from 1989 to 1991. The second tape in the set – issued in late 1997 – featured the band's music videos. A DVD version, was planned for 2005. However, licensing issues forced an indefinite delay. An alleged "prototype" of the DVDs eventually leaked to torrent websites in 2006. This release has been attributed to Trent Reznor himself.

This was Nine Inch Nails' first tour since the early 1990s shows for Pretty Hate Machine. During this time, NIN's music became angrier and more aggressive via Broken and The Downward Spiral, which led to the concerts being often violent and personal, with band members injuring themselves. The stage set consisted of grungy curtains that would fall for visuals during songs such as 'Hurt', or rise during more aggressive songs. The back of the stage was littered with darker and standing lights, with very few conventional lights.

Reznor overhauled the band lineup and image for the tour. Robin Finck and Danny Lohner joined to play guitar and bass guitar, respectively. Chris Vrenna and James Woolley were brought back from the Pretty Hate Machine Tour Series. Image-wise, instead of the sloppy, low-budget style for previous tours, the band often dressed in black leather smothered in cornstarch, with members often changing their hairstyles radically for every concert. Finck used makeup to hide his eyebrows, and Reznor would don 'fishnet gloves' (as they would come to be known) for the show. The showy yet intense style earned comparisons to David Bowie, of whom Reznor was a fan. Later in the tour, Reznor's protégé Marilyn Manson would often join the frontman on stage to sing their songs—as evidenced in the Closure documentary.

The tour included a set at Woodstock '94 broadcast on pay-per-view and seen in as many as 24 million homes. The band being covered in mud was a result of pre-concert backstage play, contrary to the belief that it was an attention-grabbing ploy, thus making it difficult for Reznor to navigate the stage: Reznor pushed Lohner into the mud pit as the concert began and saw mud from his hair going into his eyes while performing. NIN was widely proclaimed to have "stolen the show" from its popular contemporaries, mostly classic rock bands, and its fan base expanded. The band received considerable mainstream success thereafter, performing with significantly higher production values and the addition of various theatrical visual elements. Its performance of "Happiness in Slavery" from the Woodstock concert earned the group a Grammy Award for Best Metal Performance in 1995. Entertainment Weekly commented about the band's Woodstock '94 performance: "Reznor unstrings rock to its horrifying, melodramatic core--an experience as draining as it is exhilarating". Despite this acclaim, Reznor attributed his dislike of the concert to its technical difficulties.

The main leg of the tour featured Marilyn Manson as the supporting act. Bassist Jeordie White – then playing under the pseudonym "Twiggy Ramirez" – later played bass with NIN from 2005 to 2007. After another tour leg supporting the remix album Further Down the Spiral, NIN contributed to the Alternative Nation Festival in Australia and subsequently embarked on the Dissonance Tour, which included 26 performances with co-headliner David Bowie. NIN opened the shows, their set transitioning into Bowie's set with joint performances of both bands' songs. However, the audiences reportedly did not respond positively, owing to the acts' differences.

The tour concluded with "Nights of Nothing": a three-night showcase of performances from Nothing Records bands Marilyn Manson, Prick, Meat Beat Manifesto, and Pop Will Eat Itself, then an 80-minute set by NIN. Kerrang! described the NIN set as "tight, brash and dramatic", but was disappointed at the lack of new material. On the second of the three nights, Richard Patrick was briefly reunited with the band and contributed guitar to a performance of "Head Like a Hole". After the Self Destruct tour, Chris Vrenna, member of the live band since 1988 and frequent contributor to Nine Inch Nails studio recordings, left the act permanently to pursue a career in producing and to form Tweaker.

"On a lot of that tour, I don't even remember playing the shows," Reznor sighed in 1999. "I got off the bus after two years going, 'Who am I?' That tour was really about excess… We were all drug addicts and full-on party machines, and that was one of the factors that led to me being in a very depressed state at the end."

== Personnel ==
- Trent Reznor – lead vocals, guitar, keyboards, synthesizers, bass
- Robin Finck – guitar, keyboards, synthesizers, backing vocals
- Danny Lohner – bass, guitar, keyboards, backing vocals
- Chris Vrenna – drums
- James Woolley – keyboards, synthesizers programming, backup vocals (March 9, 1994 – December 11, 1994)
- Charlie Clouser – keyboards, synthesizers, programming, backup vocals (December 28, 1994 – September 8, 1996)

== Warm-up leg ==
=== Typical set list ===
1. "Pinion"
2. "Terrible Lie"
3. "Sin"
4. "March of the Pigs"
5. "Piggy"
6. "Reptile"
7. "Wish"
8. "Ruiner"
9. "Suck"
10. "Happiness in Slavery"
11. "The Only Time"
12. "Get Down, Make Love"
13. "Down in It"
14. "Head Like a Hole"

"Heresy" made its live debut at Las Vegas, on March 14.

=== Tour dates ===
Date	City	Country	Venue
March 9, 1994	Los Angeles	United States	Helter Skelter
March 10, 1994	San Francisco	United States	Temple Oasis
March 11, 1994	Palo Alto	United States	The Edge
March 14, 1994	Las Vegas	United States	Huntridge Theater
March 15, 1994	Las Vegas	United States	Huntridge Theater
March 17, 1994	Phoenix	United States	The Roxy
March 18, 1994	Phoenix	United States	The Roxy
March 20, 1994	Tucson	United States	Buena Vista Theater
March 26, 1994	Honolulu	United States	After Dark
March 27, 1994	Honolulu	United States	After Dark

== North American & Europe leg ==
Reeling from the success of Pretty Hate Machine and Broken as well as the band's departure from TVT Records, the nearly immediate success of The Downward Spiral led to Nine Inch Nails playing larger venues. This debuted the band's new grungy and messy image in which band members would often come out in ragged clothes slathered in corn starch. They would often destroy their instruments at the end of concerts, attack each other, and stage-dive into the crowd. This led to Nine Inch Nails's notoriety as a live act. The shows often consisted of songs from Pretty Hate Machine, Broken, The Downward Spiral, as well as songs such as "Get Down Make Love" and "Dead Souls", which were formerly staples of their live show.

=== Typical set list ===
1. "Pinion"
2. "Terrible Lie"
3. "Sin"
4. "March of the Pigs"
5. "Something I Can Never Have"
6. "Closer"
7. "Reptile"
8. "Wish"
9. "Suck"
10. "The Only Time"
11. "Get Down, Make Love"
12. "Down in It"
13. "Big Man with a Gun"
14. "Head Like a Hole"
15. "Dead Souls"
16. "Help Me I Am in Hell"
17. "Happiness in Slavery"

"Burn" made its live debut on the second to last show of the tour.

=== Support act ===
- Die Krupps
- Fem2Fem
- Marilyn Manson
- PIG
- Treponem Pal
- Type O Negative

=== Tour dates ===
Date	City	Country	Venue
April 19, 1994	Seattle	United States	Moore Theatre
April 20, 1994	Seattle	United States	Moore Theatre
April 21, 1994	Portland	United States	La Luna
April 23, 1994	San Francisco	United States	The Warfield
April 24, 1994	San Francisco	United States	The Warfield
April 26, 1994	Los Angeles	United States	Palace Nightclub
April 27, 1994	Los Angeles	United States	Palace Nightclub
April 28, 1994	Los Angeles	United States	Palace Nightclub
April 30, 1994	San Diego	United States	Montezuma Hall
May 1, 1994	Mesa	United States	Centennial Hall
May 3, 1994	Dallas	United States	The Bomb Factory
May 4, 1994	Houston	United States	International Ballroom
May 5, 1994	New Orleans	United States	State Palace Theatre
May 7, 1994	Chicago	United States	Riviera Theatre
May 8, 1994	Detroit	United States	State Theatre
May 9, 1994	Cleveland	United States	Agora Theater
May 11, 1994	Boston	United States	Cyclorama Building
May 13, 1994	New York City	United States	Webster Hall
May 14, 1994	New York City	United States	Roseland Ballroom
May 15, 1994	Upper Darby	United States	Tower Theater
May 18, 1994	Dublin	Ireland	SFX Hall
May 20, 1994	Wolverhampton	United Kingdom	Civic Hall
May 21, 1994	Glasgow	United Kingdom	Barrowland Ballroom
May 22, 1994	Manchester	United Kingdom	Manchester Academy
May 24, 1994	London	United Kingdom	The Forum
May 25, 1994	London	United Kingdom	The Forum
May 26, 1994	London	United Kingdom	The Forum
May 28, 1994	Ghent	Belgium	Vooruit Concert Hall
May 30, 1994	Paris	France	Bataclan
May 31, 1994	Amsterdam	Netherlands	Paradiso
June 2, 1994	Frankfurt	Germany	Live Music Hall
June 3, 1994	Berlin	Germany	Huxley's Neue Welt
June 7, 1994	Hamburg	Germany	Docks
June 8, 1994	Düsseldorf	Germany	Tor 3
June 9, 1994	Munich	Germany	Charterhalle
June 11, 1994	Vienna	Austria	Arena
June 12, 1994	Prague	Czech Republic	Lucerna Great Hall
July 29, 1994	Atlanta	United States	Fox Theatre
July 30, 1994	Atlanta	United States	Fox Theatre
August 3, 1994	Poughkeepsie	United States	Mid-Hudson Civic Center
August 6, 1994	Barrie	Canada	Molson Park
August 11, 1994	Fairfax	United States	Patriot Center
August 13, 1994	Saugerties	United States	Woodstock '94

== North American leg #2 ==
An incident occurred at the tour's Delta Center stop on October 18, 1994, in Salt Lake City, Utah. Manson was prohibited from performing after the venue owner took offense to Manson's merchandise which included a band t-shirt with the satirical message, "Warning: Heavy Metal Music contains satanic messages that will KILL GOD in your impressionable teenage minds. As a result, you will be convinced to KILL YOUR MOM AND DAD, and eventually, in all act of hopeless, suicidal, 'rock and roll' behaviour, you will KILL YOURSELF. Please, burn your records while there is still hope." During Nine Inch Nail's set, Reznor invited Manson on stage who ripped apart a Book of Mormon then threw it into the audience asking, "Do you let Him [God] run your lives?"

"You can't explain this to people who weren't around it," recalled Reznor of this leg of the tour. "It's not sane, but imagine the kind of people who came to that show, and they're all trying to outdo each other. Some of the guys in the (Jim Rose) Circus have horns and a tail, and one of the guys was trying to have trepanation performed on him in my studio: drilling a hole in the back of the head so the spinal fluid leaks out and you're high forever. That's the level it was getting to… I'm going to point the finger at Jim Rose. The first time I was ever around him, I was eating a light bulb, thinking, 'What am I doing?'"

=== Typical set list ===
1. "Pinion"
2. "Mr. Self Destruct"
3. "Sin"
4. "March of the Pigs"
5. "Piggy"
6. "Reptile"
7. "Gave Up
8. "Happiness in Slavery"
9. "Eraser"
10. "Hurt"
11. "The Downward Spiral"
12. "Wish"
13. "Suck"
14. "The Only Time" or "Ruiner"
15. "Down in It"
16. "Head Like a Hole"
17. "Dead Souls"
18. "Closer"
19. "I Do Not Want This"
20. "Something I Can Never Have"

"Physical", "Get Down, Make Love" and "Terrible Lie" made a number of occasional appearances.

=== Support acts ===
- Hole
- Jim Rose Circus
- Marilyn Manson
- Melvins
- Pop Will Eat Itself

=== Tour dates ===
Date	City	Country	Venue
August 27, 1994	Rochester	United States	Auditorium Theatre
August 29, 1994	Cleveland	United States	Nautica Stage
August 30, 1994	Cleveland	United States	Nautica Stage
September 2, 1994	Detroit	United States	Pine Knob Music Theatre
September 3, 1994	Chicago	United States	UIC Pavilion
September 5, 1994	Saint Paul	United States	Roy Wilkins Auditorium
September 7, 1994	Milwaukee	United States	Riverside Theatre
September 10, 1994	Muncie	United States	Ball State Arena
September 11, 1994	St. Louis	United States	Fox Theatre
September 13, 1994	Nashville	United States	Memorial Gymnasium
September 14, 1994	Memphis	United States	North Hall Auditorium
September 16, 1994	Springfield	United States	Shrine Mosque
September 17, 1994	Kansas City	United States	Memorial Hall
September 19, 1994	Omaha	United States	Omaha Civic Auditorium
September 24, 1994	Seattle	United States	Seattle Center Arena
September 27, 1994	Vancouver	Canada	PNE Forum
September 30, 1994	Sacramento	United States	ARCO Arena
October 1, 1994	San Jose	United States	Event Center Arena
October 3, 1994	Los Angeles	United States	Universal Amphitheatre
October 4, 1994	Los Angeles	United States	Universal Amphitheatre
October 6, 1994	Los Angeles	United States	Universal Amphitheatre
October 7, 1994	Los Angeles	United States	Universal Amphitheatre
October 10, 1994	San Diego	United States	San Diego Sports Arena
October 11, 1994	Phoenix	United States	Arizona Veterans Memorial Coliseum
October 14, 1994	Oakland	United States	Henry J. Kaiser Convention Center
October 16, 1994	Las Vegas	United States	Thomas & Mack Center
October 18, 1994	Salt Lake City	United States	Delta Center
October 20, 1994	Denver	United States	McNichols Sports Arena
October 26, 1994	El Paso	United States	El Paso County Coliseum
October 28, 1994	Austin	United States	Frank Erwin Center
October 29, 1994	Dallas	United States	Fair Park Coliseum
October 31, 1994	Houston	United States	The Summit
November 2, 1994	Norman	United States	Lloyd Noble Center
November 3, 1994	Tulsa	United States	Expo Square Pavilion
November 5, 1994	Carbondale	United States	SIU Arena
November 6, 1994	Iowa City	United States	Carver–Hawkeye Arena
November 8, 1994	Madison	United States	Dane County Coliseum
November 9, 1994	Champaign	United States	Assembly Hall
November 12, 1994	Louisville	United States	Louisville Gardens
November 13, 1994	Columbus	United States	Battelle Hall
November 18, 1994	Jacksonville	United States	Jacksonville Coliseum
November 20, 1994	Miami	United States	Miami Arena
November 21, 1994	Tampa	United States	Expo Hall
November 23, 1994	Winston-Salem	United States	Lawrence Joel Veterans Memorial Coliseum
November 25, 1994	Hampton	United States	Hampton Coliseum
November 28, 1994	Pittsburgh	United States	Civic Arena
November 29, 1994	Buffalo	United States	Buffalo Memorial Auditorium
December 1, 1994	Toronto	Canada	Maple Leaf Gardens
December 3, 1994	Boston	United States	Boston Garden
December 4, 1994	Albany	United States	Knickerbocker Arena
December 6, 1994	Baltimore	United States	Baltimore Arena
December 8, 1994	New York City	United States	Madison Square Garden
December 9, 1994	New York City	United States	Madison Square Garden
December 11, 1994	Philadelphia	United States	CoreStates Spectrum
December 28, 1994	Cleveland	United States	Odeon Concert Club
December 29, 1994	Dayton	United States	Hara Arena
December 31, 1994	Auburn Hills	United States	The Palace of Auburn Hills
January 3, 1995	Montreal	Canada	Montreal Forum
January 5, 1995	Worcester	United States	Centrum in Worcester
January 6, 1995	Uniondale	United States	Nassau Coliseum
January 8, 1995	Cleveland	United States	CSU Convocation Center
January 9, 1995	Cleveland	United States	CSU Convocation Center
January 12, 1995	Kalamazoo	United States	Wings Stadium
January 13, 1995	Toledo	United States	Toledo Sports Arena
January 15, 1995	Chicago	United States	Rosemont Horizon
January 16, 1995	Chicago	United States	Rosemont Horizon
January 18, 1995	Milwaukee	United States	MECCA Arena
January 21, 1995	Indianapolis	United States	Pepsi Coliseum
January 22, 1995	Evansville	United States	Roberts Municipal Stadium
January 24, 1995	Atlanta	United States	The Omni
January 25, 1995	Columbia	United States	Carolina Coliseum
January 27, 1995	Orlando	United States	Orlando Arena
January 30, 1995	Murfreesboro	United States	Murphy Athletic Center
January 31, 1995	Little Rock	United States	Barton Coliseum
February 4, 1995	Minneapolis	United States	Target Center
February 5, 1995	La Crosse	United States	La Crosse Center
February 7, 1995	Sioux Falls	United States	Sioux Falls Arena
February 8, 1995	Topeka	United States	Kansas Expocentre
February 11, 1995	Dallas	United States	Fair Park Coliseum
February 13, 1995	Omaha	United States	Omaha Civic Auditorium
February 14, 1995	St. Louis	United States	Kiel Center
February 18, 1995	New Orleans	United States	UNO Lakefront Arena

== Oceania leg ==
The leg was a part of the Alternative Nation Festival.

=== Typical set list ===
1. "Pinion"
2. "Mr. Self Destruct"
3. "Sin"
4. "March of the Pigs"
5. "Piggy"
6. "Closer"
7. "Reptile"
8. "Gave Up
9. "Wish"
10. "Dead Souls"
11. "Help Me I Am in Hell"
12. "Happiness in Slavery"
13. "Head Like a Hole"

=== Tour dates ===
Date	City	Country	Venue
April 13, 1995	Brisbane	Australia	Chandler Sports Complex
April 15, 1995	Sydney	Australia	Eastern Creek Raceway
April 16, 1995	Melbourne	Australia	Olympic Park

== Dissonance leg ==
The band co-headlined with David Bowie on the North American leg on Bowie's Outside Tour in 1995.

=== Typical set list ===
1. "Terrible Lie"
2. "March of the Pigs"
3. "The Becoming"
4. "Sanctified"
5. "Piggy (Nothing Can Stop Me Now)"
6. "Burn"
7. "Closer" or "Closer To God"
8. "Wish"
9. "Gave Up"
10. "Down in It"
11. "Eraser" (Instrumental version)

Nine Inch Nails and David Bowie:

1. "Subterraneans"
2. "Scary Monsters"
3. "Reptile"
4. "Hallo Spaceboy"
5. "Hurt"

=== Tour dates ===
Date	City	Country	Venue
September 14, 1995	Hartford	United States	Meadows Music Theatre
September 16, 1995	Mansfield	United States	Great Woods Arts Center
September 17, 1995	Hershey	United States	Hersheypark Stadium
September 20, 1995	Toronto	Canada	SkyDome
September 22, 1995	Camden	United States	Blockbuster Center
September 23, 1995	Burgettstown	United States	Star Lake Amphitheater
September 27, 1995	East Rutherford	United States	Meadowlands Arena
September 28, 1995	East Rutherford	United States	Meadowlands Arena
September 30, 1995	Cuyahoga Falls	United States	Blossom Music Center
October 1, 1995	Tinley Park	United States	New World Music Theatre
October 3, 1995	Auburn Hills	United States	The Palace of Auburn Hills
October 4, 1995	Columbus	United States	Polaris Amphitheater
October 5, 1995	Bristow	United States	Nissan Pavilion
October 7, 1995	Raleigh	United States	Walnut Creek Amphitheatre
October 9, 1995	Atlanta	United States	Lakewood Amphitheatre
October 11, 1995	Maryland Heights	United States	Riverport Amphitheatre
October 13, 1995	Dallas	United States	Starplex Amphitheatre
October 14, 1995	Austin	United States	South Park Meadows
October 16, 1995	Denver	United States	McNichols Sports Arena
October 18, 1995	Phoenix	United States	Desert Sky Pavilion
October 19, 1995	Las Vegas	United States	Thomas & Mack Center
October 21, 1995	Mountain View	United States	Shoreline Amphitheatre
October 24, 1995	Tacoma	United States	Tacoma Dome
October 25, 1995	Portland	United States	The Rose Garden
October 28, 1995	Inglewood	United States	Great Western Forum
October 29, 1995	Inglewood	United States	Great Western Forum

== North American club leg ==
=== Typical set list ===
1. "Head Like a Hole"
2. "Terrible Lie"
3. "Mr. Self Destruct"
4. "March of the Pigs"
5. "Something I Can Never Have"
6. "Reptile"
7. "Suck"
8. "Get Down, Make Love"
9. "Piggy"
10. "Closer"
11. "Down in It"
12. "Wish"
13. "Gave Up"
14. "Happiness in Slavery"
15. "Sanctified"
16. "Dead Souls"

=== Tour dates ===
Date	City	Country	Venue
November 4, 1995	Houston	United States	Numbers
November 6, 1995	New Orleans	United States	House of Blues
November 10, 1995	Pensacola	United States	Bayfront Auditorium
November 11, 1995	St. Petersburg	United States	Jannus Landing
November 12, 1995	Orlando	United States	The Edge
November 13, 1995	Fort Lauderdale	United States	The Edge
November 15, 1995	Miami Beach	United States	Glam Slam
November 27, 1995	Corpus Christi	United States	Cantina Santa Fe

== Nights of Nothing leg ==
Nights of Nothing was an industry showcase organized by Reznor of his vanity label, Nothing Records', talent roster. It ran from August 30, 1996, to September 8, 1996, and spanned three shows. The shows featured performances by his band, Meat Beat Manifesto, Marilyn Manson, Filter and other "special guests."

=== Marilyn Manson incident ===
None of us wanted to play this Nothing Records showcase in the first place, and now I've inadvertently injured my drummer, nailing him with a microphone stand and landing him in the hospital. We had wanted to do a Marilyn Manson show to kick off the tour for Antichrist Superstar, but this turned into some sort of strange ego trip which I'm sure was just to make us look foolish. I'm going to go to sleep now and pretend like this didn't happen. This wasn't the beginning of the tour, it was one last favor.

— Marilyn Manson

Following the conclusion of the arduous recording sessions for Marilyn Manson's sophomore album Antichrist Superstar, acrimony between the band, Reznor, and Nothing Records was at its peak. The band nevertheless grudgingly agreed to fulfill their contractual obligation to promote the record a little over a month prior to its release by performing on the second evening of Nights of Nothing, at the Irving Plaza on September 5, 1996. While performing the final song of their five-song set, "1996", Manson picked up a weighted microphone stand and proceeded to smash the drumkit. Drummer Ginger Fish kept playing what remained of his disintegrating equipment until Manson accidentally struck him on the side of the head with the weighted base, sending him face first to the floor unconscious. Manson then walked offstage while the crowd looked on to see whether or not the drummer was alright. Fish managed to crawl a few inches before he collapsed and was carried away by road crew to the hospital. Fish's injury necessitated five stitches and a brief rumor spread the incident was a deliberate assault. Fish later recounted that had he not turned his head at the last moment the stand would have hit him directly in the face and said of the incident, "we just get a little carried away sometimes."

=== Typical set list ===
1. "Terrible Lie"
2. "March of the Pigs"
3. "Sanctified"
4. "Wish"
5. "Suck"
6. "Down in It"
7. "Animal" (Prick cover)
8. "Tough" (Prick cover)
9. "R.S.V.P." (Pop Will Eat Itself cover, with Clint Mansell)
10. "Wise Up! Sucker" (Pop Will Eat Itself cover, with Clint Mansell)
11. "Head Like a Hole"
12. "Something I Can Never Have"

"Dead Souls" was played at the Atlanta show.

=== Tour dates ===
Date	City	Country	Venue
August 30, 1996	New Orleans	United States	Jimmy's
September 5, 1996	New York City	United States	Irving Plaza
September 8, 1996	Atlanta	United States	The Masquerade

== Canceled and rescheduled dates ==
Date	City	Country	Venue
March 31, 1994	Melbourne	Australia	The Palace
April 1, 1994	Melbourne	Australia	The Palace
April 3, 1994	Adelaide	Australia	Heaven
April 5, 1994	Canberra	Australia	ANU Bar and Refectory
April 6, 1994	Wollongong	Australia	Waves
April 7, 1994	Newcastle	Australia	Newcastle Workers Club
April 9, 1994	Sydney	Australia	Selina's Coogee Bay Hotel
April 10, 1994	Brisbane	Australia	The Roxy
April 12, 1994	Auckland	New Zealand	The Powerstation
May 10, 1994	Toronto	Canada	Palladium
June 6, 1994	Stockholm	Sweden	Gino
November 15, 1994 (rescheduled for December 29)	Dayton	United States	Hara Arena
December 7, 1994 (rescheduled for December 8)	New York City	United States	Madison Square Garden
January 19, 1995	Moline	United States	The Mark of the Quad Cities
February 2, 1995	Lincoln	United States	Pershing Center
February 10, 1995	Lubbock	United States	South Plains Fair Park Coliseum
February 13, 1995	Columbia	United States	Hearnes Center
February 16, 1995	Pensacola	United States	Pensacola Civic Center
