= Fixed (EP) =

EP by Nine Inch Nails
- Released: December 7, 1992
- Studios: Matrix, London
- Genres: Industrial rock; noise
- Length: 40:23
- Labels: Nothing; TVT; Interscope
- Producer: Trent Reznor

Nine Inch Nails chronology
Broken (1992)	Fixed (1992)	The Downward Spiral (1994)

Halo numbers chronology
Halo 5 (1992)	Halo 6 (1992)	Halo 7 (1994)

Fixed is the second extended play (EP) by American industrial rock band Nine Inch Nails. It was released on December 7, 1992, by Nothing, TVT, and Interscope Records. It serves as a companion release to Broken (1992), and includes remixes by Coil, Danny Hyde, JG Thirlwell, and Butch Vig, as well as then-live band member Chris Vrenna.

Fixed charted in New Zealand and Canada in 1993 and was certified platinum by the British Phonographic Industry (BPI) on March 1, 1995.

== Background and content ==
"This recording contains various interpretations of songs that appear in their proper form on the Broken EP."

— Message on the back cover of Fixed.

According to Trent Reznor, Nine Inch Nails frontman and, at the time, sole member, Fixed was not intended to be a remix album, but instead a reinterpretation and deconstruction of the music found on the 1992 EP Broken, where the songs were in their "proper form".

"Happiness in Slavery" (remix)
This remix of "Happiness in Slavery" highlights the industrial, manipulated sound of Fixed.

After Reznor hired Peter Christopherson of Coil to direct the accompanying film to Broken, they developed a friendship. Shortly after, Reznor asked Christopherson to contribute to Fixed. JG Thirlwell and Butch Vig were also recruited for the remixing effort. Thirwell's second "Wish" remix, "Fist Fuck", features samples of Timothy Leary while the final track, "Screaming Slave", contains various samples of Bob Flanagan being tortured that were recorded during the filming of the "Happiness in Slavery" music video. Ultimately, Vig's contributions were minimal, relegated to the ending passage of "Throw This Away". About the experience, Vig said, "I started recording a lot of new parts, and took it in a much different direction. When it was finished, Trent thought the front part of the mix didn't fit the EP, so he just used the ending." Reznor and Chris Vrenna completed many of the remixes in-house.

Musically, Fixed is a dark, industrial, and noisy EP. Much of Broken's heavy metal aspects are eschewed and replaced with more beat- and drum-focused sounds. Tape manipulation, unusual noises, and a focus on grinding repetition define Fixed as a distinctly experimental release.

== Uncoiled and Recoiled ==
After Christopherson and John Balance, the two members of Coil who worked on Fixed, died, Danny Hyde released a number of outtakes from the remix EP, the "Closer to God" (1994) single, and the Further Down the Spiral (1995) remix album onto torrent websites. This initial leak was titled Uncoiled, and a later semi-official release through Cold Spring was called Recoiled. Both of these releases feature alternate mixes of "Gave Up" from Fixed.

== Critical reception ==
Professional ratings
Review scores
Source	Rating
AllMusic	4/5 stars
Vox	6/10

Writing in Vox magazine in 1993, John Harris said, "Most of Fixed sounds supremely accomplished and avant-garde, but this set of radical re-inventions is really only for people who've already spent hours listening to Broken." In a review of "essential" albums with Parental Advisory stickers, fellow Vox writer Stephen Dalton wrote of Fixed: "NIN suffer tense, nervous headaches and homicidal urges until Jim "Foetus" Thirlwell gives the manual relief which Julian Clary offered Norman Lamont." In his review of Fixed, AllMusic writer Peter J. D'Angelo said, "Even though Nine Inch Nails was thrust into the mainstream spotlight, this record shows the group returning to its roots and creating a daring new translation of songs that were pummeling from the start." D'Angelo concluded his review by writing that Fixed is "an impressive feat and a necessary counterpoint to an important record."

== Track listing ==
No.	Title	Remixer(s)	Length
1.	"Gave Up" (remix)	Coil; Danny Hyde	5:25
2.	"Wish" (remix)	JG Thirlwell	9:11
3.	"Happiness in Slavery" (remix)	Trent Reznor; Chris Vrenna; P.K.	6:09
4.	"Throw This Away" (remix of "Suck" and "Last")	Reznor; Vrenna; Butch Vig	4:14
5.	"Fist Fuck" (remix of "Wish")	Thirlwell	7:21
6.	"Screaming Slave" (remix of "Happiness in Slavery")	Reznor; Vrenna; Bill Kennedy; Sean Beavan; Martin Brumbach; Bob Flanagan	8:02
Total length:			40:23

== Personnel ==
Nine Inch Nails

- Trent Reznor – writing, performing, production, remixing (3, 4, 6)

Remixing personnel

- Peter Christopherson – remixing (1)
- John Balance – remixing (1)
- Danny Hyde – remixing (1)
- JG Thirlwell – remixing (2, 5)
- Paul Kendall – additional electronics (3)
- Chris Vrenna – remixing (3, 4, 6)
- Butch Vig – ending sequence (4)
- Bill Kennedy – remixing (6)
- Martin Brumbach – remixing (6)
- Sean Beavan – remixing (6)
- Bob Flanagan – remixing (6)

Additional personnel

- Gary Talpas – sleeve design, photography
- Tom Baker – mastering

== Charts ==
=== Weekly charts ===
Weekly chart performance for Fixed by Nine Inch Nails
Chart (1993)	Peak position
Canada (Nielsen SoundScan)	6
New Zealand (Recorded Music NZ)	25

=== Year-end charts ===
2001 year-end chart performance for Fixed by Nine Inch Nails
Chart (2001)	Position
Canada (Nielsen SoundScan)	41

2002 year-end chart performance for Fixed by Nine Inch Nails
Chart (2002)	Position
Canada (Nielsen SoundScan)	53

== Certifications ==
Certifications for Fixed by Nine Inch Nails
Region	Certification	Certified units/sales
United Kingdom (BPI)	Platinum	300,000^{^}
^{^} Shipments figures based on certification alone.
