= The Downward Spiral =

Studio album by Nine Inch Nails
- Released: March 8, 1994
- Recorded: 1992–1993
- Studios: Le Pig, Benedict Canyon; Record Plant, Los Angeles; A&M, Hollywood
- Genres: Industrial rock; alternative rock; industrial metal
- Length: 65:02
- Labels: Nothing; Interscope; Island (EU)
- Producers: Trent Reznor; Flood

Nine Inch Nails chronology
Fixed (1992)	The Downward Spiral (1994)	Further Down the Spiral (1995)

Nine Inch Nails studio album chronology
Pretty Hate Machine (1989)	The Downward Spiral (1994)	The Fragile (1999)

Halo numbers chronology
Halo 7 (1994)	Halo 8 (1994)	Halo 9 (1994)

Singles from The Downward Spiral
- 1. "March of the Pigs" Released: February 25, 1994; 2. "Closer" Released: May 1994

The Downward Spiral is the second studio album by the American industrial rock band Nine Inch Nails. It was released on March 8, 1994, by Nothing Records and Interscope Records in the United States and Island Records in Europe. Considered one of the most influential and emblematic works of the 1990s, this concept album chronicles the self-destructive descent of a misanthropic protagonist into madness, dehumanization, and suicide. Through a metaphorical "downward spiral", the album explores themes such as alienation, addiction, religion, violence, sex, power, depression, and the complete loss of control over oneself and one's surroundings.

The album was recorded primarily by Trent Reznor at the house where the Manson Family committed the Tate–LaBianca murders in 1969, which Reznor made into a home studio dubbed "Le Pig", a reference to the message written in blood on the door by the killers. At the time Reznor suffered from isolation, struggled with depression and drug addiction, and wanted to move away from the abrasive, direct sound of his previous EP, Broken (1992), toward something more textural, atmospheric, and cinematic. The album was influenced by David Bowie's Low and Pink Floyd's The Wall, and combined elements of industrial rock, techno, heavy metal, ambient, and electronica.

The production involved British producer Flood (who had previously worked on Pretty Hate Machine (1989) and Broken) engineer Alan Moulder on the final mix, drummer Chris Vrenna, and notable contributions from musicians such as Adrian Belew (formerly of King Crimson) on guitars and Stephen Perkins (of Jane's Addiction) on percussion. Reznor made extensive use of tools like Pro Tools, TurboSynth, Zoom 9030, Akai and Kurzweil samplers, and processed guitars and vocals into abstract and expressive textures, achieving a "full-range" sound that eschews conventional verse-chorus structures and embraces dissonance, industrial noise, and unusual time signature changes.

The album made a commercial impact despite its rawness. It debuted at number 2 on the Billboard 200, sold millions of copies (achieving quadruple Platinum in the US) and cemented Nine Inch Nails as a cultural phenomenon. However, it also attracted controversy: it was criticized by social conservatives for its graphic lyrics (as in "Big Man with a Gun") erroneously linked to events like the Columbine massacre, and sparked debates about censorship and artistic responsibility.

== Writing and recording ==
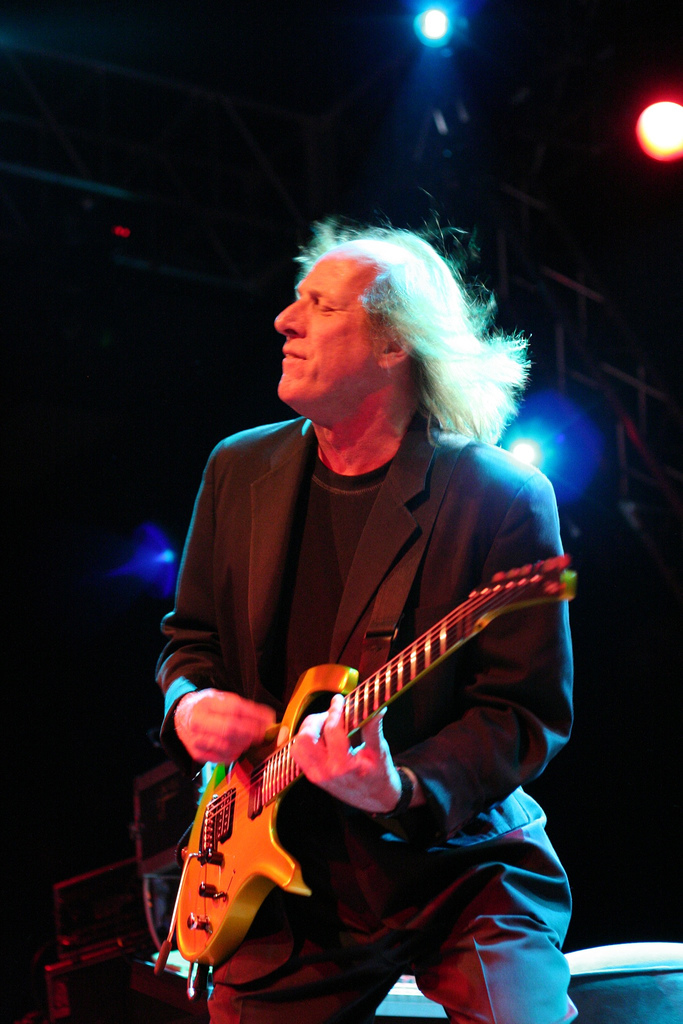
Adrian Belew in 2006. His approach to guitar parts on the album improved Reznor's confidence in the instrument.

Reznor conceived of The Downward Spiral after Nine Inch Nails' run in the lineup of the Lollapalooza festival tour, feeling increasingly alienated and uninterested. The band's concerts were known for their radical onstage dynamic in which members acted aggressively, injured themselves, destroyed instruments, and polluted stages. Reznor had begun to feud with TVT Records, resulting in him co-founding Nothing Records with his then-manager John Malm Jr. as a subsidiary of Interscope. Simultaneously, he began fleshing out the concept for The Downward Spiral, focusing on the life and death of a misanthropic man who rebels against humanity, and kills God before attempting suicide. Reznor frequently struggled with drug addiction and depression, and the themes of the album gradually allegorized his living situation. His peers at some point recommended him the antidepressant Prozac, but he declined to be medicated.

Reznor wanted the album's sound to diverge from the abrasion of Broken, emphasizing mood, texture, restraint and subtlety, although he was unsure about its musical direction. He decided to utilize "full range" sound, focusing on texture and space, and avoiding conventional usage of guitars or synthesizers with a recognizable sound palette. Subsequently, he mainly worked with a Macintosh computer, using music editor programs on the computer to distort frequencies in guitar and bass parts as a form of sound design, and creating collages of sounds with Pro Tools.

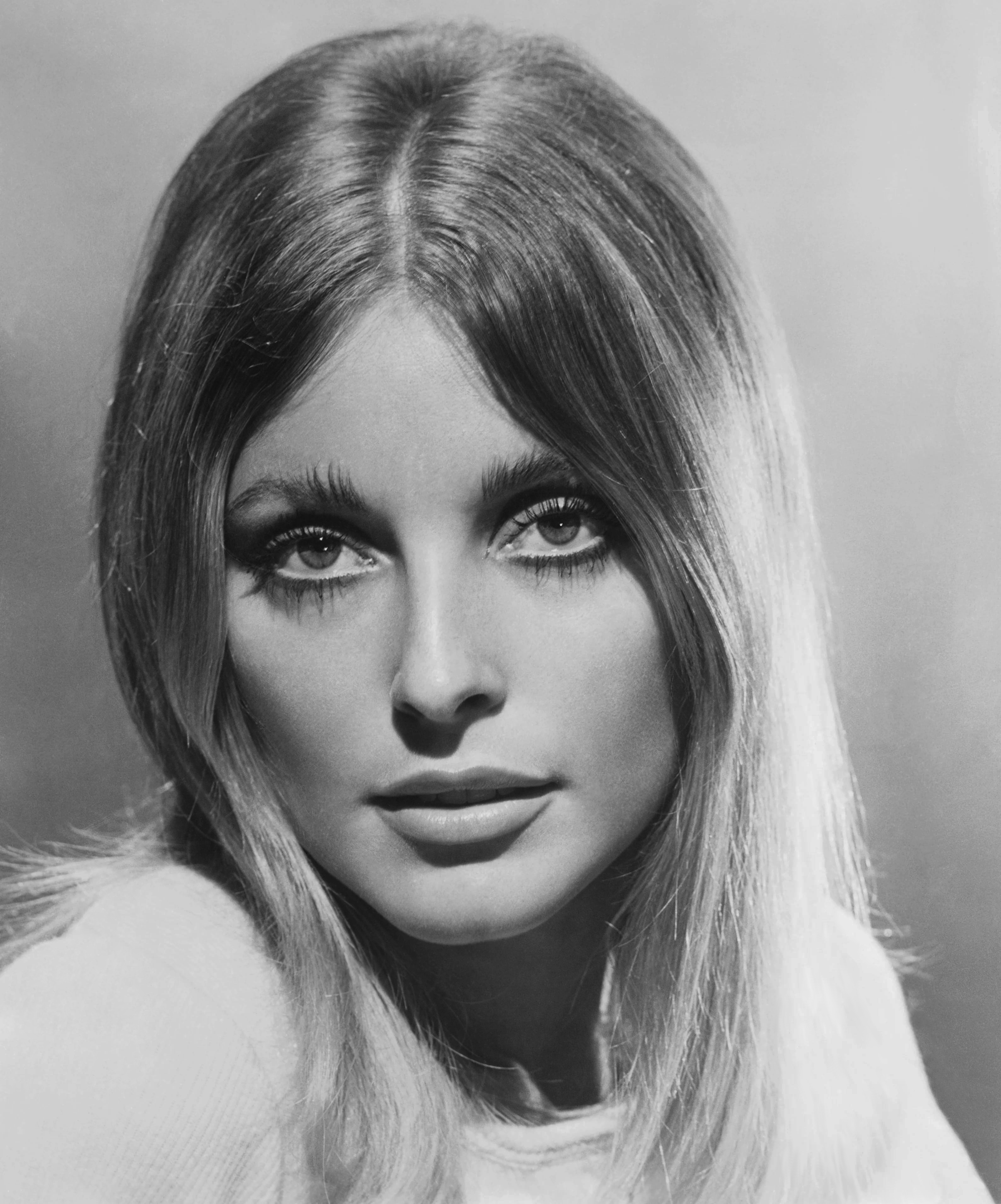
Reznor rented the house where actress Sharon Tate (pictured in 1967) was murdered, and set up a recording studio that he named Le Pig, where The Downward Spiral was recorded. The site was demolished shortly after the recording of the album.

Reznor searched for a location for a studio in Los Angeles and moved to 10050 Cielo Drive in 1992 for recording Broken and The Downward Spiral, a decision made against his initial choice to record the album in New Orleans. 10050 Cielo Drive is referred to as the "Tate House" since Sharon Tate was murdered by members of the Manson Family in 1969; Reznor named the studio "Le Pig" after the message that was scrawled on the front door with Tate's blood by her murderers, and stayed there with Malm for 18 months. He called his first night in 10050 Cielo Drive "terrifying" because he already knew it and read books related to the incident. Reznor chose the Tate house to calibrate his engineering skills and the band bought a large mixing console and two Studer multitrack tape machines as resources, a move that he believed was cheaper than renting a recording studio.

Reznor collaborated with the Jane's Addiction and Porno for Pyros drummer Stephen Perkins, the progressive rock guitarist Adrian Belew, and the Nine Inch Nails drummer Chris Vrenna. Belew's first visit to the studio involved playing the guitar parts in "Mr. Self Destruct", and he was told to play freely, think on reacting to melodies, concentrate on rhythm, and use noise. This approach improved Reznor's confidence in the instrument: he found it to be more expressive than the keyboard due to the interface. Belew praised Reznor for his "command of technology", and commented that the music of Nine Inch Nails made innovations "that are in [his] realm". Vrenna and Perkins played drum parts recorded live in the studio; the tracks were rendered into looped samples. Reznor took a similar approach to recording guitar parts: he would tape 20- to 25-minute-long sessions of himself playing guitars on a hard disc recorder with the Studio Vision sequencer.

Reznor frequently sampled excerpts from his guitar session tracks and processed them to sporadic and expressive points to convey the album's themes, also doing the same with drum parts. Digidesign's TurboSynth and Zoom 9030 effects unit were used extensively to process guitar tracks, often in conjunction with a Marshall JMP-1 preamp; Zoom 9030 was also used to distort vocals. Acoustic drums in various settings, as well as Roland's TR-808 and R-70 drum machines, which were sampled through multiple Akai S1000s and a Kurzweil K2000. Additionally, Vrenna had compiled various movie samples on Digital Audio Tapes for Reznor to sample, which were gradually identified by fans in the decades following the album's release. Other equipment and software Reznor used for recording the album included the Oberheim OB-Mx, Moog Minimoog, Sequential Circuits Prophet VS keyboard, Eventide H3000 Harmonizer, Pro Tools and various Jackson and Gibson guitars.

In December 1993, Reznor was confronted by Patti Tate, Sharon Tate's youngest sister, who asked if he was exploiting her sister's death in the house. Reznor responded that he was interested in the house as her death happened there. He later made a statement about this encounter during a 1997 interview with Rolling Stone:

While I was working on The Downward Spiral, I was living in the house where Sharon Tate was killed. Then one day I met her sister [Patti Tate]. It was a random thing, just a brief encounter. And she said: 'Are you exploiting my sister's death by living in her house?' For the first time, the whole thing kind of slapped me in the face. I said, 'No, it's just sort of my own interest in American folklore. I'm in this place where a weird part of history occurred.' I guess it never really struck me before, but it did then. She lost her sister from a senseless, ignorant situation that I don't want to support. When she was talking to me, I realized for the first time, 'What if it was my sister?' I thought, 'Fuck Charlie Manson.' I went home and cried that night. It made me see there's another side to things, you know?

The British producer and engineer Flood, who previously engineered and co-produced Nine Inch Nails' debut album Pretty Hate Machine and Broken, was brought back to co-produce The Downward Spiral; although it would be his last collaboration with Nine Inch Nails due to creative differences. For instance, a "very dangerously self-destructive" yet humorous short song written for the album, "Just Do It", was not included on the final version, criticized by Flood who said that Reznor had "gone too far". After the album's recording, Reznor moved out and the house was demolished shortly thereafter. "Hurt" was the last song written for the album, with both "Hurt" and "Big Man With A Gun" recorded as "an afterthought" at A&M Studios. The Downward Spiral entered its mixing and mastering processes, done at the Record Plant and A&M Studios with Alan Moulder, who subsequently took on more extensive production duties for future album releases.

== Music and lyrics ==
"Mr. Self Destruct"
Album version from The Downward Spiral

"The Becoming"
Album version from The Downward Spiral

"Ruiner"
Album version from The Downward Spiral

Numerous layers of metaphors are present throughout The Downward Spiral, leaving it open to wide interpretation. The album relays nihilism and is defined by a prominent theme of self-abuse and self-control. It is a semi-autobiographical concept album, in which the overarching plot follows the protagonist's descent into madness in his own inner solipsistic world through a metaphorical "downward spiral", dealing with religion, dehumanization, violence, disease, society, drugs, sex, and finally, suicide. Reznor described the concept as consisting of "someone who sheds everything around them to a potential nothingness, but through career, religion, relationship, belief and so on." Media journalists like The New York Times writer Jon Pareles noted the album's theme of angst had already been used by grunge bands like Nirvana, and that Nine Inch Nails' depiction was more generalized.

Using elements of genres such as techno, dance, electronic, heavy metal, and hard rock, The Downward Spiral is considered an industrial rock, alternative rock, industrial metal, industrial, and art rock album. Reznor regularly uses noise and distortion in his song arrangements that do not follow verse–chorus form, and incorporates dissonance with chromatic melody or harmony (or both). The treatment of metal guitars in Broken is carried over to The Downward Spiral, which includes innovative techniques such as expanded song structures and unconventional time signatures. The album features a wide range of textures and moods to illustrate the mental progress of the central protagonist. Reznor's singing follows a similar pattern from beginning to end, frequently moving from whispers to screams. These techniques are all used in the song "Hurt", which features a highly dissonant tritone played on guitar during the verses, a B5#11, emphasized when Reznor sings the eleventh note on the word "I" every time the B/E# dyad is played.

"Mr. Self Destruct", a song about a powerful person, follows a build-up sampled from the 1971 film THX 1138 with an "industrial roar" and is accompanied by an audio loop of a pinion rotating. "The Becoming" expresses the state of being dead and the protagonist's transformation into a non-human organism. "Closer" concludes with a chromatic piano motif: The melody is introduced during the second verse of "Piggy" on organ, then reappears in power chords at drop D tuning throughout the chorus of "Heresy", and recurs for the final time on "The Downward Spiral".

== Packaging ==
Committere, an installation featuring artwork and sketches for The Downward Spiral, "Closer" and "March of the Pigs" by Russell Mills was displayed at the Glasgow School of Art. Mills explained the ideas and materials that made up the artwork (titled "Wound") that was used for the album's cover art:

I had been thinking about making works that dealt with layers, physically, materially and conceptually. I wanted to produce works that were about both exposure and revealing and at the same dealt with closure and covering. Given the nature of the lyrics and the power of the music I was working with, I felt justified in attempting to make works that alluded to the apparently contradictory imagery of pain and healing. I wanted to make beautiful surfaces that partially revealed the visceral rawness of open wounds beneath. The mixed media work 'Wound' was the first piece I tackled in this vein (no pun intended) and it became the cover of the album. It is made of plaster, acrylics, oils, rusted metals, insects, moths, blood (mine), wax, varnishes, and surgical bandaging on a wooden panel.

== Promotion ==
=== Singles ===
"March of the Pigs" and "Closer" were released as singles; two other songs, "Hurt" and "Piggy", were issued to radio without a commercial single release. "March of the Pigs" has an unusual meter, alternating three bars of 7/8 time with one of 8/8. The song's music video was directed by Peter Christopherson and was shot twice; the first version scrapped due to Reznor's involvement, and the released second version being a live performance. It is one of the songs on the album to become a commercial success, and in 2020, Kerrang! and Billboard ranked the song number three and number six, respectively, on their lists of the greatest Nine Inch Nails songs.

"Closer" features a heavily modified bass drum sample from the Iggy Pop song "Nightclubbing" from his album The Idiot. Lyrically, it is a meditation on self-hatred and obsession, but to Reznor's dismay, the song was widely misinterpreted as a lust anthem due to its chorus, which included the line "I wanna fuck you like an animal". Reznor later stated: "It’s supernegative and superhateful. It’s 'I am a piece of shit and I am declaring that and if you think you want me, here I am.' I didn't think it would become a frat-party anthem or a titty-dancer anthem". The music video for "Closer" was directed by Mark Romanek and received frequent rotation on MTV, though the network heavily censored the original version, which they perceived to be too graphic. The video shows events in a laboratory dealing with religion, sexuality, animal cruelty, politics, and terror; controversial imagery included a nude bald woman with a crucifix mask, a monkey tied to a cross, a pig's head spinning on a machine, a diagram of a vulva, Reznor wearing an S&M mask while swinging in shackles, and of him wearing a ball gag. A radio edit that partially censored the song's explicit lyrics also received extensive airtime. The video has since been made part of the permanent collection of the Museum of Modern Art in New York City.

"Piggy" uses "nothing can stop me now", a line that recurs in "Ruiner" and "Big Man with a Gun". The frantic drumming on the song's outro is Reznor's only attempt at performing drums on the record, and one of the few "live" drum performances on the album. He had stated that the recording was from him testing the microphone setup in studio, but he liked the sound too much not to include it. It was released as a promotional single in December 1994 and reached the Top 20 on the Billboard Modern Rock Tracks chart.

Released in 1995, "Hurt", final track of The Downward Spiral song, includes references to self-harm and heroin addiction; while other people claims that it describes the difficult process of finding a reason to live in spite of depression and pain and does not have much to do with the storyline of The Downward Spiral. In 2002, American country singer Johnny Cash covered the song for his final album during his lifetime, American IV: The Man Comes Around. When Reznor was asked if Cash could cover his song, Reznor said he was "flattered" but worried that "the idea sounded a bit gimmicky". He became a fan of Cash's version, however, once he saw the music video.

A few weeks later, a CD shows up with the track. Again, I'm in the middle of something and put it on and give it a cursory listen. It sounded... weird to me. That song in particular was straight from my soul, and it felt very strange hearing the highly identifiable voice of Johnny Cash singing it. It was a good version, and I certainly wasn't cringing or anything, but it felt like I was watching my girlfriend fuck somebody else. Or something like that. Anyway, a few weeks later, a videotape shows up with Mark Romanek's video on it. It's morning; I'm in the studio in New Orleans working on Zack De La Rocha's record with him; I pop the video in, and... wow. Tears welling, silence, goose-bumps... Wow. I just lost my girlfriend, because that song isn't mine any more. Then it all made sense to me. It really made me think about how powerful music is as a medium and art form. I wrote some words and music in my bedroom as a way of staying sane, about a bleak and desperate place I was in, totally isolated and alone. Some-fucking-how that winds up reinterpreted by a music legend from a radically different era/genre and still retains sincerity and meaning – different, but every bit as pure. Things felt even stranger when he passed away. The song's purpose shifted again. It's incredibly flattering as a writer to have your song chosen by someone who's a great writer and a great artist.

— Geoff Rickly interviews Trent Reznor, Alternative Press

=== Self Destruct Tour ===
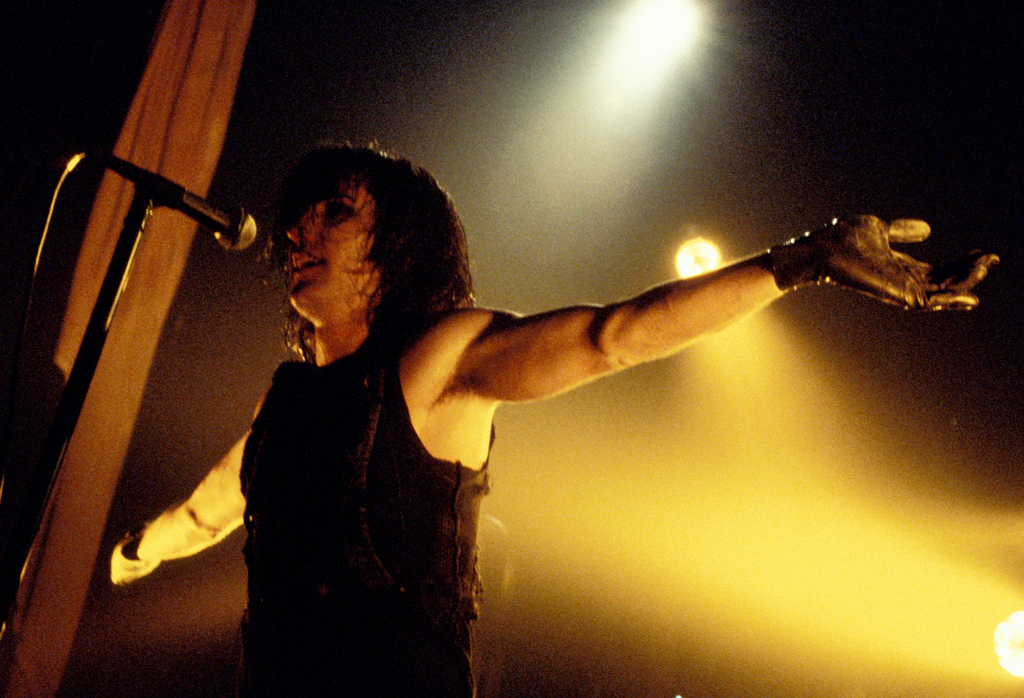
Reznor performing during the Self Destruct tour, c. 1994–1995

The Nine Inch Nails live band embarked on the Self Destruct tour in support of The Downward Spiral. Chris Vrenna and James Woolley performed drums and keyboards respectively, Robin Finck replaced Richard Patrick on guitar and the bassist Danny Lohner was added to the line-up. The stage set-up consisted of dirty curtains which would be pulled down and up for visuals shown during songs such as "Hurt". The back of the stage was littered with darker and standing lights, along with very few actual ones. The tour debuted the band's grungy and messy image in which they would come out in ragged clothes slathered in corn starch. The concerts were violent and chaotic, with band members often injuring themselves. They would frequently destroy their instruments at the end of concerts, attack each other, and stage-dive into the crowd.

The tour included a set at Woodstock '94 broadcast on pay-per-view and seen in as many as 24 million homes. Contrary to the widely held belief that it was an attention-grabbing ploy, the band said that being covered in mud was a result of pre-concert backstage play. However, in 2024, backstage home video emerged on YouTube showing Reznor asking the stage manager to give them "5 minutes for mud" when discussing show timings for getting to the stage and debating whether to find a mud pit or bring some into the dressing room in a bucket. The mud made it difficult for Reznor to navigate the stage and saw mud from his hair entering his eyes while performing. Nine Inch Nails were widely proclaimed to have "stolen the show" from their popular contemporaries, mostly classic rock bands, and their fan base expanded. The band received considerable mainstream success thereafter, performing with significantly higher production values and the addition of various theatrical visual elements. Its performances of "Wish" and "Happiness in Slavery" from the Woodstock concert earned the group a Grammy Award for Best Metal Performance in 1995. Entertainment Weekly commented about the band's Woodstock '94 performance: "Reznor unstrings rock to its horrifying, melodramatic core—an experience as draining as it is exhilarating". Despite this acclaim, Reznor attributed his dislike of the concert to its technical difficulties.

The main leg of the tour featured Marilyn Manson as the supporting act, who featured the bassist Jeordie White (then playing under the pseudonym "Twiggy Ramirez"); White later played bass with Nine Inch Nails from 2005 to 2007. After another tour leg supporting the remix album Further Down the Spiral, Nine Inch Nails contributed to the Alternative Nation Festival in Australia and subsequently embarked on the Dissonance Tour, which included 26 separate performances with co-headliner David Bowie on his Outside Tour. Nine Inch Nails was the opening act for the tour, and its set transitioned into Bowie's set with joint performances of both bands' songs. However, the crowds reportedly did not respond positively to the pairing due to their creative differences. Despite this, in a 2012 Rolling Stone readers' poll, the tour (pairing Nine Inch Nails with Bowie) was named one of the top 10 opening acts in rock history.

The tour concluded with "Nights of Nothing", a three-night showcase of performances from Nothing Records bands Marilyn Manson, Prick, Meat Beat Manifesto, and Pop Will Eat Itself, which ended with an 80-minute set from Nine Inch Nails. Kerrang! described the Nine Inch Nails set during the Nights of Nothing showcase as "tight, brash and dramatic", but was disappointed at the lack of new material. On the second of the three nights, Richard Patrick was briefly reunited with the band and contributed guitar to a performance of "Head Like a Hole". After the Self Destruct tour, Chris Vrenna, who had been a member of the live band since 1988 and frequent contributor to Nine Inch Nails studio recordings, left the act permanently to pursue a career in producing and to form Tweaker.

== Release and reception ==
Contemporary professional reviews
Review scores
Source	Rating
Chicago Tribune	3/4 stars
Entertainment Weekly	B+
Kerrang!	4/5 stars
Los Angeles Times	4/4 stars
NME	4/10
Rolling Stone	4/5 stars
USA Today	3/4 stars

The Downward Spiral's release date was delayed at various times to slow down Reznor's intended pace of the album's recording. The first delay caused the process of setting up Le Pig to take longer than he expected, and its release was postponed again as he was educating himself different ways to write songs that did not resemble those on Broken and Pretty Hate Machine. He considered delivering the album to Interscope in early 1993, only to experience a writer's block as he was unable to produce any satisfactory material. Interscope grew impatient and concerned with this progress, but Reznor was not forced by their demands of expediency despite crediting the label for giving him creative freedom. He told the producer Rick Rubin that his motivation for creating the album was to get it finished, thus Rubin responded that Reznor might not do so until he makes music that is allowed to be heard. Reznor realized that he was in the most fortunate situation he imagined when the album was recorded with a normal budget, "cool" equipment, and a studio to work at.

Released on March 8, 1994, to instant success, The Downward Spiral debuted at number two on the US Billboard 200, selling nearly 119,000 copies in its first week. On October 28, 1998, the Recording Industry Association of America (RIAA) certified the album quadruple platinum, and by December 2011, it had sold 3.7 million copies in the United States. The album peaked at number nine on the UK Albums Chart, and on July 22, 2013, it was certified gold by the British Phonographic Industry (BPI), denoting shipments in excess of 100,000 copies in the United Kingdom. It reached number 13 on the Canadian RPM albums chart and received a triple platinum certification from the Canadian Recording Industry Association (CRIA) for shipping 200,000 copies in Canada. A group of early listeners of the album viewed it as "commercial suicide", but Reznor did not make it for profit as his goal was to slightly broaden Nine Inch Nails' scope. Reznor felt that the finished product he delivered to Interscope was complete and faithful to his vision and thought its commercial potential was limited, but after its release he was surprised by the success and received questions about a follow-up single with a music video to be shown on MTV. The album has since sold over four million copies worldwide.

"His pop sense is more than a little skewed. What else can be said of a man who hands over the album's catchiest chorus – in the sinuous, engagingly rhythmic "Closer" – to a resolutely unprintable sex lyric? Clearly, Nine Inch Nails is neither MTV-bound nor radio friendly this time out."

— J.D. Considine, The Baltimore Sun.

Many music critics and audiences praised The Downward Spiral for its abrasive, eclectic nature and dark themes and commented on the concept of a destruction of a man. The New York Times writer Jon Pareles' review of the album found the music to be highly abrasive. Pareles asserted that unlike other electro-industrial groups like Ministry and Nitzer Ebb, "Reznor writes full-fledged tunes" with stronger use of melodies than riffs. He noticed criticisms of Nine Inch Nails from industrial purists for popularizing the genre and the album's transgression. Writing in The Baltimore Sun, J.D. Considine said, "And yet, beneath its carefully constructed clangor lies something akin to what Yeats described as "a terrible beauty" – music that elevates and inspires even as it delves into the darkest corners of anguish, self-loathing and despair." Village Voice critic Robert Christgau gave it an "honorable mention" in his capsule review column and summed the record up as, "musically, Hieronymus Bosch as postindustrial atheist; lyrically, Transformers as kiddie porn." Jonathan Gold, writing for Rolling Stone, likened the album to cyberpunk fiction. Entertainment Weekly reviewer Tom Sinclair commented: "Reznor's pet topics (sex, power, S&M, hatred, transcendence) are all here, wrapped in hooks that hit your psyche with the force of a blowtorch."

"It's all about rage, frustration, fucked-up sexuality, guilt, control, lack of control, things everyone has experienced at one point or another, things Reznor takes to the nth power, things that make you want to stuff your fingers in your ears so you don't have to hear. But instead you keep going back because of that sick human thing that makes carnage fascinating."

— Karen Woods, The Rocket.

Some reviewers criticised what they saw as "shock value" and "graphic, gratuitous references to rape and suicide". Stereo Review magazine described it as, "Tuneless noise, sex and violence, existential angst..." Cleveland's The Plain Dealer said "Reznor comes across like a demented poster child for Psychotics Anonymous" and the album relied on "the same tired lyrical images and stereotypes that bands such as Black Sabbath and Judas Priest have used in heavy metal for years". In a Rolling Stone cover story six months later, Reznor reflected on the unfair reception he felt the band had received in their old home town: "When Downward Spiral came out, it got almost universally good reviews...except for the scathing, scathing reviews in Cleveland." Nevertheless, when Nine Inch Nails came under fire for the explicit lyrics to "Big Man With A Gun" a year later, the same paper published two articles in defence of the album, saying, "There's a truth in Reznor's profanity – and in the lyrics of many of the rappers that Dole and Bennett would silence – that's purer than anything that's come out of Washington in 25 years."

=== Accolades ===
The Downward Spiral has been listed on several publications' best album lists. In 2003, the album was ranked number 200 on Rolling Stone magazine's list of The 500 Greatest Albums of All Time, then was re-ranked 201 in a 2012 revised list. The Rolling Stone staff wrote: "Holing up in the one-time home of Manson-family victim Sharon Tate, Trent Reznor made an overpowering meditation on NIN's central theme: control." It moved up to 122 on the magazine's revised list in 2020. The album was placed 10th on Spin's 125 Best Albums of the Past 25 Years list; the Spin staff quoted Ann Powers' review that appreciated its bleak, aggressive style. It was ranked number 488 in the book The Top 500 Heavy Metal Albums of All Time by heavy metal music critic Martin Popoff. In 2001, Q named The Downward Spiral as one of the 50 Heaviest Albums of All Time; in 2010, the album was ranked number 102 on their 250 Best Albums of Q's Lifetime (1986–2011) list. The Downward Spiral was featured in Robert Dimery's book 1001 Albums You Must Hear Before You Die. In May 2014, Loudwire placed The Downward Spiral at number two on its "10 Best Hard Rock Albums of 1994" list. In July 2014, Guitar World placed The Downward Spiral at number 43 in their "Superunknown: 50 Iconic Albums That Defined 1994" list.

== Legacy ==
Retrospective professional reviews
Review scores
Source	Rating
AllMusic	5/5 stars
Blender	4/5 stars
Christgau's Consumer Guide	(2-star Honorable Mention)
Encyclopedia of Popular Music	5/5 stars
Kerrang!	5/5 stars
Mojo	4/5 stars
Pitchfork	8.3/10
PopMatters	9/10
The Rolling Stone Album Guide	5/5 stars
Spin Alternative Record Guide	9/10

The immediate success of The Downward Spiral established Nine Inch Nails as a reputable force in the 1990s. The band's image and musical style became so recognizable that a Gatorade commercial featured a remix of "Down in It" without their participation. Reznor felt uncomfortable with the media hype and success the band earned, received false reports of his death, depression, and was falsely reported to have had a relationship with serial killer Jeffrey Dahmer, and was depicted as a sex icon. Nine Inch Nails received several honors, including Grammy Award nominations for Best Alternative Performance for The Downward Spiral and Best Rock Song for "Hurt". After the release of The Downward Spiral, many bands such as Gravity Kills, Stabbing Westward, Filter, and Mötley Crüe made albums that imitated the sound of Nine Inch Nails. Reznor interpreted The Downward Spiral as an extension of himself that "became the truth fulfilling itself", as he experienced personal and social issues presented in the album after its release. He had already struggled with social anxiety disorder and depression and started his abuse of narcotics including cocaine while he went on an alcohol binge. Around this time, his studio perfectionism, struggles with addiction, and bouts of writer's block prolonged the production of The Fragile, and Reznor completed rehabilitation from drugs in 2001.

One year after The Downward Spiral’s release, the band released an accompanying remix album titled Further Down the Spiral. It features contributions from Coil with Danny Hyde, J. G. Thirlwell, electronic musician Aphex Twin, producer Rick Rubin, and Jane's Addiction guitarist Dave Navarro. The album peaked at number 23 on the Billboard 200 and received mixed reviews. Recoiled, a remix EP of "Gave Up", "Closer", "The Downward Spiral", and "Eraser" by Coil, was released on February 24, 2014, via British record label Cold Spring.

Retrospective reviews regard The Downward Spiral as one of the most important albums of the 1990s and Reznor's greatest work. The 2004 edition of The New Rolling Stone Album Guide gave the album five out of five stars and called it "a powerful statement, and one of the landmark albums of the Nineties". Writing for Entertainment Weekly, Kyle Anderson remembered watching the music video of "Closer" on MTV as an adolescent and expressed that the album changed his perception of popular music from that of songs heard on the radio to albums with cover art. The album was also included in the book 1001 Albums You Must Hear Before You Die. Adrien Begrand of Stylus Magazine considers The Downward Spiral to be an "over-the-top masterpiece" that ranks alongside My Bloody Valentine's Loveless (1991) as the best-produced album of the 1990s.

== Controversies ==
Due to the album's aggressive and transgressive lyrics, as well as its political and social coverage, The Downward Spiral gained cultural impact that was surrounded by controversy.

=== Richard Patrick controversy surrounding "Piggy" ===
Richard Patrick, who was Nine Inch Nails' guitarist until partway through The Downward Spiral sessions, has stated in interviews that "Piggy" was his nickname and that he believed the song was aimed at him. Reflecting on their fallout, Patrick remarked: "When a guy writes a song called 'Piggy' about you, there's obviously tension or some leftover shit... you know, I wish it hadn't been so complicated and so weird." Others interpreted “Piggy” as a reference to the Sharon Tate–Manson murders, which Reznor denied. He clarified that the songs "Piggy" and "March of the Pigs" were written before his involvement with that location and were not about that tragedy: "I had the song 'Piggy' written long before it was ever known that I would be in that house... 'March of the Pigs' has nothing to do with the Tate murders…".

Before the release of The Downward Spiral, Patrick left the band in 1993 after experiencing discrepancies with Reznor, and at the same time he formed the band Filter. Some critics and fans see the song's themes —betrayal, isolation, defiance ("nothing can stop me now")— as rooted in personal relationships, not broader cultural references. One commentary suggests the lyrics could be about a breakup before Reznor moved to LA, or reflect personal discord rather than the dramatic backdrop of the studio's history.

=== "Big Man with a Gun" lyrics ===
"I realize that once it is in the store it is other people's domain to interpret. That is what is interesting about this as a medium of communications. Unless it is something I feel really strongly about that is being misinterpreted. For instance, I have been accused of misogyny and shit like that. I think, "You're not getting the point." Like "Big Man With a Gun", "Oh, you're advocating..." Should I even have to comment on that?"

— Trent Reznor, Plazm.

The Downward Spiral's emphasis on transgressive themes drew criticism from American social conservatives. Senator Bob Dole, then the head of the Republican Party, sharply denounced Time Warner, the former owner of Interscope's former parent company Warner Music Group, after a meeting between Michael J. Fuchs (head of WMG), William Bennett, and C. Delores Tucker. During the meeting, Tucker and Bennett demanded that Fuchs recite lyrics from "Big Man with a Gun". Interscope had previously been blamed for releasing gangsta rap albums by rappers such as Dr. Dre, 2Pac and Snoop Dogg that were deemed objectionable. Reznor called Tucker (who erroneously referred to Nine Inch Nails as a gangsta rap act) "such a fucking idiot", and claimed that the song was actually a satire of the gangsta rap genre as a whole and was originally about madness. Reznor conceded The Downward Spiral could be "harmful, through implying and subliminally suggesting things", whereas hardcore hip hop could be "cartoonish". Robert Bork also repeatedly referenced "Big Man with a Gun" in his book Slouching Toward Gomorrah as evidence of a supposed cultural decline.

=== Connection to mass shootings ===
Another form of the Downward Spiral ... deeper & deeper it goes. to cuddle w. her, to be one w. her, to love; just laying there. I need a gun. This is a weird entry ... I should feel happy, but shit brought me down.

— Dylan Klebold from one of his journals two years before the shooting.

Before the Columbine High School massacre, perpetrator Dylan Klebold referenced lyrics from Nine Inch Nails songs multiple times in his journal. Klebold heavily identified with the protagonist of The Downward Spiral as a symbol of his own depression. On May 4, 1999, a hearing on the marketing and distribution practices of violent content to minors by the television, music, film, and video game industries was conducted before the United States Senate Committee on Commerce, Science and Transportation. The committee heard testimony from cultural observers, professors, and mental health professionals, that included conservative William Bennett and the Archbishop of Denver, Reverend Charles J. Chaput. Participants criticized the album, Nine Inch Nails' label-mate Marilyn Manson, and the 1999 film The Matrix for their alleged contribution to the environment that made incidents like Columbine possible. The committee requested that the Federal Trade Commission and the United States Department of Justice investigate the entertainment industry's marketing practices to minors.

Ethan Miller, the perpetrator of the 2022 Bend, Oregon shooting wrote a private digital journal starting on June 29 on Wattpad titled The Downward Spiral of Ethan Miller, which was named after The Downward Spiral. In this journal, he detailed his plan and motivations for committing a mass shooting. Miller wrote that he wanted to murder people due to his isolation, loneliness, feuds with his family, and frustrations at being unable to find a girlfriend. He also wrote lyrics from The Downward Spiral album and other artists such as Disturbed and KMFDM.

=== iPhone application refusal ===
In 2009, Apple rejected a proposal for a Nine Inch Nails iPhone software application, citing objectionable content in the title track. Days later, Apple reversed the decision, but refused to explain its reasoning; however, they noted that the app has "objectionable content". In response to this action, Reznor tweeted "The NIN iPhone app is unchanged, the 'issues' seem to have been resolved". The developer posted a message on the Nine Inch Nails discussion boards explaining the situation further:

v1.0 is live. v1.0.3 got rejected due to content yet the app has no content in it. This was mainly a stability release to fix the bug that crashes the app for international users. The bug was fixed 24 hours after 1.0 went live and we have been waiting for Apple to approve it ever since. Meanwhile the app continues to get a growing number of 1 star ratings from international users understandably frustrated by the bug, but looks like our hands are tied.

== Track listing ==
All tracks are written by Trent Reznor.

No.	Title	Length
1.	"Mr. Self Destruct"	4:31
2.	"Piggy"	4:24
3.	"Heresy"	3:54
4.	"March of the Pigs"	2:59
5.	"Closer"	6:14
6.	"Ruiner"	4:58
7.	"The Becoming"	5:31
8.	"I Do Not Want This"	5:41
9.	"Big Man with a Gun"	1:36
10.	"A Warm Place"	3:22
11.	"Eraser"	4:53
12.	"Reptile"	6:52
13.	"The Downward Spiral"	3:58
14.	"Hurt"	6:16
Total length:		65:02

Notes

- The opening sounds of "Mr. Self Destruct" are a sample from the film THX 1138 in which a man is being beaten by a prison guard.
- The drum-beat on "Closer" was sampled from Iggy Pop's song "Nightclubbing". The song also contains a sample from Roxy Music's song "Take a Chance with Me", although it is sped-up and reversed.
- The sample of screams that plays throughout "The Becoming" is from the film Robot Jox, when a giant robot falls on a crowd of spectators.
- The sample at the beginning of "Big Man with a Gun" comes from a studio-altered recording of a porn star having an orgasm. According to the album booklet, this "sample" is titled "Steakhouse" and is credited to Tommy Lee.
- Japanese pressings of the album contain a cover of Joy Division's song "Dead Souls", originally included on the soundtrack to the film The Crow. The track is placed in between "Big Man with a Gun" and "A Warm Place".
- The break in "Reptile" contains an audio sample (starting at 5:06) of a woman falling down a hill from the 1974 film The Texas Chain Saw Massacre. Additionally, the mechanical sounds of the opening (starting at 0:58) are from the cargo loader exosuit from the 1986 film Aliens.
- The first Australian pressing has track length errors. Affected tracks do not play at their beginnings when selected individually ("Big Man with a Gun" has the beginning of "A Warm Place" tacked on, likewise all the songs up to "Hurt" start 41 seconds earlier than they should. "Hurt" itself has 44 seconds of silence on the end as a result); however, the disc plays and flows correctly as a whole.

=== Deluxe edition (Halo 8 DE) ===
To mark the album's tenth anniversary, The Downward Spiral was re-released on November 23, 2004, in high-resolution SACD and DualDisc formats. Disc one of the album's deluxe edition re-release is nearly identical to the original version; track anomalies such as sounds from previous tracks creeping up on start of tracks are fixed, and it includes a stereo and multi-channel SACD layer. The second bonus disc is a collection of remixes and B-sides and also includes a stereo SACD layer in addition to the Redbook CD layer. The last three tracks on the bonus disc are previously unreleased demo recordings from the original album.

All tracks are written by Trent Reznor, except "Dead Souls" by Joy Division and "Memorabilia" by Soft Cell.

Bonus disc
No.	Title	Length
1.	"Burn" (from Natural Born Killers)	4:58
2.	"Closer (Precursor)" (from "Closer to God")	7:17
3.	"Piggy (Nothing Can Stop Me Now)" (from Further Down the Spiral)	4:02
4.	"A Violet Fluid" (from "March of the Pigs")	1:04
5.	"Dead Souls" (from The Crow or Japanese Edition)	4:54
6.	"Hurt (Quiet)" (from Further Down the Spiral, US version)	5:09
7.	"Closer to God" (from "Closer to God")	5:06
8.	"All the Pigs, All Lined Up" (from "March of the Pigs")	7:26
9.	"Memorabilia" (from "Closer to God")	7:21
10.	"The Downward Spiral (The Bottom)" (from Further Down the Spiral)	7:33
11.	"Ruiner" (Demo)	4:51
12.	"Liar" (Reptile Demo)	6:56
13.	"Heresy" (Demo)	4:01
Total length:		70:38

DualDisc (Halo 8 DVD-A)

The DualDisc edition of The Downward Spiral contains the same CD content on Side A as the Deluxe Edition, with a DVD-Audio layer on Side B. When played on DVD-Video players a Dolby Digital 5.1 multi-channel or Dolby Digital 2.0 stereo mix of The Downward Spiral can be selected, along with videos of "March of the Pigs", "Hurt" and an uncensored video of "Closer". There is also an interactive discography and an image gallery. High resolution 24-bit/48 kHz 5.1 Surround sound and stereo versions of The Downward Spiral can be played on a DVD-Audio player, allowing the user a similar high fidelity experience as the SACD layer of the Deluxe Edition. The DualDisc release does not contain the additional B-sides and demo tracks.

== Personnel ==
Credits adapted from the liner notes of The Downward Spiral.

- Trent Reznor – vocals, all performance except where noted, arranger, producer (all tracks), drum treatments (track 8), mixing (track 14), programming, continuity
- Mark "Flood" Ellis – producer (tracks 1, 2, 5–7, 10–12), hi-hat programming (track 5), ARP 2600 (track 7), drum treatments (track 8)
- Chris Vrenna – drums (track 14), programming, continuity, additional sampling and sound design, additional drums (on "Burn"), additional engineering
- Adrian Belew – texture generating guitar (track 1), ring mod guitar (track 7)
- Danny Lohner – additional guitar (track 9)
- Andy Kubiszewski – drums (track 13)
- Stephen Perkins – drum performance (track 8)
- Charlie Clouser – programming, continuity
- Alan Moulder – mixing engineer (tracks 1–8, 10–13), additional engineering
- Sean Beavan – mixing engineer (track 9), additional engineering
- Bill Kennedy – mixing engineer (track 9), additional engineering
- John Aguto – additional engineering
- Brian Pollack – additional engineering
- Tom Baker – mastering
- Bob Ludwig – high-resolution mastering (reissue)
- James Brown – 5.1 mix (reissue)
- Neal Ferrazzani – assistance (reissue)
- Russell Mills – paintings
- David Buckland – photography
- Gary Talpas – package
- Rob Sheridan – package, additional photography (reissue)

== Charts ==
=== Weekly charts ===
Chart (1994)	Peak position
Australian Albums (ARIA)	12
Canada Top Albums/CDs (RPM)	13
European Albums (Music & Media)	38
Finnish Albums (Suomen virallinen lista)	34
New Zealand Albums (RMNZ)	23
Scottish Albums (Official Charts)	8
Swedish Albums (Sverigetopplistan)	33
UK Albums (Official Charts)	9
US Billboard 200	2

Chart (2026)	Peak position
Greek Albums (IFPI)	57

=== Year-end charts ===
Chart (1994)	Position
Canada Top Albums/CDs (RPM)	92
US Billboard 200	59

Chart (1995)	Position
US Billboard 200	69

Chart (1997)	Position
Canadian Hard Rock Albums (Nielsen Soundscan)	25

== Certifications ==
Region	Certification	Certified units/sales
Australia (ARIA)	Gold	35,000^{^}
Canada (Music Canada)	3× Platinum	300,000^{^}
United Kingdom (BPI)	Gold	100,000^{^}
United States (RIAA)	4× Platinum	4,000,000
^{^} Shipments figures based on certification alone.
