= Martin O'Brien (artist) =

English artist

Martin O’Brien
- Born: August 7, 1987 (age 38); Burnley, Lancashire, U.K.
- Education: Dartington College of Arts; Aberystwyth University; University of Reading
- Known for: Performance art endurance art disability art
- Notable work: Mucus Factory (2011-2014); Breathe for Me (2011-2015); Dust to Dust with Sheree Rose (2015); If It Were The Apocalypse I’d Eat You To Stay Alive (2015)

Martin O’Brien (born August 7, 1987) is a contemporary artist who lives and works in London, U.K.

== Life ==
O’Brien was born in Burnley, Lancashire in 1987. In his formative years Martin was a keen member of Burnley Youth Theatre where he took on a number of roles, including Terry Dumpton in the play The Terrible Fate of Humpty Dumpty and Ernie in Ernie's Incredible Illucinations. He studied art at Dartington College of Arts, receiving a BA in 2008; and subsequently received a MA in performance from Aberystwyth University, and a practice-based PhD from University of Reading. He is Head of Department of the Department of Drama at Queen Mary University of London.

== Work ==
O’Brien is best known for performance art actions in which he uses endurance and un-simulated injury to explore his experience of living with cystic fibrosis, a chronic genetic illness. A key proponent of disability art in the U.K., O’Brien uses performance art as well as installation and video to challenge common representations of illness and disability and examine what it means to be born with a life-threatening disease. His performances include vignettes that employ percussive therapeutic techniques designed to treat the symptoms of cystic fibrosis (beating the chest to expel phlegm); or invented techniques such as cutting the shape of lungs onto the skin of his chest. For example, Mucus Factory of 2011 (which lasts between three and six hours) is structured by a cycle of actions through which O’Brien performs versions of therapeutic interventions required to maintain his health and slow the progress of cystic fibrosis.

His works also tend to borrow the styling, actions, and paraphernalia of sadomasochistic practices, including genital piercing, autoerotic asphyxiation, or mummification. His use of imagery derived from BDSM is often in direct dialogue with the work of the late Bob Flanagan, a pioneering artist who similarly used pain and endurance to explore his experiences as a person with cystic fibrosis in the 1980s and 1990s. Since the first version of his major work Mucus Factory in 2011, O’Brien has collaborated frequently with Flanagan’s former collaborator (and widow), the artist Sheree Rose, including most recently on the durational performance and video installation The Viewing (2016).

According to an interview for BBC Radio, having lived beyond his life expectancy twice, first beyond the age of five and then beyond 30, O’Brien identifies as a zombie; this has informed his recent works, including his comical uses of zombie imagery in works such as If It Were The Apocalypse I’d Eat You To Stay Alive (2015), as well as prompting him to spend his 30th birthday in an abandoned morgue (during a 24-hour performance in 2017).

In a conversation with the artist Tim Etchells, O’Brien stated:

I work with the materiality of my disease. So the mucus I produce becomes a material to use and I work with ideas of duration and physical endurance and infliction of pain on my body. I talk about the politics of sickness and at the moment a lot of my work is around the figure of a zombie. I’m doing work that thinks about how I might use the zombie as a metaphor for thinking about sickness and what it means to be sick.

His work has been presented throughout the UK, Europe and the USA including Spill Festival (London), Kapelica Gallery (Ljubljana), Abrons Art Center (New York), ONE National Gay and Lesbian Archives (Los Angeles), Tate Britain, London, In Between Time Festival of Performance (Bristol), Chapter Arts Centre (Cardiff), and Grace Exhibition Space (New York). He has been funded and commissioned by organisations such as Arts Council England, British Council, and the Live Art Development Agency.

Survival of the Sickest, the first book about O'Brien's work, was published in 2018 by the Live Art Development Agency. It includes essays by Alphonso Lingis, Amelia Jones, Yetta Howard and Gianna Bouchard.
