= Broken (1993 film) =

1993 short film by Peter Christopherson

- Unofficial cover included with the DVD leak
- Directed by: Peter Christopherson
- Written by: Trent Reznor
- Produced by: Trent Reznor
- Starring: Trent Reznor; Bob Flanagan
- Music by: Nine Inch Nails
- Release date: 1993
- Running time: 20 minutes
- Country: United States
- Language: English

Broken (informally known as The Broken Movie) is a 1993 American horror musical short film and long-form music video filmed and directed by Peter Christopherson. It is based on an idea by Trent Reznor, founder of industrial rock band Nine Inch Nails, and is a companion piece to the 1992 Nine Inch Nails EP Broken.

The film features songs from Broken and is essentially a compilation of its music videos (the exception being "Last" and the two hidden tracks). The 20-minute film weaves the album's four music videos together via a violent "snuff film" framing sequence, concluding with an otherwise unreleased video for the EP's final song, "Gave Up", to set the conclusion of the film's frame story to the song.

Due to its extremely graphic content, Broken was never officially released, but was leaked as a bootleg that became heavily traded on VHS in the 1990s and more recently online. Reznor said that Broken makes the music video for "Happiness in Slavery", one of the tracks on the album, "look like a Disney movie".

While Reznor's comments about the film have been cryptic at best, he makes no secret of its existence, and the entire uncensored film is available to view when accessed by a hidden link on the discography page of the official Nine Inch Nails website.

== Plot ==
The final scene of "Happiness in Slavery". The torture machine can be seen in the center, with Trent Reznor near the far wall.

The film begins with a person being executed by hanging. The trap door opens and the man drops with a serene smile on his face. The movie then cuts to footage of an amateur video taken from inside a car going through various parts of a city, from the middle-class suburbs to the other side of the tracks into a shoddy industrial area. While this happening you can see the “n” from the broken album and the work “Broken” on the screen. The car approaches a young man on the sidewalk. Almost immediately, he is suddenly seen in a basement, tied with a seatbelt to a chair and cleave-gagged while being forced to watch a television.

The music video for "Pinion" begins in a bathroom. The camera zooms in on a toilet flushing, and a network of pipes is shown leading to a contraption with a large gear system and a pressure gauge on it. As the camera zooms out, a tight plastic bodybag-like suit suspended in a padded cell with six rods by the side is shown, with the end of the pipes attached to the mouth portion with water gushing in, presumably to drown the person inside. An alternative interpretation is that the person bound inside is being fed the "waste of the world" coming through the pipes.

Cutting back to the amateur video, the killer, wearing some sort of leather mask, pulls the victim's head back and forces him to drink some sort of liquid from a jerrycan. The middle of the music video for "Wish" is again interrupted by amateur footage, showing the victim chained to a table with a large wad of a dark substance on his face. As the killer is then seen putting his pants on, it is usually assumed that the substance is feces. After the video ends, the killer repeatedly rewinds to the part of the music video where Trent Reznor screams "fist fuck!" and begins to rub his fist.

The video for "Help Me I Am in Hell" shows a middle-aged man in a room filled with flies. He ignores them while eating steak and drinking wine, despite the fact that the flies enter his mouth while he eats. The video cuts away several times to show the same man in bondage gear. This video was blacked out in the most prominent leak, and also was not known to exist until the release of Closure. it is now generally believed (although not proven) to also be part of the complete film, but was blacked out by Reznor in the bootlegged copy. Reznor later admitted to distributing different copies of Broken to his friends, each with a different part of the video blacked out so that he would be able to identify the culprit if it were to be leaked.

Following the music video, the victim is shown still tied to a table as the killer proceeds to rip his teeth out. The video for "Happiness in Slavery", which was banned by music video channels worldwide, begins. The most widely known part of the movie, it features performance artist Bob Flanagan stripping off his clothes and settling down on a machine that tortures, rapes, and kills him before grinding him up to fertilize a patch of soil beneath the machine.

The film ends with the music video for "Gave Up", which is a different video from the one on Closure as it is not an actual Nine Inch Nails video but rather the band's music dubbed over the storyline of the movie. At this point, the victim is suspended from the ceiling and is repeatedly attacked by the perpetrator, first with a blade and then a blowtorch, after which the killer slices off the victim's penis with a straight razor, while footage of police searching through the basement and finding remains of previous victims is shown.

Finally, the film cuts back to the victim strapped on a table, as the murderer hacks his limbs off with a chainsaw, rapes him, and slices his chest open to eat his heart. The film then cuts back to the execution scene, again showing the killer being dropped through the trap door with a smile on his face. He falls through an immensely long tunnel until the rope suddenly tightens. The "n" in orange then comes on the screen. 30 seconds after the film ends, with no audio and a black screen, the severed head of the killer flies across the screen. It concludes with the text, "Copyright 1993, Interscope Records".

== Cast and crew ==
Much of the cast, aside from Bob Flanagan in "Happiness in Slavery" and the band itself in "Wish", is unknown. The film and the "Wish" video was directed by industrial music pioneer Peter Christopherson of the band Throbbing Gristle and co-founder of Industrial Records, with Director of Photography Steve Tickner and Gaffer James Chaisty, although the other music videos were directed by various other people: "Pinion" and "Help Me I Am in Hell" is credited to Eric Goode and Serge Becker, while "Happiness in Slavery" is credited to Jon Reiss.

== Production ==
Broken was created as a companion piece to the EP of the same name after Reznor wanted to create an art project based on the EP with Christopherson, who intended the piece to be "a comment on the existence of snuff movies and people's obsession with them". At the time, however, Reznor was recording in the house where the Tate murders were committed; seeing the video made him uneasy, so the project was shelved, though not before Reznor circulated a few copies on VHS. Christopherson himself has expressed regret in the film's eventual popularity: while he intended the film to be obviously fake, the degradation in quality as the tapes got copied over and over have made the distinction and his "pretty obvious clues," such as the use of a fake head during the tooth removal sequence, harder and harder to spot.

== Availability ==
The film has not been given an official commercial release because Reznor wanted to stop it from overshadowing the prominence of the music, thus adding to its mythological status in alternative culture. The original hand-dubbed tapes were distributed by Reznor to various friends with technological glitches implemented at certain points, in order to identify the leaker of any copies that might surface. Reznor, commenting in the "Access" section of the Nine Inch Nails website in 2007, implied that Gibby Haynes was responsible for the most prominent leak. This copy was traded on VHS tapes for years (resulting in many poor-quality, high-generation copies), and was later encoded in MPEG and AVI formats and distributed extensively through peer-to-peer networks and Nine Inch Nails fan websites. These are generally not of the highest quality, as they are not first-generation copies.

The music videos (without the interstitial footage between songs) for "Pinion", "Wish", "Help Me I Am in Hell", and "Happiness in Slavery" were made officially available on Closure and on the official Nine Inch Nails website.

On Fixed (the 1992 remix CD for the Broken EP), remixers employed a heavily processed sample of Flanagan's screaming from the "Happiness in Slavery" video as part of the rhythm in the tracks "Screaming Slave" and a remix of the "Happiness in Slavery" song (although the sample is very obscure on the latter). On the Collected DVD that was sent out in promotion of the album With Teeth in 2005, portions of the movie are shown for a few seconds in crystal-clear quality.

In August 2005, a new copy of the movie was distributed via BitTorrent as a remastered DVD image. The remaster, titled "Broken 2.0", was primarily sourced from a low-generation copy of the tape that was anonymously sent to a long-time member of the online fan community; however, much of the music video content was replaced with higher-resolution footage sourced from the VHS release of Closure. Like all of the copies that existed online prior to that point, this version does not have video footage during "Help Me I Am in Hell", but a blank screen instead. Menu screens, a chapter index, and the option to listen to the audio tracks from the CD without added sound effects are all distinct features of "Broken 2.0".

On December 30, 2006, an unofficial version of the film was released on a DVD disc image and distributed via The Pirate Bay by the same anonymous user called "seed0", who had uploaded the leaked DVD version of Closure. The DVD image represents a significant upgrade in visual and audio quality from "Broken 2.0." and includes the oft-missing video for "Help Me I Am in Hell". Fans have speculated that the footage is from the master tape and that Trent Reznor himself leaked it online along with the Closure DVD leak, as implied by a post on his official blog on December 21, 2006, which said: "Happy Holidays! This one is a guilt-free download. (shhhh - I didn't say that out loud). If you know what I'm talking about, cool."

On May 6, 2013, the entire video was made available for streaming on Vimeo via Nine Inch Nails' Tumblr page. It was removed by Vimeo almost immediately, and the Tumblr post was updated with an allusion to The Pirate Bay. In July 2014, the full video returned to Vimeo, but was once again deleted. As of January 2020, the entire uncensored film is available to view when accessed by a hidden link on the discography page of the official Nine Inch Nails website, leading to a copy in the Internet Archive.
