= Fun to be Dead =

Poetry collection

Fun to be Dead: The Poems of Bob Flanagan
- Editor: Sabrina Tarasoff
- Author: Bob Flanagan
- Cover artist: Lauren Graycar (designer)
- Language: English
- Genre: Poetry, memoir, BDSM writing
- Published: 2024
- Publisher: Kristina Kite Gallery / Pep Talk
- Publication place: United States
- Media type: Print (softcover)
- Pages: 176
- First complete collection of Flanagan's poetry.

Fun to be Dead: The Poems of Bob Flanagan is a posthumous poetry collection by Bob Flanagan, the American performance artist and writer. The collection features six books, within one volume, that document Flanagan's evolution as a poet and writer, as well as contributions by Jack Skelley, Sheree Rose, Chiara Moioli, David Trinidad, Dodie Bellamy, and Dennis Cooper.

== Background ==
Flanagan suffered from cystic fibrosis throughout his life, a disease that claimed the lives of two of his sisters. Doctors expected him not to live past the age of seven, though he died at age 43. By his late thirties, Flanagan had to hospitalize himself before and after his performances.

A lifelong interest in BDSM became an obsession in both Flanagan's life and work, an obsession that was explored and managed with his wife Sheree Rose, a dominatrix.

In 2022, a posthumous showing of Flanagan's work, titled "Flanagan's Wake" after Dennis Cooper's eulogy, premiered at the Kristina Kite Gallery in Los Angeles.

== Books ==
Fun to be Dead is one volume, organized into six sections (or "books"), with essays and critical commentaries included. These books are:

- The Kid is the Man (1978)
- The Wedding of Everything (1983)
- Slave Sonnets (1986)
- Fuck Journal (1987) — originally Hanuman Books #13
- A Taste of Honey (with David Trinidad) (1990) — originally a Sherwood Press collaboration
- The Book of Medicine — Flanagan's unfinished manuscript
