= Sick: The Life and Death of Bob Flanagan, Supermasochist =

1997 film by Kirby Dick

- Directed by: Kirby Dick
- Produced by: Kirby Dick
- Edited by: Kirby Dick; Dody Dorn
- Music by: Blake Leyh
- Distributed by: Cinepix Film Properties
- Release date: January 1997 (Sundance Film Festival)
- Running time: 89 minutes
- Country: United States
- Language: English

Sick: The Life and Death of Bob Flanagan, Supermasochist is a 1997 documentary film directed by Kirby Dick about Bob Flanagan, a Los Angeles writer, poet, performance artist, comic, and BDSM celebrity, who had and later died of cystic fibrosis. The film premiered at the 1997 Sundance Film Festival, where it was awarded a Special Jury Prize.

== Synopsis ==
The film chronicles Flanagan for several years leading up to his death in 1996. It explores various aspects of his life, artwork, and philosophy through interviews and other personal footage depicting Flanagan, his wife Sheree Rose, and the Flanagan family. Sick also features Flanagan's home movies, performance videos, and video diaries, as well as an excerpt of Flanagan's performance in the music video for "Happiness in Slavery" by Nine Inch Nails.

In the film, Flanagan explains his use of BDSM for sexual gratification and also as a therapeutic device to take control over his body from cystic fibrosis. He discusses his conceptual, performance, and video art, which often relates to pain, illness, medicine, and sexuality. Flanagan also serves as a camp counselor for children with cystic fibrosis and meets with a young woman with cystic fibrosis who visits him under the auspices of the Make-A-Wish Foundation.

Sick details Flanagan's lifelong struggle with cystic fibrosis, as well as his eventual death. Flanagan had agreed to participate in the film under the condition that his death be included in the final project.

== Reception ==
Sick was a surprise hit at the 1997 Sundance Film Festival, where it received a Special Jury Prize. It was also awarded the Grand Prize at the Los Angeles Film Festival. This was another surprise for Dick, who had planned to skip the awards ceremony.

Film critics responded positively to the film. Kevin Thomas of the Los Angeles Times and Roger Ebert of the Chicago Sun-Times praised the film for its careful portrayal of Flanagan's struggles and his relationship with Rose. The San Francisco Chronicle's Edward Guthmann said the film "does a remarkable thing in presenting extreme, sometimes revolting material and simultaneously making us like and admire Flanagan. True, he was a madman and exhibitionist; but he was also a gifted writer who was committed to taking risks, confronting death and living life on his own terms."

== See also ==
- Sadomasochism
- Cock and ball torture
