= Leo Zulueta =

American tattoo artist

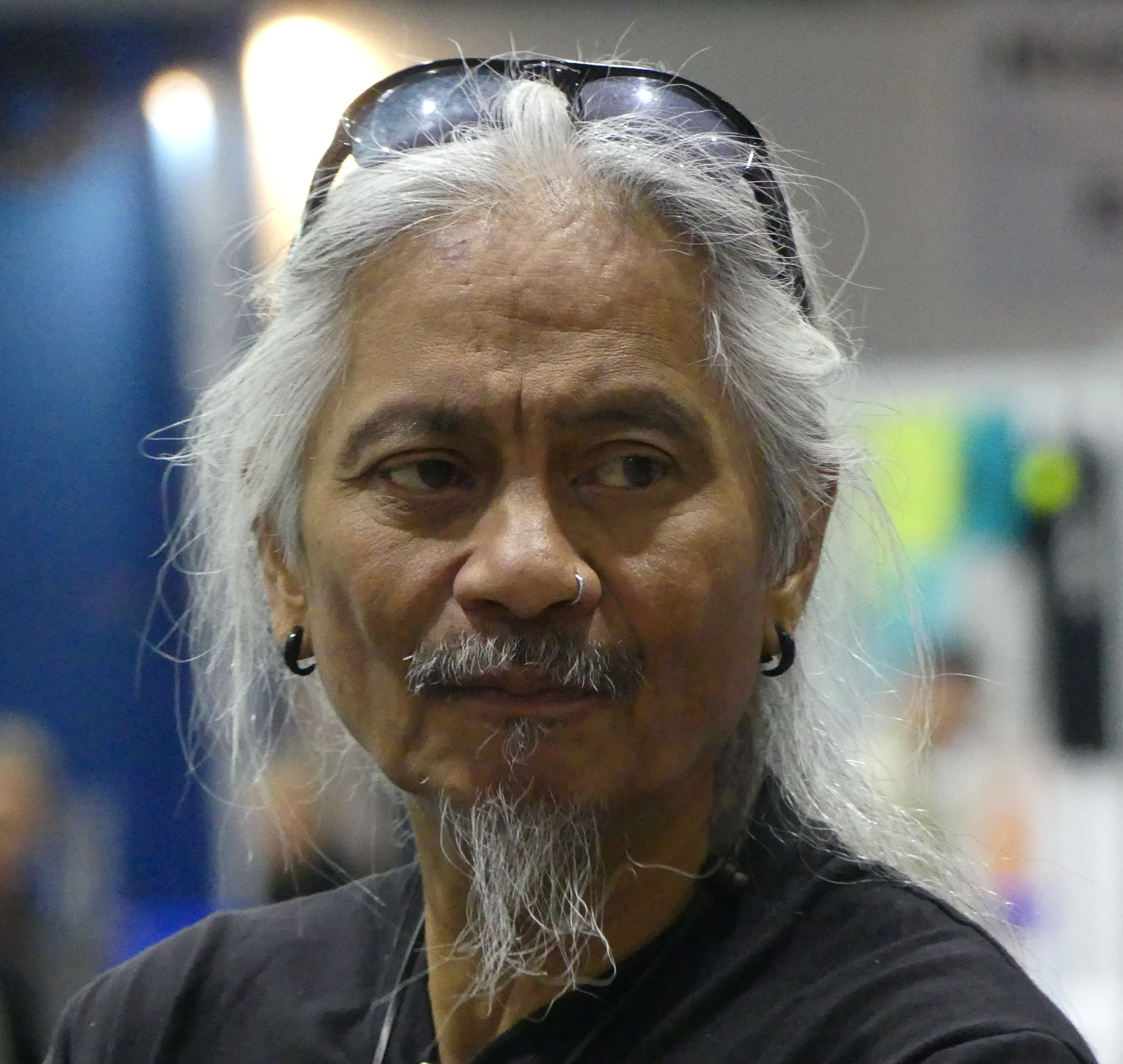
- Leo Zulueta at Spiral Tattoo. Ann Arbor, Michigan, August 2011
- Born: May 18, 1952 (age 73); Bethesda, Maryland
- Known for: Tattoo

Leo Zulueta is an American tattoo artist. He is known as the "father of modern tribal tattooing."

== Biography ==
Leo Zulueta was born in 1952 in a naval hospital in Bethesda, Maryland. He was born into a Roman Catholic Filipino American family.

Zulueta spent his early years on the island of Oahu in Hawaii and in San Diego, California. He attended San Diego State College in 1970, where he studied arts and crafts.

During the 1970s he began to explore his interest in Bornean traditional tattooing. In 1976 he met tattoo artist Don Ed Hardy, who encouraged him to become a tattooist. Zulueta started tattooing professionally in 1981.

Zulueta's style of neo-tribal tattooing has been influential to other tattoo artists. In 1989, he was featured in the RE/Search publication Modern Primitives. In 1992, Zulueta founded Black Wave Tattoo in Los Angeles, California, which he sold in 2000. In 2007, he was featured on TLC's Tattoo Wars with his protégé Rory Keating.

Zulueta currently resides in Ann Arbor, Michigan, where he operates Spiral Tattoo.
