= Greg Kulz =

American tattoo artist

- Born: 1963 (age 61–62); Fallsburg, New York, U.S.
- Education: San Francisco Art Institute
- Occupation: Tattoo artist

Greg Kulz (born 1963) is an American tattoo artist. He is based in San Francisco, California.

== Biography ==
Greg Kulz grew up in Fallsburg, New York and Florence, Italy. He attended the San Francisco Art Institute.

He helped pioneer the modern primitive movement. He is one of the first tattoo artists to specialize in biomechanical tattooing. He is also known for pioneering the tattoo inks that glow in a dark light and the ones that glow in the dark.

He became famous through being featured in V. Vale and Andrea Juno's book Modern Primitives.
