= Sheree Rose =

American photographer and performance artist

- Born: September 22, 1941 (age 84)
- Known for: photography, performance art
- Notable work: Visiting Hours
- Spouse: Bob Flanagan (m. 1989; died 1996)

Sheree Rose (born 1941) is an American photographer and performance artist. She is best known for her collaborative work with performance artist Bob Flanagan, and her photography documenting a wide range of Los Angeles subcultures, especially in relation to BDSM and body modification.

== Early life ==
Rose was raised in a Jewish family in Los Angeles. She was married in 1964, and she and her first husband both worked as teachers. In the 1970s, after divorcing, she earned a master's degree at California State University, Northridge and became active in socialist feminism, consciousness-raising groups, and the punk scene.

== Career ==
Rose used photography to document the subcultures she participated in, and was the primary photographer at Beyond Baroque Literary Arts Center in Venice, Los Angeles, where her photographic subjects included Exene Cervenka and John Doe of X, Dennis Cooper, Ed Smith, Amy Gerstler, and David Trinidad.

Rose met Bob Flanagan in 1980, and the two began a relationship both as romantic partners and close artistic collaborators that lasted until Flanagan's death in 1996. Sadomasochism was central to Rose and Flanagan's relationship, and throughout the 1980s, the two focused on BDSM community organizing and advocacy, including the formation of the Los Angeles chapter of the Society of Janus. Rose documented her life and work with Flanagan, and also photographed other performance artists, including Genesis P-Orridge (for the book Modern Primitives), Ron Athey, and others.

Rose and Flanagan's performance art, which explored BDSM, sexuality, death, and Flanagan's experience of living with cystic fibrosis, began in 1989 with the piece Nailed, presented in conjunction with the release of the RE/Search publication Modern Primitives. Visiting Hours, Rose and Flanagan's most widely toured museum exhibition, specifically explored the convergence of illness and SM and was first shown at the Santa Monica Museum of Art in 1992, combining text, video, and live performance.

Rose and Flanagan's life together is documented in the 1997 film Sick: The Life and Death of Bob Flanagan, Supermasochist, and their collected archives are maintained at the ONE National Gay & Lesbian Archives at the University of Southern California Libraries.

From 2011, Rose has worked collaboratively with British performance artist Martin O'Brien, continuing to explore themes of BDSM and cystic fibrosis.
