= Modern Primitives (book) =

Book by V. Vale

- Authors: V. Vale, Andrea Juno
- Subjects: Body modification, Cultural studies, Social Anthropology
- Publisher: RE/Search
- Publication date: 1989
- Publication place: United States
- Media type: Print
- Pages: 212
- ISBN: 978-0-940642-14-0
- OCLC: 20973712
- Dewey Decimal: 391/.65 20
- LC Class: GT2343 .M63 1989

Modern Primitives, written by V. Vale and Andrea Juno, is a RE/Search publications book about body modification, published in 1989. The book consists of a collection of twenty two interviews and two essays with individuals and key figures involved in the field of body modification in the late 1980s. It was one of the first documents to attempt to comprehensively cover the re-emergence and increasing popularity of tattooing, piercing, scarification, corsetry, sideshow, ritual and other practices in contemporary western society.

== Influence ==
At the time of its publication, Modern Primitives was the first text to attempt to comprehensively address the issues, aesthetics and meaning involved in the subject of body modification. The public knowledge of the term Modern Primitive is primarily due to the widespread popularity of this book. Many of the images in the book would have been familiar to persons involved in the movement, but the book exposed several "underground" practices to a vastly greater public, including graphic images of genital piercing and genital bisection and scarification. The book also advanced numerous urban legends regarding the history and origin of body piercing, which remain widespread to this day, most notably Doug Malloy (Richard Simonton)'s invented origins of various piercings.

The book was the subject of an obscenity trial in England. In November 1989, police seized a copy of Modern Primitives from London store The Book Inn, owned by bookseller Richard Waller. Magistrate Ian Baker ruled in 1991 that the book was not obscene. This was part of a pattern of prosecution at the time, coming shortly after Operation Spanner, which targeted practitioners of sadomasochism; one of the Spanner defendants, Anthony Oversby, had photos of piercings and tattoos he had done in Modern Primitives.

== Notable interviewees and essayists ==
- Fakir Musafar
- Don Ed Hardy
- Anton LaVey
- Leo Zulueta
- Sheree Rose
- Lyle Tuttle
- Vyvyn Lazonga
- Monte Cazazza
- Hanky Panky
- Greg Kulz
- Jim Ward
- Genesis and Paula P-Orridge

== See also ==
- Human branding
- Pearling (body modification)
