= Raw Time =

American public access show

- Genre: Music television
- Created by: Dave Prewitt
- Showrunner: Dave Prewitt
- Presented by: Dave Prewitt; Goth Princess Tinarina (Tiffy)

Production
- Production company: Zomba Recording Corporation

Original release
- Network: Austin Public Access
- Release: 1990 – 2007

Raw Time (stylized rAw TiMe) was an American public access, late-night television show that ran on Austin Public Access from 1990 to 2007. Produced and hosted by Austin public access personality Dave Prewitt, the show featured music videos of national bands, with an eclectic mix of genres. The show garnered a cult following for the call-in show segment, which had a reputation for drunk and disorderly callers: clips of the 1999 goth-dressed co-host "Tinarina" (a.k.a. "Tiffy") running the call-in segment went viral in the early 2020s.

== Production ==
The show was produced in part by Zomba Recording Corporation. The format was a music video reel inter-cut with call-in segments, hosted either by producer-host Prewitt or a co-host. The call-in segment was not screened beforehand, so the show became famous for attracting prank calls and hecklers, as well as Prewitt and his co-hosts' quick wit in responding to them.

== Accolades ==
The show received the 1994 Austin Chronicle "Best Public Access TV Show" reader's choice award, tied with Dave Prewitt's other Austin Public Access show CapZeyeZ. It was also a co-winner of the 1994 Billboard Music Video Awards "Best Local/Regional Rock Show" award.

== Legacy ==
Mike Judge of Beavis and Butthead credited Raw Time with introducing him to the music video for The Jesus Lizard's Glamorous, off 1993's EP Lash: he aired the music video in 1995 S5E18 "Party".

=== Tinarina ===
In 1999, a 16-year-old girl in goth fashion going by the stage name "Goth Princess Tinarina" or "Tiffy" began co-hosting the call-in segment for Raw Time. Tinarina garnered attention for how she handled raucous callers, particularly sexual harassment. Her stint as co-host only lasted six months. In 2017, Dave Prewitt uploaded clips of Tinarina to the Raw Time archive Youtube channel; they gained attention during the 1990s nostalgia wave of the 2020s, particularly on TikTok in 2024.

== See also ==
- Keep Austin Weird
