= RE/Search Publications =

Publisher

RE/Search
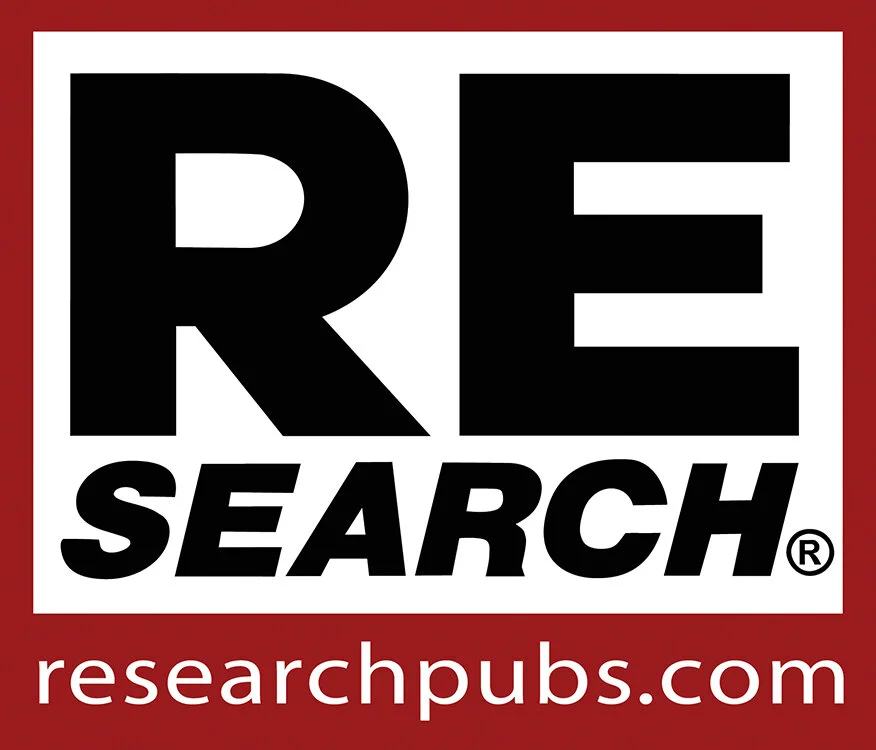
- Industry: Publishing
- Founded: 1980
- Founder: V. Vale
- Headquarters: San Francisco, United States
- Products: Books
- Website: researchpubs.com

RE/Search Publications is an American magazine and book publisher, based in San Francisco, founded by its editor V. Vale in 1980. In several issues, Andrea Juno was also credited as an editor. It was the successor to Vale's earlier punk rock fanzine Search & Destroy (1977–1979), which was started with small donations, provided to Vale by Allen Ginsberg and Lawrence Ferlinghetti. RE/Search has published tabloid-sized magazines and books. The publisher popularized a number of subcultural or countercultural topics in the 1980s and 1990s: body modification, third-wave feminism, B movies, and more.

== Search & Destroy ==
In the late 1970s, Vale was working at City Lights Bookstore, and he was deeply interested in the growing punk rock scene. He was dissatisfied with mainstream coverage of the emerging culture, so he decided to form his own independent magazine, known as a zine. Inspired by Claude Levi-Strauss, the father of structural anthropology, Vale decided to treat the magazine like an anthropological project. This meant, "...in other words, not to make any assumptions about the culture, and try and use a lot what I call 'first-hand informants." In addition, Vale was inspired by Interview magazine, which was put out by Andy Warhol. For these reasons, he chose an interview format for the magazine.

The first issue was financed through small donations. Allen Ginsberg wrote a $100 check, after a request from Vale. This was followed by $100 from Lawrence Ferlinghetti. Vale knew both writers through City Lights Bookstore. Then, he secured a $200 donation from a friend who was a doctor. The debut issue of Search & Destroy, named after the Stooges song, focused on the emerging punk and new wave scene, with articles on Mabuhay Gardens, the hottest venue for punk in the city, and interviews with the local bands Crime, Vermilion, and the Nuns. He stated in an interview, "...I sort of kept going, but I never thought I would make a living off it."

In total, eleven issues of Search & Destroy were published, between 1977 and 1979. Like many other punk cultural figures, Vale saw connections between the punk movement and dadaism and surrealism, and he sought to explore these influences in his zine. Cultural figures and groups such as William S. Burroughs, JG Ballard, Russ Meyer, Lou Reed, Patti Smith, Iggy Pop, Devo, the Clash, Talking Heads, Weirdos, and Jello Biafra were profiled. However, the staff and scene that supported Search & Destroy eventually diminished in size. Vale explained, "It took two years to build up 200 hardcore people truly into punk, so that they just got into it 100% and quit working full-time—most of them—and started bands, or publishing, or taking photos, or making posters, or making clothes, or whatever they did. Overnight they all pretty much vanished."

== Development of publishing house ==
The magazine later transformed into a publishing company, named RE/Search Publications. The first issue of RE/Search (1980) had photographs by Ruby Ray and articles on Factrix, The Slits, conspiracies (written by Jay Kinney), Young Marble Giants, Boyd Rice's NON, Cabaret Voltaire, Sun Ra, flashcards, Japan, J. G. Ballard, Julio Cortázar, rhythm & noise, Soldier of Fortune Magazine, Throbbing Gristle, nuclear disaster, Situationism, Octavio Paz, and "punk prostitutes". It was distributed by Rough Trade. Following the third issue, issues 4 and 5 were collected as a single volume, a "special book issue," with a focus on William S. Burroughs, Brion Gysin, and Throbbing Gristle. Subsequent issues all retained the book format.

During this time, Vale also launched a typesetting business, RE/Search Typography. This enabled him to fund the publishing house while managing the typography and designs of RE/Search books. He maintained the typesetting business until 1991, when he sold it so that he could focus on publishing work full-time.

In the 1980s and 1990s, RE/Search published books on various underground topics. Some titles included Pranks, Incredibly Strange Films, and Modern Primitives, and the subject matter included profiles of William S. Burroughs, the band SPK, J. G. Ballard, and others. Modern Primitives introduced many readers to piercing, tattooing, scarification, and body modification. It included interviews with Fakir Musafar, Ed Hardy, Lyle Tuttle, Leo Zulueta, Bill Salmon, and Vyvyn Lazonga, among others. Angry Women was an influential feminist book, and it was read in many college classes. It included interviews with Diamanda Galas, Lydia Lunch, Karen Finley, Susie Bright, Annie Sprinkle, Kathy Acker, bell hooks, and Wanda Coleman. Freaks explored "circus freak" culture, while Bob Flanagan: Supermasochist profiled Bob Flanagan, a performance artist and masochist with cystic fibrosis.

Furthermore, RE/Search book explored "weird" culture. Incredibly Strange Films helped introduce audiences to Russ Meyer and Herschell Gordon Lewis. Incredibly Strange Music helped introduce audiences to Yma Sumac and Ken Nordine.

In later publications, RE/Search explored topics such as artificial intelligence, Burning Man, and Timothy Leary.

RE/Search was the subject of a special issue of the European Journal of American Studies (August 2011, Vol. 30 issue 2), including an examination of "the growth and decline of RE/Search as a commercial enterprise dedicated to documenting and, in effect, marketing selected countercultural trends."

Both artist and musician Florian-Ayala Fauna and science fiction author Bruce Sterling are sponsors for the RE/Search newsletter.

== Influence ==
RE/Search books have influenced many writers, activists, and artists. Michelle Tea cited Angry Women as an early inspiration for her. The book Modern Primitives "... changed countless lives, bringing what had been a localized and niche set of body modification practices, aesthetics and philosophies out of San Francisco to a global audience, dominating scholarly and popular discourse around body modification subculture for more than a decade afterwards," as written in European Journal of American Culture (2011). Jello Biafra has also called Modern Primitives an influential book.

== Select bibliography ==
=== Search & Destroy ===
- Search & Destroy #1–11: Tabloid format zine. RE/Search Publications, 1977–1979.

=== RE/Search numbered volumes ===
- RE/Search #1,2 and 3: Tabloid format zine. RE/Search Publications, 1980–1981.
- RE/Search #4/5: William S. Burroughs/Brion Gysin/Throbbing Gristle. RE/Search Publications, 1982. ISBN 0-9650469-1-5
- RE/Search #6/7: Industrial Culture Handbook. RE/Search Publications, 1983. ISBN 0-940642-07-7
- RE/Search #6/7: Industrial Culture Handbook, Limited Hardback Edition. RE/Search Publications, 2006. ISBN 978-1-889307-16-9
- RE/Search #8/9: J. G. Ballard. RE/Search Publications, 1984. ISBN 0-940642-08-5
- RE/Search #10: Incredibly Strange Films RE/Search Publications, 1986. ISBN 0-940642-09-3
- RE/Search #11: Pranks!. RE/Search Publications, 1986. ISBN 0-9650469-8-2
- RE/Search #12: Modern Primitives. RE/Search Publications, 1989. ISBN 0-940642-14-X
- RE/Search #13: Angry Women. RE/Search Publications, 1992. ISBN 0-940642-24-7
- RE/Search #14: Incredibly Strange Music Vol. I. RE/Search Publications, 1993. ISBN 0-940642-22-0
- RE/Search #15: Incredibly Strange Music Vol. II. RE/Search Publications, 1994. ISBN 0-940642-21-2
- RE/Search #16: The RE/Search Guide to Bodily Fluids, Paul Spinrad 1994. ISBN 0-940642-28-X reissued by Juno Books 1999. ISBN 1-890451-04-5

=== Other RE/Search titles ===
- The Atrocity Exhibition, J. G. Ballard. Revised large-format paperback edition, with annotations by the author and illustrations by Phoebe Gloeckner. RE/Search Publications, 1990. ISBN 0-940642-18-2
- Bob Flanagan: Super Masochist, Bob Flanagan, 1993. ISBN 0-940642-25-5
- Freaks: We Who Are Not As Others, Daniel P. Mannix ISBN 0-9651042-5-7
- Modern Pagans - An Investigation of Contemporary Ritual, 2001 ISBN 1-889307-10-6
- Punk '77, James Stark, 2006. ISBN 1-889307-14-9
- V. Vale (Ed.) (1997) Zines Vol. I. ISBN 0-9650469-0-7
- V. Vale (Ed.) (1997) Zines Vol. II. ISBN 0-9650469-2-3
- V. Vale (Ed.) (1997) Search & Destroy Volume I: Issues 1-6. ISBN 1-889307-00-9
- V. Vale (Ed.) (1997) Search & Destroy Volume II: Issues 7-11. ISBN 0-9650469-4-X
- V. Vale (ed.) (2001) Real Conversations No. 1. ISBN 1-889307-09-2
- V.Vale & J. Sulak (2001) Modern Pagans: an investigation of contemporary practices. San Francisco: RE/Search Publications. ISBN 978-1-889307-10-7
- V. Vale (Ed.) (2005). J.G. Ballard: Conversations" (excerpts). RE/Search Publications. ISBN 1-889307-13-0
- V. Vale (Ed.) and Mike Ryan (Ed). (2005). J.G. Ballard: Quotes (excerpts). RE/Search Publications. ISBN 1-889307-12-2
