= Gary Talpas =

American art director and photographer

- The NIN logo designed by Trent Reznor and Gary Talpas
- Occupations: Art Director, Photographer

Gary Talpas is an American art director and photographer. Talpas worked as designer and art director for Nine Inch Nails on Pretty Hate Machine, "Head Like A Hole", The Downward Spiral and Further Down the Spiral. He also played keyboards for several early shows during the Pretty Hate Machine tour after Chris Vrenna switched to drums.

Talpas would later develop artwork for Smells Like Children for Marilyn Manson.
