= Wish (Nine Inch Nails song) =

Promotional single by Nine Inch Nails

from the EP Broken
- Written: 1991
- Released: 1992
- Recorded: 1992
- Genre: Alternative metal; industrial metal
- Length: 3:47
- Label: Nothing; TVT; Interscope; Atlantic
- Songwriter: Trent Reznor
- Producers: Flood; Trent Reznor

Nine Inch Nails singles chronology
"Happiness in Slavery" (1992)	"Wish" (1992)	"March of the Pigs" (1994)

Music video
- "Nine Inch Nails - Wish" on YouTube

"Wish" is a song by American industrial rock band Nine Inch Nails from their debut EP Broken (1992). It was released in 1992 as a promotional single from the EP. The drumming on the track was performed by Martin Atkins.

"Wish" was remixed twice for the companion disc to the EP, Fixed, as "Wish (Remix)" and "Fist Fuck". Both remixes were produced by J. G. Thirlwell.

"Wish" won the Grammy Award for Best Metal Performance in 1993. Referencing a lyric from the song, Trent Reznor later joked that his epitaph should read: "REZNOR: Died. Said 'fist fuck' and won a Grammy." In 2020, Kerrang and Billboard ranked the song number one and number four, respectively, on their lists of the greatest Nine Inch Nails songs.

== Music video ==
Nine Inch Nails playing inside of a cage in the "Wish" music video

The music video for "Wish" was directed by Peter Christopherson, who also directed the music video for "March of the Pigs" and Broken's eponymous film. The video shows Nine Inch Nails (Trent Reznor on vocals, Chris Vrenna on drums, Richard Patrick on guitar and James Woolley on keyboards) playing inside high, caged walls while hordes of angry men assault the exterior of the cage. The band is eventually accosted: Woolley is lifted off his feet by a suspended man, Vrenna is lifted off by a crane hook and Patrick is grabbed through the sides of the cage. The video ends with a brief scene of men breaking open the gate of the cage and storming into the cage with bats and clubs. MTV felt that the ending scene was too violent and alternate footage was used for network airplay.

A second video is a live performance filmed by Simon Maxwell in 1995 and was released on Closure in 1997. This performance was taken from a concert film originally intended for release in 1996, but was subsequently shelved because Reznor was not satisfied with the final product.

== Track listings ==
- US promotional CD single
1. "Wish" (No Bad Words Mix) – 3:37
- US promotional 12" single

A1. "Wish" (Fixed version) – 9:08
A2. "Wish" (Broken version) – 3:47
B1. "Wish" (Fixed version) – 9:08
B2. "Wish" (Broken version) – 3:47

- UK promotional CD-R single
1. "Wish" (radio version) – 3:51
- UK promotional 7" single

A. "Wish" (radio edit) – 3:37

== Personnel ==
Personnel taken from the CD booklet for Broken.

- Trent Reznor – performance, production
- Flood – production
- Martin Atkins – drums

== Charts ==
Chart (1993)	Peak position
US Alternative Airplay (Billboard)	25

== Cover versions ==
- 10 year old singer Zoë Franziska of O'Keefe Music Foundation covered the song in 2024 and it was positively reviewed by Rolling Stone Magazine
- Silverstein covered the song in 2010 for their EP Transitions.
- The Dillinger Escape Plan covered the song on their EP Plagiarism and were asked to join Nine Inch Nails in performing the song during two stops of the 2009 Australian Soundwave Festival and later at Bonaroo 2009 and also on September 10, 2009 in Los Angeles.
- The song can be found on German Beatsteaks 2002 Wohnzimmer EP.
- Behemoth also covered "Wish" on their 2003 EP, Conjuration.
- Linkin Park performed the song live on their spring 2004 tour. It was also covered on that year's Projekt Revolution tour where one recording was later released on the Linkin Park Underground 4.0 fanclub CD.
- STEMM covered the song on their 2008 album Blood Scent.
- Brand New covered the song live during their spring 2011 tour.
- Device covered the song on the deluxe edition of their 2013 debut album Device.
