= Bob Flanagan (performance artist) =

American writer, poet, musician, performance artist, and comic

- Born: December 26, 1952; New York City
- Died: January 4, 1996 (aged 43); Long Beach, California
- Resting place: Forest Lawn Memorial Park (Long Beach)
- Known for: sadomasochism, performance art, cystic fibrosis activism
- Notable work: Why, Visiting Hours, SICK
- Spouse: Sheree Rose (1989–1996)

Bob Flanagan (December 26, 1952 – January 4, 1996) was an American performance artist and writer known for his work on sadomasochism and living with cystic fibrosis.

== Early life ==
Flanagan was born in New York City on December 26, 1952, and grew up in Costa Mesa, California, with his mother, Kathy; father, Robert; brothers John and Tim; and sister, Patricia. In childhood, Flanagan was diagnosed with cystic fibrosis. His sister, Patricia, died at age 21 of the same illness, which also claimed the life of his second sister, who died soon after birth. At age 14, in 1967, Flanagan was named the first poster child for the North Orange County chapter of the National Cystic Fibrosis Research Foundation.

Flanagan graduated from Costa Mesa High School, and studied literature at California State University, Long Beach and the University of California, Irvine. He moved to Los Angeles in 1976.

== Career ==
Flanagan began reading his poems around Southern California in the mid-1970s, and was part of the poetry community at Beyond Baroque Literary Arts Center. He published his first book, The Kid is the Man, with Bombshelter Press in 1978.

Flanagan met Sheree Rose in 1980, and collaborated closely with her for the rest of his life. Through the 1980s, Flanagan and Rose focused on BDSM community education and organizing, and were founding members of the Los Angeles chapter of the Society of Janus. Their work in performance art began with the 1989 piece Nailed, presented in conjunction with the release of the RE/Search publication Modern Primitives. In Nailed, Flanagan nailed his penis and scrotum to a board while singing "If I Had a Hammer".

Visiting Hours, first shown at the Santa Monica Museum of Art in 1992, combined text, video, and live performance, and explored the convergence of illness and SM. It was Flanagan's most widely toured museum exhibition. Included in Visiting Hours was a piece created in 1991 titled The Scaffold—a video presentation which showcased video footage of various parts of Bob's body, ranging from his hands, head, abdomen, genitals, and his feet, all on their own respective monitors. In the center of the gallery, Flanagan lay in a hospital bed and interacted with museum visitors for the duration of the exhibit. According to curator Laura Trippi, "The installation is designed like a crazy stage set of a children's residential hospital, replete with a torture chamber lurking amidst the institutional cheer."

In 1996, Flanagan received the Steve Maidhof Award for National or International Work from the National Leather Association International.

== Music videos ==
Flanagan being tortured in the almost universally banned Nine Inch Nails music video for "Happiness in Slavery"

Flanagan is featured in the widely banned music video for the song "Happiness in Slavery" by Nine Inch Nails. In the video, a nude Flanagan is bound to a mechanical torture device which pierces his flesh, pulls on his nipples and penis with pincers, crushes his genitals with a paddle, and ultimately kills him. Apart from his onscreen "death", all of the acts inflicted on Flanagan in the video are unsimulated.

In 1993, Flanagan appeared in the video for the Danzig song "It's Coming Down". In the uncensored version of the video (near the ending), Flanagan pierces his upper and lower lips together and then he hammers a nail through the head of his penis before bleeding on the lens of the camera recording him.

Flanagan also had a small role in Godflesh's "Crush My Soul" video, as an upside-down suspended Christ, hoisted on to the ceiling of a church by Sheree Rose.

== Death ==
On January 4, 1996, Flanagan died from complications due to cystic fibrosis at 43. He was survived by his wife and close artistic collaborator Sheree Rose. His body now lies in the chapel of Forest Lawn Cemetery.

The final years of Flanagan's life, including his death, are the subject of the Kirby Dick documentary Sick: The Life and Death of Bob Flanagan, Supermasochist. Flanagan's participation in the film was contingent upon his death being part of the completed project.

== Selected works ==
- Visiting Hours: An Installation by Bob Flanagan in collaboration with Sheree Rose, Santa Monica Museum of Art and the New Museum, 1994 In Visiting Hours, Flanagan transformed a space at the Santa Monica Museum of Art into a medical clinic, complete with waiting room furniture, potted plants and copies of Highlights For Children magazine.
- A Matter of Choice, in collaboration with Sheree Rose, Los Angeles Contemporary Exhibitions, July 1992
- Bob Flanagan at the Movies, Artists' Television Access, San Francisco, April 18, 1992
- Bob Flanagan's Sick, Art in the Anchorage, New York, August 1991 Sick is a voice-over reading the actual ''contract'' that the two (Sheree Rose and Bob Flanagan) drew up, which details their mistress/slave agreement.
- Tell Me What to Do: An Improvisational Reading and Performance, Beyond Baroque Literary Arts Center, Venice, August 14, 1987

== Partial bibliography ==
- The Kid Is the Man (1978)
- The Wedding of Everything (Sherwood Press, 1983)
- Slave Sonnets (Cold Calm Press, 1986)
- Fuck Journal (Hanuman Books, 1988)
- A Taste of Honey with David Trinidad (1990)
- Bob Flanagan: Supermasochist (RE/Search, 1993) (interviews)
- Pain Journal (1996)
- The Book of Medicine (incomplete manuscript, published posthumously in 2017)
- Fun to be Dead (2024)
