= Happiness in Slavery =

Promotional single by Nine Inch Nails

from the EP Broken
- Released: 1992
- Genre: Industrial dance
- Length: 5:21
- Label: Interscope; Nothing; TVT
- Songwriter: Trent Reznor
- Producer: Trent Reznor

Nine Inch Nails singles chronology
| "Sin" (1990) | "Happiness in Slavery" (1992) | "Wish" (1992) |

"Happiness in Slavery" is a song by American industrial rock band Nine Inch Nails. It was released as a promotional single from the band's first EP and second major release, Broken (1992). The song takes its title from Jean Paulhan's preface to Pauline Réage's 1954 erotic novel Story of O.

"Happiness in Slavery" peaked at No. 13 on Billboard's Modern Rock Tracks chart. Nine Inch Nails' performance of "Happiness in Slavery" at Woodstock '94, included on the concert's compilation album, won the Grammy Award for Best Metal Performance in 1996. The song's music video was almost universally banned for its depiction of Bob Flanagan being tortured by a machine.

== Music video ==
Bob Flanagan being tortured in the video

The music video for "Happiness in Slavery", directed by Jon Reiss, was inspired by the 1899 novel The Torture Garden by French author Octave Mirbeau. It features performance artist Bob Flanagan entering a large room, placing a flower and a candle on an altar. He then removes all of his clothing and washes himself before lying down on a machine that straps him in. Long robotic claws arise from the machine and subsequently tear apart his skin and impale his hands. He reacts with pleasure as this occurs. There are also drills that drill into his skin in various places and let his blood drip onto the floor beneath, where there is a garden apparently being fertilized by human blood.

Later in the video, large grinders emerge from the machine to cause extreme injury to the man's skin. As he continues to scream in a mixture of pleasure and pain, the machine begins to disembowel him, ultimately killing him. It then engulfs the man's body in a metal cask and minces it into fertilizer for the garden below. At the end, Trent Reznor, who had been singing the lyrics inside a cell at the beginning of the video, enters the room and begins to perform the same ritual that the previous man had performed, the video fading to black as he lights a candle.

The video was almost universally banned once released, but was later included on the Closure video album and in the Broken film. It was featured on Too Much 4 Much, MuchMusic's showcase of videos banned from their regular programming.

It cost about $55,000 to make the video in 1993. To imitate the insides of a person, the crew used mashed up bananas mixed with chocolate. Reznor commented that the video was not created for shock value, but because "these were the most appropriate visuals for the song." It had to do with his artistic freedom at the time after his fallout with TVT Records.

== Track listings ==
- US promotional CD single (PRCD 4795)
1. "Happiness in Slavery" (LP version) – 5:26
- US promotional CD single (PRCD 4827)
1. "Happiness in Slavery" (Flaccid edit) – 4:17
2. "Happiness in Slavery" (LP version) – 5:26
- US promotional 12" single

A1. "Happiness in Slavery" (Fixed version) – 6:09
A2. "Happiness in Slavery" (Sherwood Slave Mix) – 2:17
B1. "Happiness in Slavery" (PK Slavery Remix) – 5:41
B2. "Happiness in Slavery" (Broken version) – 5:21

== Charts ==
| Chart (1992) | Peak position |
|---|---|
| US Alternative Airplay (Billboard) | 13 |
