= Campaign timeline of Year Zero =

Alternate reality game timeline

The following is a campaign timeline of the Year Zero alternate reality game. The Year Zero alternate reality game, and its accompanying concept album of the same name, criticizes the United States government's policies as of 2007, projecting a dystopian vision of its impact on the state of events in 2022. The game began in mid-February 2007 and seems to have wrapped up in April shortly after the album came out.

== February 2007 ==
February 12, 2007
- Fans found that a new Nine Inch Nails tour T-shirt contained highlighted letters that spell out the words "I am trying to believe." It was discovered that iamtryingtobelieve.com was registered as a website, and soon several related websites were found in the IP range (Another Version of the Truth, Be the Hammer, 105th Airborne Crusaders, and Church of Plano), all describing a dystopian vision of the world fifteen years in the future.
- Consolidated Mail Systems was found through reference on the Another Version of the Truth forums.
February 14, 2007
- During Nine Inch Nails' first ever concert in Lisbon, Portugal, a USB flash drive was found in a bathroom stall containing a high-quality MP3 of the track "My Violent Heart", which quickly circulated on the internet. This was initially thought by many to be an accidental leak of the song, but further releases in a similar fashion confirmed these to be intentional "leaks" and as part of the overall alternate reality game. On the end of the MP3 was a few seconds of static, which, when analyzed under a spectrogram reveals an image of "The Presence." The same static is on the album at the end of Track #9, "The Warning".

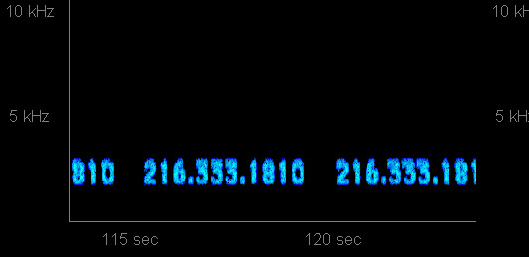
Spectrogram analysis of "2432.mp3."

February 19, 2007
- A USB drive was found at a concert in Barcelona, Spain, containing two audio files: the track "Me, I'm Not" and an MP3 of static. The mp3 of static, "2432.mp3," when analyzed through a spectrogram revealed the phone number 1-216-333-1810, which contained a recording of a conversation between a mother and her daughter, Mia, who is trapped at the Star Chamber after an individual who had been infected with the Red Horse virus entered the building. This phone number in turn revealed www.uswiretap.com/case_number_required/.

February 22, 2007
- A teaser trailer was released through the Year Zero website and featured a quick glimpse of a blue road sign that says "I AM TRYING TO BELIEVE" and a distorted glimpse of The Presence. Additionally, one frame in the teaser points to the url yearzero.nin.com/0024/, which presented an image named "yearzero_cover.jpg", which was later confirmed to be the album cover.

- Red fliers are handed out at a concert in Paris, France with the words "Art is Resistance," leading to http://artisresistance.com
February 25, 2007
- A third USB drive was found at a concert in Manchester, England. It contained two files: the track "In This Twilight" and an image of the Hollywood Sign apparently demolished. The picture led fans to a website called hollywoodinmemoriam.org/.

February 26 and 27, 2007
- Beside You in Time is released in Europe and worldwide, respectively, containing a reference to www.securebroadcastinformatics.com/ within the expiration-date lettering on the Blu-ray and HD DVD editions.

== March 2007 ==
March 7, 2007
- The music video for the first single from Year Zero, "Survivalism," was released via USB pen drives at a concert in Carling Academy Brixton in London, England. These drives contained low and high resolution versions of the video, which were quickly dispersed onto the internet and eventually officially on the Year-Zero mini-site. The numerous displays within the music video all display time code, which fans discovered contained letters leading to www.thewaterturnedtoblood.net/. The video also led to the discovery of www.judsonogram.net/, which in turn makes a mention to Cedocore, leading to www.cedocore.com

Reznor in front of the London billboard on March 13.

March 11, 2007
- Fliers were handed out at a Nine Inch Nails show in London, which had directions to a local bridge, which underneath housed a billboard with the words "Operation Swamp 0000," pointing to the website www.operationswamp0000.net/, which in turn directs users to www.operationchipsweep.net/.
- During a listening party, lithographs were handed out to people who had pre-ordered the album. These lithographs had the words "The Mailstrom" written across them, leading fans to http://www.themailstrom.com.
- Cryptic e-mails were randomly sent to many Nine Inch Nails fans, revealing http://www.thepriceoftreason.net and http://www.opensourceresistance.net.

March 13, 2007
- "Survivalism" is released on the official Year Zero site in GarageBand format. Within the files was one mysterious file named "Our End Trip," which revealed the case number 6455da04 for Judson Ogram Correctional Facility website, leading to this case file.

March 24, 2007
- "Survivalism" lyrics are released on the official Year Zero site in PDF format.

== April 2007 ==
April 4, 2007
- Year Zero album is made available for streaming play on the official Year Zero mini-site.
- A computerized voice on Track #13, "The Great Destroyer", when the left and right stereo channels are combined into a single mono signal, vocalizes the words "red horse vector," leading to www.redhorsevector.net
- Morse code in Track #14, "Another Version of the Truth", is discovered to spell out "grace the teacher," pointing towards www.gracetheteacher.net 2007

April 10, 2007
- Year Zero album is made available for streaming play on the official Nine Inch Nails MySpace page.

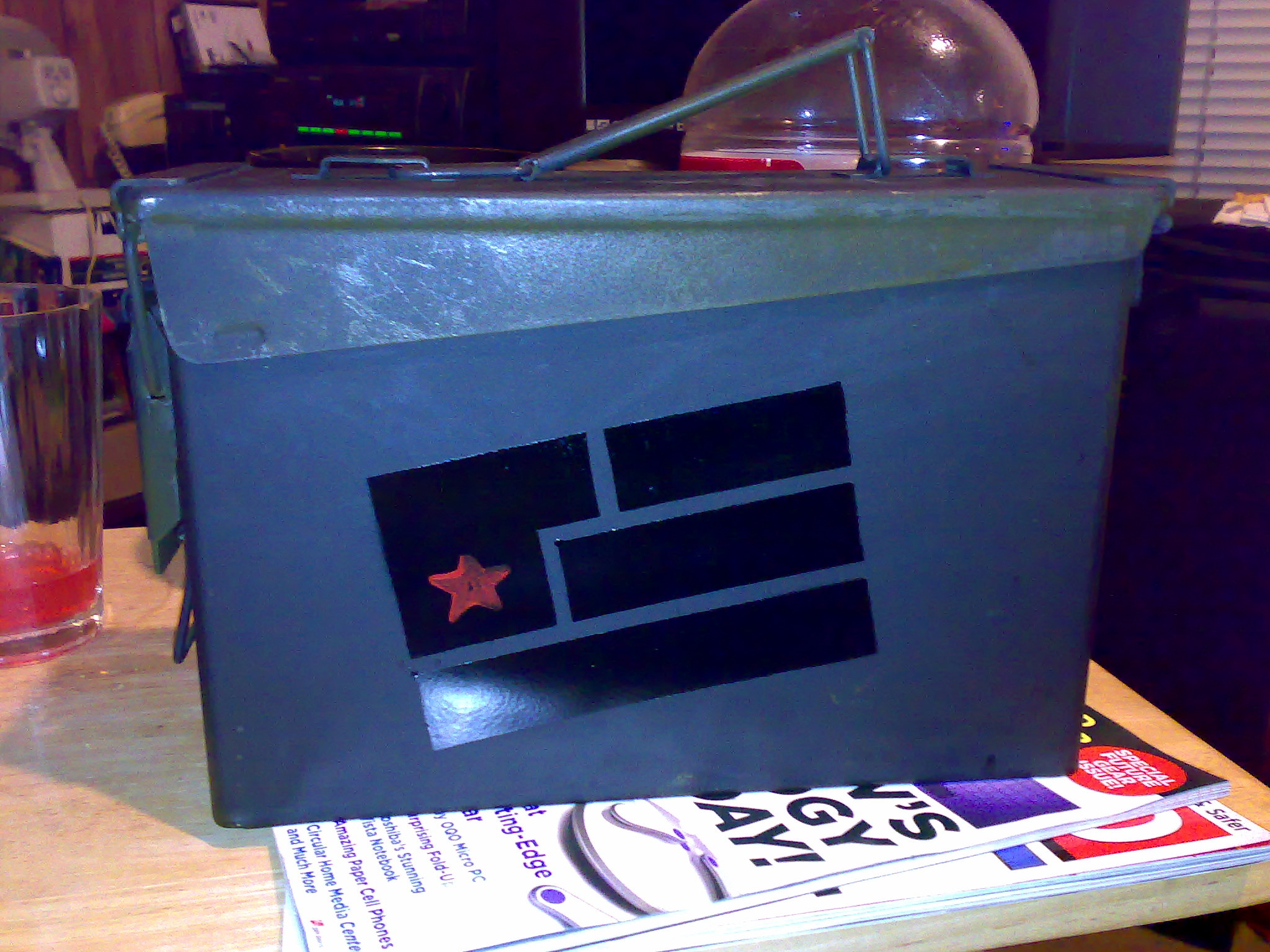
An Art is Resistance kit handed out on April 13 in L.A.

April 13, 2007
- Art is Resistance "meeting" scheduled in Los Angeles, California, posted on Open Source Resistance. Participants are asked to "Wear something that shows you’re one of us." Art is Resistance kits are handed out to those attending, consisting of Art is Resistance buttons, posters, stencils, bandannas, and in around 25 cases, pre-paid cell phones on which participants would receive in-game phone calls and become a part of the game.

April 13, 14, 16, 17, and 25, 2007
- The Year Zero album is released in Europe, Australia, the United Kingdom, the United States, and Japan respectively. The album is released in digipak packaging, which contains a sticker advertising 1-866-445-6580, a thermochrome CD face which, when heated, reveals a binary sequence which leads to exterminal.net/, as well as various other clues leading to freerebelart.net/, www.viabilityindex.com/, and this Wreckage/Shard combination for The Mailstrom.

April 18, 2007
- Resistance "meeting" scheduled in Los Angeles. Participants are invited via cell phones given to them in Art is Resistance kits on April 13. The meeting consists of a speech by a "resistance member" and a free concert by Nine Inch Nails. The concert is cut short as the meeting is "raided" by a SWAT team. Unedited video of the entire meeting is posted on Open Source Resistance the same night, and an edited version two nights later.

April 26, 2007
- "Capital G", "My Violent Heart", and "Me, I'm Not" are released on the official Nine Inch Nails website in GarageBand/Logic Pro and torrent format. Some files included, under spectrogram analysis, contain hints leading to the discovery of Exhibit Twenty Four.

April 27, 2007
- Art is Resistance "members" receive automated phone calls on cell phones given to them in Art is Resistance kits on April 13 in Los Angeles. The pre-recorded message contains a clue leading to Hour of Arrival. The message marks the end of the alternate reality game, stating "we've got to go dark for a while, but that is ok - you don't need us anymore."
