= Nine Inch Nails live performances =

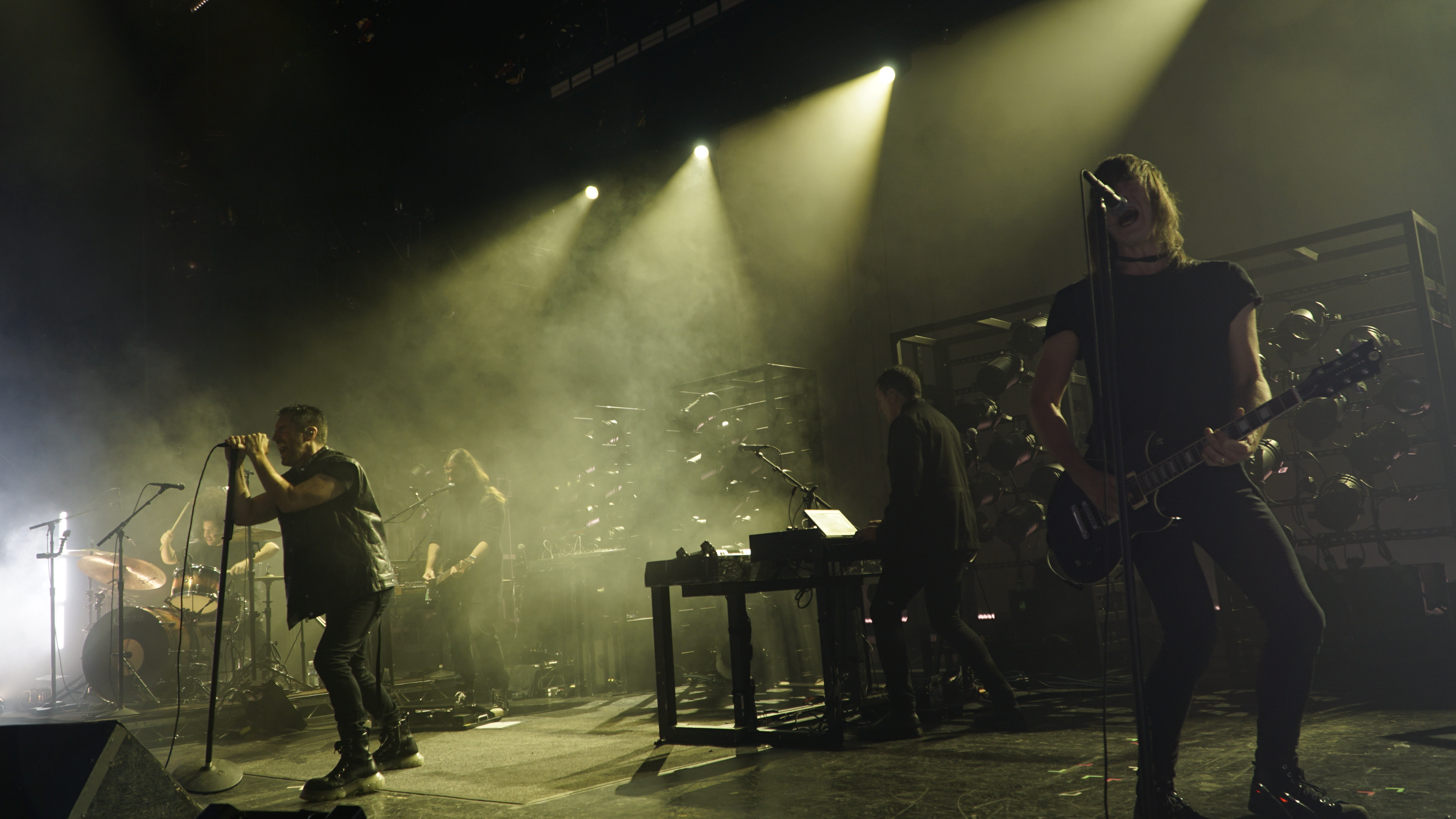
Nine Inch Nails performing in June 2022; from left to right: Ilan Rubin, Trent Reznor, Alessandro Cortini, Atticus Ross, and Robin Finck.

Nine Inch Nails, an American industrial rock band fronted by Trent Reznor, has toured all over the world since its creation in 1988. While Reznor—the only official member until the addition of Atticus Ross in 2016—controls its creative and musical direction in the studio, the touring band performs different arrangements of the songs. In addition to regular concerts, the band has performed in both supporting and headlining roles at festivals such as Woodstock '94, Lollapalooza 1991 and 2008, and many other one-off performances including the MTV Video Music Awards. Prior to their 2013 tour, the band had played 938 gigs.

Nine Inch Nails' live performances contrast with its in-studio counterpart. Reznor writes and performs nearly all Nine Inch Nails studio material, with occasional instrumental and vocal contributions from other artists. However, Reznor has typically assembled groups of backing musicians to interpret songs for tours and other live performances. Keyboardist Alessandro Cortini said that "if you see the show and you're used to the CDs it's pretty clear that the studio entity is different from the live entity".

The only constant member of the live band is Reznor. Live Nine Inch Nails performances are typically accompanied by lighting, stage, and video projection effects. From 2005–2014, Rob Sheridan assisted Reznor with the visual design components of live shows. Three tours have been chronicled on live albums and tour documentaries.

Critical and commercial response to Nine Inch Nails live performances has generally been positive. Critics have pointed to the concerts' aggressive on-stage dynamic and visual designs as high points. Reznor decided in 2008 to cease touring with the band after a 2009 farewell tour. The band resumed touring in 2013, with the group planning a set of concerts in the U.S. beginning September 28.

== History ==
=== Pretty Hate Machine Tour Series (1988–1991) ===
I could have just gone out with tape machines or 50 keyboards or whatever and recreated the sound of the record, but I'm much more interested in the challenge of having 4 musicians interpret what was initially composed by one person on a computer ... The record and the shows are quite different.

— Reznor in a 1991 interview

Reznor assembled the first live line-up in 1988 to support the Canadian industrial music band Skinny Puppy on tour. The three-piece band consisted of Reznor on guitars and lead vocals, Ron Musarra on drums, and Chris Vrenna on keyboards. The band was only scheduled to play for the last six dates of Skinny Puppy's U.S. tour, and they self-described the performances as "rough". After the Skinny Puppy tour, the band was rearranged and expanded to include a fourth member; Musarra departed and Vrenna moved to drums, Gary Talpas, Nick Rushe, and later David Hymes contributed on keyboards, while Richard Patrick was added as guitarist.

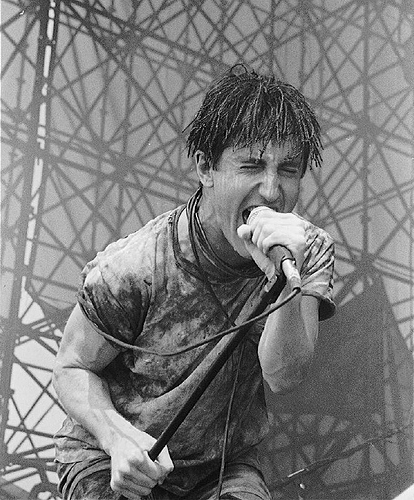
Reznor during the Lollapalooza tour, 1991

Nine Inch Nails toured North America as an opening act for The Jesus and Mary Chain in 1990, and later for Peter Murphy. During these tours, Reznor began to smash equipment while on stage, and Rockbeat interviewer Mike Gitter attributed the band's early success to this aggressive attitude. Later in 1990, the band undertook a nationwide headlining tour that continued through the first Lollapalooza festival in 1991, where, according to biographer Martin Huxley, they "stole the show". New Musical Express had a sentiment after the performance, describing the show as "genuinely frightening", and asking the reader to "decide for yourself if it's choreographed chaos or unbridled grievous bodily harm". Nine Inch Nails was then invited to open for Guns N' Roses on their European Tour, though they were reportedly poorly received. Before the Lollapalooza date, Chris Vrenna left the band due to a falling out with Reznor, and was replaced for the remainder of the tour by drummer Jeff Ward. Vrenna would rejoin the band for the Self-Destruct tour in 1994. At the conclusion of the Pretty Hate Machine tour, Richard Patrick left the group to form his own band, Filter.

=== Self-Destruct / Further Down the Spiral / Dissonance (1994–1995) ===
After the 1994 release of The Downward Spiral, the live band embarked on the Self-Destruct tour in support of the album. Chris Vrenna and James Woolley performed drums and keyboards respectively, Robin Finck replaced Richard Patrick on guitar and bassist Danny Lohner was added to the line-up. The stage set-up consisted of dirty curtains which would be pulled down for visuals shown during songs such as "Hurt". The back of the stage was littered with darker and standing lights, along with very little actual ones. The tour debuted the band's grungy and messy image in which they would come out in ragged clothes slathered in corn starch. The concerts were violent and chaotic, with band members often injuring themselves. They would frequently destroy their instruments at the end of concerts, attack each other, and stage-dive into the crowd.

The tour included a set at Woodstock '94, broadcast on Pay-per-view and seen in as many as 24 million homes. The band being covered in mud was the result of intentional planning, though for decades, the official narrative the band gave the media was that it was spontaneous pre-concert backstage play, with Reznor pushing Lohner into the mud pit before the concert began, and the whole band having a mud fight. Nine Inch Nails was widely proclaimed to have "stolen the show" from its popular contemporaries, mostly classic rock bands, and its fan base expanded. The band received considerable mainstream success thereafter, performing with significantly higher production values and the addition of various theatrical visual elements. Its performance of "Happiness in Slavery" from the Woodstock concert earned the group a Grammy Award for Best Metal Performance in 1995. Entertainment Weekly commented about the band's Woodstock '94 performance: "Reznor unstrings rock to its horrifying, melodramatic core—an experience as draining as it is exhilarating". Despite this acclaim, Reznor attributed his dislike of the concert to its technical difficulties.

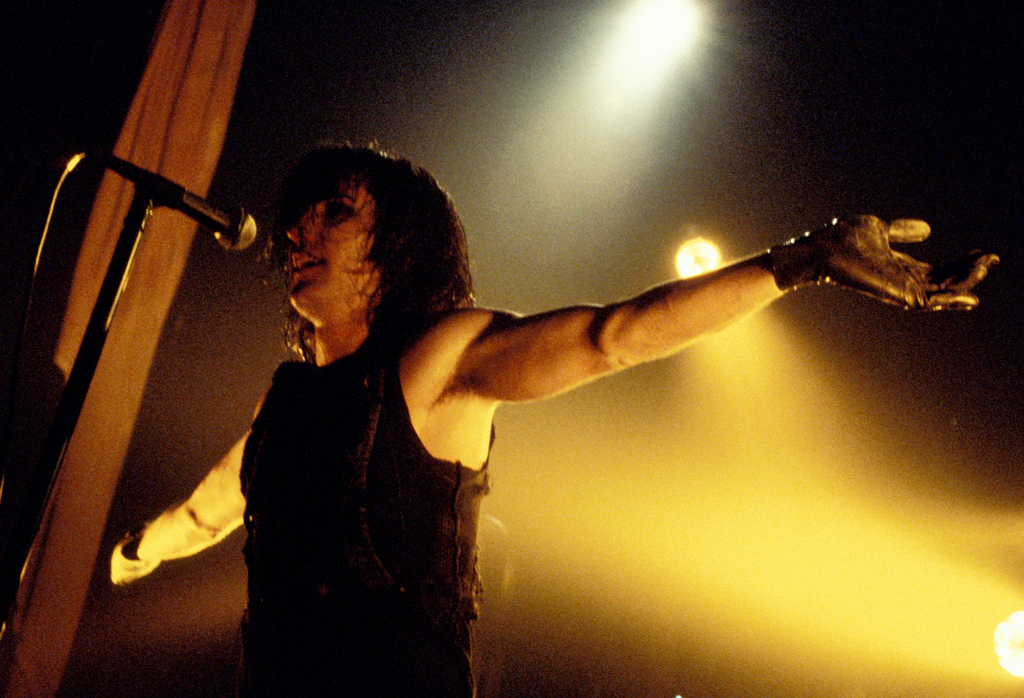
Reznor performing during the Self-Destruct tour, c. 1994–1995

The first leg of the tour featured Marilyn Manson as the supporting act, who Reznor had recently signed to his Nothing Records label. At the time, Marilyn Manson featured bassist Jeordie White (then playing under the pseudonym "Twiggy Ramirez"), who would later play bass with Nine Inch Nails from 2005 to 2007. After a larger arena tour leg called Further Down the Spiral, Nine Inch Nails performed at the Alternative Nation Festival in Australia and subsequently embarked on the Dissonance Tour, which included 26 separate performances with co-headliner David Bowie. Nine Inch Nails was the opening act for the tour, and its set transitioned into Bowie's set with joint performances of both bands' songs. However, the crowds reportedly did not respond positively to the pairing due to their different musical styles. Following the end of the Dissonance Tour, the band played a handful of club shows with Helmet as support. Finck departed the band after the conclusion of this leg.

The tour concluded with "Nights of Nothing", a three-night showcase of performances from Nothing Records bands Marilyn Manson, Prick, Meat Beat Manifesto, and Pop Will Eat Itself, which ended with an 80-minute set from Nine Inch Nails. Kerrang! described the Nine Inch Nails set during the Nights of Nothing showcase as "tight, brash and dramatic", but was disappointed at the lack of new material. Kevin McMahon filled in for the departed Finck on guitar. On the second of the three nights, Richard Patrick was briefly reunited with the band and contributed guitar to a performance of "Head Like a Hole". After the Self Destruct tour, Chris Vrenna, member of the live band since 1988 and frequent contributor to Nine Inch Nails studio recordings, left the act permanently to pursue a career in producing and to form Tweaker.

=== Fragility v1.0 / Fragility v2.0 (1999–2000) ===
In support of Nine Inch Nails' third full-length studio album, The Fragile, the live-band reformed for the Fragility tour. The lineup remained largely the same from the Self-Destruct tour, featuring Finck (who rejoined the band), Charlie Clouser (who replaced James Woolley halfway through the Self-Destruct tour), and Lohner. To replace long-time member Vrenna, Reznor held open auditions to find a new drummer, eventually picking then-unknown Jerome Dillon.

Nine Inch Nails' record label at the time, Interscope Records, reportedly refused to fund the promotional tour following The Fragile's lukewarm sales. Reznor instead committed himself to fund the entire tour out of his own pocket, concluding that "The reality is, I’m broke at the end of the tour," but also adding, "I will never present a show that isn’t fantastic."

The Fragility tour began in late 1999, running until mid-2000, and was broken into two major legs, Fragility v1.0 and Fragility v2.0. Destinations included Europe, Japan, New Zealand, Australia, and North America. Before the first Fragility performance date in Spain, Nine Inch Nails opened their final rehearsal in London to 100 fans. Kick-starting the tour was a performance of the title track from The Fragile at the MTV Video Music Awards. Atari Teenage Riot opened for Nine Inch Nails during Fragility v1.0, and A Perfect Circle opened for Fragility v2.0. At the time, A Perfect Circle featured Josh Freese on drums, who would later replace Dillon and play drums for Nine Inch Nails from 2005 to 2008 and then from 2025 onwards. The tour featured increasingly large production values, including a triptych video display created by contemporary video artist Bill Viola. Rolling Stone magazine named Fragility the best tour of 2000.

In the years leading up to the Fragility Tour, Reznor's personal life had been complicated by addiction and grief. Following the commercial breakthrough of The Downward Spiral (1994), Reznor struggled privately with alcohol and drug use, which intensified after the death of his grandmother, the woman who had raised him. The loss profoundly destabilized him, and he began using substances heavily to cope. Cocaine and alcohol became central to his daily routine, with sessions often blurring into days of self-destructive excess. The recording of The Fragile took place during this period. Reznor later acknowledged that he was frequently incapable of writing lyrics or focusing on production because of withdrawal and intoxication. Although The Fragile was widely acclaimed upon release in 1999, Reznor himself could not appreciate its reception. In an interview cited by Exclaim!, he admitted that during this era "nothing felt good anymore, not music, not success, not anything". By the time the Fragility Tour began, Reznor was carrying the weight of his addictions into one of the most elaborate and demanding concert productions of his career. The most serious event occurred in June 2000, during the European leg of the tour in London. According to The Guardian, Reznor obtained what he thought was cocaine but which turned out to be heroin, specifically a highly potent form sometimes referred to as "China white", a type of fentanyl. After ingesting the drug, he collapsed and suffered a near-fatal overdose, requiring emergency medical care. The episode forced the cancellation of concerts and marked the lowest point of Reznor's life. The overdose left Reznor shaken. Though he continued to downplay the severity of his addiction immediately afterward, the London episode planted the realization that he was no longer in control. Several planned European performances were canceled, and Nine Inch Nails temporarily withdrew from touring. By 2001, Reznor entered rehabilitation, beginning the process of recovery. In interviews, he has repeatedly cited the 2000 overdose as the moment that forced him to confront the reality of his addictions. In a 2005 conversation he stated: "If I drink again I’ll probably die. And I don’t want to die."

In 2002, the tour documentary And All That Could Have Been was released featuring a collection of performances from the Fragility v2.0 tour. While making the DVD, Reznor commented on the tour in retrospect by saying "I thought the show was really, really good when we were doing it", but later admitted that he "can't watch [the DVD] at all. I was sick for most of that tour and I really don't think it was Nine Inch Nails at its best".

=== Live: With Teeth (2005–2006) ===
Following the release of With Teeth in 2005, the live band was reassembled for the Live: With Teeth tour. Since the previous tour five years earlier, much of the band had moved on in their careers, and only drummer Jerome Dillon rejoined. To find replacements, Reznor held auditions during December 2004. He stated that keyboardist Alessandro Cortini "fit in immediately", though he had trouble finding a guitarist to replace Robin Finck until auditioning Aaron North. Jerodie White joined the band on bass.

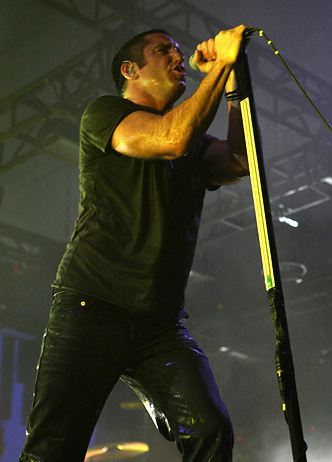
Reznor performing during the Live: With Teeth tour

The tour began with a series of small-club performances early in 2005 with the Dresden Dolls opening. The band told journalists they were "pleasantly surprised by the interest" of fans despite their lengthy absence. This initial leg of the tour also included a headlining performance at Coachella Valley Music and Arts Festival. The band followed with a North American arena tour in autumn 2005, supported by Queens of the Stone Age, Death From Above 1979, Autolux, and Saul Williams. Williams performed on stage with Nine Inch Nails at the Voodoo Music Experience festival during a headlining appearance in hurricane-stricken New Orleans, Reznor's former home. To conclude the With Teeth era of the band, Nine Inch Nails completed a tour of North American amphitheaters in the summer of 2006, joined by Bauhaus, TV on the Radio, and Peaches. The 2007 release Beside You in Time features performances from the North American arena tour, the North American amphitheater tour, and a number of studio rehearsals.

Nine Inch Nails were scheduled to perform at the 2005 MTV Movie Awards, but dropped themselves from the show due to a disagreement with the network over the use of an unaltered image of George W. Bush as a backdrop to the band's performance of "The Hand that Feeds". Soon afterwards, Reznor wrote on the official Nine Inch Nails website: "apparently, the image of our president is as offensive to MTV as it is to me". MTV replied by saying they respected Reznor's point of view, but were "uncomfortable" with the performance being "built around partisan political statements". A performance by the Foo Fighters replaced Nine Inch Nails' time slot on the show.

During the first arena performance in 2005, Dillon was forced to stop midway through the show and was subsequently hospitalized. His condition was later diagnosed as a non-life-threatening cardiac disorder, a consequence of his thyroid medication. Dillon later remarked that when he was ready to return he encountered "complete apathy and no sympathy" from Reznor and Nine Inch Nails' management. Reznor in turn wrote that Dillon's "recollection of the events leading to his departure from the band is once again inaccurate". Josh Freese initially replaced Dillon for two shows, then Alex Carapetis filled in on drums for most of the remaining leg of that tour.

=== Performance 2007 (2007) ===
Having taken a break from touring to complete work on Year Zero, Nine Inch Nails began a world tour in 2007, including their first ever performance in China. Reznor continued to tour with the same band he concluded the Live: With Teeth tour, which was composed of North, White, Freese, and Cortini.

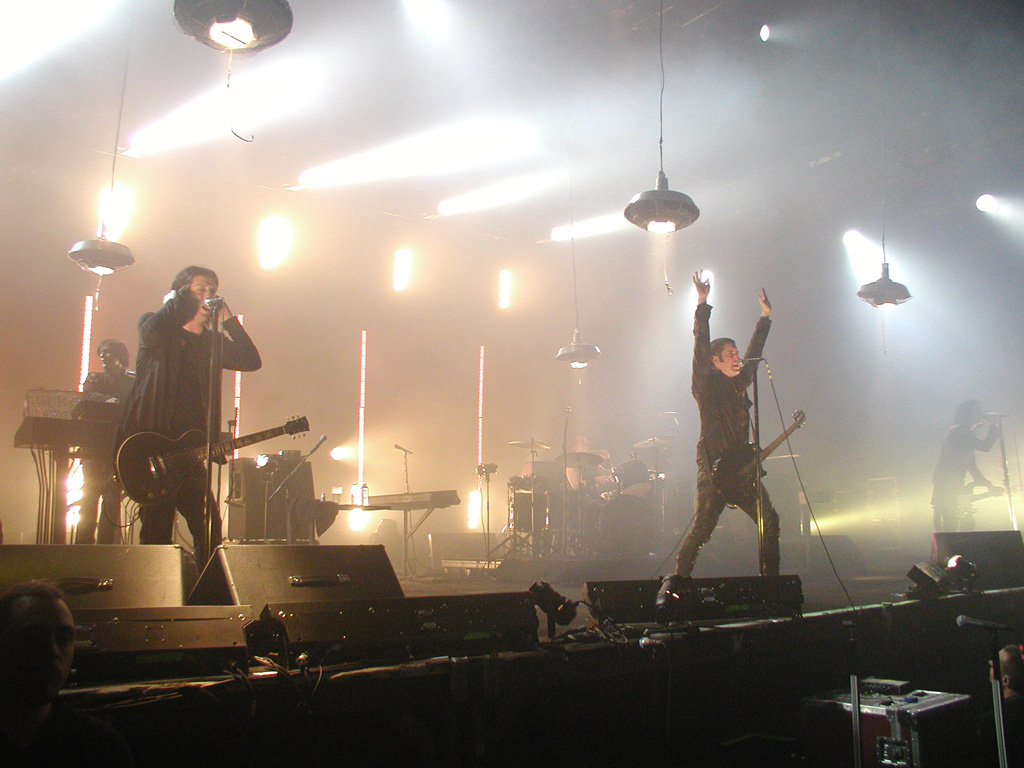
Nine Inch Nails during the Performance 2007 tour. From left to right: (Front) Jeordie White, Trent Reznor, Aaron North, (Back) Alessandro Cortini, Josh Freese

The Year Zero project included an alternate reality game of the same name, with much of the game revolving around various live shows. During a Nine Inch Nails concert in Lisbon, Portugal, a USB flash drive was found in a bathroom stall containing a high-quality MP3 of the track "My Violent Heart", a song from the then-unreleased album. A second USB drive was found after a concert in Barcelona, containing the track "Me, I'm Not". Following the release of Year Zero, the focus of the tour shifted towards debuting and promoting tracks from the new album. While some of these songs were performed by all 5 band members as conventional guitar-driven rock songs, two of them ("Me, I'm Not" and "The Great Destroyer") were played by Reznor, guitarist North and keyboard player Cortini as a 3-piece, using a combination of live guitars and pre-programmed samples triggered onstage with computers and manipulated in real time using Ableton software.

In April 2007, Nine Inch Nails fans received in-game telephone-calls in which they were invited to a "resistance meeting" in Los Angeles. At the meeting, fans attended a fictional Art Is Resistance meeting, and were later rewarded by an unannounced performance by Nine Inch Nails. The concert was cut short as the meeting was raided by a fictional SWAT team and the audience was rushed out of the building.

Later that year, the Honolulu Star-Bulletin reported that the September 18 show in Honolulu would be the last performance of the current incarnation of the Nine Inch Nails live band. Reznor told the newspaper "at this point, I want to switch things around a bit. Nine Inch Nails as a rock band configuration, we've done it and we've done it again. I see other ways I can present the material in concert, more challenging, something new. I don't want it to go stale". In the same article, Reznor also admitted that "the idea of five guys playing loud music [for] two hours ... has got to change once finances come into play, especially performing in markets outside of the mainland U.S. I want to whittle things down".

=== Lights in the Sky (2008) ===
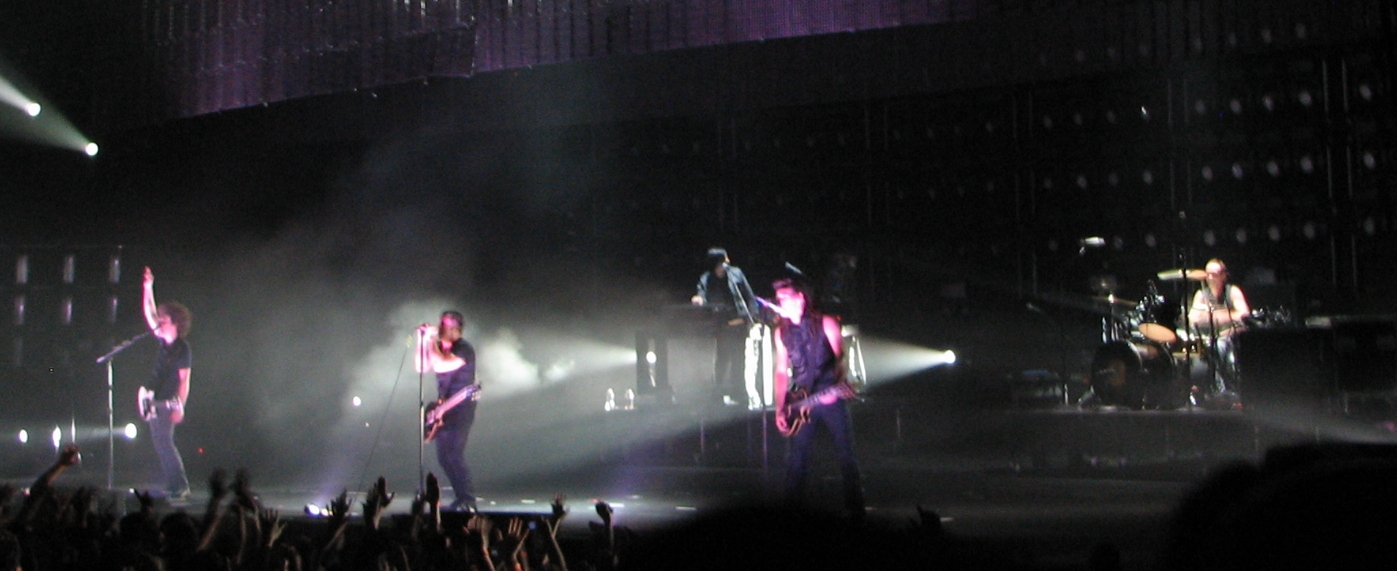
Left to right: Justin Meldal-Johnsen, Trent Reznor, Alessandro Cortini, Robin Finck, and Josh Freese touring for The Slip

The seventh and eighth major Nine Inch Nails studio-releases, Ghosts I–IV and The Slip, were released in March and May 2008, respectively. Both albums feature contributions from live-band member Alessandro Cortini. After the release of Ghosts I–IV, a 25-date tour was announced in several North American cities. Cortini and Freese returned as members from the previous tour, while Robin Finck rejoined the band on guitar. The lineup was initially to include Rich Fownes, but before any scheduled performances it was revealed that Justin Meldal-Johnsen would instead be contributing on bass guitar.

Supporting acts for the tour included Deerhunter, Crystal Castles, Does It Offend You, Yeah?, Ghostland Observatory, A Place to Bury Strangers, and White Williams. In early June, a tour EP was released for free on the Nine Inch Nails website featuring four songs from the supporting artists and one from Nine Inch Nails.

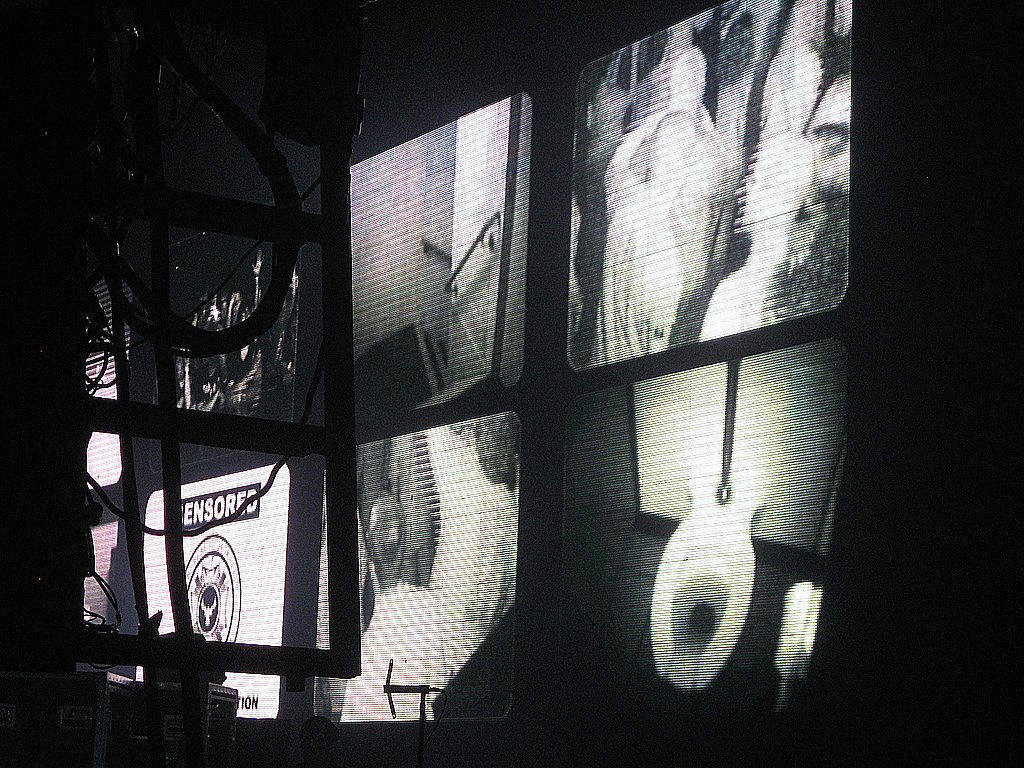
Stage setup for Survivalism during the 2008 Lights In The Sky Tour.

The band headlined the 2008 Lollapalooza festival, the 2008 Virgin Festival, and the first Pemberton Music Festival. In May 2008, Nine Inch Nails announced that premium seating for all the upcoming 2008 tour shows would be offered in a pre-sale for fans who registered at the official Nine Inch Nails website. In an effort to combat ticket scalpers, each concert ticket will list the purchaser's legal name. The ticketing process was previously used for smaller pre-sales and was available exclusively to fan club members. On July 26, Reznor introduced an "unplugged" portion into the live show in which the band steps to the front of the stage about an hour into the show, with Reznor on vibraphone and bassist Meldal-Johnsen playing an upright bass. The 20-minute jazzy, acoustic set is taken mostly from Ghosts I–IV. The stage show also featured mesh LED curtains that projected various visuals, ranging from falling rain to static to a ruined city, and made the band appear to be playing on "a stage that appeared to be constructed entirely out of lights."

On October 8, 2008, after finishing up their last show in South America, Reznor posted on the official Nine Inch Nails website blog that Josh Freese would be leaving the band following the completion of the current tour.

=== NIN|JA / Wave Goodbye (2009) ===
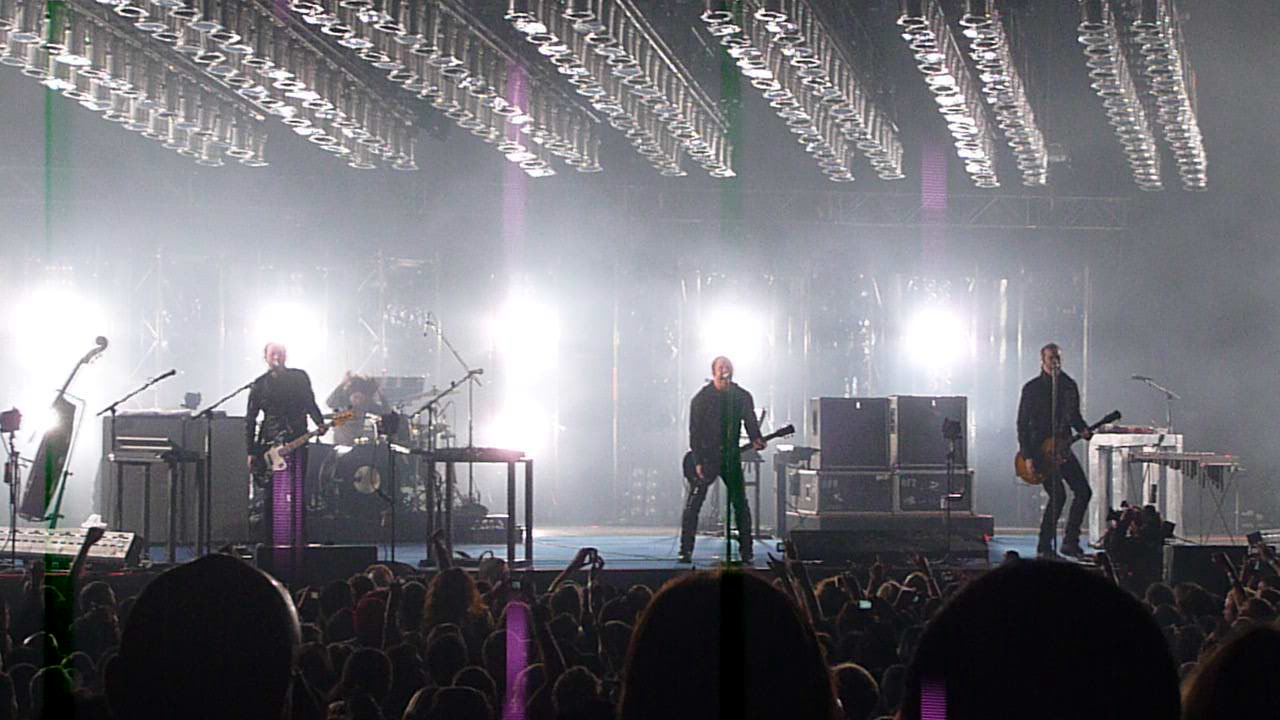
Left to right: Justin Meldal-Johnsen, Ilan Rubin, Trent Reznor and Robin Finck.

In 2008, Reznor decided to put Nine Inch Nails on indefinite hiatus. He later clarified that "NIN as a touring live band or live band that's on the road all the time [would be] stopping" after a comprehensive tour, but that he would continue to produce music thereafter.

In 2009, Ilan Rubin joined the band on drums, while Cortini's keyboardist position was not filled. The band embarked on a world farewell tour named Wave Goodbye. After an initial set of dates in New Zealand and Australia, they embarked on a summer amphitheater co-headlining tour of the U.S. with Jane's Addiction, dubbed the NIN|JA Tour. They then played a number of European and Asian festival and venues through the rest of the summer. In the fall, they played a short run of then-final U.S. shows at clubs and theaters.

=== Twenty Thirteen / Tension 2013 / NIN 2014 (2013–2014) ===
In February 2013, Trent Reznor announced that Nine Inch Nails would begin touring in support for Hesitation Marks, with festival performances in the summer, Tension 2013 arena performances in the fall, and worldwide performances throughout 2014. After Eric Avery and Adrian Belew dropped out during rehearsals, the festival tour lineup featured Alessandro Cortini, Josh Eustis, Robin Finck, Trent Reznor, and Ilan Rubin. For the Tension arena tour, Reznor added bassist Pino Palladino and backup vocalists Lisa Fischer and Sharlotte Gibson to the line-up.

After the Tension tour, Palladino, Fischer, Gibson, and Eustis departed, returning the band to a four-piece. They embarked on an international tour through Japan, Latin America, and Europe, including a co-headlining tour with Queens of the Stone Age in New Zealand and Australia. In the summer of 2014, they embarked on a summer amphitheater co-headlining tour with Soundgarden.

=== I Can't Seem to Wake Up (2017) ===
In March 2017, it was announced that the band would be supporting Not the Actual Events and Add Violence and perform at FYF Fest and Panorama Music Festival in July, with a few more shows added later in the year. The touring line-up featured the same line-up as the NIN 2014 tour which included Reznor, Finck, Cortini and Rubin, with the band's new official member, Atticus Ross, also joining the line-up. Nine Inch Nails begin the tour by performing at the Rabobank Arena in Bakersfield, California on July 19.

=== Cold and Black and Infinite (2018) ===
In 2018, NIN's Cold and Black and Infinite Tour of North America included two venues in Mexico City.

=== Cancelled tours (2020–2021) ===
Due to the global COVID-19 pandemic, the band was forced to cancel a planned tour that was to take place between September and October 2020. Trent Reznor announced via social media that he planned to still sell the merchandise that was to be sold during the tour, donating all profits to local food banks to the cities where the band was supposed to perform. The band later canceled a tour that was to take place in 2021 because of further concerns with the ongoing pandemic.

=== NIN 2022 (2022) ===
On February 7, 2022, Nine Inch Nails announced that the band would finally return to touring, with a limited run of tour dates in the U.S. in the spring and fall. More dates were later announced for the band touring in the United Kingdom in June. 100 gecs, Yves Tumor and Boy Harsher were announced as the opening acts for select shows, along with a show on September 24 in Cleveland, Ohio with Ministry and Nitzer Ebb.

=== Peel it Back (2025–2026) ===
Plans for a tour titled Peel It Back leaked on January 13, 2025. These leaks indicated August and September shows in the United States, Canada, and Europe. The leaks included a Facebook post for a September 10 event in Tampa, Florida, and an associated Ticketmaster listing. On the 14th, the band confirmed they were touring, with further details to follow, but their announcement was paused due to the ongoing Los Angeles wildfires. The band then confirmed the summer tour on January 22. On July 30, the band announced that Josh Freese would return on drums, replacing Ilan Rubin, who was recruited by Foo Fighters as their new drummer.

On October 1, 2025, a second North American leg of the Peel It Back tour was announced, scheduled for February and March 2026.

== Visual elements ==
Visual elements employed during Nine Inch Nails concerts have often included numerous lighting, stage and projection effects employed to accompany and augment presentation. Prior to the Fragility tour in 2000, Reznor reflected that "I’ve adopted a philosophy of the way to present Nine Inch Nails live that incorporates a theatrical element. I want it to be drama. I want my rock stars to be larger than life, you know? The Kurt Cobains of the world, I’m sick of that shit. I don’t want a gas station attendant being my hero. I grew up with Gene Simmons. I grew up with Ziggy Stardust."

Many songs are typically accompanied with specially designed visual aids, including synchronized lighting effects and projected stock-footage montages. Early performances of the song "Hurt", for example, were accompanied by a projected montage of clouds, charred bodies, mushroom clouds, maggots, and war refugees, a performance of which is featured in the song's music video. Recent performances of the song, however, have featured less lighting effects.

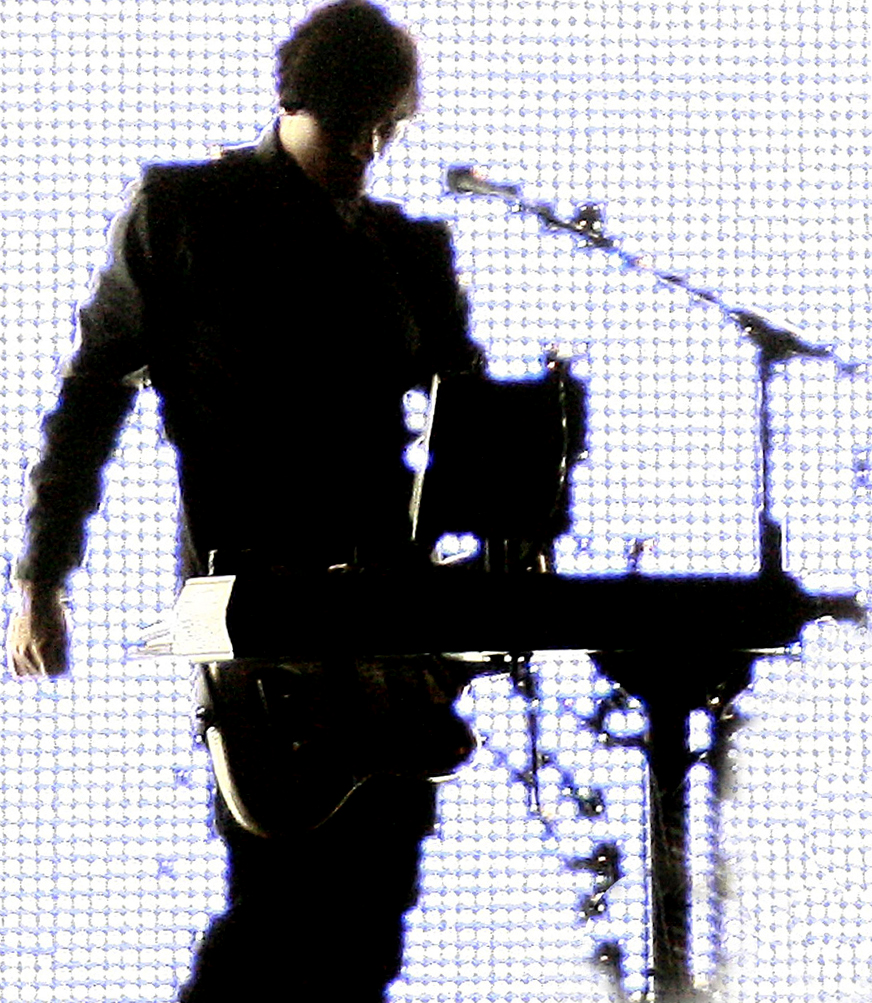
Alessandro Cortini, during a performance in 2007

Since 1999, the visual presentation of Nine Inch Nails live shows have been directed by Rob Sheridan, while Bill Viola designed a large triptych display for the Fragility tour. The images displayed on the triptych focused on storm and water imagery. And All That Could Have Been features an audio commentary track by Viola describing the display and his inspirations for it.

For the Live: With Teeth tour, Roy Bennett and Martin Phillips were responsible for the lighting design and stage design respectively.

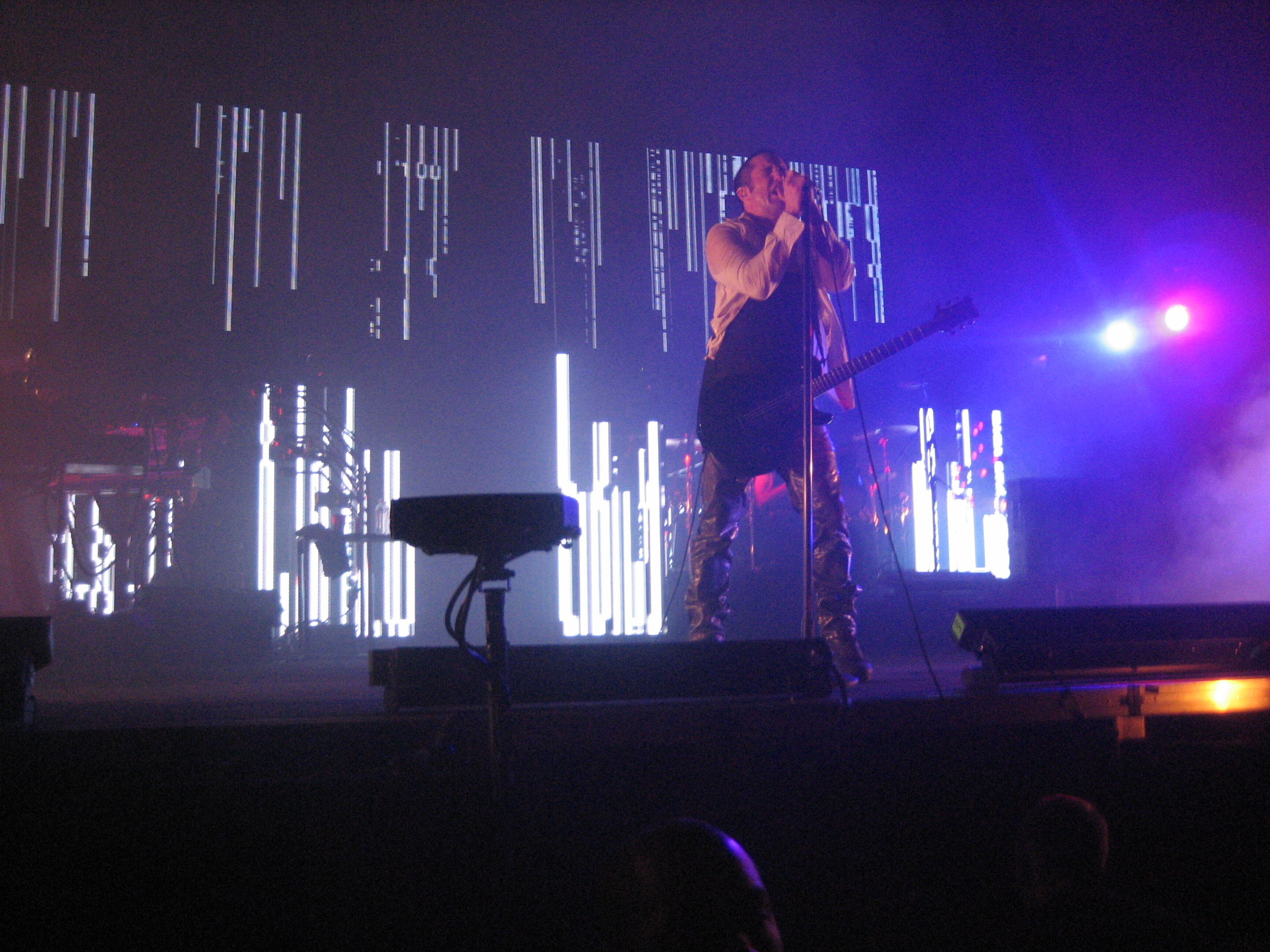
A Nine Inch Nails performance during the Live: With Teeth tour featuring the "teeth" lighting fixtures

Using the gauze projection-screen, Phillips, Reznor, and Sheridan devised a "gag" where they projected "a sheet of glass shattering onto a downstage kabuki scrim that would drop as the glass shatters fell. ... We settled on Trent swinging his guitar at the gauze [and] shattering it, but with all the pieces falling up as the [screen] flew out". This technique can be seen in the tour documentary Beside You in Time. In contrast to the lighting of previous tours, Performance 2007 featured minimal lighting that was designed to shadow Reznor and the band.

The visual elements of the live shows has been subject to much commentary. The Boston Globe described the Fragility tour as "one of the most outstanding light shows in memory". A reviewer from the Contra Costa Times described a Live: With Teeth performance as being "heightened by just the right amount of dark purple or blue spotlights, with up-lighting from the stage front, giving the band a horror-flick feel".

== Live releases ==
Nine Inch Nails has released one album and three videos featuring the live band. Closure, a double VHS set released in 1997, features live performances from the Self-Destruct Tour, including a performance of "Hurt" with David Bowie during the Dissonance Tour. The video has been out of print since its initial release, and all attempts to re-release the video on DVD have failed. A deluxe two-disc DVD version of Closure was delivered to Interscope Records in 2004 and indefinitely delayed from being released. However, both discs appeared on BitTorrent networks in December 2006, presumably leaked by Trent Reznor himself. And All That Could Have Been, which features performances from the Fragility 2.0 tour, was released in 2002 as a live CD and double DVD. An easter egg in the DVD version features a performance with Marilyn Manson at Madison Square Garden of the songs "Starfuckers, Inc." and Manson's "The Beautiful People".

== Live band members ==
The configuration of the band has evolved since first touring in 1988. Early incarnations of the band had three people playing guitars, drums, keyboards, and samplers. Later incarnations replaced the keyboards and samplers with an additional guitarist, and incarnations after that added a multi-instrumentalist whose main role was as a bassist but also played guitars and keyboards on a number of songs. Finally, the live component of Nine Inch Nails has settled as a five-piece band since the Self Destruct tour from 1994. On the Performance 2007 tour, some songs from the Year Zero album were performed as a 3-piece band, featuring Reznor, keyboard player Alessandro Cortini and guitarist Aaron North, using a combination of live guitars and triggered loops. In September 2007, Reznor expressed his interest in moving away from the "rock band configuration" to explore "other ways [to] present the material in concert".

Describing the selection process, early contributor Chris Vrenna told Gannett News "coming from the same emotional background, I feel, is more important than how well you can play your instrument. That's one reason that makes our shows more intense when we're up there ... We found people that understood that. It makes us stronger". Reznor described his selection of the earliest incarnations of the live band by saying "I'm not in the position to offer somebody a thousand dollars a week to rehearse ... So I took some young guys who were malleable, who would basically do what I want them to do but expand on it. The only context I've worked with them in so far is, 'Here are the songs, here are your parts, learn them.' "

Personnel

- Trent Reznor^{#} – lead vocals, guitars, bass, keyboards, synthesizers, tambourine, xylophone, vibraphone, saxophone (1988–present)
- Chris Vrenna^{#} – keyboards, samplers, drums (1988–1990, 1992–1996)
- Ron Musarra – drums, samplers (1988)
- Richard Patrick^{#} – guitars (1989–1993)
- Gary Talpas – keyboards (1989)
- Nick Rushe – keyboards (1989)
- David Haymes – keyboards (1990)
- Lee Mars – keyboards (1990–1991)
- James Woolley – synthesizers (1991–1994)
- Jeff Ward – drums (1990–1991)
- Robin Finck^{#} – guitars, synthesizers (1994–1996, 1999–2000, 2008–present)
- Danny Lohner^{#} – bass, guitars, synthesizers (1993–2003)
- Charlie Clouser^{#} – keyboards, synthesizers, theremin, drums (1994–2001)
- Kevin McMahon – guitars (1996)
- Jerome Dillon^{#} – drums (1999–2005)
- Jeordie White – bass, guitars, synthesizers (2005–2007)
- Aaron North – guitars (2005–2007)
- Alessandro Cortini^{#} – keyboards, synthesizers, guitars, bass (2005–2008, 2013–2025)
- Josh Freese^{#} – drums, marimba (2005–2008, 2025-present)
- Alex Carapetis – drums (2005)
- Justin Meldal-Johnsen – bass (2008–2009)
- Ilan Rubin^{#} – drums, keyboards, cello, guitar (2009–2025)
- Josh Eustis^{#} – bass, guitars, keyboards, marimba, percussion, saxophone (2013)
- Pino Palladino^{#} – bass (2013)
- Lisa Fischer – vocals (2013)
- Sharlotte Gibson^{#} – vocals (2013)
- Atticus Ross^{#} – keyboards, synthesizers (2016–present)
- Stu Brooks – bass (2026–present)

Live guests

- Mike Garson^{#} – piano (September 2009 at the Henry Fonda Theater for the song "Just Like You Imagined")

"#" – indicates live-band members who have contributed to major Nine Inch Nails studio releases.

== Guest artists and collaborations ==
Through the years, Reznor has invited many prominent musicians on stage with his band to perform material outside the usual range of Nine Inch Nails songs:

- During Lollapalooza '91 Jane's Addiction members Dave Navarro and Eric Avery played guitars alongside Gibby Haynes and Ice-T for the last song of the band's set, "Head Like a Hole".
- In early 1995, Adam Ant and Marco Pirroni joined Nine Inch Nails on stage to perform "Physical" and other Adam and the Ants songs.
- During the Dissonance tour, Nine Inch Nails co-headlined with David Bowie, whose own contemporary tour was called the Outside Tour. Throughout the tour, Nine Inch Nails would perform first and segue into Bowie's band. The two bands would play a mixture of Nine Inch Nails and David Bowie songs. Nine Inch Nails would eventually leave the stage and Bowie and his band would continue with their own set.
- Marilyn Manson appeared on stage during a concert at Madison Square Garden in 2000 to sing "Starfuckers, Inc." and "The Beautiful People". This performance is featured as an easter egg in the And All That Could Have Been DVD.
- During the Live: With Teeth amphitheater tour, Nine Inch Nails and Peter Murphy of Bauhaus performed the Pere Ubu song "Final Solution", which was also a solo hit for Murphy. For the last show, they collaborated to cover Joy Division's "Dead Souls", which Nine Inch Nails has regularly played since 1994. Also during this tour, Reznor, Murphy, and other musicians performed four unique sets of their favorite songs on radio stations around the country.
