= Year Zero Remixed =

Remix album by Nine Inch Nails
- Released: November 20, 2007
- Recorded: 2007
- Genres: Industrial rock; electronica; industrial hip hop; post-industrial; electronic rock
- Length: 71:16
- Label: Interscope

Nine Inch Nails chronology
Year Zero (2007)	Year Zero Remixed (2007)	Ghosts I–IV (2008)

Halo numbers chronology
Halo 24 (2007)	Halo 25 (2007)	Halo 26 (2008)

Year Zero Remixed (stylized as Y34RZ3R0R3M1X3D) is the third remix album by the American industrial rock band Nine Inch Nails, released in the United States on November 20, 2007, and in the United Kingdom six days later. It features remixed versions of tracks from the band's previous studio album Year Zero, created by various producers and recording artists.

This album was the last Nine Inch Nails album to be released by Interscope Records; it fulfilled the band's contractual commitments to the company, leaving Nine Inch Nails frontman Trent Reznor to proceed as a "totally free agent, free of any recording contract with any label".

== Versions ==
The album was released in three formats: digital download, CD/DVD-ROM combo, and triple vinyl. The digital download and CD releases feature the same track listing. The iTunes version lists the album title as Y34RZ3R0R3MIX3D, using the letter "I" in place of the numeral "1" when compared to the album's cover art. The bonus DVD-ROM included with the CD release contains multi-track files from the entire Year Zero album in GarageBand and Ableton Live formats, as well as a demo version of the Ableton Live software, and 44100 Hz WAV-format files of the album's individual track portions, for use in any non-linear music editing software such as Cakewalk Sonar or Pro Tools.

Five songs are exclusive to the vinyl pressing, including the Switch remix of "Capital G", which was previously released on the "Capital G" single; and two different mixes of "Vessel". The LP was pressed on triple 180 Gram virgin vinyl at Nashville's historic United Record Pressing and features a triple gatefold jacket. The Saul Williams remix of "Survivalism" (previously featured on some editions of the "Survivalism" single) and the shortest of Bill Laswell's three remixes of "Vessel" are not included on the vinyl. The Ladytron remix of "The Beginning of the End" on the album incorporates the outro motif from the 1994 Nine Inch Nails song "Closer".

== Critical reception ==
Professional ratings
Review scores
Source	Rating
The A.V. Club	B−
Kerrang!	3/5 stars
NME	7/10
Pitchfork	5.8/10
The Second Supper	4/5 stars
Virgin Media	4/5 stars

Year Zero Remixed received generally positive reviews. Virgin Media's review described the album as "a real cornucopia of treats" and "[h]ighly recommended". Pitchfork's review, however, criticized the album, writing that it "lacks cohesion and is predictably spotty". The Toronto Star stated, "Year Zero Remixed enlists a commendably eclectic assortment of artists. The results are an intriguingly cerebral hodgepodge." It also stated that the largest selling point was the bonus DVD-ROM disc. The Denver Post mused that "perhaps it's the best remix outing of Reznor's career".

== Track listing ==
=== CD/DVD and digital download ===
No.	Title	Remixer(s)	Length
1.	"Gunshots by Computer"	Saul Williams	1:43
2.	"The Great Destroyer"	Modwheelmood	4:19
3.	"My Violent Heart"	Pirate Robot Midget	2:34
4.	"The Beginning of the End"	Ladytron	4:20
5.	"Survivalism" (Survivalism_Tardusted)	Saul Williams	4:19
6.	"Capital G" (Capital G: Phones 666 Revolutions)	Phones	7:26
7.	"Vessel"	Bill Laswell	6:10
8.	"The Warning" (The Warning: Real World Remix)	Stefan Goodchild feat. Doudou N'Diaye Rose	3:43
9.	"Meet Your Master"	The Faint	3:35
10.	"God Given"	Stephen Morris and Gillian Gilbert	4:27
11.	"Me, I'm Not"	Olof Dreijer	14:00
12.	"Another Version of the Truth"	Kronos Quartet and Enrique Gonzalez Müller	4:25
13.	"In This Twilight"	Fennesz	4:37
14.	"Zero-Sum"	Stephen Morris and Gillian Gilbert	5:38
Total length:			71:16

=== Vinyl ===
(Note: One of the discs is single-sided.)

Side A
No.	Title	Remixer(s)	Length
1.	"Gunshots by Computer" a.k.a. "Hyperpower! (Gunshots by Computer)"	Saul Williams	1:43
2.	"The Great Destroyer"	Modwheelmood	4:39
3.	"My Violent Heart"	Pirate Robot Midget	2:34
4.	"The Beginning of the End"	Ladytron	4:21
5.	"Capital G" a.k.a. "Capital G: Epworth Phones 666 Revolutions"	Epworth Phones	7:26

Side B
No.	Title	Remixer(s)	Length
1.	"The Warning" a.k.a. "The Warning: Real World Remix"	Stefan Goodchild feat. Doudou N'Diaye Rose	3:44
2.	"Meet Your Master"	The Faint	3:35
3.	"God Given"	Stephen Morris and Gillian Gilbert	4:28
4.	"Vessel [Mix 1]"	Bill Laswell	9:23

Side C
No.	Title	Remixer(s)	Length
1.	"Capital G"	Switch	5:00
2.	"Me, I'm Not"	Olof Dreijer	14:01

Side D
No.	Title	Remixer(s)	Length
1.	"The Good Soldier" a.k.a. "The Good Soldier: (Friend or Faux 001)"	Sam Fog of Interpol	8:05
2.	"Vessel [Mix 2]"	Bill Laswell	12:58

Side E
No.	Title	Remixer(s)	Length
1.	"Capital G"	Ladytron	5:04
2.	"Another Version of the Truth"	Kronos Quartet and Enrique Gonzalez Müller	4:25
3.	"In This Twilight"	Fennesz	4:37
4.	"Zero-Sum"	Stephen Morris and Gillian Gilbert	5:39
Total length:			101:16

== Charts ==
=== Weekly charts ===
Weekly chart performance for Year Zero Remixed
Chart (2007)	Peak position
Australian Albums (ARIA)	87
Canadian Albums (Billboard)	28
French Albums (SNEP)	183
UK Albums Chart	160
UK Rock & Metal Albums (Official Charts)	10
US Billboard 200	77
US Top Alternative Albums (Billboard)	13
US Top Dance Albums (Billboard)	1
US Top Rock Albums (Billboard)	19

=== Year-end charts ===
Year-end chart performance for Year Zero Remixed
Chart (2008)	Position
US Top Dance/Electronic Albums (Billboard)	15
