= Ghosts I–IV =

Studio album by Nine Inch Nails
- Released: March 2, 2008
- Recorded: October–December 2007
- Genre: Dark ambient
- Length: 109:56
- Label: The Null Corporation
- Producers: Alan Moulder; Trent Reznor; Atticus Ross

Nine Inch Nails chronology
Year Zero Remixed (2007)	Ghosts I–IV (2008)	The Slip (2008)

Halo numbers chronology
Halo 25 (2007)	Halo 26 (2008)	Halo 27 (2008)

Ghosts I–IV is the sixth studio album by the American industrial rock band Nine Inch Nails, released by The Null Corporation on March 2, 2008. It was the band's first independent release following their split from longtime label Interscope Records in 2007. The production team included Nine Inch Nails frontman Trent Reznor, studio collaborators Atticus Ross and Alan Moulder, and contributions from Alessandro Cortini, Adrian Belew, and Brian Viglione.

Reznor described Ghosts as "a soundtrack for daydreams," a sentiment echoed by critics, who compared it to the work of Brian Eno and Robert Fripp. The tracks are unnamed, identified only by their track listing and group number, and are almost entirely instrumental. Although conceived as a five-track EP, the final release consisted of four nine-track EPs, totaling 36 tracks. The album was released under a Creative Commons license (BY-NC-SA) and in a variety of differing packages and prices, including a $300 deluxe edition, without prior announcement. A YouTube-based film festival was also announced, inviting fans to visually interpret the music and post their submissions, but no mention has been made of the festival since its announcement.

Ghosts I–IV received positive reviews; critics praised its experimentalism and unorthodox release. It reached number 14 in the US, and was nominated for Grammy Awards for Best Rock Instrumental Performance and Best Boxed or Special Limited Edition Package, the first time music released under a Creative Commons license had been nominated for a Grammy Award. In March 2020, Nine Inch Nails released two follow-up albums to Ghosts I–IV: Ghosts V: Together and Ghosts VI: Locusts.

== Production ==
=== Recording and music ===
Nine Inch Nails frontman Trent Reznor announced in 2007 that the band had completed its contractual obligations to its record label, Interscope Records, and would no longer be working with the company. He also revealed that the band would likely distribute its next album independently, possibly in a fashion similar to Saul Williams' 2007 album The Inevitable Rise and Liberation of NiggyTardust!, which Reznor produced.

Following the Performance 2007 Tour in support of the band's previous album Year Zero (2007), Reznor set out to make a record "with very little forethought". Ghosts I–IV originated from an experiment: "The rules were as follows: 10 weeks, no clear agenda, no overthinking, everything driven by impulse. Whatever happens during that time gets released as... something." Reznor explained, "I've been considering and wanting to make this kind of record for years, but by its very nature it wouldn't have made sense until this point".

The core creative team behind the project was Reznor, Atticus Ross, and Alan Moulder. Live-band member Alessandro Cortini and studio musicians Adrian Belew and Brian Viglione also contributed instrumental performances on select tracks. Reznor described the band's early intentions for the project as "an experiment", and explained the group's process: "When we started working with the music, we would generally start with a sort of visual reference that we had imagined: a place, or a setting, or a situation. And then attempt to describe that with sound and texture and melody. And treat it, in a sense, as if it were a soundtrack."

The musicians created the album tracks through improvisation and experimentation. As a result, the initial plan to release a single EP of the material expanded to include the increasing amount of material. Viglione contributed percussion to tracks 19 and 22. He stated that Reznor's instructions to him were to "build a drumkit. Piece together any stuff that you want to bang on; rent what you want to rent. Have fun and... be creative—See where your mind and your ideas take you." Viglione's makeshift drum kit included a 50-gallon trash can, a pair of water cooler jugs, and a cookie tray with a chain across it. Alessandro Cortini is credited on a total of ten tracks from Ghosts for his contributions on guitar, bass guitar, dulcimer, and electronics. Cortini was brought onto the project two weeks into the process, and his involvement evolved from "first recording some extra parts to some tracks" and eventually into "a collaboration on [the] tracks noted in the booklet". Adrian Belew was also brought on for select instrumental contributions, but as the project evolved Reznor expanded Belew's involvement and shared writing credit with him on two tracks.

Ghosts I–IV is an almost entirely instrumental album, with only a few tracks containing sampled vocals. Reznor described the album's sound as "the result of working from a very visual perspective—dressing imagined locations and scenarios with sound and texture; a soundtrack for daydreams." PopMatters' review of the album compared its musical style to that of Brian Eno and Robert Fripp, ultimately categorizing it as "dark ambient". The review went on to describe the music as "a tonal painting, a collection of moods and not all of these moods are good ones." NPR compared the album to the music of Erik Satie and Brian Eno. Rolling Stone also compared the album to the work of Brian Eno, specifically the album's sound to the instrumentals of Another Green World (1975) and the rhythm collages of My Life in the Bush of Ghosts (1981). Robert Christgau also compared the album to the work of Brian Eno, summarizing Ghosts' sound as "mental wallpaper".

Ghosts I–IV features a wide assortment of musical instruments, including piano, guitar, bass, synthesizer, marimba, tambourine, banjo, dulcimer, and xylophone, many of which were sampled and distorted electronically. Percussion instruments, contributed primarily by Brian Viglione, were constructed largely out of found objects and household items.

=== Artwork ===
Rob Sheridan acted as the album's art director, in collaboration with Artist in Residence. Sheridan was also art director for the previous two Nine Inch Nails studio albums, With Teeth (2005) and Year Zero. Since Ghosts was released in a variety of versions, some of the versions feature somewhat differing (or additional) album art and related artwork. A 40-page PDF comes with each version of the album and contains a photograph for each of the 36 tracks. These photographs are also embedded into the ID3 tags of every downloadable track.

== Release ==
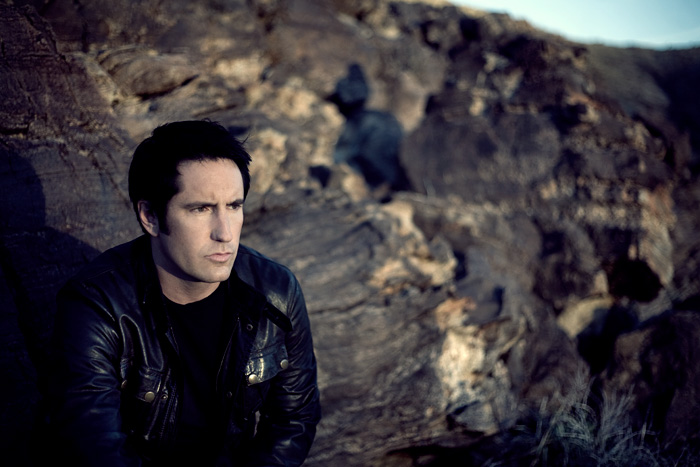
Promotional photo of Reznor for Ghosts I–IV

Ghosts I–IV was released online on March 2, 2008, on the official Nine Inch Nails website in a number of different formats at various price points. The only prior advertisement or notice of the release was a post by Reznor two weeks prior on the site saying "2 weeks!" Ghosts was the first album released by Reznor's independent label The Null Corporation. Retail copies of the album were distributed by RED Distribution on April 8 on CD and vinyl formats, and May 1 for the "Deluxe" and "Ultra-Deluxe" editions. The smallest Ghosts package contains the first nine tracks, available for free online from either the official Nine Inch Nails website or officially from various BitTorrent trackers, including The Pirate Bay. The entire album was also made available for download directly from the band for US$5. Physical copies of the album were available for pre-sale online, with immediate access to the digital version. A two-disc version includes two audio CDs and a 16-page booklet for $10. A "Deluxe Edition" is available for $75 and includes two audio CDs, a data-DVD containing multitrack files of the album, a Blu-ray Disc with the album in high-definition stereo and accompanying slide show, and a 48-page hardcover book with photographs. A $300 "Ultra-Deluxe Limited Edition" included everything in the "Deluxe" edition, as well as a 4-LP 180 gram vinyl set in a fabric slipcase, and two exclusive limited edition Giclée prints, unique to each copy. These were limited to 2,500 pieces, each copy numbered and signed by Trent Reznor. Reznor described the limited edition release as "the most luxurious physical package we've ever created." Finally, the album was also released on 4-LP 130 gram vinyl, set in a double gate fold package, for $39.

The album is licensed under a Creative Commons Attribution Non-Commercial Share Alike license, in effect allowing anyone to use or rework the material for any non-profit purpose, as long as credit is provided and the resulting work is released under a similar license. Reznor explained this move by saying "It's a stance we're taking that we feel is appropriate [...] with digital technology, and outdated copyright laws, and all the nonsense that's going on these days". Jim Guerinot, then manager of Nine Inch Nails, explained the unconventional release of the album as "[not] a reaction to what doesn’t exist today. [...] it’s more just like, 'Hey, in a vacuum I can do whatever I want to do.'" The digital-release of the album reportedly required an extensive overhaul of the Nine Inch Nails website in order for the site to cope with the influx of traffic, online-payments, and customer service needs of releasing the album. These upgrades cost Reznor approximately $20,000 to implement. Despite these measures, upon the release of Ghosts the site crashed, and additional servers were necessary to handle the traffic.

=== Film festival ===
Nearly two weeks after the release of the album, Reznor organized and announced a user-created "film festival" as an accompaniment to the album, hosted at the official Nine Inch Nails YouTube channel. It was revealed that the album was stripped of much artwork and song titles to provide a blank canvas for the project. Reznor explained that the endeavor was not meant as a contest, but as "an experiment in collaboration and a chance for us to interact beyond the typical one-way artist-to-fan relationship." Over 2,000 video submissions were posted and over 13,000 members joined the festival group, which started in March 2008.

=== Live performances ===
Ghosts I–IV material was implemented into Nine Inch Nails live performances typically as a distinct section of instrumental songs midway through the show. Ghosts material was performed in this manner primarily as part of the Lights in the Sky tour in 2008, immediately after the album's release. During these segments the music was largely acoustic, as opposed to the electric instrumentation of other Nine Inch Nails live sets. The Ghosts segment included instrumentation from a marimba, harmonium, glockenspiel, double bass, banjo and various homemade percussion instruments. The Ghosts section was later scrapped for the "NINJA" and "Wave Goodbye" tours, as Reznor felt the instrumental songs did not fit with the set lists.

== Critical reception ==
Professional ratings
Aggregate scores
Source	Rating
Metacritic	69/100
Review scores
Source	Rating
AllMusic	2/5 stars
Blender	2.5/5 stars
IGN	8.7/10
MSN Music (Consumer Guide)	A−
Now	3/5
Pitchfork	5.0/10
PopMatters	8/10
Rolling Stone	3.5/5 stars
Spin	4/5 stars
Uncut	4/5 stars

According to the review aggregator Metacritic, Ghosts I–IV received "generally favorable reviews" based on a weighted average score of 69 out of 100 from 12 critic scores. Seth Colter Walls of Newsweek described the album as "the kind of absorbing musical experience that the surviving ranks of know-it-all record-store clerks would be pushing on customers, if only they could offer it for sale." IGN gave the album a rating of 8.7 out of 10 and wrote, "The music is so engrossing and encompassing that time ceases to be a factor—at least until the music finally stops." PopMatters gave the album an 8 out of 10, and described the album as "36 tracks, but no songs", and went on to call it "dark, brooding [...] haunting." Pitchfork criticized the album by saying "nearly every one of the untitled instrumental sketches here feels emaciated and half-finished", and gave the work a 5.0 out of 10.0. Blender also criticized the album, summarizing the review by saying "Nine Inch Nails return with no label oversight, no boundaries and no tunes." The Washington Post stated, "There's too much here. Yet it's the most interesting NIN in years." The review went on to describe each track as "the sonic equivalent of a silver orb hovering in your living room [which then] explodes into a million shiny balls of mercury that splash to the floor before trickling, magnetically, back into a large round mass."

The album's unorthodox distribution methods also garnered the attention of various news agencies, such as Wired's Eliot Van Buskirk, who labeled Ghosts as "a remarkably extensive release." Ben Worthen of The Wall Street Journal hypothesized that "most business execs [...] could learn a lot from [Reznor's] experiments with online business models." Many news agencies compared the release to Radiohead's 2007 "pay what you want" digital release of In Rainbows, as well as the similar release of Saul Williams' album The Inevitable Rise and Liberation of NiggyTardust! the same year, which Reznor produced. Rolling Stone's review called the album a "a new-media showpiece", while Tiny Mix Tapes said "the circumstances surrounding the release are so forward-thinking that they could be considered just as key to appreciating the album as the music itself." Financial website The Motley Fool wrote an article on the album's release titled "Music Industry Gets Nailed Again," forecasting that "Innovators like Nine Inch Nails are paving the way for new media business models that may bypass the middleman while making sure artists and fans are happy." In its review of The Slip, however, PopMatters described Ghosts I–IV in retrospect as an "aimless batch of... instrumentals packaged in a brilliant marketing scheme" and said that it was "basically a CD release with a couple of mail-order special editions available for the 'true fans'."

=== Accolades ===
Ghosts was nominated for two Grammy Awards, under the categories Best Rock Instrumental Performance for the track "34 Ghosts IV", and Best Boxed Set or Limited Edition Package for the "Ultra-Deluxe" edition of the album. These nominations represented the first time music licensed under Creative Commons had been nominated for a Grammy Award. Following the release of Ghosts and the similar online release method of the band's follow-up, The Slip, Reznor was awarded the Webby Artist of the Year Award at the annual Webby Awards in 2009. Rolling Stone magazine named Reznor number 46 in its "100 People Who Are Changing America" list, concluding that he has "been more creative than anyone in embracing the post-CD era".

== Commercial performance ==
The album's initial release on the official Nine Inch Nails website suffered problems as the website was inundated with traffic, and was not fully operational until extra servers were added to handle the influx of downloads. A week after the album's release, the official Nine Inch Nails site reported over 780,000 purchase and download transactions, amassing over $1.6 million in sales. Pre-orders of the $300 "Ultra-Deluxe Limited Edition" sold out in less than 30 hours of its release.

The physical release of the album debuted at number 14 on the US Billboard 200 with 26,000 copies sold in its first week. The album also topped Billboard's Dance/Electronic Albums chart. It had sold 149,000 copies in the United States by May 2013. Internationally, Ghosts peaked at number three in Canada, number 15 in Australia, number 26 in New Zealand, number 58 in Austria, and number 60 in the United Kingdom.

== Influence ==
"02 Ghosts I" has been featured in the 2012 documentary film Kony 2012. Portions of the album were used as the soundtrack to the 2014 documentary film Citizenfour. The 2018 documentary series The Fourth Estate features variations of songs from Ghosts I-IV, in addition to the series' opening sequence being scored by Reznor and Ross.

"34 Ghosts IV" was sampled by music producer YoungKio for a beat subsequently used on the 2018 Lil Nas X song "Old Town Road"—a track that both Reznor and Ross received credit for. It reached number one on the Billboard Hot 100 in April 2019, and stayed there for a record-breaking nineteen consecutive weeks. The song also earned both Reznor and Ross a Country Music Association Awards nomination for Musical Event of the Year.

== Follow-up albums ==
Reznor wrote in 2008 that "more volumes of Ghosts are likely to appear in the future." In a 2009 interview with Trent Vanegas, he repeated his intention to make another Ghosts album in the near future.

On March 26, 2020, as a response to the COVID-19 pandemic, the band released the previously unannounced Ghosts V: Together and Ghosts VI: Locusts, for free download on the band's website, YouTube channel, and streaming platforms.

== Track listing ==
All tracks are written by Trent Reznor and Atticus Ross, except where noted.

Ghosts I (disc one)
No.	Title	Writer(s)	Length
1.	"1 Ghosts I"		2:48
2.	"2 Ghosts I"		3:16
3.	"3 Ghosts I"		3:51
4.	"4 Ghosts I"	Reznor; Ross; Alessandro Cortini	2:13
5.	"5 Ghosts I"		2:51
6.	"6 Ghosts I"		4:18
7.	"7 Ghosts I"		2:00
8.	"8 Ghosts I"		2:56
9.	"9 Ghosts I"		2:47

Ghosts II
No.	Title	Writer(s)	Length
10.	"10 Ghosts II"		2:42
11.	"11 Ghosts II"	Reznor; Ross; Cortini	2:17
12.	"12 Ghosts II"		2:17
13.	"13 Ghosts II"		3:13
14.	"14 Ghosts II"		3:05
15.	"15 Ghosts II"		1:53
16.	"16 Ghosts II"		2:30
17.	"17 Ghosts II"	Reznor; Ross; Cortini	2:13
18.	"18 Ghosts II"		5:22

Ghosts III (disc two)
No.	Title	Writer(s)	Length
19.	"19 Ghosts III"	Reznor; Ross; Cortini; Brian Viglione	2:11
20.	"20 Ghosts III"		3:39
21.	"21 Ghosts III"		2:54
22.	"22 Ghosts III"	Reznor; Ross; Cortini; Viglione	2:31
23.	"23 Ghosts III"		2:43
24.	"24 Ghosts III"		2:39
25.	"25 Ghosts III"	Reznor; Ross; Adrian Belew	1:58
26.	"26 Ghosts III"		2:25
27.	"27 Ghosts III"	Reznor; Ross; Belew	2:51

Ghosts IV
No.	Title	Writer(s)	Length
28.	"28 Ghosts IV"		5:22
29.	"29 Ghosts IV"	Reznor; Ross; Cortini	2:54
30.	"30 Ghosts IV"		2:58
31.	"31 Ghosts IV"		2:25
32.	"32 Ghosts IV"		4:25
33.	"33 Ghosts IV"	Reznor; Ross; Cortini	4:01
34.	"34 Ghosts IV"		5:52
35.	"35 Ghosts IV"		3:29
36.	"36 Ghosts IV"		2:19
Total length:			109:56

Bonus tracks
No.	Title	Length
37.	"37 Ghosts"	2:20
38.	"38 Ghosts"	4:51
Total length:		117:07

=== Notes ===
- Tracks 37 and 38 are accessible only by reconstructing them from multi-track files provided on the DVD. The second bonus track features musical elements and a similar song structure to "Demon Seed," track 10 from what would be the next Nine Inch Nails release The Slip.

== Personnel ==
Album credits adapted from the liner notes of Ghosts I–IV:

- Trent Reznor – performance, production, art direction
- Atticus Ross – programming, arranging, production
- Adrian Belew – guitars (3, 4, 7, 10–11, 14, 16, 21, 25, 27, 31, 32, 35), electronics (25), marimba (30)
- Alessandro Cortini – bass (4), guitars (4, 11, 17, 20, 24, 28), dulcimer (22), additional electronics (19, 22, 29, 33)
- Josh Freese – drums (38)
- Brian Viglione – drums (19, 22)
- Alan Moulder – engineering, mix engineering, production
- Tom Baker – mastering
- Rob Sheridan – art direction, photography, visual and physical elements
- Artist in Residence – art direction, photography, visual and physical elements
- Phillip Graybill – photography
- Tamar Levine – additional photography

== Charts ==
=== Weekly charts ===
Chart (2008)	Peak position
Australian Albums (ARIA)	15
Austrian Albums (Ö3 Austria)	58
Belgian Albums (Ultratop Flanders)	54
Belgian Albums (Ultratop Wallonia)	90
Canadian Albums (Billboard)	3
German Albums (Offizielle Top 100)	60
Irish Albums (IRMA)	83
Italian Albums (FIMI)	80
Japanese Albums (Oricon)	89
New Zealand Albums (RMNZ)	26
Scottish Albums (Official Charts)	50
UK Albums (Official Charts)	60
UK Independent Albums (Official Charts)	6
UK Rock & Metal Albums (Official Charts)	4
US Billboard 200	14
US Independent Albums (Billboard)	2
US Top Alternative Albums (Billboard)	3
US Top Dance Albums (Billboard)	1
US Top Rock Albums (Billboard)	3

=== Year-end charts ===
Chart (2008)	Position
US Top Dance/Electronic Albums (Billboard)	9
