= Performance 2007 Tour =

2007 concert tour by Nine Inch Nails

Performance 2007
- Tour by Nine Inch Nails
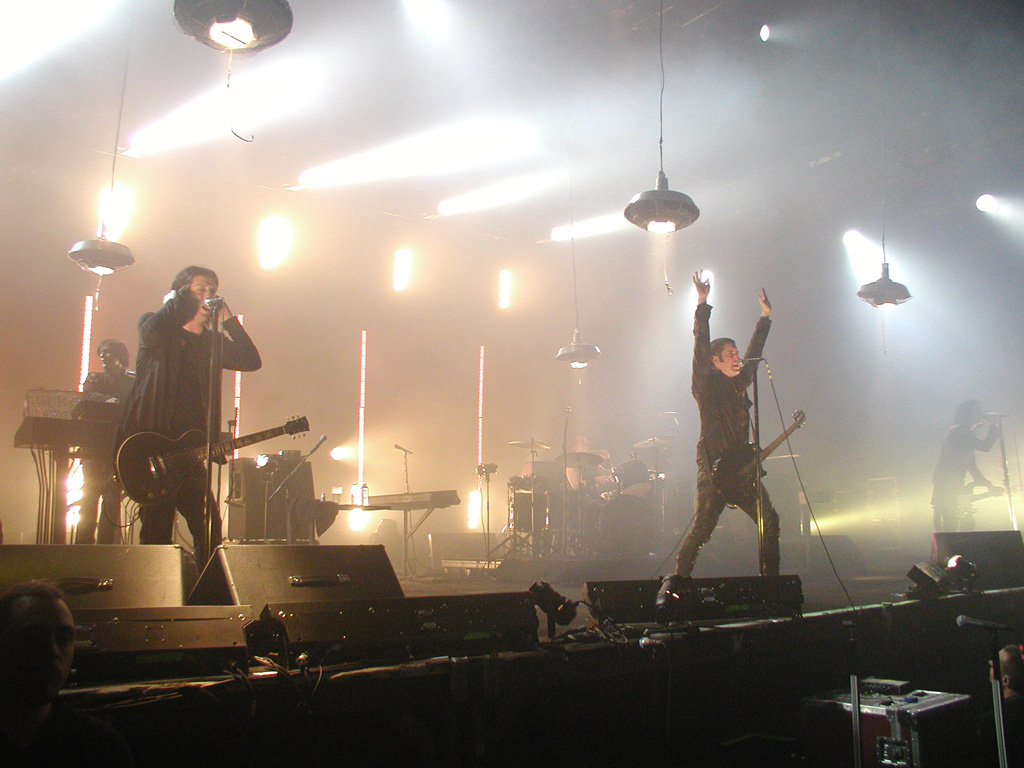
- Nine Inch Nails during the Performance 2007 tour. From left to right: (front) White, Reznor, North, (back) Cortini, Freese
- Location: Europe; Australia; Asia; North America
- Associated album: Year Zero
- Start date: February 10, 2007
- End date: September 18, 2007
- Legs: 3
- No. of shows: 76; 58 in Europe; 10 in Asia; 7 in Australia; 1 in North America

Nine Inch Nails concert chronology
- Live: With Teeth Tour (2005-06); Performance 2007 (2007); Lights in the Sky (2008)

Two months before the release of their fifth full-length album, Year Zero, industrial rock band Nine Inch Nails began a new tour, officially called Performance 2007. The tour initially started off as a 'best-of' tour (since no songs from Year Zero were played at the first few days) but later transformed into a direct Year Zero support tour.

Prior to the beginning of the tour, Trent Reznor in an interview described it as an opportunity to play with the same line-up again, visiting some places the band did not play in before and revisiting music from all the different areas of Nine Inch Nails rather than focusing entirely on the new album.

The production on this tour was minimal so the heaviest setlist rotation in the band's history occurred, covering about 50 songs from all their albums.

== Songlist ==
Album	Song	Times
Pretty Hate Machine (1989)	"Head Like a Hole"	77
Pretty Hate Machine (1989)	"Terrible Lie"	33
Pretty Hate Machine (1989)	"Down in It"	20
Pretty Hate Machine (1989)	"Something I Can Never Have"	24
Pretty Hate Machine (1989)	"Sin"	29
Broken (1992)	"Wish"	79
Broken (1992)	"Last"	32
Broken (1992)	"Help Me I Am in Hell"	53
Broken (1992)	"Gave Up"	66
The Downward Spiral (1994)	"Mr. Self Destruct"	19
The Downward Spiral (1994)	"Piggy"	36
The Downward Spiral (1994)	"Heresy"	37
The Downward Spiral (1994)	"March of the Pigs"	76
The Downward Spiral (1994)	"Closer"	68
The Downward Spiral (1994)	"Ruiner"	20
The Downward Spiral (1994)	"The Becoming"	9
The Downward Spiral (1994)	"Eraser"	67
The Downward Spiral (1994)	"Reptile"	21
The Downward Spiral (1994)	"Hurt"	66
The Fragile (1999)	"Somewhat Damaged"	18
The Fragile (1999)	"The Day the World Went Away"	27
The Fragile (1999)	"The Frail"	27
The Fragile (1999)	"The Wretched"	21
The Fragile (1999)	"We're in This Together"	4
The Fragile (1999)	"The Fragile"	6
The Fragile (1999)	"Even Deeper"	3
The Fragile (1999)	"No, You Don't"	51
The Fragile (1999)	"La Mer"	26
The Fragile (1999)	"Into the Void"	21
The Fragile (1999)	"Starfuckers, Inc."	5
The Fragile (1999)	"The Big Come Down"	16
With Teeth (2005)	"You Know What You Are?"	16
With Teeth (2005)	"The Collector"	4
With Teeth (2005)	"The Hand That Feeds"	80
With Teeth (2005)	"Love Is Not Enough"	8
With Teeth (2005)	"With Teeth"	2
With Teeth (2005)	"Only"	63
With Teeth (2005)	"The Line Begins To Blur"	7
Year Zero (2007)	"HYPERPOWER!"	35
Year Zero (2007)	"The Beginning of the End"	53
Year Zero (2007)	"Survivalism"	69
Year Zero (2007)	"The Good Soldier"	35
Year Zero (2007)	"Me, I'm Not"	34
Year Zero (2007)	"Capital G"	9
Year Zero (2007)	"The Great Destroyer"	24
Covers	"Get Down, Make Love" (Queen)	4
Covers	"Suck" (Pigface)	49
Covers	"Dead Souls" (Joy Division)	31
Songs from soundtracks movies	"Burn" (Natural Born Killers)	63
Songs from soundtracks movies	"Deep" (Lara Croft: Tomb Raider)	8

== Band line-up ==
- Trent Reznor – Lead vocals, guitar, keyboards, tambourine, mbira
- Aaron North – Guitar, keyboards, backup vocals
- Jeordie White – Bass guitar, guitar, keyboards, backup vocals
- Alessandro Cortini – Keyboards, programming, guitar, bass guitar, backup vocals
- Josh Freese – Drums

== Tour legs ==
=== Europe (Spring Tour) ===
==== Notes ====
Two Year Zero songs made their debut on this leg ("Survivalism" and "The Beginning of the End"), as well as a few old, never before played live songs: "Last" from Broken, "We're in This Together" from The Fragile and a deconstructed version of "The Fragile" from Still. At a show in Madrid, Spain, ten tracks from The Downward Spiral were performed, the first seven of which were performed in their exact order on the album; three of these ("Heresy", "Ruiner", "The Becoming") returned to the setlist for the first time since the Self-Destruct tour.

During a concert in Lisbon, Portugal, a USB flash drive was found in a men's bathroom stall containing an intentionally leaked high-quality MP3 of the track "My Violent Heart", a song from the then-unreleased album, Year Zero. A second USB drive was found after a concert in Barcelona, containing the track "Me, I'm Not".

On April 18, Nine Inch Nails fans received in-game telephone-calls in which they were invited to a "resistance meeting" in Los Angeles. At the meeting, fans attended a fictional Art is Resistance meeting, and were later rewarded by an unannounced performance by Nine Inch Nails. The concert was cut short as the meeting was raided by a fictional SWAT team and the audience was rushed out of the building.

==== Support acts ====
- The Popo
- Ladytron

==== Dates ====
Date	City	Country	Venue
February 10, 2007	Lisbon	Portugal	Coliseum
February 11, 2007	Lisbon	Portugal	Coliseum
February 12, 2007	Lisbon	Portugal	Coliseum
February 14, 2007	Madrid	Spain	La Riviera
February 15, 2007	Madrid	Spain	La Riviera
February 16, 2007	Bilbao	Spain	Pabellon de la Casilla
February 18, 2007	Barcelona	Spain	Razzmatazz
February 19, 2007	Barcelona	Spain	Razzmatazz
February 21, 2007	Paris	France	Olympia
February 22, 2007	Paris	France	Olympia
February 23, 2007	Lille	France	Zenith de Lille
February 25, 2007	Manchester	England	Manchester Apollo
February 26, 2007	Manchester	England	Manchester Apollo
February 28, 2007	Glasgow	Scotland	Carling Academy Glasgow
March 1, 2007	Glasgow	Scotland	Carling Academy Glasgow
March 3, 2007	Nottingham	England	Trent FM Arena Nottingham
March 4, 2007	Birmingham	England	Carling Academy Birmingham
March 7, 2007	London	England	Brixton Academy
March 8, 2007	London	England	Brixton Academy
March 10, 2007	London	England	Brixton Academy
March 11, 2007	London	England	Brixton Academy
March 14, 2007	Cologne	Germany	Palladium
March 15, 2007	Dortmund	Germany	Westfallenhalle2
March 16, 2007	Tilburg	Netherlands	013
March 18, 2007	Brussels	Belgium	Ancienne Belgique
March 19, 2007	Brussels	Belgium	Ancienne Belgique
March 21, 2007	Amsterdam	Netherlands	Paradiso
March 22, 2007	Amsterdam	Netherlands	Paradiso
March 24, 2007	Berlin	Germany	Columbiahalle
March 25, 2007	Berlin	Germany	Columbiahalle
March 26, 2007	Stuttgart	Germany	Porsche Arena
March 28, 2007	Munich	Germany	Colosseum
March 29, 2007	Vienna	Austria	Gasometer
March 30, 2007	Vienna	Austria	Gasometer
April 1, 2007	Milan	Italy	Alcatrazz
April 2, 2007	Zürich	Switzerland	Volkshaus
April 4, 2007	Frankfurt	Germany	Jahrhunderthalle
April 6, 2007	Copenhagen	Denmark	Vega
April 7, 2007	Orlo	Norway	Sentrum Scene
April 8, 2007	Stockholm	Sweden	Annexet
April 10, 2007	Helsinki	Finland	Old Ice Hall

=== Australia / Asia (Spring Tour) ===
==== Notes ====
This leg featured the same production as the previous European leg, but was more focused on Year Zero, as it had 5-6 Year Zero songs in each show setlist, while previously there were no more than two. "HYPERPOWER!", "The Good Soldier", "Me, I'm Not" and "Capital G" made their live debut on this leg.

==== Support act ====
- Serena Maneesh

==== Dates ====
Date	City	Country	Venue
May 7, 2007	Brisbane	Australia	Riverstage
May 9, 2007	Sydney	Australia	Luna Park (Big Top)
May 13, 2007	Melbourne	Australia	Metro Nightclub
May 14, 2007	Melbourne	Australia	Metro Nightclub
May 15, 2007	Melbourne	Australia	Metro Nightclub
May 18, 2007	Tokyo	Japan	Studio Coast
May 19, 2007	Tokyo	Japan	Studio Coast
May 20, 2007	Tokyo	Japan	Studio Coast
May 22, 2007	Nagoya	Japan	Zepp Nagoya
May 23, 2007	Osaka	Japan	Zepp Osaka
May 24, 2007	Osaka	Japan	Zepp Osaka

=== Europe (Summer / Fall tour and festival dates) ===
==== Notes ====
This leg featured one more song from Year Zero ("The Great Destroyer") and more extensive production, which included a traditional major visual section in the middle of the show, this time created for "Me, I'm Not", "The Great Destroyer", "Eraser" and "Only". The former two were played by Reznor, North and Cortini as a 3-piece, using a combination of live guitars and pre-programmed samples triggered onstage with computers and manipulated in real time using Ableton software.

==== Support acts ====
- Intacto
- Theodor Bastard
- Noisecut
- The Dandy Warhols
- Ladytron
- Alec Empire

==== Dates ====
Date	City	Country	Venue
August 1, 2007	Moscow	Russia	Luzhniki Arena
August 3, 2007	St. Petersburg	Russia	Jubileyny Arena
August 5, 2007	Helsinki	Finland	Ankkarock Festival
August 7, 2007	Stockholm	Sweden	Hovet
August 8, 2007	Oslo	Norway	Øya Festival
August 11, 2007	Budapest	Hungary	Sziget Festival
August 12, 2007	Bratislava	Slovakia	Incheba Hall
August 13, 2007	Prague	Czech Republic	Slavia Zimni Sdion
August 15, 2007	Avenches	Switzerland	Rock Oz’Arènes Festival
August 16, 2007	Salzburg	Austria	FM4 Frequency Festival
August 18, 2007	Hasselt	Belgium	Pukkelpop
August 19, 2007	Biddinghuizen	Netherlands	Lowlands Festival
August 21, 2007	Edinburgh	Scotland	T on the Fringe (Meadowbank Sports Centre)
August 22, 2007	Dublin	Ireland	Marlay Park
August 24, 2007	Leeds	England	Leeds Festival
August 26, 2007	Reading	England	Reading Festival
August 28, 2007	Birmingham	England	Birmingham Academy
August 30, 2007	Wolverhampton	England	Wolverhampton Civic Hall
September 1, 2007	Konstanz	Germany	Rock AM See Festival
September 2, 2007	Bologna	Italy	Independent Day Festival
September 3, 2007	Munich	Germany	Circus Krone

=== Asia / Australia / North America ===
==== Notes ====
This particular leg included the band's first ever performance in China.

The Honolulu Star-Bulletin reported that the September 18 show in Honolulu would be the last performance of the current incarnation of the Nine Inch Nails live band. Reznor told the newspaper "at this point, I want to switch things around a bit. Nine Inch Nails as a rock band configuration, we've done it and we've done it again. I see other ways I can present the material in concert, more challenging, something new. I don't want it to go stale". In the same article, Reznor also admitted that "the idea of five guys playing loud music [for] two hours... has got to change once finances come into play, especially performing in markets outside of the mainland U.S. I want to whittle things down".

==== Support acts ====
- Unkle
- The Lovesong
- White Rose Movement

==== Dates ====
Date	City	Country	Venue
September 5, 2007	Tel Aviv	Israel	Israel Trade Fairs & Convention Center
September 9, 2007	Beijing	China	Beijing Pop Festival
September 11, 2007	Seoul	South Korea	Olympic Hall
September 13, 2007	Hong Kong	China	Asia World Expo (Hall 10)
September 15, 2007	Sydney	Australia	Luna Park (Big Top)
September 16, 2007	Sydney	Australia	Hordern Pavilion
September 18, 2007	Honolulu, Hawaii	United States	Blaisdell Arena
