= Year Zero (album) =

Studio album by Nine Inch Nails
- Released: April 17, 2007
- Recorded: September–December 2006
- Genres: Industrial rock; electronic; digital hardcore; electro-industrial
- Length: 63:42
- Label: Interscope
- Producers: Trent Reznor; Atticus Ross

Nine Inch Nails chronology
With Teeth (2005)	Year Zero (2007)	Year Zero Remixed (2007)

Halo numbers chronology
Halo 23 (2007)	Halo 24 (2007)	Halo 25 (2007)

Singles from Year Zero
- 1. "Survivalism" Released: March 13, 2007; 2. "Capital G" Released: June 11, 2007

Year Zero is the fifth studio album by the American industrial rock band Nine Inch Nails, released by Interscope Records on April 17, 2007. Conceived while touring in support of the band's previous album, With Teeth (2005), the album was recorded in late 2006. It was produced by Trent Reznor and Atticus Ross, and was the band's first studio album since 1994's The Downward Spiral that was not co-produced by long-time collaborator Alan Moulder. It was the band's last album for Interscope until the Tron: Ares soundtrack in 2025, following Reznor's departure after the album's release due to a dispute regarding overseas pricing.

In contrast to the introspective style of songwriting featured on the band's previous work, the record is a concept album that criticizes contemporary policies of the United States government by presenting a dystopian vision of the year 2022. It was part of a larger Year Zero project, which included a remix album, an alternate reality game of the same name, as well as a conceived television or film adaptation. The game expanded upon the album's storyline, using websites, pre-recorded phone messages, murals, among other media in promotion of the project. The album was promoted by two singles: "Survivalism" and "Capital G".

Year Zero received positive reviews from critics, who complimented its concept and production, as well as the accompanying alternate reality game. The album reached number 2 in the United States, number 6 in the United Kingdom, and the top 10 in some other countries.

== Recording ==
"This record began as an experiment with noise on a laptop in a bus on tour somewhere. That sound led to a daydream about the end of the world. That daydream stuck with me and over time revealed itself to be much more ... it takes place about fifteen years in the future. Things are not good. If you imagine a world where greed and power continue to run their likely course, you'll have an idea of the backdrop. The world has reached the breaking point – politically, spiritually and ecologically. Written from various perspectives of people in this world, Year Zero examines various viewpoints set against an impending moment of truth."

— Trent Reznor on Year Zero, 2007

In a 2005 interview with Kerrang!, Trent Reznor raised his intentions to write material for a new release while on tour promoting With Teeth. He reportedly began work on the new album by September 2006. Reznor devised much of the album's musical direction on his laptop. Reznor told Kerrang! in a later interview, "When I was on the Live: With Teeth tour, to keep myself busy I just really hunkered down and was working on music the whole time, so this kept me in a creative mode and when I finished the tour I felt like I wasn't tired and wanted to keep at it."

The limitations of devising the album's musical direction on a tour bus forced Reznor to work differently from usual. Reznor said, "I didn't have guitars around because it was too much hassle ... It was another creative limitation ... If I were in my studio, I would have done things the way I normally do them. But not having the ability to do that forced me into trying some things that were fun to do."

By the end of the tour, Reznor began work on the album's lyrical concepts, attempting to break away from his typically introspective approach. Reznor drew inspiration from his concern at the state of affairs in the United States and at what he envisioned as the country's political, spiritual, and social direction. Year Zero was mixed in January 2007, and Reznor stated on his blog that the album was finished as of February 5. The album's budget was a reported US$2 million, but since Reznor composed most of the album himself on his laptop and in his home-studio, much of the budget instead went toward the extensive accompanying promotional campaign.

A song cut from the album included vocal work by Queens of the Stone Age's Josh Homme. The same year, Reznor contributed vocals to their song "Era Vulgaris", which was also cut from the album of the same name.

== Composition and themes ==
"The Great Destroyer"
Sample of "The Great Destroyer" that shows an example of the album's heavy use of electronic music.

The album's music features the styles of industrial rock, electro-industrial, electronic, and digital hardcore. Reznor called Year Zero a "shift in direction" in that it "doesn't sound like With Teeth". He also said that when he finishes a new album, he has to "go into battle with the people whose job it is to figure out how to sell the record. The only time that didn't happen was [for] With Teeth. This time, however, [he was] expecting an epic struggle. [Year Zero] is not a particularly friendly record and it certainly doesn't sound like anything else out there right now."

Fifteen original tracks were considered for inclusion on the album, which Reznor described as "Highly conceptual. Quite noisy. Fucking cool." Reznor also described the album as a "collage of sound type of thing", citing musical inspiration from early Public Enemy records, specifically the production techniques of the Bomb Squad. Most of Year Zero's musical elements were created by Reznor solely on his laptop, as opposed to the instrument-heavy With Teeth. AllMusic's review described the album's laptop-mixed sound: "guitars squall against glitches, beeps, pops, and blotches of blurry sonic attacks. Percussion looms large, distorted, organic, looped, screwed, spindled and broken." Many reviews of the album compared the album's electronic sound to earlier Nine Inch Nails releases such as The Downward Spiral and The Fragile, while contrasting its heavily modified sounds to the more "organic" approach of With Teeth. Many critics also commented on the album's overall tone, including descriptions such as "lots of silver and grey ambience" and reference to the album's "oblique tone". The New York Times review described the album's sound by saying "Hard beats are softened with distortion, static cushions the tantrums, sneaky bass lines float beneath the surface." The article went on to describe individual tracks: "And as usual the music is packed with details: "Meet Your Master" goes through at least three cycles of decay and rebirth; part of the fun of "The Warning" is tracking the ever-mutating timbres."

Many of the songs on the album feature an extended instrumental ending, which encompasses the entire second half of the three-minute long "The Great Destroyer". The album was co-produced by Reznor and Atticus Ross, mixed by long-time collaborator Alan Moulder, and mastered by Brian Gardner. The album features instrumental contributions by live band member Josh Freese and vocals by Saul Williams.

Nine Inch Nails' 2006 tour merchandise designs featured overt references to the United States military, which Reznor said "reflect[ed] future directions". Reznor later described Year Zero as "the soundtrack to a movie that doesn't exist". The album criticizes the American government's policies, and "could be about the end of the world". Reznor specifically cited what he labeled as the "erosion of freedoms" and "the way that we treat the rest of the world and our own citizens". Reznor had previously called the results of the 2004 US election "one step closer to the end of the world."

Even though the fictional story begins in January 2007, the timeline of the album and alternate reality game mentions historical events, such as the September 11 attacks and the Iraq War. From there, fictional events lead to worldwide chaos, including bioterrorism attacks, the United States engaging in nuclear war with Iran, and the elimination of American civil liberties at the hands of the fictional government agency the Bureau of Morality. Regardless of being fictional, a columnist of the Hartford Courant commented, "What's scary is that this doesn't seem as far-fetched as it should, given recent revelations about the FBI's abuse of the Patriot Act and the dissent-equals-disloyalty double-speak coming out of Washington in recent years."

== Artwork ==
Logo of Year Zero

The two states of the Year Zero disc: black when cooled, white when heated

All of the artwork for Year Zero was created by Rob Sheridan, art director for Nine Inch Nails, who is also credited for artwork on With Teeth, among other Nine Inch Nails releases since 2000. The album features a thermo-chrome heat-sensitive CD face which appears black when first opened, but reveals a black binary code on a white background when heat is generated from the album being played. The binary sequence translates to "exterminal.net", the address of a website involved in the alternate reality game. Reznor displayed displeasure at the extra dollars added to the CD's price in Australia for the thermo-coating.

Included with the album is a small insert that is a warning from the fictional United States Bureau of Morality (USBM), with a phone number to report people who have "engaged in subversive acts". When the number is called, a recording from the USBM is played, claiming "By calling this number, you and your family are implicitly pleading guilty to the consumption of anti-American media and have been flagged as potential militants."

It was named one of the best album covers of 2007 by Rolling Stone.

== Promotion ==
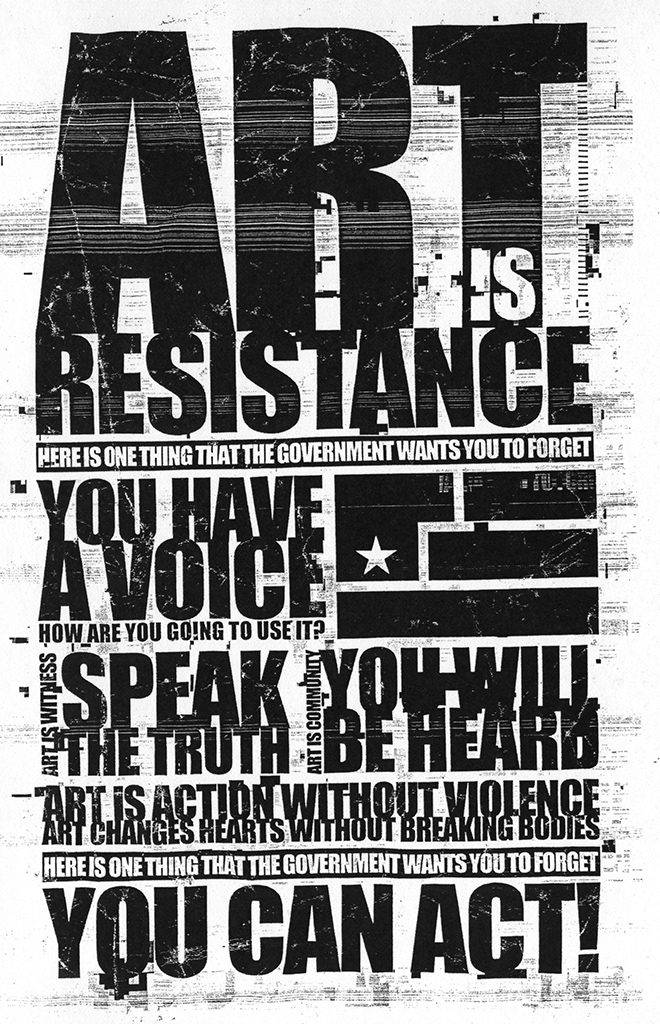
An Art is Resistance flier from the Year Zero alternate reality game

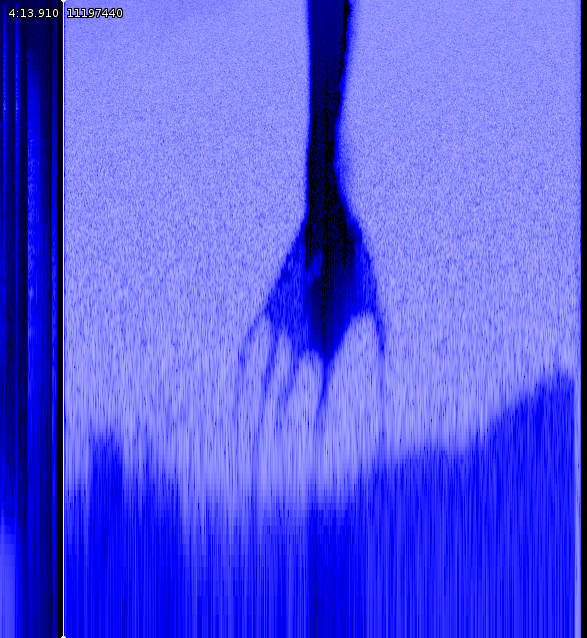
A spectrogram of the noise at the end of "My Violent Heart", one of the tracks on the USB drive found at a concert in Portugal

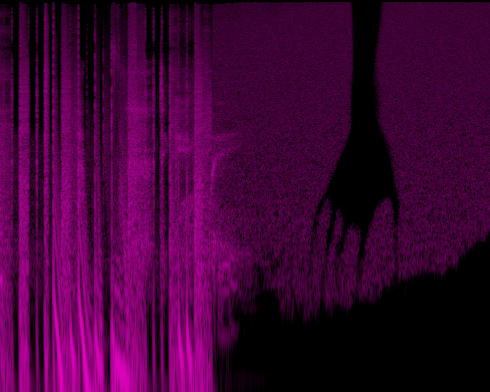
A spectrogram of "The Warning" off the CD release

While work continued on the album, Reznor hinted in an interview that it was "part of a bigger picture of a number of things I'm working on". In February 2007 fans discovered that a new Nine Inch Nails tour t-shirt contained highlighted letters that spelled out the words "I am trying to believe". This phrase was registered as a website URL, and soon several related websites were also discovered in the IP range, all describing a dystopian vision of the fictional "Year 0". It was later reported that 42 Entertainment had created these websites to promote Year Zero as part of an alternate reality game.

The Year Zero story takes place in the United States in the year 2022; or "Year 0" according to the American government, being the year that America was reborn. The United States has suffered several major terrorist attacks, and in response the government has seized absolute control on the country and reverted to a Christian fundamentalist theocracy. The government maintains control of the populace through institutions such as the Bureau of Morality and the First Evangelical Church of Plano, as well as increased surveillance and the secret drugging of tap water with a mild sedative. In response to the increasing oppression of the government, several corporate, government, and subversive websites were transported back in time to the present by a group of scientists working clandestinely against the authoritarian government. The websites-from-the-future were sent to the year 2007 to warn the American people of the impending dystopian future and to prevent it from ever forming in the first place.

The Year Zero game consisted of an expansive series of websites, phone numbers, e-mails, videos, MP3s, murals, and other media that expanded upon the fictional storyline of the album. Each new piece of media contained various hints and clues to discover the next, relying on fan participation to discover each new facet of the expanding game. Rolling Stone described the fan involvement in this promotion as the "marketing team's dream". Reznor, however, argued that "marketing" was an inaccurate description of the game, and that it was "not some kind of gimmick to get you to buy a record – it is the art form".

Part of this promotional campaign involved USB drives that were left in concert venues for fans to find during Nine Inch Nails' 2007 European tour. During a concert in Lisbon, Portugal, a USB flash drive was found in a bathroom stall containing a high-quality MP3 of the track "My Violent Heart", a song from the then-unreleased album. Another USB drive was found at a concert in Barcelona, Spain, containing the track "Me, I'm Not". Messages found on the drives and tour clothing led to additional websites and images from the game, and the early release of several unheard songs from the album. Following the discovery of the USB drives, the high-quality audio files quickly circulated the internet. Owners of websites hosting the files soon received cease and desist orders from the Recording Industry Association of America, despite Interscope having sanctioned the viral campaign and the early release of the tracks. Reznor told The Guardian:

The USB drive was simply a mechanism of leaking the music and data we wanted out there. The medium of the CD is outdated and irrelevant. It's really painfully obvious what people want – DRM-free music they can do what they want with. If the greedy record industry would embrace that concept I truly think people would pay for music and consume more of it.

On February 22, 2007, a teaser trailer was released through the official Year Zero website. It featured a quick glimpse of a blue road sign that said "I AM TRYING TO BELIEVE", as well as a distorted glimpse of "The Presence" from the album cover. One frame in the teaser led fans to a URL containing the complete album cover. In March, the multitrack audio files of Year Zero's first single, "Survivalism", were released in GarageBand format for fan remixing. The multitrack files for "Capital G", "My Violent Heart" and "Me, I'm Not" were released the following month, and files for "The Beginning of the End", "Vessel" and "God Given" were released on the month after that. In response to an early leak of the album, the entire album became available for streaming on Nine Inch Nails' MySpace page a week before the album's official release.

=== Tour ===
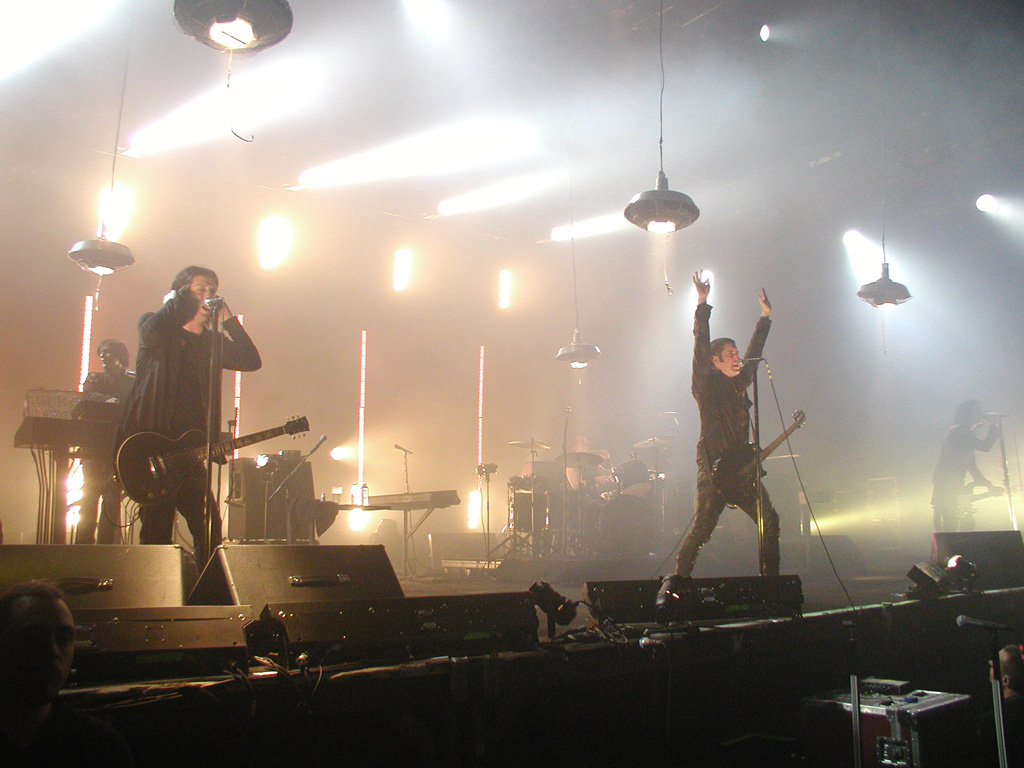
Nine Inch Nails during the Performance 2007 tour

After taking a break from touring to complete work on Year Zero, the Nine Inch Nails live band embarked on a world tour in 2007 dubbed Performance 2007. The tour included the band's first performance in China. Reznor continued to tour with the same band he concluded the previous tour with: Aaron North, Jeordie White, Josh Freese, and Alessandro Cortini. The tour spanned 91 dates across Europe, Asia, Australia, and Hawaii.

Between tour legs Nine Inch Nails gave a performance as part of the Year Zero game. A small group of fans received fictional in-game telephone-calls that invited them to a "resistance meeting" in a Los Angeles parking lot. Those who arrived were given "resistance kits", some of which contained cellphones that would later inform the participants of further details. After receiving instructions from the cellphones, fans who attended a fictional Art is Resistance meeting in Los Angeles were rewarded with an unannounced performance by Nine Inch Nails. The concert was cut short as the meeting was raided by a fictional SWAT team and the audience was rushed out of the building.

== Release ==
Upon its release in April 2007, Year Zero sold over 187,000 copies in its first week. The album reached number two on the Billboard 200 and peaked in the top 10 in six other countries, including Australia, Canada and the United Kingdom. The album's lead single, "Survivalism" peaked at number 68 on the Billboard Hot 100, and topped the Modern Rock and Canadian singles charts. The second single, "Capital G", reached number six on the Modern Rock chart.

In a post on the official Nine Inch Nails website, Reznor condemned Universal Music Group – the parent company of Interscope Records – for its pricing and distribution plans for Year Zero. He wrote that he hated Interscope for setting the price of the album higher than usual, humorously labeling the company's retail pricing of Year Zero in Australia as "ABSURD", [sic] and concluding that "as a reward for being a 'true fan' you get ripped off." Reznor went on to say in later years the "climate" of record labels may have an increasingly ambivalent impact on consumers who buy music. Reznor's post, specifically his criticism of the recording industry at large, elicited considerable media attention. Reznor continued his attack on Universal Music Group during a September 2007 concert in Australia, where he urged fans to "steal" his music online instead of purchasing it legally. Reznor went on to encourage the crowd to "steal and steal and steal some more and give it to all your friends and keep on stealin'." Although Universal never replied publicly to the criticism, a spokesperson for the Australian Music Retailers Association said "It is the same price in Australia as it is in the US because of the extra packaging." Due to the pricing dispute, plans to release a "Capital G" maxi-single in Europe were scrapped. The track was instead released as a limited-edition single, without a "Halo number", unlike most official Nine Inch Nails releases.

Year Zero was the last Nine Inch Nails studio album released on Interscope. Reznor announced in October 2007 that Nine Inch Nails had fulfilled its contractual commitments to Interscope and could proceed "free of any recording contract with any label", effectively ending the band's relationship with its record label.

=== Related projects ===
A remix album, titled Year Zero Remixed, was released in November 2007. Due to the expiration of his contract with Interscope Records, the album's release, marketing, and promotion were completely in Reznor's control. The album features remixes from artists including the Faint, Ladytron, Bill Laswell, Saul Williams, Olof Dreijer of the Knife, and Sam Fogarino of Interpol. Reznor himself strongly supports fan-made remixes of songs from the album, as evidenced by his decision to upload every song in multi-track form to the then-newly launched Nine Inch Nails remix website. Instrumental versions of the songs on Year Zero are available at the site for download in multiple formats, including MP3, WAV, GarageBand, and Ableton Live formats.

A planned film adaption of Year Zero became a television project in 2007. Reznor met with various writers and pitched the idea to television networks. The 2007–2008 Writers Guild of America strike affected the pre-production stage. Nevertheless, Reznor commented in 2008 that the project is "still churning along", and that he had begun working with American film producer Lawrence Bender. In 2010, Reznor started developing the Year Zero miniseries with HBO and BBC Worldwide Productions. Reznor and Bender collaborated with Carnivàle writer Daniel Knauf to create the science fiction epic. When asked about the miniseries during an "Ask Me Anything" session on Reddit on November 13, 2012, Reznor said it was "currently in a holding state" and explained, "We [Reznor and Sheridan] didn't find the right match with a writer, and really have been avoiding doing what we should have done from the beginning: write it ourselves. [...] This project means a lot to me and will see the light of day in one form or another." In 2017, during an interview promoting new Nine Inch Nails EP Add Violence, Reznor said that "They got so far as hiring a writer for it, but then it fell to shit because we never had the right writer. I should have just done it [myself]."

== Critical reception ==
Professional ratings
Aggregate scores
Source	Rating
Metacritic	76/100
Review scores
Source	Rating
AllMusic	3.5/5 stars
Blender	4/5 stars
Entertainment Weekly	B+
The Guardian	3/5 stars
Los Angeles Times	4/4 stars
MSN Music (Consumer Guide)	A−
Pitchfork	6.7/10
Rolling Stone	4/5 stars
Spin	2.5/5 stars
USA Today	3.5/4 stars

According to the review aggregator Metacritic, Year Zero received "generally favorable reviews" based on a weighted average score of 76 out of 100 from 28 critic scores. Robert Christgau described Year Zero as Reznor's "most songful album", while Thomas Inskeep of Stylus magazine praised it as "one of the most forward-thinking 'rock' albums to come down the pike in some time". Rob Sheffield of Rolling Stone called the album Reznor's "strongest, weirdest and most complex record since The Downward Spiral", and concluded that "he's got his bravado back." Rolling Stone ranked it at number 21 on its "Top 50 Albums of 2007" list.

Several reviewers also commented on the accompanying alternate reality game. Ann Powers of the Los Angeles Times, praised the album and game concept as "a total marriage of the pop and gamer aesthetics that unlocks the rusty cages of the music industry and solves some key problems facing rock music as its cultural dominance dissolves into dust." In relation to the declining music industry, Joseph Jaffe of Brandweek commented that such "mysterious marketing measures [...] are what's desperately needed to gain attention in this uncertain era of distribution dilemmas and sagging sales", also commending acts such as Nine Inch Nails and Radiohead for being "more innovative than marketers". Entertainment Weekly gave the album a B+, comparing it to The X-Files and calling it "A sci-fi concept album whose end-of-days, paranoia-drenched storyline has been disseminated via the Internet". It also stated: "Amid its carefully calibrated sonic assaults, Year Zero has a number of tracks that will stop you in yours. Sometimes, it's a matter of dropping the volume [...] Even his use of electronics has shifted to a new level [...] Is the truth in here? Dunno, but Reznor's claim that 'I got my violence in high def ultra-realism' sounds like gospel to us."

On the fictional world depicted in the album and promotional campaign, the Cleveland Free Times commented that the album's fictionalized world and characters "often seemed heavy-handed and forced", but also conceded that "its clotted claustrophobia suited its subject matter". Ann Powers added, "The songs on 'Year Zero,' each from the perspective of a character or characters already existent in the ARG, draw a connection between the music fan's passionate identification with songs and the gamer's experience of becoming someone else online." In 2008, 42 Entertainment won two Webby Awards for its work on the Year Zero game, in the categories of "Integrated Campaigns" and "Other Advertising: Branded Content".

== Track listing ==
All tracks are written by Trent Reznor.

No.	Title	Length
1.	"Hyperpower!" ( (Note: "Hyperpower!" is stylized in all caps.))	1:42
2.	"The Beginning of the End"	2:47
3.	"Survivalism"	4:23
4.	"The Good Soldier"	3:23
5.	"Vessel"	4:52
6.	"Me, I'm Not"	4:51
7.	"Capital G"	3:50
8.	"My Violent Heart"	4:13
9.	"The Warning"	3:38
10.	"God Given"	3:50
11.	"Meet Your Master"	4:08
12.	"The Greater Good"	4:52
13.	"The Great Destroyer"	3:17
14.	"Another Version of the Truth"	4:09
15.	"In This Twilight"	3:33
16.	"Zero-Sum"	6:14
Total length:		63:42

== Personnel ==
Credits adapted from the CD liner notes.

- Trent Reznor – vocals, writer, instrumentation, production, engineering and art direction
- Atticus Ross – production and engineering
- William Artope – trumpet on "Capital G"
- Brett Bachemin – engineering
- Matt Demeritt – tenor sax on "Capital G"
- Josh Freese – drums on "Hyperpower!" and "Capital G"
- Jeff/Geoff Gallegos – brass and woodwind musical arrangement, baritone sax on "Capital G"
- Brian Gardner – mastering
- Steve Genewick – engineering assistant on "Hyperpower!"
- Hydraulx – artwork
- Elizabeth Lea – trombone on "Capital G"
- Alan Mason – engineering
- Alan Moulder – engineering and mixing
- Rob Sheridan – artwork and art direction
- Doug Trantow – engineering
- Saul Williams – backing vocals on "Survivalism" and "Me, I'm Not"

== Charts ==
=== Weekly charts ===
Weekly chart performance for Year Zero
Chart (2007)	Peak position
Australian Albums (ARIA)	5
Austrian Albums (Ö3 Austria)	4
Belgian Albums (Ultratop Flanders)	14
Belgian Albums (Ultratop Wallonia)	27
Canadian Albums (Billboard)	3
Croatian International Albums (HDU)	15
Czech Albums (ČNS IFPI)	40
Danish Albums (Hitlisten)	24
European Albums (Billboard)	4
Finnish Albums (Suomen virallinen lista)	5
French Albums (SNEP)	17
German Albums (Offizielle Top 100)	6
Greek Albums (IFPI)	35
Hungarian Albums (MAHASZ)	38
Irish Albums (IRMA)	13
Italian Albums (FIMI)	18
Japanese Albums (Oricon)	17
Mexican Albums (Top 100 Mexico)	90
New Zealand Albums (RMNZ)	20
Norwegian Albums (VG-lista)	8
Portuguese Albums (AFP)	20
Scottish Albums (Official Charts)	7
Spanish Albums (Promusicae)	32
Swedish Albums (Sverigetopplistan)	7
Swiss Albums (Schweizer Hitparade)	13
UK Albums (Official Charts)	6
UK Album Downloads (Official Charts)	9
UK Rock & Metal Albums (Official Charts)	1
US Billboard 200	2
US Top Rock Albums (Billboard)	1

=== Year-end charts ===
2007 year-end chart performance for Year Zero
Chart (2007)	Position
US Billboard 200	116
US Top Rock Albums (Billboard)	24

== Certifications ==
Certifications for Year Zero
Region	Certification	Certified units/sales
United Kingdom (BPI)	Silver	60,000^{‡}
^{‡} Sales+streaming figures based on certification alone.
