= Capital G =

2007 Nine Inch Nails song

Single by Nine Inch Nails

from the album Year Zero
- B-side: "Survivalism" (Dave Sitek Mix)
- Released: June 11, 2007
- Recorded: 2006
- Genre: Electronic rock; glam rock
- Length: 3:49
- Label: Interscope
- Songwriter: Trent Reznor
- Producers: Trent Reznor; Atticus Ross

Nine Inch Nails singles chronology
"Survivalism" (2007)	"Capital G" (2007)	"Discipline" (2008)

"Capital G" is a song by American industrial rock band Nine Inch Nails from their fifth studio album, Year Zero (2007). It was released on June 11, 2007 as a limited-edition nine-inch vinyl in the United Kingdom, serving as the album's second and final single.

== Music and lyrics ==
Though numerous reviews of the album speculated that "G" might refer to the first initial of George W. Bush, Trent Reznor has stated that the "G" stands for "greed".

== Release and reception ==
"Capital G" was not released with a Halo number due to Reznor's increasing awareness of the overpricing of retail music, and his record label's alleged plans to overprice Halo releases to take advantage of Nine Inch Nails' dedicated fan base. Art collaborator Rob Sheridan confirmed this fact:

It will not be a halo. It's a simple 9" vinyl release the record company really wanted to put out—Europe only, I believe. Side A is Capital G, side B is the Dave Sitek Survivalism remix. It will be nice for the people who have the 9" collector box, but we kept a halo # off of it because it doesn't warrant one, and so regular collectors wouldn't feel any pressure to pick it up just for the sake of completeness.

— Rob Sheridan, The Spiral fanclub

The song was first played on radio on April 4, 2007. As of April 27, 2007, "Capital G" is listed on the Mediabase Jump! and Taking Off charts, which record the track's increase in radio airplay over seven days. "Capital G" officially became available for airplay on May 14–15, although it received the most adds in the alternative category during the week of April 27, according to Radio & Records.

The song was available for download as an "exhibit" in WAV format at exterminal.net, a website within the Year Zero alternate reality game revealed by decrypting a binary code sequence on the Year Zero's thermochrome disc when heated.

On April 26, 2007, the official Year Zero website published the multitrack audio files of "Capital G" for GarageBand and Logic Pro, as well as WAV files for other applications.

"Capital G" is Nine Inch Nails' fifth consecutive top 10 single on the Billboard Hot Modern Rock Tracks chart.

== Formats and track listings ==
- UK limited-edition 9" single

A. "Capital G" – 3:49
B. "Survivalism" (Dave Sitek Mix) – 4:30

- US promotional CD single (INTR-12130-2)
1. "Capital G" (edit) – 3:49
2. "Capital G" (album) – 3:49
- US promotional CD single (INTR-12230-2)
1. "Capital G" (Phones 666 RPM Mix) – 7:23
2. "Capital G" (Switch Remix) – 5:01
- German promotional CD single
1. "Capital G" (album) – 3:51
2. "Capital G" (edit) – 3:49
- European promotional 12" single

A. "Capital G" (Phones 666 RPM Mix) – 7:23
B. "Capital G" (Switch Remix) – 5:01

== Credits and personnel ==
- Trent Reznor – songwriting, production, vocals
- Josh Freese – drums
- Geoff "Double G" Gallegos – baritone saxophone
- Matt Demeritt – tenor saxophone
- Elizabeth Lea – trombone
- William Artope – trumpet
- Atticus Ross – production

== Charts ==
=== Weekly charts ===
Weekly chart performance for "Capital G"
Chart (2007)	Peak position
Canada Hot 100 (Billboard)	89
Czech Republic Modern Rock (ČNS IFPI)	13
Scottish Singles Sales (Official Charts)	38
UK Singles (Official Charts)	140
UK Rock & Metal (Official Charts)	2
US Alternative Airplay (Billboard)	6
US Mainstream Rock (Billboard)	25

=== Year-end charts ===
Year-end chart performance for "Capital G"
Chart (2007)	Position
US Alternative Songs (Billboard)	29

== See also ==
- List of anti-war songs
