= Year Zero (game) =

Alternate reality game

- Developer: 42 Entertainment
- Release: 2007
- Genre: Alternate reality game

Year Zero is an alternate reality game (ARG) by American studio 42 Entertainment based on the Nine Inch Nails concept album of the same name. Although the album was released on April 16, 2007, in Europe, and the following day worldwide, the game had been underway since roughly February 12, 2007, and was expected to continue for approximately eighteen months.

The game was created by 42 Entertainment, the same group responsible for the Halo 2 promotional alternative reality game I Love Bees. Frontman Trent Reznor called the game "a new entertainment form". In response to criticism regarding the promotion of the album, Reznor stated:

The term "marketing" sure is a frustrating one for me at the moment. What you are now starting to experience IS "year zero". It's not some kind of gimmick to get you to buy a record - it IS the art form... and we're just getting started. Hope you enjoy the ride.

== Premise ==
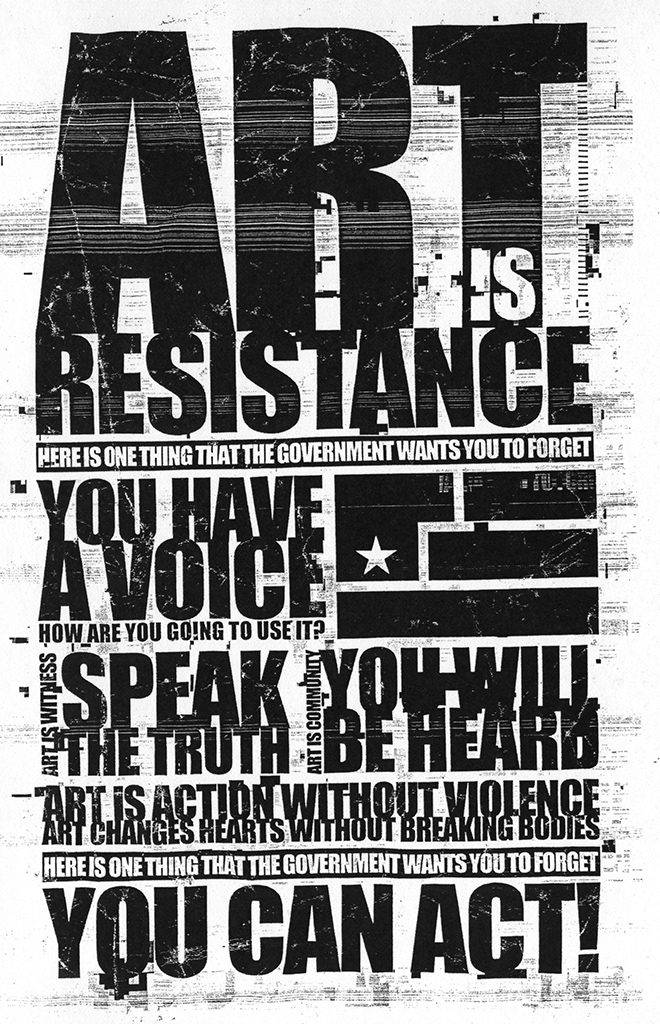
An Art is Resistance flier from the Year Zero ARG.

Reznor said that Year Zero is a concept album, "could be about the end of the world", and marked a "shift in direction" in that it "doesn't sound like With Teeth." The 2006 tour merchandise designs featured overt references to the United States military, which "reflects future directions."

In an interview with Gigwise.com, Reznor stated that the concept behind Year Zero was partially inspired by his feelings toward the Bush administration. He further explained,

I really wanted to focus on something that was at the forefront of my consciousness which is, as an American, I'm appalled by the behavior of our government, the direction that it has taken and the direction that it's taken everyone else in the world and its arrogance... I decided to write an essay about where the world might be if we continue down the path that we're on with a neo-con-esque government doing whatever it pleases...

To this end, the storyline of Year Zero borrows heavily from such well-known dystopian fiction as George Orwell's Nineteen Eighty-Four (government surveillance), Aldous Huxley's Brave New World (use of drugs to subdue the populace), Ray Bradbury's Fahrenheit 451 (large-scale censorship and uniformism), and Yevgeny Zamyatin's We (synthesis of church and state).

Specific plot elements bear a resemblance to the Philip K. Dick short story Faith of Our Fathers, including hallucinogens in the water supply, an oppressive, heavily militaristic state, aggressive government monitoring of the populace, and a venerated entity which manifests in many forms. In keeping with the dystopian theme, Year Zero takes place in 2022, the same year as the 1973 film Soylent Green.

== Plot ==
The story takes place in the United States in the year 2022, which has been termed "Year 0" by the US government, being the year that America was reborn. The U.S. had suffered several major terrorist attacks, including attacks on Los Angeles and Seattle. In response, the government granted itself emergency powers and seized absolute control on the country.

The U.S. government is now a Christian fundamentalist theocracy, maintaining control of the populace through institutions like the Bureau of Morality and the First Evangelical Church of Plano, and locked into near constant war abroad against their aggressors, with the implied ulterior motive to expand their spheres of influence. Americans must get licenses to marry, bear children, etc. Subversive activities can result in these licenses being revoked. Dissenters regularly disappear from their homes in the night, and are detained in federal detainment centers and sanitariums, if not executed.

The government corporation Cedocore distributes the drug Parepin through the water supply, under the guise of it being an "immune booster" to prevent future bioterrorism attacks. However, Parepin is actually a psychoactive drug, engineered to reduce aggression, affect memory retention, and instill great credulity toward authority. As a result, most Americans who drink the water become apathetic and carefree. Side effects such as schizophrenia-like behavior, muscle twitches, and anorgasmia are implied to have effective treatment only in urban and developed areas, discouraging people moving to rural and remote areas with untreated water.

There are several underground rebel groups, mainly operating online, most notably Art is Resistance and Solutions Backwards Initiative. The First Evangelical Church of Plano is a fundamentalist Protestant Christian church which is favored, and implied to be funded, by the neo-conservative government.

Amidst all of this are increasing sightings of what is labeled "The Presence", which manifests as a pair of massive ghostly hands and arms extending down from the sky into the ground. Despite early attributions of The Presence to drug-induced mass hysteria, it soon becomes clear that it is a physical phenomenon capable of being recorded on video and film, although grainy and unfocused. Theories vary on the real cause of the appearances, but the prevailing opinion appears to be that the hands represent God or some other equivalent supernatural force. The sightings become more and more frequent, and those who are "touched" by the hand begin to report their experiences, mostly of a feeling of terror and clarity.

On February 10, 2022, a government official named Doug is in his office tracking The Presence, while missing the birth of his daughter in Denver. He begins writing a letter to his then-unborn child, describing the state of the world and his family. Doug continually references The Presence, as more and more sightings are suddenly reported all around the planet at once. He says goodbye to his child, as the letter ends with a frantic, broken message that the Presence is above the Capitol Building and "the stars are going out like candles". The message cuts off suddenly, implying the end of the world.

Meanwhile, the Solutions Backwards Initiative - a group of students, professors, and computer experts - devise a successful means with which to send information back through time using quantum mechanics in order to prevent the dystopian future, and eventual apocalypse, they live in from ever occurring. The websites and music of the Year Zero alternate reality game are implied to be part of the information packets sent back through the wormholes, activated only moments after Doug's message.

== Media attention ==
The concept behind the Year Zero alternate reality game, as well as avid fan participation in the game, has caught the attention of the media numerous times. USA Today and Rolling Stone have cited fan site The NIN Hotline, forum Echoing the Sound, fan club The Spiral, and NinWiki as sources for new discoveries.

== Unrealized television project ==
In March 2007 Kerrang! Radio reported that Reznor was "in talks" for a potential film adaptation of the concept album. He had earlier noted Year Zero as "part of a bigger picture of a number of things I'm working on. Essentially, I wrote the soundtrack to a movie that doesn't exist." Reznor has commented that he is currently more interested in a television project than a film project. He has stated that he has a producer and has met with writers.

On August 10, 2007, Reznor announced that they would soon be taking the concept to television networks in an attempt to secure a deal. "We're about to pitch it to the network, so we're a couple of weeks away from meeting all of the main people, and we'll see what happens."

Progress stalled, reportedly because of the 2007–2008 Writer's Guild strike, though Reznor said the project was "still churning along" as of April 2008. He clarified in November 2012 that the project was "currently in a holding state" as he and Rob Sheridan had been unable to "find the right match with a writer". In 2017, during an interview promoting new Nine Inch Nails EP Add Violence, Reznor said that he had put together a "world bible" to assist with a potential adaptation by HBO and BBC America, but said: "They got so far as hiring a writer for it, but then it fell to shit because we never had the right writer. I should have just done it [myself]."

== Critical reception ==
Many reviewers of the Year Zero album also commented on the accompanying game. Ann Powers of The Los Angeles Times praised the album and game concept as "a total marriage of the pop and gamer aesthetics that unlocks the rusty cages of the music industry and solves some key problems facing rock music as its cultural dominance dissolves into dust."

In 2008, 42 Entertainment won two Webby Awards for their work on the Year Zero game, under the categories of "Integrated Campaigns" and "Other Advertising: Branded Content". 42 Entertainment was also awarded three medals in The One Show's entertainment award ceremony, including a gold medal in the "online gaming" category, a silver in the "music" category, and a merit award in the "online branded entertainment" category.
