= Survivalism (song) =

Nine Inch Nails song

Single by Nine Inch Nails

from the album Year Zero
- Released: March 13, 2007
- Recorded: 2006
- Genre: Alternative rock; electronic rock; industrial rock
- Length: 4:23
- Label: Interscope
- Songwriter: Trent Reznor
- Producers: Trent Reznor; Atticus Ross

Nine Inch Nails singles chronology
"Every Day Is Exactly the Same" (2005)	"Survivalism" (2007)	"Capital G" (2007)

Halo numbers chronology
Halo 22 (2007)	Halo 23 (2007)	Halo 24 (2007)

"Survivalism" is a song by American industrial rock band Nine Inch Nails from its fifth studio album, Year Zero (2007). It was released as the album's lead single. The single was released digitally on the iTunes Store on March 13, 2007, and the CD and vinyl singles were released internationally on April 2, 2007.

On February 14, 2007, a clip of the chorus to "Survivalism" was first heard by fans calling the telephone number 1-310-295-1040, which was found by joining discolored numerals on the back of a tour T-shirt. FMQB reported that "Survivalism" would arrive at radio stations on February 27 with an add date of March 6, but 102.1 The Edge in Toronto debuted the song on February 15, and on the next day, it was officially played on radio stations across the United States. It was later made available on Nine Inch Nails' Myspace page.

As with "The Hand That Feeds" and "Only", the "Survivalism" multi-track GarageBand file was released by the band for fan remixing on March 13. It can be downloaded on the album's website.

In July 2012, Canadian house musician deadmau5 produced a remix of the song, which was later included on his 2014 album while(1<2).

== Music video ==
Nine Inch Nails was scheduled to begin shooting a video for "Survivalism" on February 5, 2007, in the Los Angeles area. It was directed by Alex Lieu, Rob Sheridan, and Trent Reznor.

The video was circulated on the Internet on March 7, 2007, when Nine Inch Nails played the Carling Academy Brixton in London, England. USB pen drives containing low- and high-resolution versions of the video were found at different locations in the venue by concert-goers.

The video consists of a series of images from a console of secret cameras installed in an apartment block. As the camera moves between the footage, viewers are able to see into the lives of a number of residents, including:

- A catatonic older couple watching television with a portrait of Jesus behind them.
- A man looking after his drugged spouse (and in one scene possibly dripping or injecting the fictional drug "opal" in her eyes).
- Two men having anal sex in bed. (Covered by the US Bureau of Morality image in the TV edit.)
- A topless woman applying make-up in a bathroom. (Covered by the US Bureau of Morality image in the TV edit.)
- A man sitting at a table staring at his food.
- Three men in a shop (and later in an alley) working with stencils.
- A man in his cubicle surfing the Internet on his Apple laptop computer.
- Nine Inch Nails performing the song in a room.

Still image from the black and white video with the band.

There are also cameras directed at hallways and stairs inside the apartment block. After about a minute, these screens show a SWAT team armed with submachine guns assembling outside. They enter in formation, and eventually break down a door (on which the letters "REV 18 3–4" are stenciled, a reference to a passage in the Bible) and enter the apartment where the band is playing. The noise disturbs all the residents, who momentarily stop what they are doing and move off to investigate, then return to their activities. At this point, a number of cameras have been turned off and show static. The band is no longer in their room. It has been torn asunder and a large smear of blood is visible on the floor. The final shot shows a bleeding corpse being dragged around a corner and out of sight.

The Bible passage referenced by the door is from the Book of Revelation, a passage describing the fallen city-nation of Babylon and how she has been corrupted by luxury and adultery, and how people are being called to leave this whorish nation behind and not share in her immorality to keep from sharing in her judgement.

The time code in the monitor sometimes changes the last digit for a letter. This eventually spells out "THE_TURNEDTO_". In addition, several Bible verses that reference water and blood are shown throughout the video. "Isaiah 15:9" on the graffiti wall, "John 19:34" on the picture of Jesus behind the couple, and "II Kings 3:22" and "Exodus 7:21" in the board behind the man with the laptop. This led to the discovery of the Year Zero website, which was a collage of a hand picking a man up out of the wreckage of a crumbling bridge, claimed to be drawn by a prison inmate. There are various biblical quotations surrounding the drawing, and capital letters (un-capitalized letters in the second paragraph) align to form the word "francesca" once in the first paragraph, and twice in the second. Francesca has two documented meanings; 'free', and 'from Franconia' or 'from France'.

At the end of 2007, Rolling Stone readers voted the video the best music video of the year.

== Release and reception ==
"Survivalism" had 501 plays and debuted at number 28 on the Billboard Hot Modern Rock Tracks chart in the week of February 23, 2007. It eventually climbed to number one for one week, becoming NIN's fourth consecutive number one single (as well as their most recent), and debuted at number 68 on the Billboard Hot 100. Since Linkin Park's enormously more successful "What I've Done" single debuted at number one and replaced "Survivalism"'s position, the song however had fallen drastically after one week at number one, almost dropping off the top 20 of the Hot Modern Rock Tracks chart within just one month. The song dropped from number 7 to number 19 during the week of May 12, 2007, proceeded to fall to number 26 during the week of May 19, 2007, then hit number 37 in the week of May 26, 2007, leading the song to stay on the chart for only 13 weeks, a disappointment as a few other notable songs, despite not reaching number one on the chart, stayed in the top 20 for longer, such as Breaking Benjamin's "Breath" (number 3), Papa Roach's "Forever" (number 2), Incubus's "Dig" (number 4), and Rise Against's "Prayer of the Refugee" (number 7) ("Breath" stayed on the chart for 39 weeks). "Survivalism" debuted at number two on the UK Rock Singles Chart and at number 29 on the UK Singles Chart. The song became Nine Inch Nails' fourth consecutive top-10 single on the Billboard Hot Modern Rock Tracks chart.

The single debuted at number one on the Canadian Singles Chart (the only time a Nine Inch Nails single debuted at the top of a chart), a position which it maintained for six weeks.

== Track listings ==
Promotional CD
No.	Title	Length
1.	"Survivalism" (LP version)	4:22
2.	"Survivalism" (edit)	4:22

iTunes single (Halo 23i)
No.	Title	Length
1.	"Survivalism"	4:22

UK / international 2-track
No.	Title	Length
1.	"Survivalism"	4:22
2.	"Survivalism_Tardusted"	4:19

International CD maxi
No.	Title	Length
1.	"Survivalism"	4:22
2.	"Survivalism_Tardusted"	4:19
3.	"The Greater Good" (Instrumental)	5:03
4.	"Survivalism" (Video)

UK 9-inch single
No.	Title	Length
1.	"Survivalism"	4:22
2.	"Survivalism_OpalHeartClinic_Niggy_Tardust! (Escaped…"	4:18

== Credits and personnel ==
=== "Survivalism" ===
- Trent Reznor – lyrics, performance, and production
- Atticus Ross – production
- Thavius Beck – production on "Tardusted" and "OpalHeartClinic_Niggy_Tardust!(Escaped..." remixes
- Saul Williams – backing vocals

=== Music video ===
- Trent Reznor – co-director
- Susan Bonds – co-director
- Alex Lieu – co-director
- Rob Sheridan – co-director
- Eric Wycoff – director of photography

== Charts ==
=== Weekly charts ===
Weekly chart performance for "Survivalism"
Chart (2007)	Peak position
Austria (Ö3 Austria Top 40)	63
Canada (Canadian Singles Chart)	1
Canada Hot 100 (Billboard)	70
Canada Rock (Billboard)	17
Czech Republic Modern Rock (ČNS IFPI)	20
Denmark (Tracklisten)	15
Finland (Suomen virallinen lista)	7
Germany (GfK)	68
Scotland Singles (OCC)	7
Spain (Promusicae)	2
UK Singles (OCC)	29
UK Rock & Metal (OCC)	2
US Billboard Hot 100	68
US Alternative Airplay (Billboard)	1
US Mainstream Rock (Billboard)	14
US Pop 100 (Billboard)	66

=== Year-end charts ===
Year-end chart performance for "Survivalism"
Chart (2007)	Position
US Alternative Songs (Billboard)	37
