= Nine Inch Noize (album) =

2026 studio album by Nine Inch Nails and Boys Noize

Studio album by Nine Inch Nails and Boys Noize
- Released: April 17, 2026
- Genres: Electronic; industrial; rock
- Length: 46:41
- Labels: The Null Corporation; Interscope
- Producers: Boys Noize; Trent Reznor; Atticus Ross

Nine Inch Nails chronology
Tron Ares: Divergence (2026)	Nine Inch Noize (2026)

Boys Noize chronology
Challengers [Mixed] (2024)	Nine Inch Noize (2026)	7llvsion (2026)

Halo numbers chronology
Halo 37 (2026)	Halo 38 (2026)

Nine Inch Noize is an album by American industrial rock band Nine Inch Nails and German electronic musician Boys Noize, who perform under the collaborative banner Nine Inch Noize. It was released via the Null Corporation and Interscope Records on April 17, 2026. Described as a live, studio, and remix album, it consists of reworked versions of songs by Nine Inch Nails, a new version of a song by Soft Cell (also originally covered on the band's Closer To God single), and a cover of a song by How to Destroy Angels.

Nine Inch Nails and Boys Noize had previously collaborated on the soundtrack to Tron: Ares and its accompanying remix album Tron Ares: Divergence, as well as the Peel It Back Tour. The Nine Inch Noize album was announced ahead of their performance at Coachella 2026, the setlist of which is the structure of Nine Inch Noize. The album was praised by critics, who commented on the production and the interpretations of songs. The album placed highly in several digital and dance charts, including peaks within the top ten.

== Background and content ==
Nine Inch Noize is the collaborative musical project of Nine Inch Nails (Trent Reznor and Atticus Ross), and the German electronic musician Boys Noize (Alexander Ridha). These musicians had produced several previous collaborations: Challengers (Mixed) (2024), the production of Nine Inch Nails' Tron: Ares soundtrack (2025), and Boys Noize providing remixes on the Tron Ares: Divergence (2026) remix album. Their work on the film scores had inspired Reznor to express Nine Inch Nails "in more purely electronic terms" in live performances; Boys Noize supported Nine Inch Nails on their Peel It Back Tour (2025–2026), with the Nine Inch Noize act playing Coachella 2026, with vocal contributions by Mariqueen Maandig.

An electronic, industrial, and rock album, Nine Inch Noize features new versions of songs by Nine Inch Nails, including a new version of "Memorabilia" by Soft Cell (originally a B-side inclusion on the "Closer to God" single), and also a cover of "Parasite" by How to Destroy Angels. The album was recorded partially live, in studio settings, on planes, and elsewhere. The version of "She's Gone Away" takes its instrumental from Boys Noize's song "Girl Crush", and the version of "Parasite" incorporates production from Boys Noize's "Xpress Yourself". Musically, Nine Inch Noize has been described as a live album, studio recording, and remix album. The album's structure follows the setlist of Nine Inch Noize's Coachella 2026 performance, which took place a week before the album's release.

== Release and reception ==
Professional ratings
Aggregate scores
Source	Rating
Metacritic	80/100
Review scores
Source	Rating
AllMusic	4/5 stars
Clash	8/10
Consequence	B+
Kerrang!	4/5
Metal Hammer	3/5 stars
MusicOMH	3/5 stars
Northern Transmissions	7.6/10
Pitchfork	7.7/10
Rolling Stone	4/5 stars
Spill Magazine	10/10

Nine Inch Noize was digitally released on April 17, 2026, as Halo 38 in the halo numbering system, via the Null Corporation and Interscope Records. The record was first announced on April 8 via a billboard advertisement on the way to Coachella in Indio, California. According to the review aggregator Metacritic, Nine Inch Noize received "generally favorable reviews" based on a weighted average score of 80 out of 100 from eight critic scores. A few months after the digital release of Nine Inch Noize, pre-ordering for physical versions had commenced in vinyl, CD, and cassette formats, with a release date of October 30, 2026.

Critics praised the album's simultaneous nature of being a live album, studio album, and remix album; AllMusic's Neil Z. Yeung stated the album "goes beyond the idea of a 'remix'", while Pitchfork's Will Lynch assessed the record as "not so much a live album as a live-inspired album". Lynch described Ridha's contribution as an overt one, saying, "simply put, he brings the rave". Metal Hammer's Rich Hobson called the record "spacious and clean" unlike typical lusty "grime and nihilism" on Nine Inch Nails's other work. Some critics commented on the crowd noise; while Lynch felt the fading was not smooth and its lack of consistency made it seem "a little canned" like a laugh track, Consequence's Paolo Ragusa compared it to the shifts of brightness when traveling through a tunnel. Hobson bemoaned the live album as an "incomplete puzzle" without accompanying Coachella footage.

Clash's Robin Murray dubbed "Vessel" as "a torrent of explicit distorted digitalism", Lynch felt the track had a "sassy staccato funk" reminding him of Prince and Talking Heads, and Yeung remarked that the song's prominent beat heavily benefited from the remixing. Ragusa felt that "Closer" remained a "pop masterpiece" in its new interpretation, praising the "supercharged" remix for its enhancement of the synths and rework of the bridge, while Kerrang!'s James Hickie respected that the song was not overhauled extensively given its "iconic status". Lynch compared Ridha's style with "Closer", opining the new version felt "truly fresh", praising the rearrangement of the post-chorus arpeggio into isolation in the beginning, and said that the song managed to be a "fuck yes" moment on the album despite the obviousness of its inclusion. Of "Heresy", Ragusa wrote it had a new wave touch, and the remix made it "even freakier" and its beat was "even more destabilizing". Lynch felt this version "materially improves" upon the original and citing the pairing Maandig's voice with the opening drum loop as "elegant", while Murray wrote the "seductive duet ... sizzles with scarcely pent-up sexuality", and Hobson compared it to the style of Prince's Purple Rain (1984) and Godflesh.

== Track listing ==
All tracks are written by Trent Reznor, Atticus Ross and Alexander Ridha, except where listed, and are additionally subtitled "Nine Inch Noize Version".

Nine Inch Noize track listing
No.	Title	Writer(s)	Original release	Length
1.	"Intro"			1:17
2.	"Vessel"		Year Zero	4:17
3.	"She's Gone Away"	Reznor; Ross; Ridha; Maria-Cecilia Kelly	Not the Actual Events	3:32
4.	"Heresy"		The Downward Spiral	3:58
5.	"Parasite"	Reznor; Ross; Ridha; Mariqueen Maandig	How to Destroy Angels by How to Destroy Angels	4:30
6.	"Copy of A"		Hesitation Marks	4:08
7.	"Me, I'm Not"		Year Zero	4:22
8.	"Closer"		The Downward Spiral	5:44
9.	"The Warning"		Year Zero	3:39
10.	"Memorabilia" (Soft Cell cover)	David Ball; Marc Almond	"Closer" B-side single	3:26
11.	"Came Back Haunted"		Hesitation Marks	3:39
12.	"As Alive as You Need Me to Be"		Tron: Ares (Official Motion Picture Soundtrack)	4:14
Total length:				46:41

== Personnel ==
Credits are adapted from Tidal.

- Boys Noize – production, mixing
- Trent Reznor – production, mixing
- Atticus Ross – production, mixing
- Jacob Moreno – engineering

== Charts ==
Chart performance for Nine Inch Noize
Chart (2026)	Peak position
Australian Albums (ARIA)	43
Belgian Albums (Ultratop Flanders)	140
Belgian Albums (Ultratop Wallonia)	169
Japanese Digital Albums (Oricon)	21
Japanese Download Albums (Billboard Japan)	20
UK Album Downloads (Official Charts)	3
UK Dance Albums (Official Charts)	2
US Billboard 200	151
US Top Dance Albums (Billboard)	6
US Top Rock & Alternative Albums (Billboard)	40
