= Nine Inch Noize =

Collaborative group of Nine Inch Nails and Boys Noize

- Genres: Industrial rock; EDM; techno; electro-industrial
- Years active: 2025–present
- Spinoff of: Nine Inch Nails; Boys Noize
- Members: Trent Reznor; Atticus Ross; Boys Noize; Mariqueen Maandig

Nine Inch Noize is a collaborative musical project between American industrial rock band Nine Inch Nails and German-Iraqi electronic music producer Boys Noize (Alexander Ridha). The project emerged from their collaboration on Challengers (Mixed), the Tron: Ares soundtrack, and the subsequent Peel It Back Tour in 2025.

The project was announced on September 15, 2025, when Nine Inch Noize appeared on the poster for Coachella 2026. On April 8, 2026, the group announced their debut self-titled studio album, which was released on April 17, 2026.

== Background ==
According to Boys Noize, he and Trent Reznor had previously worked on a secret project that failed to materialize. In 2024, Reznor asked Ridha to do a remix of the Challengers score, which Reznor had worked on. Ridha turned the music into a continuous dance remix called Challengers (Mixed). Subsequently, they collaborated on the Tron: Ares soundtrack, with credits given to Boys Noize for "additional production" and co-production on key tracks like the single "As Alive as You Need Me to Be" and "Shadow Over Me".

The project was announced on September 15, 2025, when "Nine Inch Noize" appeared without explanation on the Coachella 2026 lineup poster reveal. The group made its live debut on April 11, 2026, at Coachella, with Mariqueen Maandig also providing vocals. The performance received rave reviews; SFGate declared it "one of the festival's best ever" while Pitchfork and Rolling Stone were among the publications that named it a highlight of the weekend. Nine Inch Noize was nominated for the 69th annual Grammy Awards for Best Engineered Album, Non-Classical category.

== Discography ==
Studio albums

- Nine Inch Noize (2026)
