= Ghosts V–VI =

Ghosts V–VI refers to two studio albums released by the band Nine Inch Nails in 2020. They were released simultaneously and for free online; thus, in regards to context, could be referenced as either a single entity, or as separate entities.

- Ghosts V: Together
- Ghosts VI: Locusts

== See also ==
- Ghosts I–IV
