= Tron Ares: Divergence =

Remix album by Nine Inch Nails
- Released: February 27, 2026
- Genres: Film score; industrial rock; electronic
- Length: 77:03
- Labels: Interscope; Walt Disney; The Null Corporation
- Producers: Trent Reznor; Atticus Ross

Nine Inch Nails chronology
Tron: Ares (2025)	Tron Ares: Divergence (2026)	Nine Inch Noize (2026)

Halo numbers chronology
Halo 36 (2025)	Halo 37 (2026)	Halo 38 (2026)

Tron Ares: Divergence is the fourth remix album by the American industrial rock band Nine Inch Nails, released through Interscope, Walt Disney Records, and The Null Corporation on February 27, 2026. It was the band's first remix album in almost twenty years – following Year Zero Remixed (2007) – and it consists of remixed versions of tracks from their score for Tron: Ares (2025) in addition to previously unreleased material from the film's scoring sessions.

== Release and reception ==
Professional ratings
Review scores
Source	Rating
AllMusic	3.5/5 stars
Pitchfork	7.5/10

The remix album was a surprise release with no previous announcements or acknowledgment other than "an image of what appeared to be a cyber-looking grid in green and black among a collection of Polaroid photos of fans from the current leg of its Peel It Back Tour posted to the group's Instagram account on February 26, 2026. That image turned out to be a snippet of the cover art for Tron Ares: Divergence."

It was received positively upon its release. Metal Injection described the remixes as "inventive" and "radical," with each remixer "lending their distinctive sonic signature to reinterpretations of Trent Reznor and Atticus Ross' cinematic soundscapes [...] blending atmospheric instrumentals [and] industrial heaviness." Pitchfork commended the record's "strong cast of remixers" which "retool[ed] the film score into a stylish and confident, if occasionally tedious, album of aggressive dance music that stands on its own." The publication lauded the majority of the reworkings – most notably Arca's, which writer Sadie Sartini Garner deemed "the album's best and most interesting track" – and further described Divergence as "the first [Nine Inch Nails] remix album that improves on its source so much it threatens to obviate the original. Why listen to TRON: Ares when you have this?"

== Track listing ==
All tracks are written by Trent Reznor and Atticus Ross.

Disc 1 track listing
No.	Title	Producer(s)	Length
1.	"Converge"	Trent Reznor; Atticus Ross	1:37
2.	"I Know You Can Feel It" (Mark Pritchard remix)	Reznor; Ross; Jack Dangers^{[a]}	5:32
3.	"Godmode"	Reznor; Ross	3:02
4.	"A Question of Trust" (Boys Noize remix)	Reznor; Ross; Boys Noize^{[a]}	3:35
5.	"Operand"	Reznor; Ross	3:30
6.	"Zero State"	Reznor; Ross	3:00
7.	"Empathetic Response" (Lanark Artefax remix)	Reznor; Ross; Boys Noize^{[a]}	3:57
8.	"100% Expendable" (Chilly Gonzales remix)	Reznor; Ross; Boys Noize^{[a]}	2:33
9.	"Who Wants to Live Forever" (featuring Judeline; Danny L Harle remix)	Reznor; Ross; Hudson Mohawke; Ian Kirkpatrick^{[v]}	3:06
10.	"Infiltrator" (Jack Dangers remix)	Reznor; Ross; Boys Noize	7:01
11.	"A Framework"	Reznor; Ross	3:38
12.	"Ghost in the Machine" (Boys Noize remix)	Reznor; Ross; Boys Noize^{[a]}	5:06
13.	"What Have You Done?" (Boys Noize remix)	Reznor; Ross; Boys Noize^{[a]}	4:44
14.	"As Alive as You Need Me to Be" (Pixel Grip remix)	Reznor; Ross; Boys Noize; Hudson Mohawke^{[a]}; Kirkpatrick^{[a]}; BJ Burton^{[a]}	4:47
15.	"The First Betrayal"	Reznor; Ross	2:43
16.	"I Know You Can Feel It" (Working Men's Club remix)	Reznor; Ross; Jack Dangers^{[a]}	6:18
17.	"Shadow Over Me" (The Dare remix)	Reznor; Ross; Boys Noize; Kirkpatrick^{[a]}	3:07
18.	"Terminal"	Reznor; Ross	3:02
19.	"Forked Reality" (Schwefelgelb remix)	Reznor; Ross; Boys Noize^{[a]}	4:40
20.	"As Alive as You Need Me to Be" (Arca remix)	Reznor; Ross; Boys Noize; Hudson Mohawke^{[a]}; Kirkpatrick^{[a]}; Burton^{[a]}	2:51
Total length:			77:03

=== Notes ===
- ^{^[a]} indicates an additional producer.
- ^{^[v]} indicates a vocal producer.
- Disc 2 is the original track listing of Tron: Ares score.

== Personnel ==
Credits are adapted from Tidal.

=== Nine Inch Nails ===
- Trent Reznor – programming, recording arrangement (all tracks); mixing (tracks 1, 3–8, 10–13, 15, 18, 19)
- Atticus Ross – programming, recording arrangement (all tracks); mixing (1, 3–8, 10–13, 15, 18, 19)

=== Additional contributors ===
- Jacob Moreno – engineering
- Mike Marsh – mastering
- Idania Valencia – mastering (2, 7–10, 12–14, 16, 17, 19, 20)
- Randy Merrill – mastering (2, 7–10, 12–14, 16, 17, 19, 20)
- Bryce Bordone – engineering (2, 9, 14, 16, 17, 20)
- Serban Ghenea – mixing (2, 9, 14, 16, 17, 20)
- Mark Pritchard – remixing, mixing (2)
- Owen Penglis – bass, guitar, remix engineering (2)
- Louisa Revolta – background vocals (2)
- Steve Christie – engineering (2)
- Hudson Mohawke – additional programming (4, 7–10, 12–14, 16, 17, 19, 20), engineering (14, 20)
- BJ Burton – additional programming (4, 7–10, 12–14, 16, 17, 19, 20)
- Ian Kirkpatrick – additional programming (4, 7–10, 12–14, 16, 17, 19, 20)
- Dustin Mosley – engineering (4, 7, 8, 10, 13, 19)
- Boys Noize – remixing (4, 13), drum programming (5)
- Lanark Artefax – remixing (7)
- Chilly Gonzales – remixing (8)
- Danny L Harle – remixing (9)
- Eric J – mixing (9)
- Jack Dangers – remixing (10)
- Pixel Grip – remixing (14)
- Working Men's Club – remixing (16)
- The Dare – remixing (17)
- Schwefelgelb – remixing (19)
- Arca – remixing (20)

== Charts ==
Chart performance for Tron Ares: Divergence
Chart (2026)	Peak position
Belgian Albums (Ultratop Flanders)	89
Belgian Albums (Ultratop Wallonia)	159
French Physical Albums (SNEP)	67
French Rock & Metal Albums (SNEP)	13
Scottish Albums (Official Charts)	15
UK Albums Sales (OCC)	20
US Top Album Sales (Billboard)	16
US Top Dance Albums (Billboard)	13
