= The Killer (2023 soundtrack) =

The Killer (Original Score)

Film score by Trent Reznor and Atticus Ross
- Released: November 10, 2023
- Recorded: 2023
- Genre: Film score
- Length: 52:24
- Label: The Null Corporation
- Producers: Trent Reznor; Atticus Ross

Trent Reznor and Atticus Ross chronology
Teenage Mutant Ninja Turtles: Mutant Mayhem (2023)	The Killer (2023)	Challengers (2024)

The Killer (Original Score) is the soundtrack to the 2023 film The Killer directed by David Fincher and features original music by Trent Reznor and Atticus Ross. The soundtrack was released through Reznor's The Null Corporation label on November 10, 2023, coinciding with its streaming release.

== Background ==
The Killer marked the duo's fifth consecutive collaboration with Fincher after The Social Network (2010), The Girl with the Dragon Tattoo (2011), Gone Girl (2014) and Mank (2020), whom signed the film in February 2023. Besides the duo's score, the film includes music from the Smiths. The song "I Know It's Over" played in the trailer. Fincher said he loved the idea of the Killer using it as a tool for "assuaging his anxiety", thinking this "funny and amusing". He also said Smiths music has a "witty sardonic nature" and "it would be amusing that that would be our window into him". Reznor and Ross' score released through the Null Corporation label coinciding with the streaming release on November 10, 2023.

== Reception ==
Tom Brehan of Stereogum said that The Killer's score shows them "in their comfort zone" as the score "is all hums and pulses and drones, with occasional shrieks of discordance. Their works makes it sound like some invisible machine is operating under the world's surface, pushing people against each other violently. That fits the film's whole message and aesthetic beautifully." Brian Truitt of USA Today wrote "frequent Fincher collaborators Trent Reznor and Atticus Ross' churning electronic score is symbolic of the main character's roiling, stressed-out inner turmoil that belies his stoic exterior." Justin Chang, in the Fresh Air talk show in National Public Radio said that "Trent Reznor and Atticus Ross' haunting electronic score surges in the background." Mimi Anthikad Chibber of The Hindu, Dominic Griffin of Looper and David Robb of Slant Magazine called the score "lush", "delightfully dissonant" and "throbbing".

Rohan Naahar of The Indian Express described it as "mostly a collection of guttural rumblings in the name of music". Uday Bhatia of Mint said "Atticus Ross and Trent Reznor supply what only they can, a score that's sometimes like huskies in a wind tunnel and sometimes the most beautiful electronic wash you've ever heard." Jonathan Romney of Screen International wrote "Fincher regulars Trent Reznor and Atticus Ross subtly ramp up the suspense with an electronic score that ranges from eerie ambient to minimal, ominously gurgling electronica." Richard Whittaker of The Austin Chronicle said Reznor and Ross' score "barely music but more rhythmical pops, fizzes, and growls."

== Track listing ==
No.	Title	Length
1.	"The Killer"	0:47
2.	"Fuck."	5:14
3.	"The Hideout"	2:20
4.	"Stick to the Plan"	3:45
5.	"The Sunshine State"	3:07
6.	"Consequences Are Automatic"	4:57
7.	"Empathy Is Weakness"	2:27
8.	"Never Hesitate"	4:25
9.	"The Brute, Pt 1"	1:33
10.	"The Brute, Pt 2"	4:15
11.	"Intruder"	4:25
12.	"The Expert"	5:31
13.	"Gonna Have to Call You Back, Marvin"	1:31
14.	"One of the Many"	6:41
15.	"Trailer"	1:26
Total length:		52:24

== Additional music ==
The film also includes the following songs from English rock band the Smiths (in order in which they appear in the film):

No.	Title	Length
1.	"Well I Wonder"	3:59
2.	"I Know It's Over"	5:49
3.	"How Soon Is Now?"	6:48
4.	"Hand in Glove"	3:23
5.	"Bigmouth Strikes Again"	3:13
6.	"Heaven Knows I'm Miserable Now"	3:36
7.	"Girlfriend in a Coma"	2:03
8.	"Shoplifters of the World Unite"	2:58
9.	"Unhappy Birthday"	2:45
10.	"This Charming Man"	2:43
11.	"There Is a Light That Never Goes Out"	4:05
Total length:		41:22

== Charts ==
Chart performance for The Killer (Original Score)
Chart (2023)	Peak position
UK Soundtrack Albums (Official Charts)	15
UK Album Downloads (Official Charts)	40
