= Ghosts VI: Locusts =

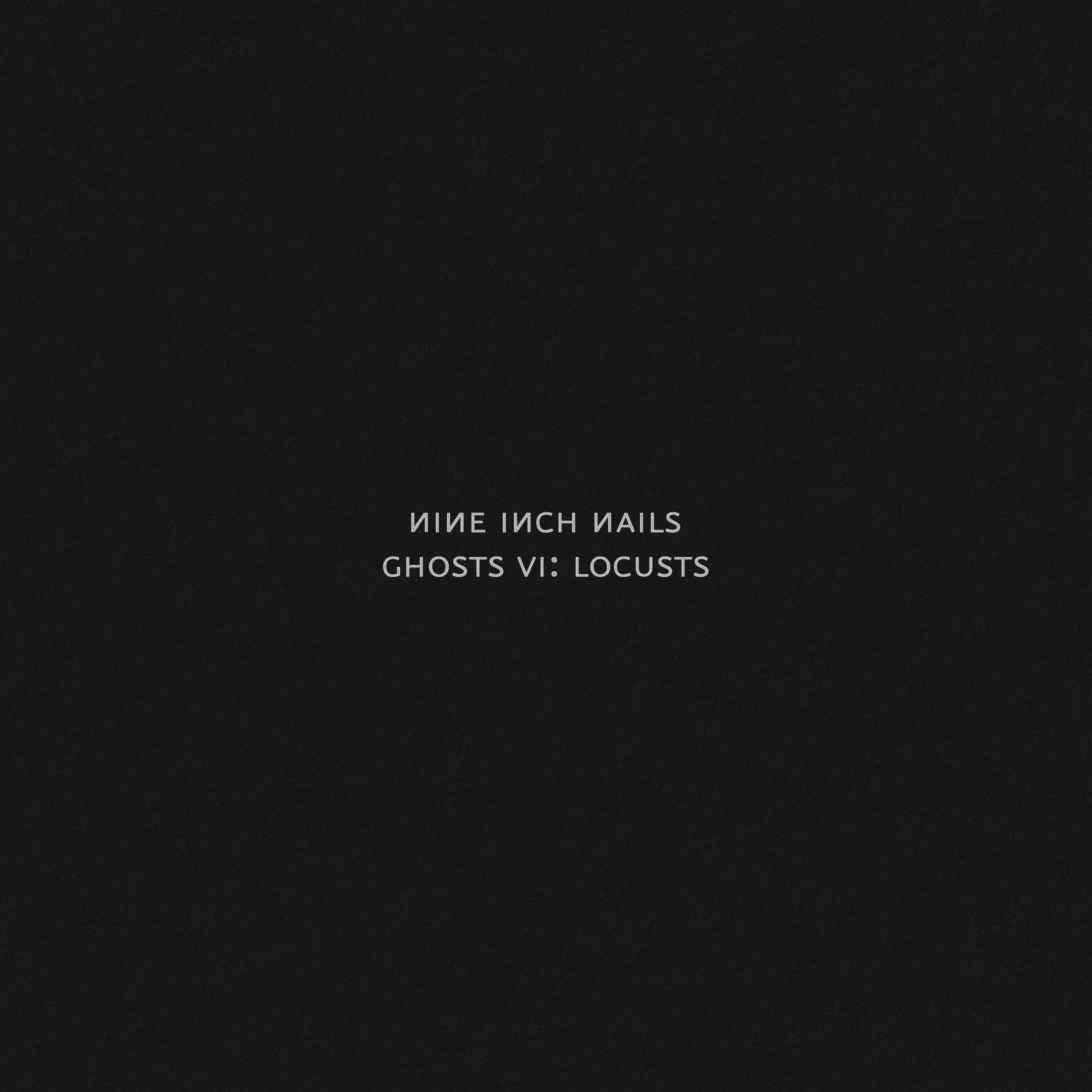

Studio album by Nine Inch Nails
- Released: March 26, 2020
- Genre: Dark ambient
- Length: 83:10
- Label: The Null Corporation
- Producers: Trent Reznor; Atticus Ross

Nine Inch Nails chronology
Ghosts V: Together (2020)	Ghosts VI: Locusts (2020)	Tron: Ares (Original Motion Picture Soundtrack) (2025)

Halo numbers chronology
Halo 33 (2020)	Halo 34 (2020)	Halo 35 (2025)

Ghosts VI: Locusts is the eleventh studio album by the American industrial rock band Nine Inch Nails. It was released as a free download on March 26, 2020, as a show of solidarity with the band's fans during the COVID-19 pandemic. It was released simultaneously with the tenth Nine Inch Nails album, Ghosts V: Together, and is the third release of the Ghosts series.

== Background ==
In 2019, after releasing their eighth soundtrack to the film Bird Box, Trent Reznor and Atticus Ross completed a subsequent score for The Woman in the Window; however, when the production studio decided to re-edit the film after test screenings, Reznor and Ross' score was withdrawn. When evoking the project, Reznor admitted, "It's frustrating when you did that much work and it's gone. And we were proud—and they were proud—of the movie that it was."

In March 2020, following two subsequent 2019 soundtracks Watchmen and Waves, Reznor announced two unexpected releases, Ghosts V: Together and Ghosts VI: Locusts, for free download through the official Nine Inch Nails website, YouTube channel, and streaming platforms: "Hours and hours of music. Free. Some of it kind of happy, some not so much." The band's website added, "As the news seems to turn ever more grim by the hour, we've found ourselves vacillating wildly between feeling like there may be hope at times to utter despair—often changing minute to minute. Although each of us define ourselves as antisocial-types who prefer being on our own, this situation has really made us appreciate the power and need for CONNECTION."

== Critical reception ==
Professional ratings
Aggregate scores
Source	Rating
AnyDecentMusic?	7.8/10
Metacritic	80/100
Review scores
Source	Rating
AllMusic	2.5/5 stars
Blabbermouth.net	9/10
Exclaim!	7/10
The Line of Best Fit	8.5/10
Loud and Quiet	8/10
NME	4/5 stars
Paste	8.7/10
Pitchfork	6.7/10
Rolling Stone	4/5 stars
Sputnikmusic	4.2/5

According to the review aggregator Metacritic, Ghosts VI: Locusts received "generally favorable reviews" based on a weighted average score of 80 out of 100 from 10 critic scores. NME critic James McMahon has described the record "as unsettling as a record entitled Locusts should be," while referring to the whole project as "music for daydreams." Kory Grow of Rolling Stone noted that "the music turns much darker in Ghosts VI, which, by proxy, makes it the more interesting of the two;" Grow also stated that "somehow they [Ghosts V–VI] sound more considered and complete than the initial Ghosts volumes." Pitchfork critic Sean T. Collins described the record as "anxious and anxiety-inducing" and further remarked: "Yet without Together's relatively rousing melodic template and pacing to propel it, Locusts often feels like its titular swarm, devouring itself for 80-plus minutes until there's not much left by the end."

For Jon Pareles of The New York Times, Ghosts VI offers none of the "meditative" or "melodic" "sanctuary" of Ghosts V. "It is harrowing from end to end, stoked with rhythmic tension, dissonance and amorphous noise: a soundscape of impending collapse and inexorable entropy." The album "thrusts the anxiety upfront. Tracks tick and pulse with the tensest kind of minimalistic repetition, and when piano and bell tones appear, they're usually brittle, not cozy."

Spin's John Paul Bullock thought that the record was "much more menacing" than Ghosts V, adding that "there's a feeling of forward momentum to the entire album but we might not like where it's headed." Remarking that "things sound and feel more industrialised" on Ghosts VI, Sputnikmusic's staff critic Simon referred to the album as "an all-out Lynchian nightmare." Neil Z. Yeung made a similar comparison in the review for AllMusic, remarking "A stray discordant key here, an ominous atmospheric sound effect there, Locusts may not offer any hope or solace, but it's objectively the more interesting experience."

== Track listing ==
Track listing for Ghosts VI: Locusts
No.	Title	Length
1.	"The Cursed Clock"	7:00
2.	"Around Every Corner"	10:53
3.	"The Worriment Waltz"	9:26
4.	"Run Like Hell"	5:38
5.	"When It Happens (Don't Mind Me)"	2:56
6.	"Another Crashed Car"	2:24
7.	"Temp Fix"	1:46
8.	"Trust Fades"	3:13
9.	"A Really Bad Night"	4:54
10.	"Your New Normal"	3:46
11.	"Just Breathe"	7:00
12.	"Right Behind You"	1:44
13.	"Turn This Off Please"	13:10
14.	"So Tired"	3:45
15.	"Almost Dawn"	5:35
Total length:		83:10

== Charts ==
Chart performance for Ghosts VI: Locusts
Chart (2020)	Peak position
US Top Album Sales (Billboard)	78
US Top Current Album Sales (Billboard)	60
