= Tron: Ares (soundtrack) =

Tron: Ares (Original Motion Picture Soundtrack)
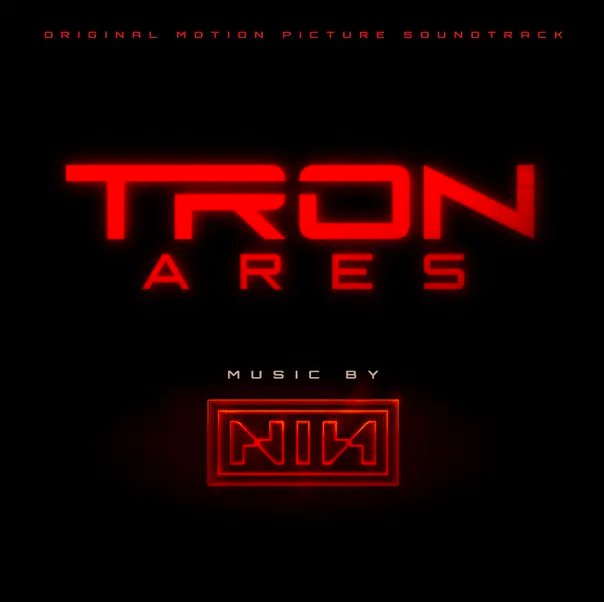
- Cover of the digital version

Soundtrack album by Nine Inch Nails
- Released: September 19, 2025
- Genres: Film score; industrial rock; electronic
- Length: 66:49
- Labels: The Null Corporation; Walt Disney; Interscope
- Producers: Trent Reznor; Atticus Ross

Nine Inch Nails chronology
Ghosts VI: Locusts (2020)	Tron: Ares (2025)	Tron Ares: Divergence (2026)

Halo numbers chronology
Halo 35 (2025)	Halo 36 (2025)	Halo 37 (2026)

Singles from Tron: Ares (Original Motion Picture Soundtrack)
- 1. "As Alive as You Need Me to Be" Released: July 17, 2025

Tron: Ares (Original Motion Picture Soundtrack) is the soundtrack album to the 2025 film of the same name, with twenty-four tracks featuring music by American industrial rock band Nine Inch Nails. The music was written, arranged, produced, mixed, programmed, and performed by Trent Reznor and Atticus Ross and is their first film score where they are credited under their band's moniker, instead of their individual names.

After Tron: Legacy (2010) composers Daft Punk disbanded, film producer Sean Bailey arranged for Reznor and Ross to succeed them for the next Tron film, following the duo's work for Disney scoring the Pixar film Soul (2020). Departing from Wendy Carlos's and Daft Punk's use of orchestras for Tron (1982) and Legacy, Nine Inch Nails did not use any orchestral material, aiming for a sound that Reznor described as "precise and unpleasant". He also felt that the inclusion of original songs made it so that it could be enjoyed as a conventional album by the band. The album features contributions by Boys Noize, Judeline, and Hudson Mohawke.

The album was released on September 19, 2025, by Walt Disney Records and The Null Corporation, under exclusive license to Interscope Records. Being met with a positive reception, many critics and publications considered Nine Inch Nails's soundtrack to be a standout aspect amidst a lackluster film. Critical commentary focused on the context of the music in the film proper, the recorded songs, and considered comparisons to past Nine Inch Nails and Tron music. At the 68th Annual Grammy Awards in 2026, the single "As Alive as You Need Me to Be" was nominated for Best Song Written for Visual Media and won Best Rock Song. Tron Ares: Divergence, an album containing remixes and previously unreleased tracks, was released on February 27, 2026, featuring contributions by numerous musicians.

== Conception and composition ==
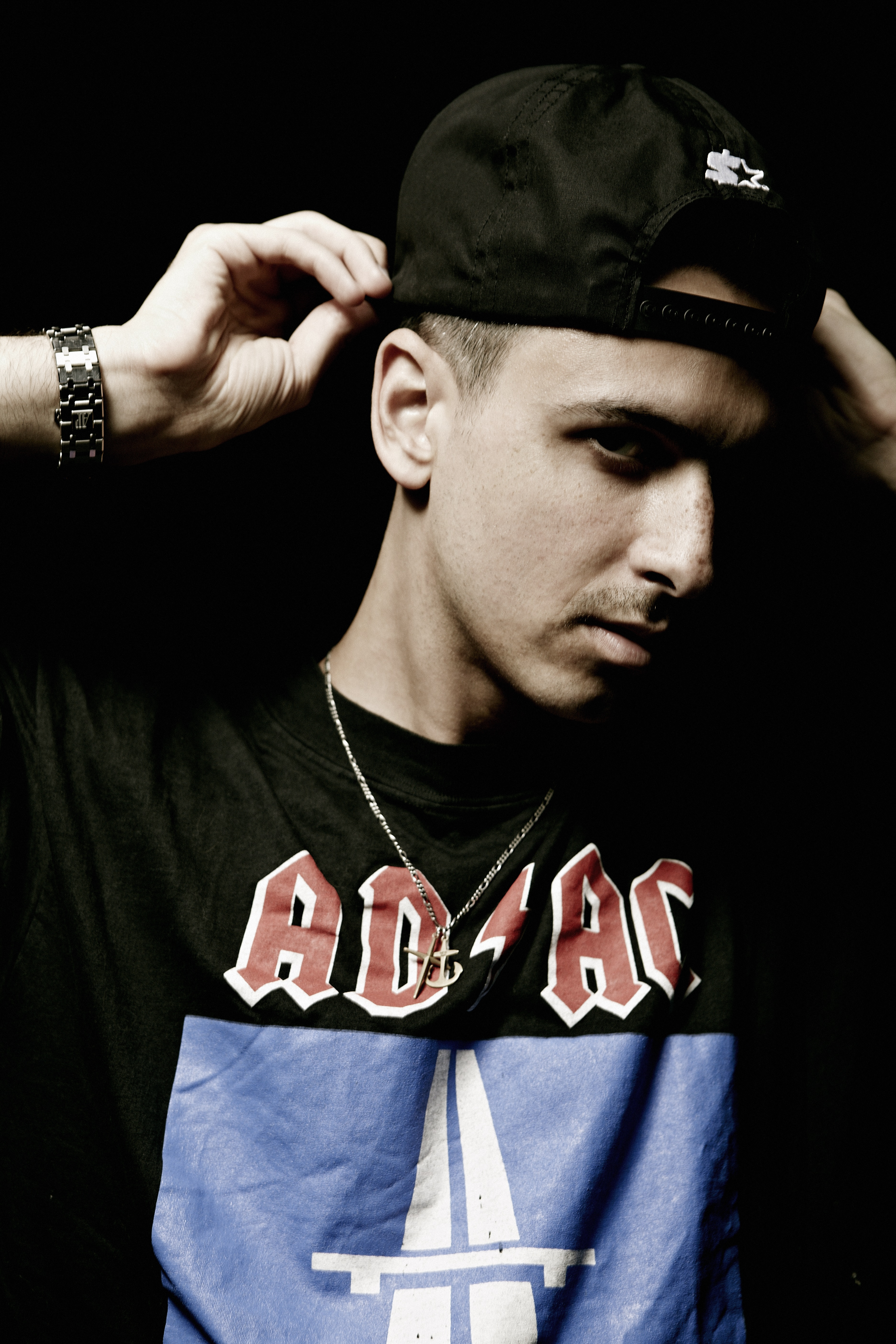
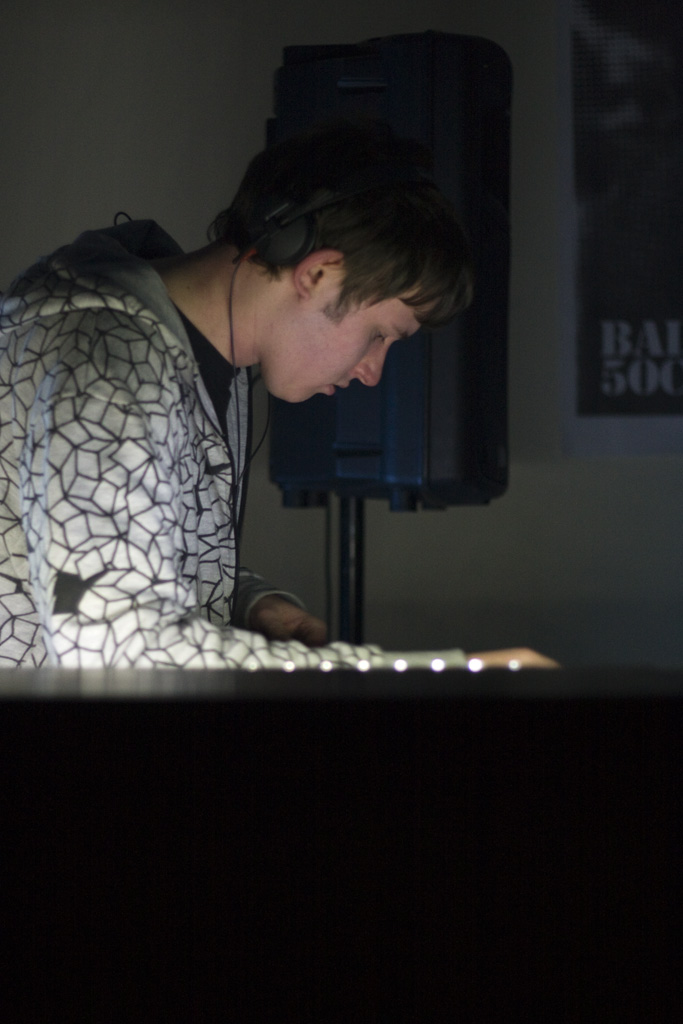
The soundtrack to Tron: Ares features contributions by Boys Noize and Hudson Mohawke.

Trent Reznor and Atticus Ross were chosen to score the third film entry in the Tron franchise, following electronic musician Wendy Carlos's score to Tron (1982) and French house duo Daft Punk's score to Tron: Legacy (2010). Daft Punk had disbanded since scoring Legacy, and at the behest of Ares producer Sean Bailey, Reznor and Ross were approached by Tom MacDougall, president of Walt Disney Music, to work on Tron: Ares shortly after completing work on the soundtrack of the Pixar film Soul (2020). The duo had not before used their band's name for a film score in their repertoire spanning over a dozen films, and Disney's request for them to be credited as their band was unexpected to them.

The soundtrack to Tron: Ares is made up of electronic music, like the music of Wendy Carlos for the original film and Daft Punk for Legacy. Reznor said that he was pressured not only by the expectation of succeeding Carlos and Daft Punk, but also the implications of taking the band name—he quipped that "I wake up at four in the morning slightly more often than I used to, sometimes, getting this film done". While Wendy Carlos and Daft Punk used orchestras for their scores to Tron and Legacy, Reznor and Ross did not utilize "one second" of orchestral music. They described the sound as "precise and unpleasant at times", though not feeling it was "an atonal, punishing" score. With the inclusion of original songs alongside the composed score, Reznor said that a listener could listen to the soundtrack just as they would a conventional Nine Inch Nails album. The record features contributions by Boys Noize, Judeline, and Hudson Mohawke.

== Release ==
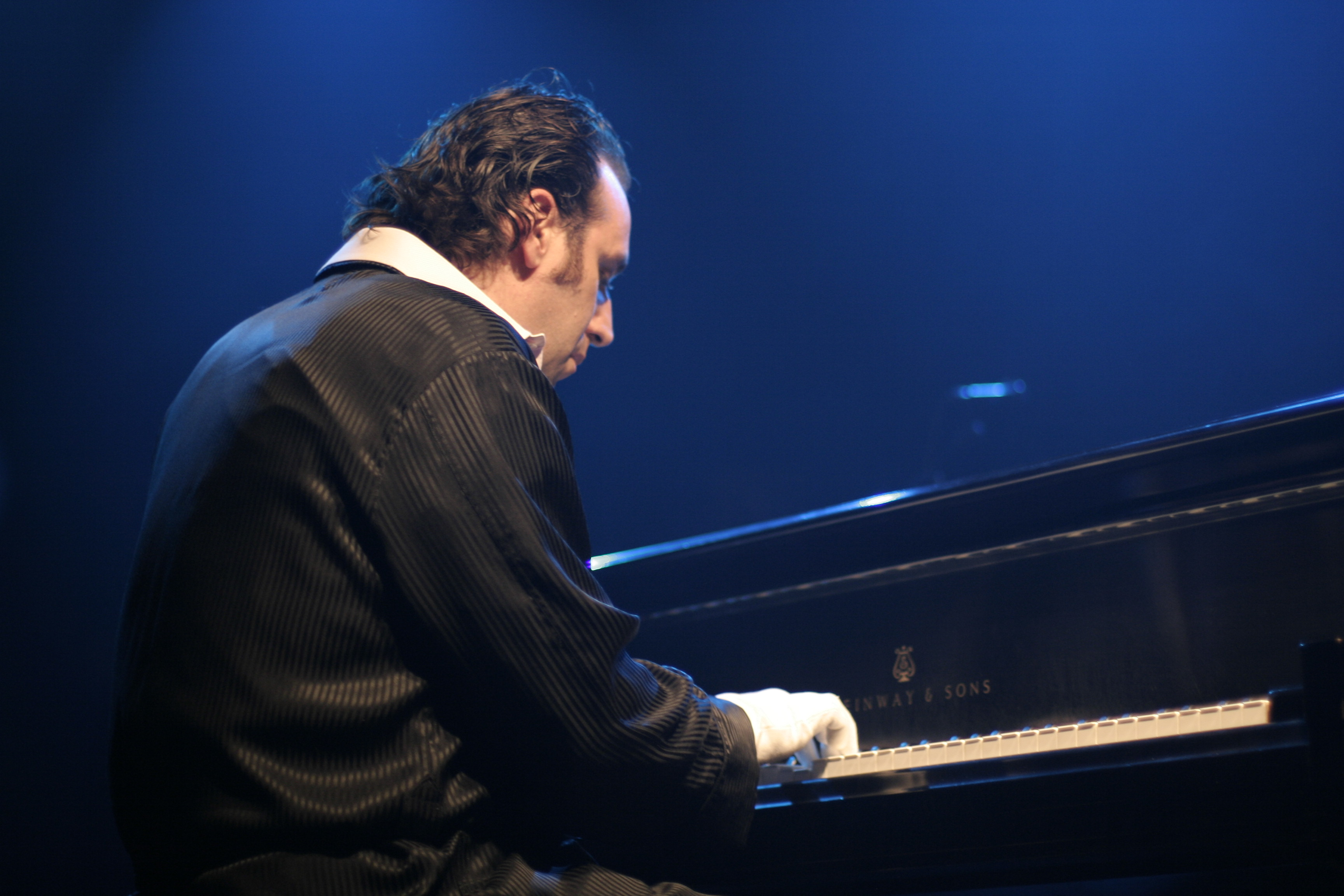
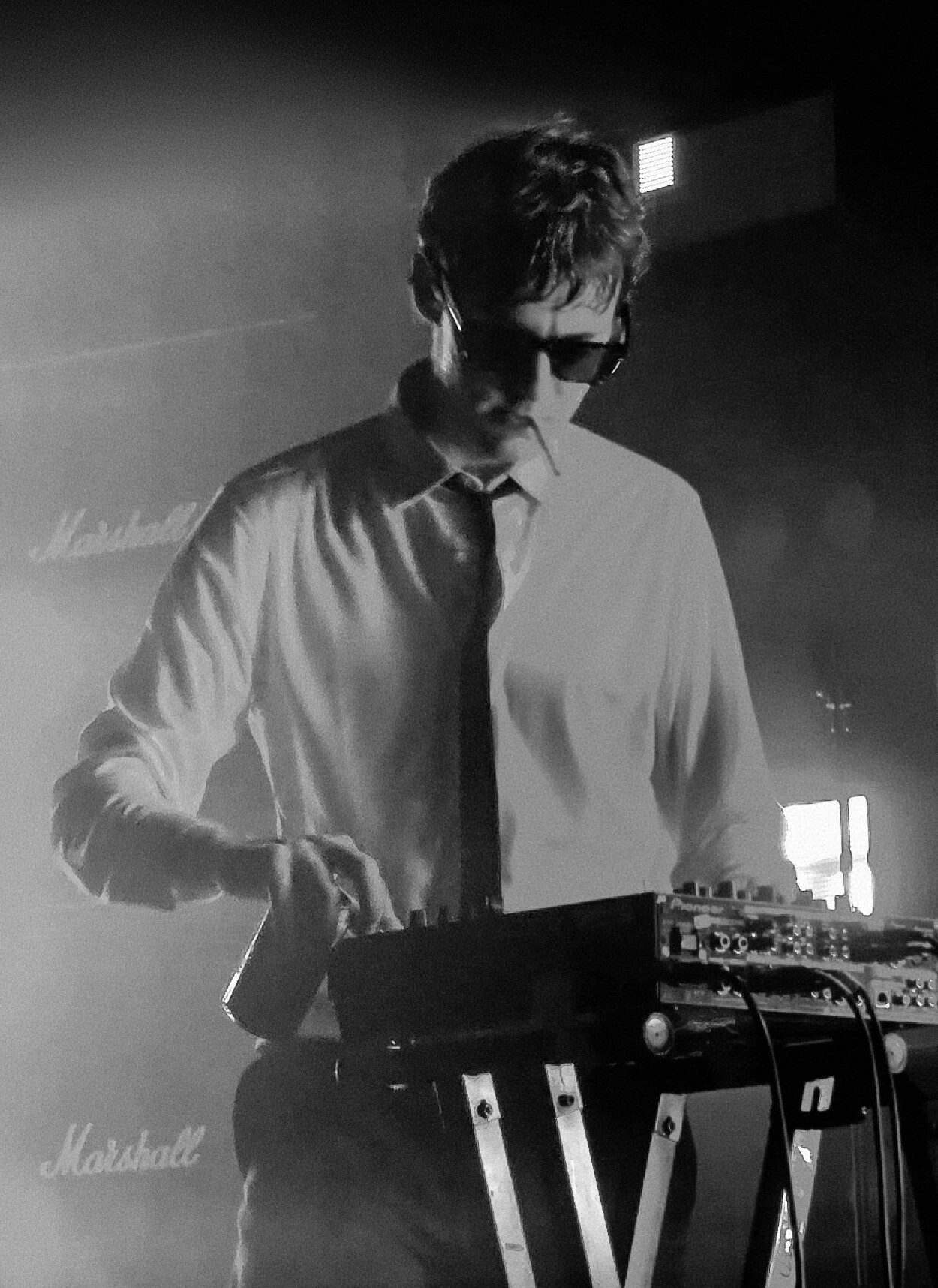
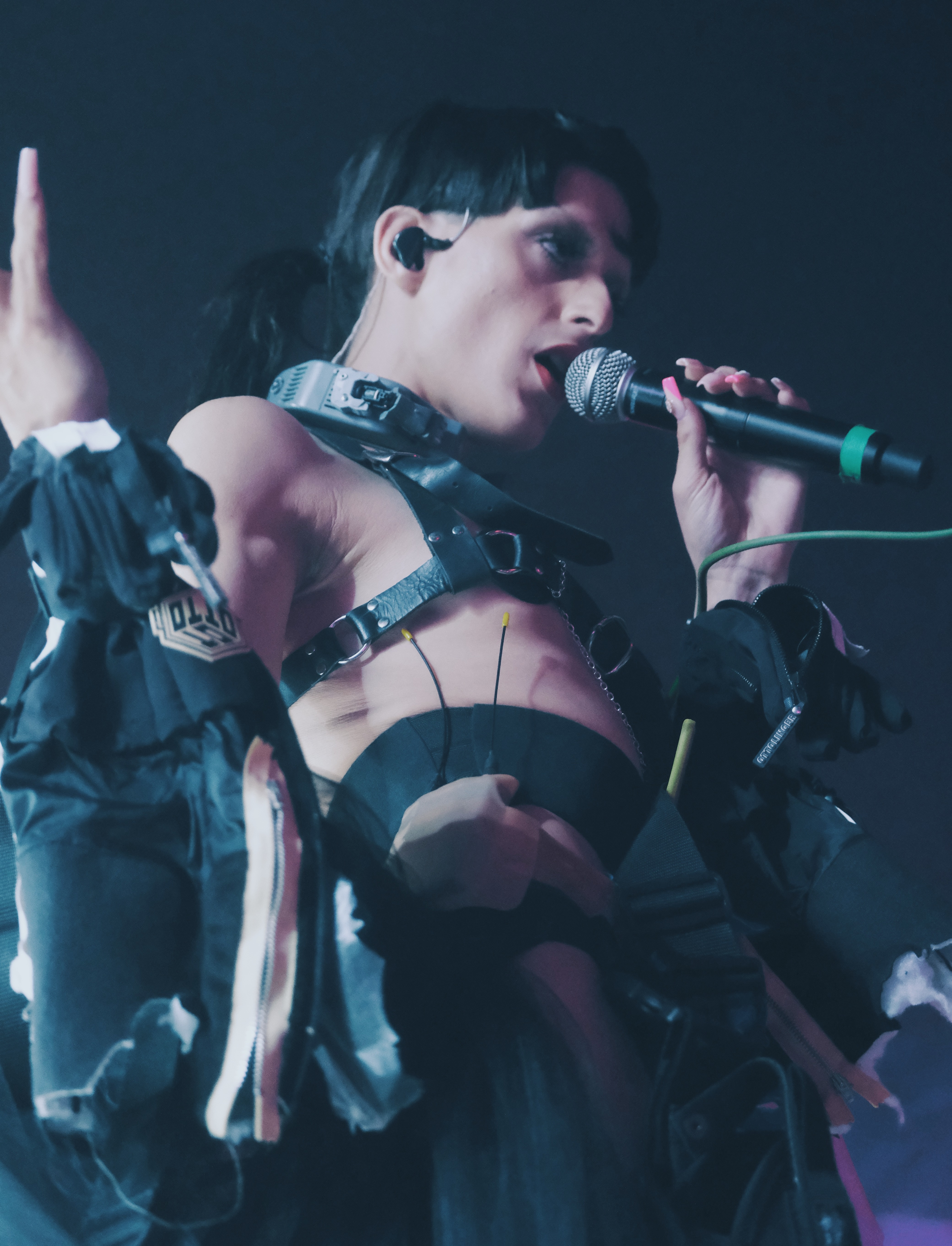
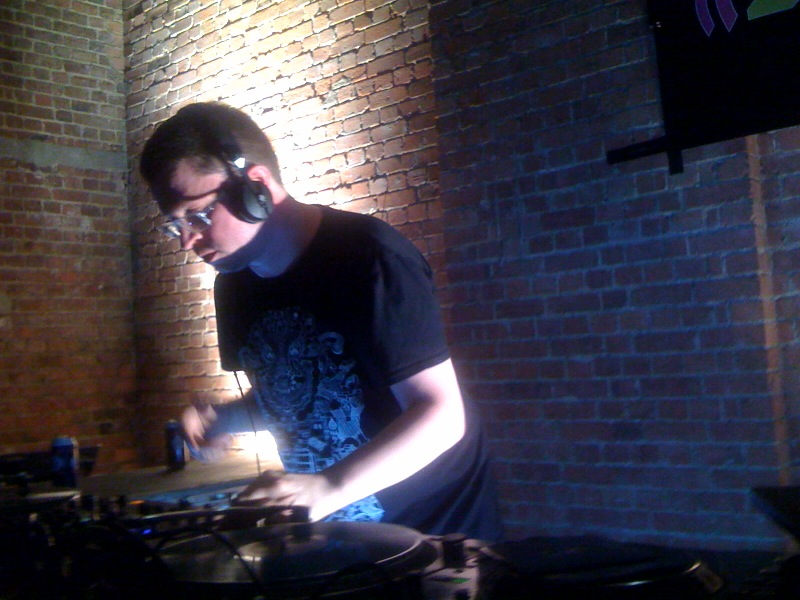
Contributors to the Tron Ares: Divergence remix album included Chilly Gonzales, the Dare, Arca, and Mark Pritchard.

Nine Inch Nails's soundtrack for Tron: Ares was released by The Null Corporation and Walt Disney Records, under exclusive license to Interscope Records on September 19, 2025, consisting of 24 tracks. Polydor Records released the album in the United Kingdom on the same date. It was released as Halo 36 in the band's album numbering system, and as Null 22 according to the duo's film score release system. The single "As Alive as You Need Me to Be" was released on July 17, 2025, after the title was teased on T-shirts sold at the band's Peel It Back Tour. On August 6, the single made its live debut at the first show of the first North American leg of that tour, at the Oakland Arena in California.

From September 15 for a limited time, the Nine Inch Nails score was played on the Tron Lightcycle Run ride at Walt Disney World, stylized with red colors in promotion for Ares. On October 6, Nine Inch Nails and Boys Noize performed a set at the film's TCL Chinese Theatre premiere. Tron Ares: Divergence, an album containing remixes and previously unreleased tracks, was released on February 27, 2026, featuring contributions by Mark Pritchard, Boys Noize, Lanark Artefax, Chilly Gonzales, Danny L Harle, Jack Dangers, Pixel Grip, Working Men's Club, the Dare, Schwefelgelb, and Arca.

== Critical reception ==
Professional ratings
Aggregate scores
Source	Rating
AnyDecentMusic?	6.9/10
Metacritic	81/100
Review scores
Source	Rating
AllMusic	4/5 stars
Consequence	B+
Kerrang!	5/5
Pitchfork	7.4/10
Rolling Stone	3.5/5 stars
Spectrum Culture	70%
Sputnikmusic	3.5/5
Under the Radar	7/10 stars

According to the review aggregator Metacritic, Tron: Ares received "universal acclaim" based on a weighted average score of 81 out of 100 from nine critic scores. The review aggregator site AnyDecentMusic? compiled 6 reviews and gave it an average of 6.9 out of 10. Many critics and publications considered Nine Inch Nails's soundtrack to be a standout aspect amidst a lackluster film. (Note: According to:) At the 68th Annual Grammy Awards in 2026, "As Alive as You Need Me to Be" was nominated for Best Song Written for Visual Media and won Best Rock Song. At the iHeartRadio Music Awards in 2026, the album was nominated for Favorite Soundtrack.

The artistry was the subject of critical commentary. Rolling Stone's Jon Dolan characterized the album as '80s-inspired, synth-based, minimalistic, and industrial rock, inspired by the David Bowie album Low (1977). Dolan said the artistry on songs like "Building Better Worlds" and "Empathetic Trust" reflected the "dystopian creepiness" of the film's premise of AI beings being introduced to humanity for the first time. Sputnikmusic's Raul Stanciu also wrote of the album's 80s influence, commenting on the relative inactivity of the band in recent times—given Reznor and Ross's success in film scores—and the application of the brand to this score. AllMusic's Neil Z. Yeung wrote that the techno-synth sensibilities brought to mind a cybernetically enhanced John Carpenter and followed well from Daft Punk's score, with the themes of desire and tension bringing a humanistic physicality to the album. Kerrang!'s George Garner said that the balance of aggression and tranquility, something common in Nine Inch Nails's work, had been done—in a rare instance—with consistency owing to its context as a film score. Consequence's Liz Shannon Miller framed their appraisal around the legacy of Carlos's and Daft Punk's prior scores, considered key aspects of the franchise; Pitchfork's Sadie Sartini Garner echoed this sentiment, stating that the legacy of the franchise's music applied to this installment. Miller praised the artistic range of the instrumental score tracks, the emotion, and posited that, even if the film faded into general irrelevance like the prior installments, Nine Inch Nails had made a score that would endure just as the priors did.

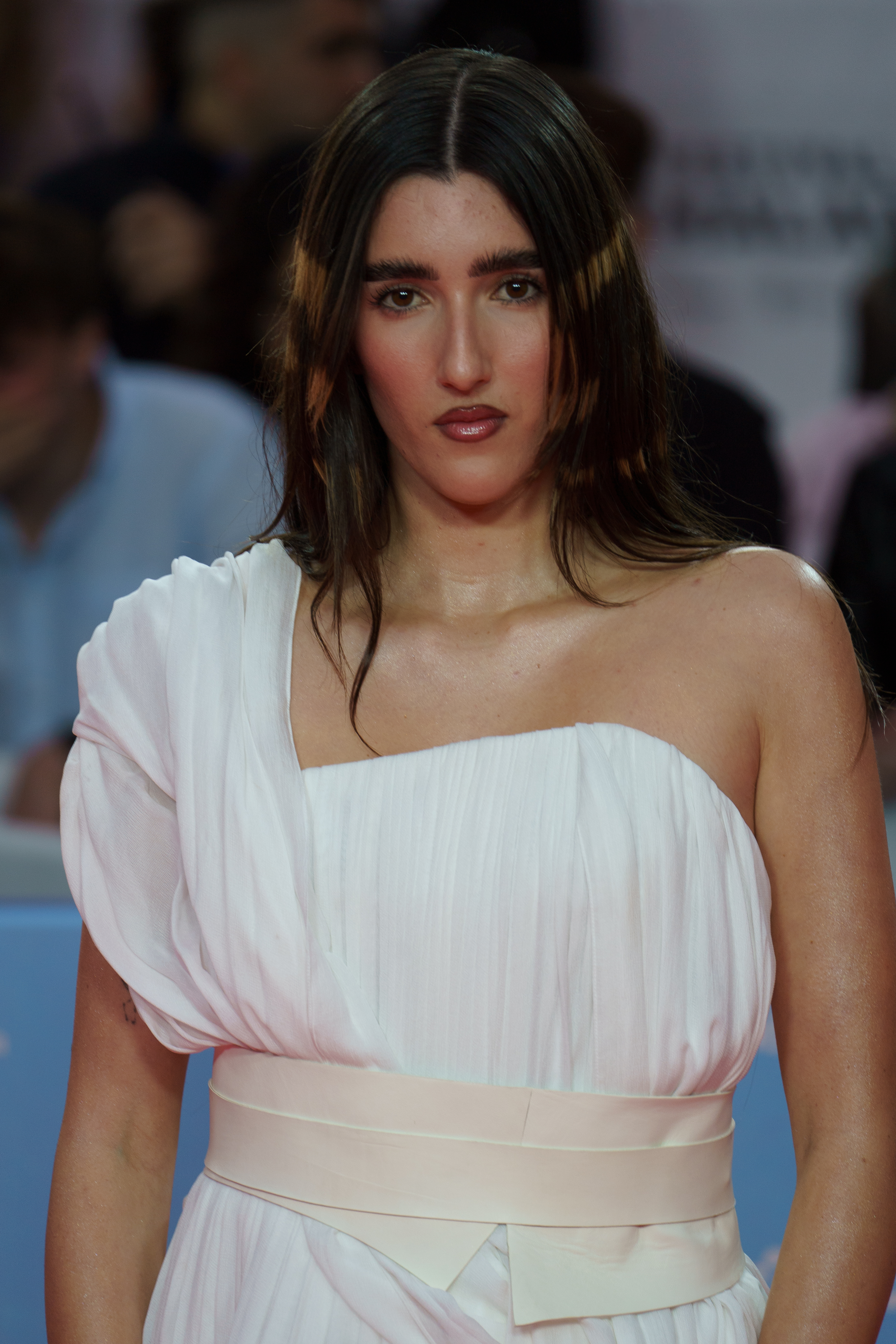
The song "Who Wants to Live Forever?", featuring Spanish singer Judeline (pictured), received praise from reviewers.

Critics commented on the recorded songs for the album. Dolan said "As Alive as You Need Me to Be" was "black gold" akin to old-school works by the band, and wrote highly of the lyrics and artistry; Yeung lauded the lead single as the clear standout and a "jolt" of an addition to other singles in the band's catalogue. Stanciu characterized it as "infectious, dancefloor-ready", and straightforward, a representative summary of the overall goal for the soundtrack. Stereogum's Tom Breihan wrote that the lead single "genuinely kicks ass", and Pitchfork's Garner characterized the vocoder refrain of the repeated "yeahs" as "truly ridiculous". Dolan felt "Who Wants to Live Forever?" was "dejectedly gorgeous" and that Spanish singer Judeline's assist to Reznor's "forlorn moan-croon" was, for Judeline's part, lovely and understated; Yeung wrote Reznor's vulnerability "soars" on "Who Wants to Live Forever?", alongside the harmony with Judeline; Pitchfork's Garner called it "the best" of the four vocal tracks and "among the most affecting and approachable [songs] Reznor has ever written", praising the "tender, quivering duet" Reznor had with Judeline. Kerrang!'s Garner said it was so affecting it could make the listener contemplate their own mortality, finding the track "gorgeous" and Judeline's duet "haunting" and graceful, and Stanciu considered that song a highlight, praising Reznor's tenderness and Judeline's soothing delivery, feeling it was overall lovely and touching. Dolan felt "I Know You Can Feel It" was 90s-inspired grunge and trip-hop; Stanciu agreed with the trip-hop appraisal, feeling it created a thrilling feeling, and Miller speculated on the meaning of the lyrics "The moment it begins" from "I Know You Can Feel It", not knowing what scene it accompanied in the narrative due to the album releasing and being reviewed three weeks before the release of the film—they wrote this was not a standout track.

Critics commented on the instrumental pieces of the score. Dolan wrote that the score was akin to the "beatless abstract bleakness" of the band's albums Ghosts V: Together and Ghosts VI: Locusts (both 2020), with Tron: Ares's droning synths, whirrs, and buzzes akin to the futurism of the score of the 1982 film. They said "Echoes" and "Infiltrator" were some of the best material on the album, and that they were nice twists on the "human hunger and android angst" long present in Reznor's work. Yeung characterized these instrumentals as categorical in either resembling Ghosts or another Reznor-Ross score—or analogous to The Slip (2008) or Hesitation Marks (2013). They pointed out the uses of the motif established in "As Alive as You Need Me to Be" in the dance club vibe of "Infiltrator" and the darkness of "Target Identified". Stanciu wrote that these tracks presented distinct themes or set "atmospheric soundscapes" for the film. Breihan wrote of tracks on the album that brought to mind Carlos's score for the opening scene of A Clockwork Orange (1971), and wrote that they found the "interstitial mood-music" on the record cool. Pitchfork's Garner cited "100% Expendable" as sounding similar to A Clockwork Orange, and Miller likewise wrote that the style of "Building Better Worlds" sounded like the score for the opening scene of that film. Several critics commented on the 5:1 ratio of compositions to vocal songs. Yeung summarized the ratio with "...there are plenty of instrumental moments on Tron: Ares that are just begging for vocals in a more fleshed-out version." Stanciu similarly pointed out the lack of vocals, and suggested that the four songs with vocals would have been suitable as an EP by itself.

== Track listing ==
All tracks are written by Trent Reznor and Atticus Ross

No.	Title	Length
1.	"Init"	2:07
2.	"Forked Reality"	1:50
3.	"As Alive as You Need Me to Be"	3:57
4.	"Echoes"	3:46
5.	"This Changes Everything"	2:59
6.	"In the Image Of"	1:33
7.	"I Know You Can Feel It"	5:21
8.	"Permanence"	1:29
9.	"Infiltrator"	2:47
10.	"100% Expendable"	3:54
11.	"Still Remains"	1:54
12.	"Who Wants to Live Forever?" (featuring Judeline)	5:50
13.	"Building Better Worlds"	2:11
14.	"Target Identified"	3:24
15.	"Daemonize"	5:09
16.	"Empathetic Response"	2:09
17.	"What Have You Done?"	2:14
18.	"A Question of Trust"	1:20
19.	"Ghost in the Machine"	1:29
20.	"No Going Back"	1:55
21.	"Nemesis"	1:45
22.	"New Directive"	2:45
23.	"Out in the World"	1:05
24.	"Shadow Over Me"	3:55
Total length:		66:49

== Personnel ==
Credits adapted from Tidal and the album liner notes.

Nine Inch Nails

- Trent Reznor – production, programming, recording arrangement (all tracks); mixing (tracks 1, 2, 4–6, 8–11, 13–23), vocals (3, 7, 12, 24)
- Atticus Ross – production, programming, recording arrangement (all tracks); mixing (1, 2, 4–6, 8–11, 13–23)

Additional contributors

- Boys Noize – production (3, 24), additional production (1, 2, 4–6, 8–11, 13–23)
- BJ Burton – additional production (3), additional programming (all tracks)
- Hudson Mohawke – production (7), additional production, engineering (3), additional programming (all tracks)
- Ian Kirkpatrick – additional production (3, 24), vocal production (12), additional programming (all tracks)
- Jack Dangers – additional production (7)
- Serban Ghenea – mixing (3, 7, 12, 24)
- Judeline – performer (12; vocals)
- Randy Merrill – mastering
- Idania Valencia – mastering
- Mike Marsh – mastering
- Dustin Mosley – engineering (1, 2, 4–6, 8–11, 13–23)
- Jacob Moreno – engineering (1, 2, 4–6, 8–11, 13–23)
- Bryce Bordone – engineering (3, 7, 12, 24)

== Charts ==
Chart performance for Tron: Ares (Original Motion Picture Soundtrack)
Chart (2025)	Peak position
Australian Albums (ARIA)	10
Austrian Albums (Ö3 Austria)	11
Belgian Albums (Ultratop Flanders)	6
Belgian Albums (Ultratop Wallonia)	6
Canadian Albums (Billboard)	70
Dutch Albums (Album Top 100)	51
French Albums (SNEP)	41
French Rock & Metal Albums (SNEP)	3
German Albums (Offizielle Top 100)	8
Hungarian Physical Albums (MAHASZ)	30
Irish Albums (Official Charts)	34
Japanese Albums (Oricon)	45
Japanese Digital Albums (Oricon)	31
Japanese Download Albums (Billboard Japan)	27
Japanese Top Albums Sales (Billboard Japan)	41
New Zealand Albums (RMNZ)	25
Polish Albums (ZPAV)	13
Scottish Albums (Official Charts)	5
Spanish Albums (PROMUSICAE)	51
Swedish Physical Albums (Sverigetopplistan)	4
Swiss Albums (Schweizer Hitparade)	9
UK Albums (Official Charts)	12
UK Soundtrack Albums (Official Charts)	1
US Billboard 200	5
US Soundtrack Albums (Billboard)	2
US Top Dance Albums (Billboard)	1
US Top Rock & Alternative Albums (Billboard)	1
