= Closer (Nine Inch Nails song) =

1994 single by Nine Inch Nails

- US CD single cover

Single by Nine Inch Nails

from the album The Downward Spiral
- B-side: "March of the Fuckheads"; "Memorabilia"
- Released: May 1994
- Studio: Le Pig, Los Angeles; Record Plant, Los Angeles; A&M, Hollywood
- Genre: Industrial rock; alternative rock
- Length: 6:13 (album version); 6:26 (single version); 4:25 (radio edit)
- Label: Nothing; TVT; Interscope; Atlantic
- Songwriter: Trent Reznor
- Producers: Flood; Trent Reznor

Nine Inch Nails singles chronology
"March of the Pigs" (1994)	"Closer" (1994)	"The Perfect Drug" (1997)

Halo numbers chronology
Halo 8 (1994)	Halo 9 (1994)	Halo 10 (1995)

Audio sample
- "Closer": file; help

Music video
- "Closer" (Director's Cut) on YouTube

"Closer" is a song by American industrial rock band Nine Inch Nails, released as the second single on their second studio album, The Downward Spiral (1994). Released in May 1994, it is considered one of Nine Inch Nails' signature songs. Most versions of the single are titled "Closer to God", a rare example in music of a single's title differing from the title of its A-side ("Closer to God" is also the title of an alternate version of "Closer" featured on the single, which was also released as a separate promotional single for club-play). The single is the ninth official Nine Inch Nails release, making it "Halo 9" in the band's official Halo numbering system.

A promotional single provided by the label to radio stations included both long and short vocal-censored (i.e. silenced profanity) versions. Although the song addresses themes such as self-hatred and obsession, its sexually aggressive chorus led to widespread misinterpretation of the song as an anthem of lust, which helped it become Nine Inch Nails' most successful single up to that time and cemented Trent Reznor's status as an industrial rock icon. Commercially, "Closer" reached No. 41 on the US Billboard Hot 100, No. 25 on the UK Singles Chart, and No. 3 on the Australian Singles Chart. Censored versions of the song and its Mark Romanek-directed music video received substantial airplay on radio and MTV.

== Composition ==
"Closer" has been described as industrial rock and alternative rock. "Closer" uses elements of funk, avant-garde, and electronic music. The drum track of "Closer" is built around a heavily modified sample of the bass drum from the 1977 Iggy Pop song "Nightclubbing", which was performed by a Roland drum machine. The samples were produced using two Akai S1100 samplers, each with an expander, essentially making up four samplers. The samples were then combined with beats produced by a Roland R-70 drum machine. The production features sound effects such as a bass squelch, synth echo, and feedback growl. A manipulated sample of Roxy Music's "Take a Chance with Me" can be heard at the close of the song. Radio edits of "Closer" were created by muting the vocal track for the duration of each deleted obscenity.

Lyrically, "Closer" is a song about self-hatred and obsession; to Reznor's dismay, the song was widely misinterpreted as a lust anthem due to its chorus, which famously includes the lines "I wanna fuck you like an animal / I wanna feel you from the inside". In 2003, VH1 ranked the song at No. 93 in its countdown of the "100 Greatest Songs of the Past 25 Years." The song was ranked at No. 2 on AOL's "69 Sexiest Songs of All Time" due to the explicit frankness of the chorus. Mötley Crüe drummer Tommy Lee, said of the song, "Come on dude: 'I wanna fuck you like an animal'? That's the all-time fuck song. Those are pure fuck beats—Trent Reznor knew what he was doing. You can fuck to it, you can dance to it and you can break shit to it."

There were numerous remixes of "Closer". The version titled "Closer to God" was heavily reworked, as the vocals were completely re-recorded and the overall song retained only a few elements from the original version. "Closer to God" was also released as a promotional single separate from "Closer", mainly intended for club play.

== Reception ==
"Closer" had some radio airplay before it was released as a single. This factor increased within weeks, leading Interscope to release the song as a single in May 1994. When it premiered, the single charted on several US Billboard magazine music listings. Debuting near the bottom spot of the Billboard Hot 100, it barely missed the top 40, peaking at No. 41. It climbed to No. 11 on the Billboard Modern Rock Tracks chart, and also went on to reach No. 35 on the Billboard Album Rock Tracks chart and No. 29 on the Billboard Hot Dance Music/Maxi-Singles Sales chart. "Closer" was the band's first crossover hit and remains their most popular song to date.

The single was successful in several other countries as well. It charted the highest in Australia, where it rose to No. 3 on the week of November 13, 1994, and was the country's 87th most successful single of 1994. Although "Closer" did not initially appear on Canada's official music chart during its original release, it reached a peak of No. 5 on the Canadian Singles Chart in February 2002. It also did not chart in Denmark until 2007, when it reached No. 12 in July. In the United Kingdom, the single reached No. 25.

The aforementioned "Closer to God" version of the song charted at No. 29 on the Billboard Dance Music/Club Play Singles.

It ranked No. 42 on Pitchfork Media's "Top 200 Tracks of the 90s" in 2010. In 2021, it was listed at No. 270 on Rolling Stone's "500 Greatest Songs of All Time". In 2020, Kerrang! and Billboard ranked the song number five and number one, respectively, on their lists of the greatest Nine Inch Nails songs.

== Music video ==
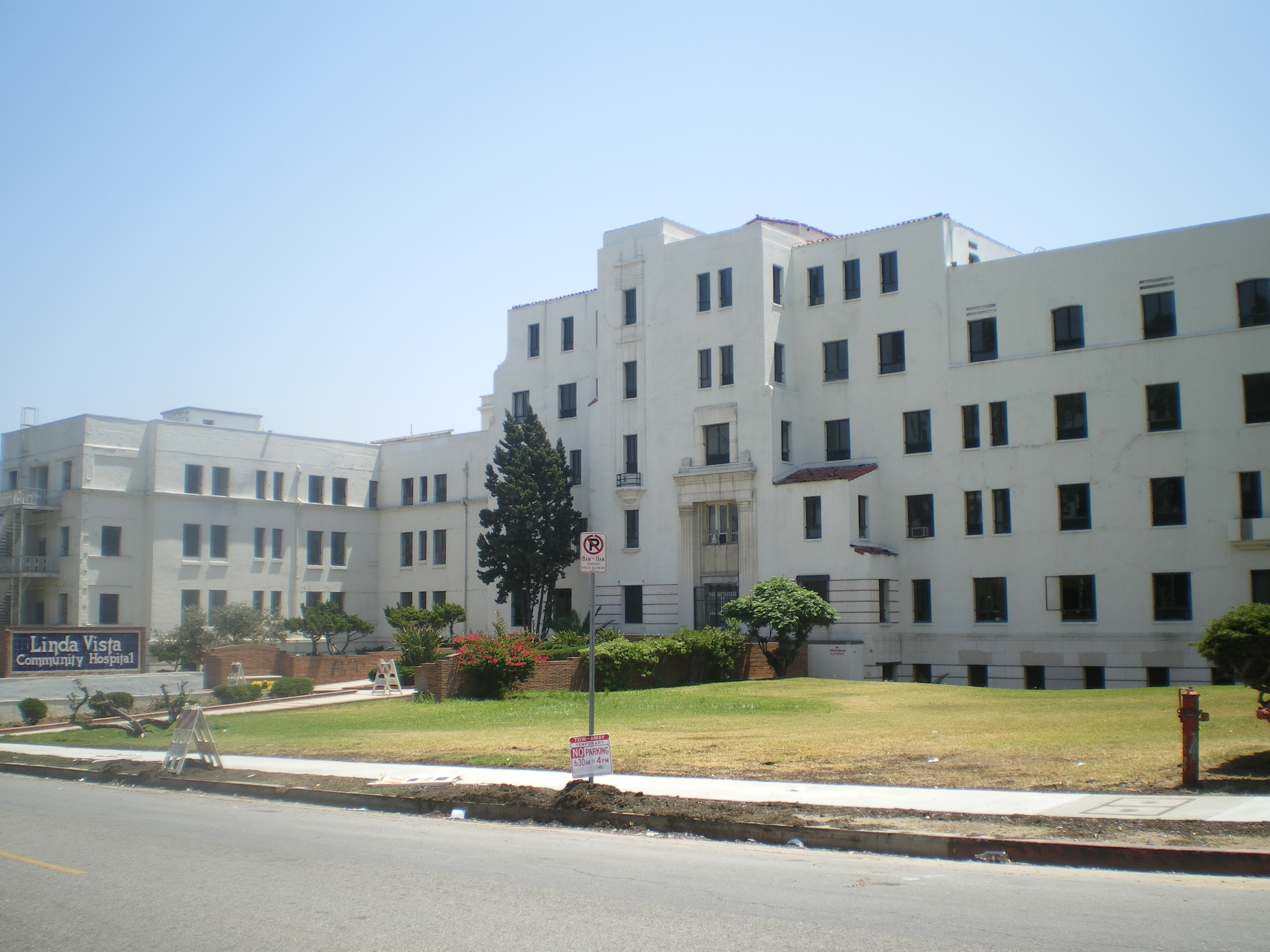
Linda Vista Hospital in Los Angeles, where sections of the video were filmed

The music video was directed by Mark Romanek and first aired on May 12, 1994, having been filmed in April of that year. It was cut down from its original length to 4:36. Several sections of the video were shot inside the then-abandoned Linda Vista Community Hospital in Los Angeles. The video was popular and helped bolster the success of the band. Set in what appears to be a 19th-century mad scientist's laboratory, the video's imagery involves religion, sexuality, animal cruelty, politics, and terror, including a heart connected to some sort of device; the beat of the heart corresponds to the beat of the song, a little girl lounging on a chair; a nude, bald woman with a crucifix mask; a monkey, scared, panicked, tied to a cross with a picture of Jack Nicholson (photograph taken by David Bailey) on the right. a severed pig's head spinning on some type of machine, a diagram of the vulva/vagina, Reznor wearing various fetish gear, such as an S&M mask, ball gag, and long leather gloves while swinging in shackles and shots of various insects, representing decomposition of society through food. Several times, Reznor, wearing leather pants, floats and rotates through the air, suspended by invisible wires. There are also scenes of Reznor being blown back by a wind machine while wearing aviator goggles. Romanek has stated:

We made prints, and I personally spent a couple of days dragging them around the parking lot and spraying aerosol shellac and holding lighters under them. We were just making it for art's sake, and YouTube didn't exist then, so it was a pretty ballsy and extravagant thing for Trent to do. But MTV liked it, so that started a long negotiation of how we can get it on the air. I want to go on record about the monkey: That monkey was not in any danger even though he appears to be in distress. The monkey was just munching on bits of banana and enjoying himself. We had an ASPCA person on the set. It wasn't harmed, and actually got paid more than some of the crew.

These images were inspired by the work of Joel-Peter Witkin, as well as by the Brothers Quay's animated short film Street of Crocodiles. Other artworks visually referenced in the video include Man Ray's Object to Be Destroyed, Francis Bacon's Figure with Meat, and photos by James Van Der Zee. For the television version, certain removed scenes were replaced with a title card that read "Scene Missing," and the instances of the word fuck being edited out were accompanied by a stop in the video motion, making it appear as if the stop was a result of defective film (this was supposedly done to make sure the flow of the song was not affected). According to Romanek, the video was filmed using "a slightly out of date film stock but it was still a contemporary film stock." Ash Beck created the levitating visual effects, integrated film distress and "Scene Missing" cards which enhanced the mystery of the edited out scenes.

They had stopped making it three years before and we found some of it. All the new color film stocks have this T-Grain, like little Ts that are interlocking. The film stock we used had the original old granular grain. The new stocks are just really modern looking, really sharp, really contrasty, very fine grain. We didn't want that. Normally you don't want to use that kind of stock because the colors will be off. It does have a shelf life but in this case we didn't care, the more fucked up it was the happier we were.

The unedited version of the video was shown on Playboy TV's music video show Hot Rocks in 1994. In mid-2002, the unedited version aired on MTV2 as part of a special countdown showcasing the most controversial videos ever to air on MTV. This countdown was only shown late at night due to the sexually explicit imagery of "Closer" and several other videos.

In 2006, "Closer" was voted No. 1 in a VH1 Classic poll, "20 Greatest Music Videos of All Time."

In retrospect, Reznor said of the video that "The rarest of things occurred: where the song sounded better to me, seeing it with the video. And it's my song."

The unedited video is included in Closure, The Downward Spiral (DualDisc), Directors Label Volume 4: The Work Of Director Mark Romanek and Vevo, and it is available for download from the United States iTunes Store under the band's page. Behind-the-scenes footage with commentary by Romanek is included in Closure (DVD) and Directors Label. It is also available on YouTube, and was previously flagged there before this restriction was lifted.

== Live performances ==
During the Self Destruct and Fragility tours, bassist Danny Lohner and guitarist Robin Finck joined Reznor and full-time keyboardists James Woolley (during the first half of the Self Destruct Tour) and Charlie Clouser (during the remaining tours) on keyboards for the song, with Reznor performing an extended synth solo. Nine Inch Nails performed the "Closer to God" rendition of the song live during their 1995 tour on numerous occasions, omitting the original song from the setlist when done so.

There are performance videos of "Closer" on And All that Could Have Been and Beside You in Time.

In the tours following the release of With Teeth, Nine Inch Nails performed a shorter version of "Closer" with the keyboard solo played as a guitar solo and a breakdown incorporating a portion of "The Only Time," a track from Pretty Hate Machine. Two performances of this version of the song appear on Beside You in Time.

A remixed version of the song has been performed during certain dates of their 2025-2026 Peel It Back Tour alongside their supporting act Boys Noize, featuring a more electronic inspired backing beat and percussion.

== Formats and track listings ==
The version of "Closer" on the single is 13 seconds longer than the album version; on the album, the piano tune at the end of the song is abruptly cut off in order to segue into the next track, "Ruiner". On the single, the piano and background sounds of "Closer" are allowed to play out longer.

In addition, the U.S. CD single contains five guest remixes of "Closer", a remix of its fellow The Downward Spiral track "Heresy", an instrumental track "March of the Fuckheads" (unrelated to "March of the Pigs"), and a cover version of Soft Cell's song "Memorabilia", from their 1982 EP Non Stop Ecstatic Dancing. The UK single releases contain the same tracks split between two discs (each sold separately). A cassette single was issued in the U.S. and Australia, pairing "Closer" with the music video version of Nine Inch Nails' previous single, "March of the Pigs" (which was recorded live in the studio by the then-current lineup of the band).

The single's cover artwork was done by photographer Joseph Cultice.

US CD

- TVT Records / Interscope Records / Atlantic Records 95905–2
- TVT Records / Interscope Records 0694959052 (Reissue)

No.	Title	Remixers / contributors	Length
1.	"Closer to God"	Trent Reznor; Sean Beavan; Brian Pollack	5:05
2.	"Closer (Precursor)"	Coil; Danny Hyde	7:16
3.	"Closer (Deviation)"	Jack Dangers; Craig Silvey	6:15
4.	"Heresy (Blind)"	Dave Ogilvie; Anthony Valcic; Joseph Bishara (misspelled as "Bisara")	5:32
5.	"Memorabilia"	Reznor; Robin Finck; Beavan; Chris Vrenna; Pollack; John van Eaton; “Sugar and his friend”	7:21
6.	"Closer (Internal)"	Bill Kennedy; Scott Humphrey; John "Geetus" Aguto; Paul Decarli; Eric Claudiex	4:15
7.	"March of the Fuckheads"	Adrian Sherwood	4:43
8.	"Closer (Further Away)"	Kennedy; Humphrey; Aguto; Decarli; Claudiex	5:45
9.	"Closer"	Reznor; Flood	6:26

US cassette

- Nothing Records / TVT Records / Interscope Records / Atlantic Records 98263-4

Side A
No.	Title	Contributors	Length
1.	"Closer"	Reznor; Flood	6:25

Side B
No.	Title	Contributors	Length
2.	"March of the Pigs (live)"	Reznor; Finck; Vrenna; Danny Lohner; James Woolley	3:12

UK CD

- Island Records CID 596 854 059–2 (Disc 1)
- Island Records CIDX 596 854 061–2 (Disc 2)

Disc 1: Further Away
No.	Title	Length
1.	"Closer"	6:26
2.	"Closer (Deviation)"	6:15
3.	"Closer (Further Away)"	5:45
4.	"Closer (Precursor)"	7:16
5.	"Closer (Internal)"	4:15

Disc 2: Closer to God
No.	Title	Length
1.	"Closer to God"	5:05
2.	"Heresy (Blind)"	5:32
3.	"Memorabilia"	7:21
4.	"March of the Fuckheads"	4:43

U.K. 12-inch vinyl – Part 1: Further Away

- Island Records 12IS 596 854 059–1 – UK 12-inch vinyl 1

Side A
No.	Title	Length
1.	"Closer (Deviation)"
2.	"Closer (Further Away)"
3.	"Closer"

Side B
No.	Title	Length
4.	"Closer (Precursor)"
5.	"Closer (Internal)"

UK 12-inch vinyl – Part 2: Closer to God

- Island Records 12ISX 596 854 061–1 – UK 12-inch vinyl 2

Side A
No.	Title	Length
1.	"Closer to God"
2.	"March of the Fuckheads"

Side B
No.	Title	Length
3.	"Heresy (Blind)"
4.	"Memorabilia"

Other versions in other formats and countries have the same track listing as the U.S. CD release.

== Personnel ==
- Trent Reznor – lead and backing vocals, guitar, bass guitar, keyboards, synthesizers, programming, sampling
- Flood – special hi-hat programming

== Charts ==
=== Weekly charts ===
1994–1995 weekly chart performance for "Closer"
Chart (1994–1995)	Peak position
Australia (ARIA)	3
Scottish Singles Sales (Official Charts)	76
UK Singles (Official Charts)	25
US Billboard Hot 100	41
US Alternative Airplay (Billboard)	11
US Dance Club Songs (Billboard) "Closer to God"	29
US Dance Singles Sales (Billboard)	29
US Mainstream Rock (Billboard)	35
US Cash Box Top 100	47

2000 weekly chart performance for "Closer"
Chart (2000)	Peak position
Canada (Nielsen SoundScan)	7

2002 weekly chart performance for "Closer"
Chart (2002)	Peak position
Canada (Nielsen SoundScan)	5

2007 year-end chart performance for "Closer"
Chart (2007)	Peak position
Denmark (Tracklisten)	12

2012 weekly chart performance for "Closer"
Chart (2012)	Peak position
Canada Digital Song Sales (Billboard)	45

=== Year-end charts ===
1994 year-end chart performance for "Closer"
Chart (1994)	Position
Australia (ARIA)	87
US Modern Rock Tracks (Billboard)	12

2001 year-end chart performance for "Closer"
Chart (2001)	Position
Canada (Nielsen SoundScan)	17

2002 year-end chart performance for "Closer"
Chart (2002)	Position
Canada (Nielsen SoundScan)	30

== Certifications ==
Certifications for "Closer"
Region	Certification	Certified units/sales
Australia (ARIA)	Gold	35,000^{^}
New Zealand (RMNZ)	Platinum	30,000^{‡}
United Kingdom (BPI)	Gold	400,000^{‡}
^{^} Shipments figures based on certification alone.^{‡} Sales+streaming figures based on certification alone.

== Release history ==
Release dates and formats for "Closer"
Region	Date	Format(s)	Label(s)	Ref.
United States	May 30, 1994	CD; cassette	Nothing; TVT; Interscope; Atlantic	
United Kingdom	June 6, 1994	12-inch vinyl; CD	Island; TVT	

== Cover versions ==
- "Closer" has been covered by many musical acts, including Blood on the Dance Floor, Richard Cheese and Lounge Against the Machine, Eric Gorfain, Maroon 5, Maxwell, The Asylum Street Spankers, Asking Alexandria, Rosetta Stone, In This Moment, Japanese Voyeurs and Palaye Royale.
- Thirty Seconds to Mars uses samples from "Closer" when they perform "The Fantasy".
- "Weird Al" Yankovic has paid tribute to "Closer" twice: in "The Alternative Polka" on his album Bad Hair Day, a section of the song was used in which the word "fuck" is replaced with a cartoon sound effect. "Germs" on his Running with Scissors album is a style parody of several Nine Inch Nails songs.
- The Asylum Street Spankers occasionally perform a bluegrass version, available at the Live Music Archive.
- In 1995, the Australian novelty act Nine Inch Richards covered the song under the title "Closer to Hogs". Sung in a southern drawl, it combined Trent Reznor's sexually charged lyrics with barnyard animal samples, humorously implying that the song is about bestiality. A video clip of the parody was taken at the Sydney Royal Easter Show. This single peaked at No. 51 in Australia.
- In 2008, Sy Smith performed the song as part of her "Conflict Tour". In August 2010, Smith performed the song again at "Baldwin Hills Crenshaw Heights Plaza".
- In 2014, from the compilation album in the Punk Goes 90's 2 has been covered by British rock band Asking Alexandria.
- In 2016, singer-songwriter Father John Misty covered the song live in Chicago during two separate performances.
- Fellow Interscope act Limp Bizkit parodied "Closer" (as well "The Perfect Drug" and "Burn") in their song "Hot Dog". The chorus goes, "You wanna fuck me like an animal, You'd like to burn me on the inside, You like to think that I'm a perfect drug, Just know that nothing you do will bring you closer to me." Limp Bizkit frontman Fred Durst said he was a big fan of Nine Inch Nails, who has additionally inspired his music.
- Jazz and bebop singer Veronica Swift performs a cover version of Closer in her 2023 Veronica Swift album.

== Bibliography ==
- Huxley, Martin (September 1997). Nine Inch Nails: Self Destruct. St. Martin's Press. ISBN 0-312-15612-X – via the Internet Archive.
- Vernallis, Carol (2004). Experiencing Music Video: Aesthetics and Cultural Context. New York: Columbia University Press. ISBN 0-231-11798-1.
