= Peel It Back Tour =

2025–2026 concert tour by Nine Inch Nails

Peel It Back
- Tour by Nine Inch Nails
- Official event poster
- Location: Europe; North America
- Start date: June 15, 2025
- End date: March 16, 2026
- No. of shows: 63
- Supporting act: Boys Noize
- Attendance: 450,000+ (2025)
- Website: nin.com

Nine Inch Nails concert chronology
- NIN 2022 (2022); Peel It Back (2025–2026)

The Peel It Back Tour was a concert tour by the American industrial rock band Nine Inch Nails, consisting of Trent Reznor and Atticus Ross, who had started out with touring members Robin Finck, Alessandro Cortini and Ilan Rubin. Josh Freese took over for Rubin at the start of the first North American leg, and Stu Brooks took over for Cortini at the start of the second North American leg. Boys Noize was the opening act for every show on the tour. The tour, consisting of 63 shows in three legs across Europe and North America, started in Dublin, Ireland on June 15, 2025, and finished in Sacramento, United States on March 16, 2026. It was preceded by the band's US and UK shows in 2022.

After Reznor and Ross had focused on composing film scores, they made plans to put their creative inspiration into new Nine Inch Nails work. A new Nine Inch Nails project was expected since December 2024, and leaks regarding concert dates began in mid-January 2025 until the band confirmed the tour, but the announcement was delayed due to the ongoing Los Angeles wildfires. They later confirmed dates for the Peel It Back Tour, with a European leg running from June through July and a North American leg from August through September. In October, they announced an extension adding additional North American shows scheduled for February and March 2026.

From their discography, the band played both their main hits and deep cuts, and shows were split between a main and B-stage. The concert's staging displayed visuals of rain, moving silhouettes, and dramatic curtain drops, with recording done by way of hand-held cinematography, and using displays 3D projected onto translucent fabric. The tour saw many of the band's songs played for the first time in years, several live debuts, and cover songs. The Peel It Back Tour received critical acclaim, gaining praise for its lighting and production, energetic performances, and Freese's return. It was among the biggest concert tours in 2025, attracting over 450,000 concertgoers during that year's shows.

== Background and events ==
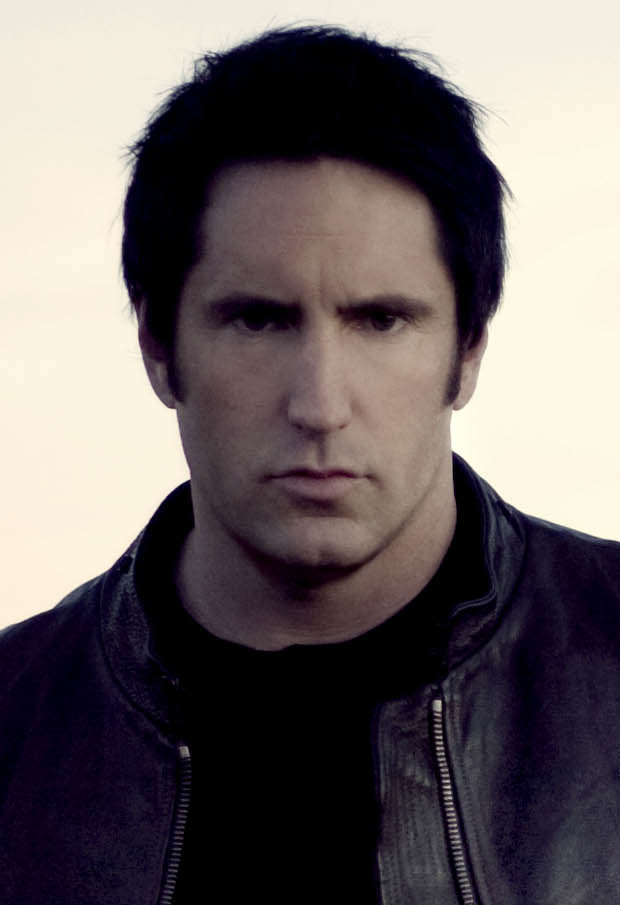
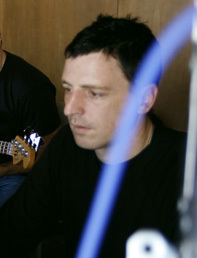
Trent Reznor (left) and Atticus Ross began the Peel It Back Tour after a period of time focusing mainly on film scores

In April 2024, Nine Inch Nails announced numerous upcoming projects through new multimedia company With Teeth, including a music festival, a new album, short film, and video game. In August, they announced that the band would compose the score to Disney's Tron: Ares (2025), the first of Trent Reznor and Atticus Ross's film scores to credit the Nine Inch Nails name after over a dozen prior works. After having been focused more on film scores, Reznor indicated in December 2024 that he and Ross were "taking the inspiration we've garnered and funneling it into a Nine Inch Nails project", and that the duo was ready to return to the "driver's seat". Reznor elaborated that material released by "Nine Inch Nails" had been their work in relation to the zeitgeist, which he felt less connected to as he aged, but said that this purpose was changing, and that beyond the Tron score he mused that other Nine Inch Nails activity in 2025 was not out of the question. Plans for a tour titled "Peel It Back" leaked on January 13, 2025, the title alluding to the band's song "March of the Pigs" from The Downward Spiral (1994). These leaks indicated August and September shows in the United States, Canada, and Europe; a September 10 date at Benchmark International Arena in Tampa, Florida suggested that tickets were going on sale starting January 17. The leaks included an associated Ticketmaster listing for the Tampa date, with numerous concert locations in America emerging online, as well as in Toronto, Canada and Manchester, England.

On January 14, the band confirmed they would be touring and provide further details in due time, but had delayed their announcement due to the ongoing Los Angeles wildfires. The Peel It Back Tour marks the band's first tour since the completion of their 2022 US and UK shows. Dates for a North American leg were indicated by the online leaks with shows in Brooklyn, Tampa, Atlanta, Raleigh, Philadelphia, Toronto, and Cleveland; as well dates for a Europe leg with shows in Manchester and London. On January 22, 2025, Nine Inch Nails announced the tour dates, with a European leg starting in June in Dublin and ending in July; and a North American leg starting in August and ending in September in Los Angeles. The dates included arena shows and stops at European music festivals. Three more shows were added to the tour on January 29. On March 5, Nine Inch Nails announced that Boys Noize, who completed the Challengers (Mixed) remix album for their 2024 score of the film Challengers, would open for the band on every show of the Peel It Back Tour. The show in Lyon was canceled by June 13. At the June 15 opening show in Ireland, the band debuted with their full lineup; Robin Finck served as guitarist, Alessandro Cortini as bassist / keyboardist, and Ilan Rubin served as drummer.

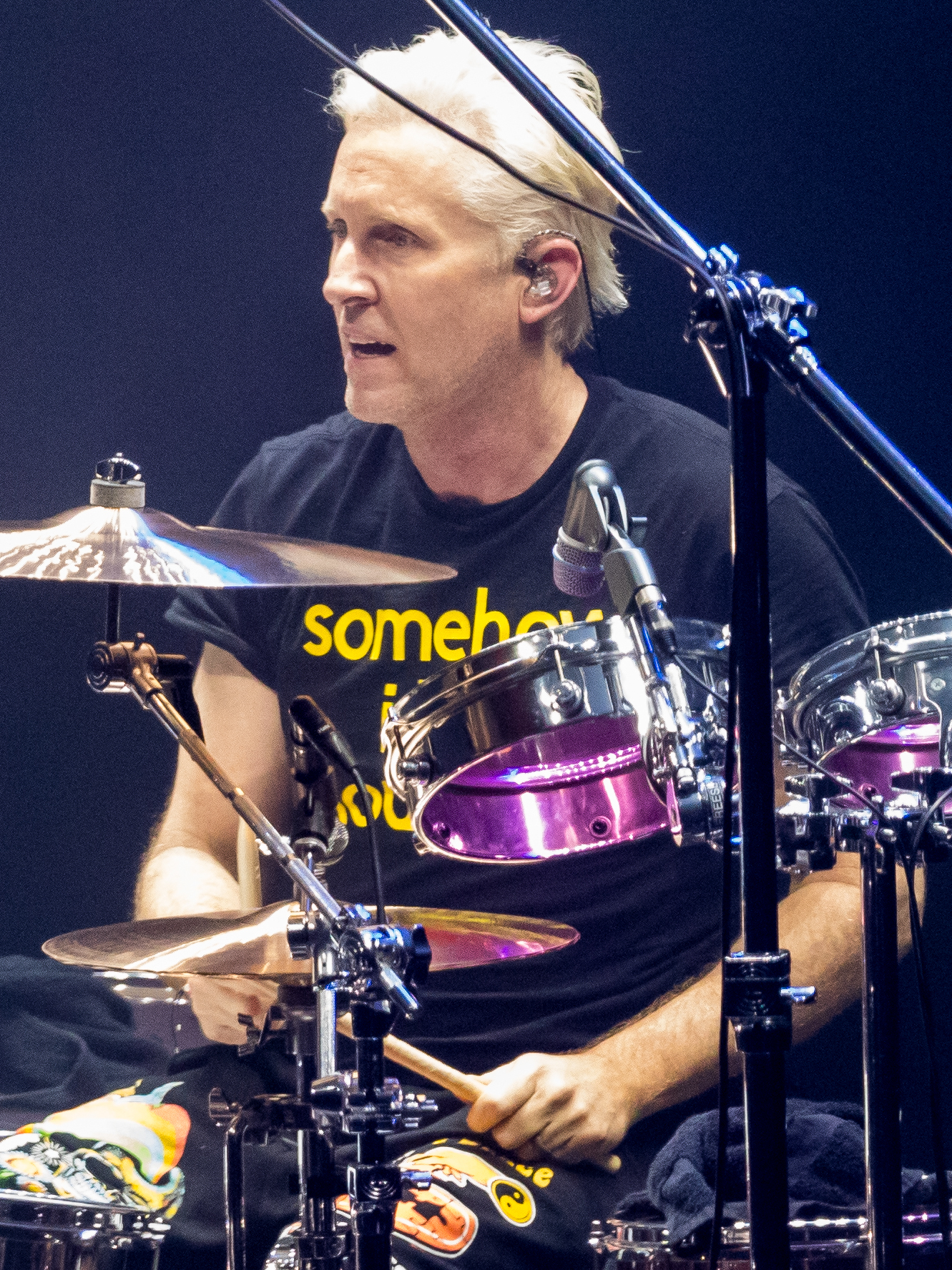
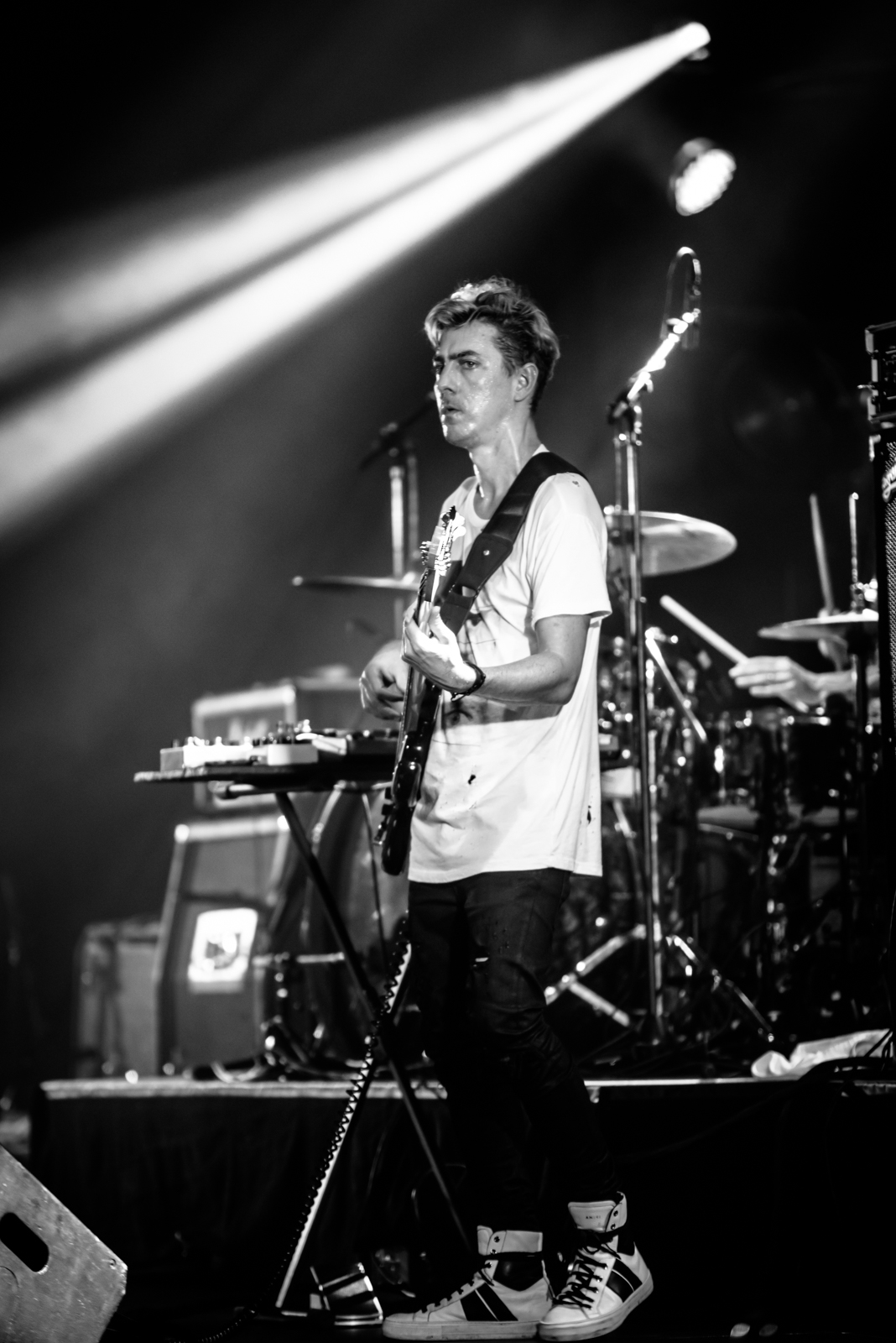
Josh Freese (left) and Stu Brooks joined the tour in the first and second North American legs

Rubin would depart from the band after the European leg to join the Foo Fighters, being replaced by past member Josh Freese starting with the North American leg, who himself had been fired from the Foo Fighters a few months before. Reznor said at the first show of the North American leg that Freese had rehearsed for the Peel It Back Tour for only one day, as opposed to the months of practice the other members had beforehand. On October 1, 2025, the band announced the tour would be extended into 2026 with 22 additional North American dates, starting in February in New Orleans and ending in March in Sacramento. Stu Brooks replaced Cortini at the start of this leg. He primarily played bass, while also doing guitar, synthesizer, and piano parts. To prepare, Brooks practiced with longtime band member Finck for several weeks, which Brooks said helped him "come a long way" with understanding the material. Brooks previously played alongside Freese in Danny Elfman's live band. Reznor said at the February 27, 2026 show in Tulsa, Oklahoma that he did not know if the band would continue touring after Peel It Back, though expressed his content with this tour.

== Performances ==
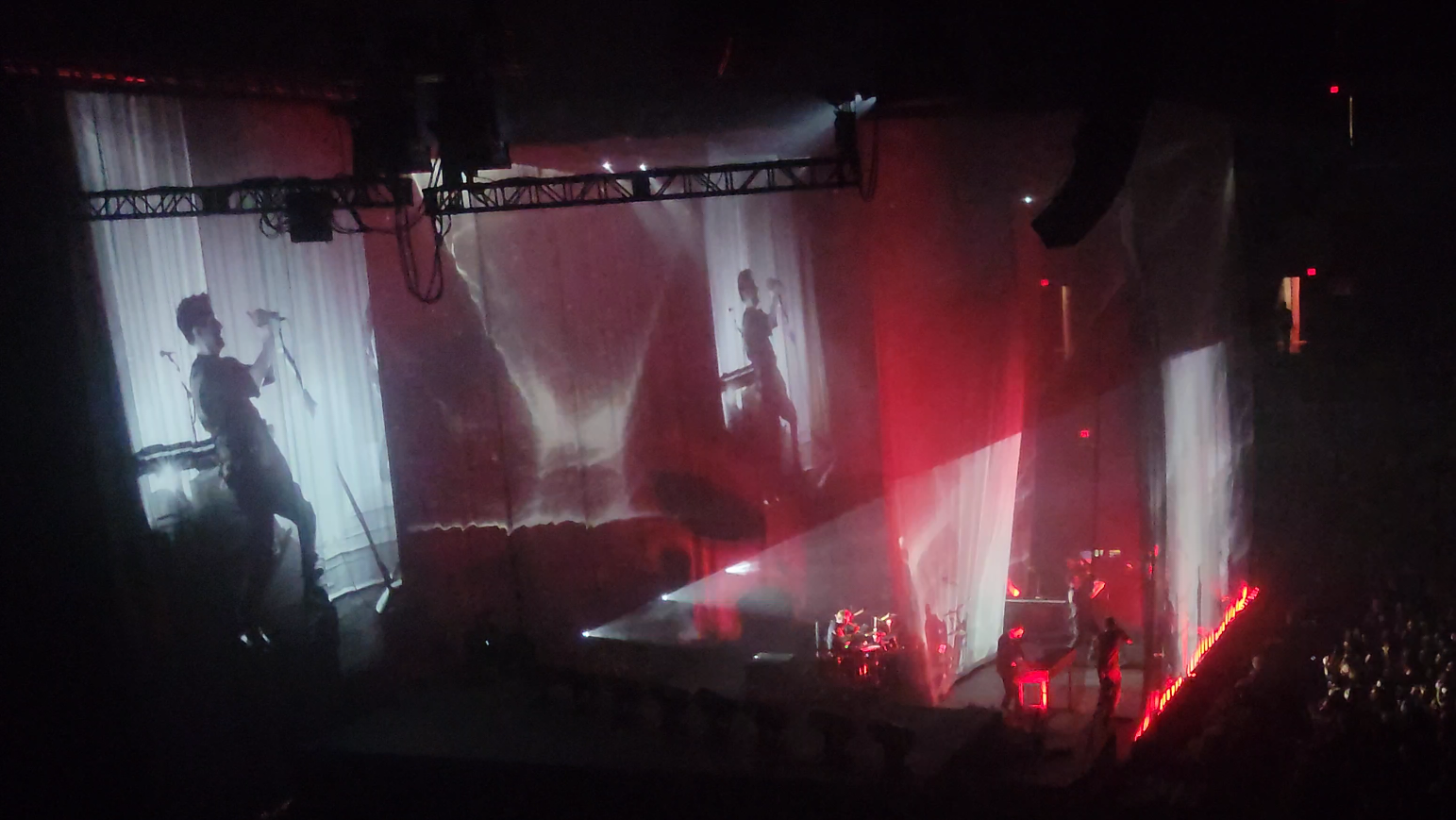
The staging of the Peel It Back Tour utilized the technique of 3D projecting visuals captured by hand-held cinematography onto translucent fabric

The arena concert format was structured around two performance spaces: a main stage for performing their hit songs, and a B-stage for the deep cuts, acoustic renditions, and remixes with Boys Noize. Produced by Live Nation, the shows were led in collaboration with creative director Todd Tourso and MTLA.studio, and featured the work of the band's longtime lighting designer Paul "Arlo" Guthrie. Tourso envisioned that to begin concerts, Reznor would intimately play the keyboard on the B-stage, which Tourso described as an "emotionally jarring, naked exposed" setting and which Reznor felt was a "terrible fucking idea" before going along with it; Tourso felt that his overall direction for the shows reflected his view of Nine Inch Nails as "naked and being vulnerable and being romantic" creatively, feeling that Reznor probably did not see the artistry of the band similarly to the way he did. The concert staging displayed visuals of rain, moving silhouettes, and dramatic curtain drops marking movements on the stage, shot with hand-held cinematography. The visuals were created using 3D projection onto translucent fabric, rather than typical LED panels. The imagery often produced a holographic effect, otherwise creating a psychedelic effect when footage was played out-of-sync. A mechanism was situated above the B-stage, which projected mood lighting for each song.

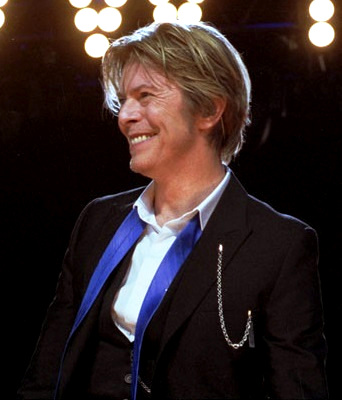
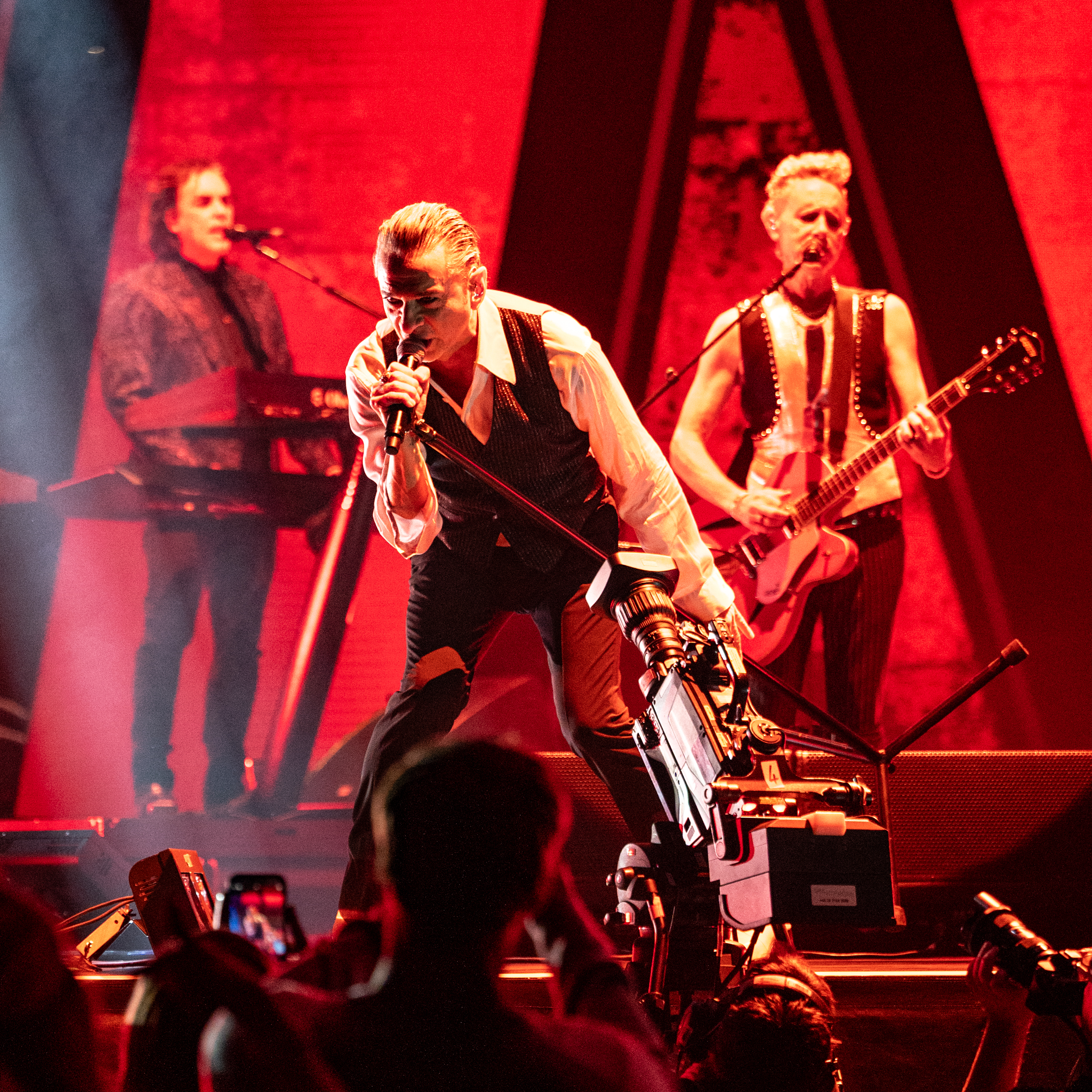
Nine Inch Nails included music by David Bowie and Depeche Mode in their sets

The band played songs from their releases including Pretty Hate Machine (1989), Broken (1992), The Downward Spiral (1994), Further Down the Spiral (1995), With Teeth (2005), Hesitation Marks (2013), and Not the Actual Events (2016). Niche songs played during the course of the tour included: "Branches/Bones", played for the first time since 2018; "Right Where It Belongs" (2005), "Ruiner" (1994), "Piggy (Nothing Can Stop Me Now)" (1995), "The Fragile" (1999), and "Non-Entity" (2009), all played for the first time since 2009; "That's What I Get" (1989) was played for the first time in 34 years, since 1991. The band often switched up their setlists from night to night. At the Manchester show, the song "A Minute to Breathe" (2016) by Reznor and Ross had its debut live performance, the beginning of the first North American leg in Oakland saw the live debut of the song "As Alive as You Need Me to Be" from the Tron: Ares soundtrack (2025), and the beginning of the second North American leg in New Orleans saw the live debut of "Something I Can Never Have" (1989). Cover songs played include David Bowie's "I'm Afraid of Americans" (1997), How to Destroy Angels's "Parasite" (2010), and Depeche Mode's "Stripped" (Note: A snippet of "Stripped" by Depeche Mode was played with Nine Inch Nails's song "Something I Can Never Have".) (1986).

== Reception ==
The Peel It Back Tour received critical acclaim. (Note: According to:) Aspects of praise were the lighting and production, energetic performances, and drummer Josh Freese's return. Consequence named Peel It Back the 2025 Live Act of the Year. Among the biggest concert tours in 2025, it attracted over 450,000 concertgoers during the 2025 shows.

"Hey, we're not here for this shit man. C'mon, hey! Hey! There's enough bullshit happening out there, we don't need it happening in the fuck here."

— Trent Reznor calling out some attendees for fighting during one of his closing performances of "Hurt"; one of several disruptions during shows at the tour that Reznor was praised for handling.

Concerning the debut show, The Times opined it was "a thrilling onslaught" of "angst, sincerity and a nightmarish otherworldliness" that brought to mind Reznor's recently passed creative collaborator David Lynch. Of the same show, The Irish Times praised the "satisfyingly immense" staging, and the artistry of the performances. Both papers agreed that the show took a little while to get into gear. Louder Sound wrote the performances of understated songs sparked "wonder and awe", and said the more energetic performances were "thrillingly violent" and palpable. Consequence described the production as "visually stunning", praising the futuristic lighting and lauding the projections on the main stage as "breathtaking" and cinematic. Evening Standard agreed the staging was "breathtaking". BrooklynVegan praised the lighting and talent of the cinematographer, and singled out the contrubutions of Tourso and Guthrie for achieving "jaw-dropping visuals" that "really made the show". Variety felt the smoke and large-scale projections were interesting, and said they could "render the uninitiated (or too stoned) speechless". They also wrote that Reznor was "impossibly cool", felt his "rock star shit" seemed effortless, and said his "soaring, sneering vocals" were as strong as they were at the beginning of his career. The San Francisco Chronicle wrote Reznor's voice was in "fine form" emotionally, projecting "anguish and loss with both force and nuance", and Billboard Canada wrote his "energetic" and "dark or angst-filled odes to lust, sin and addiction" had "firmly" captured the attention of the audience. Publications reported on disruptions during various shows, including a microphone malfunction at one show, Reznor being "baptized" by a leaky fog machine at another, what the Chicago Sun-Times described as "obnoxious Trent cat callers", a crowd surfing fan dressed as Santa Claus causing Reznor to burst into laughter despite his typically stoic demeanor, and at another show Reznor having to stop his performance of "Hurt" to break up a fight in the audience; critics noted Reznor's response and resolve in the face of these incidents. (Note: According to:)

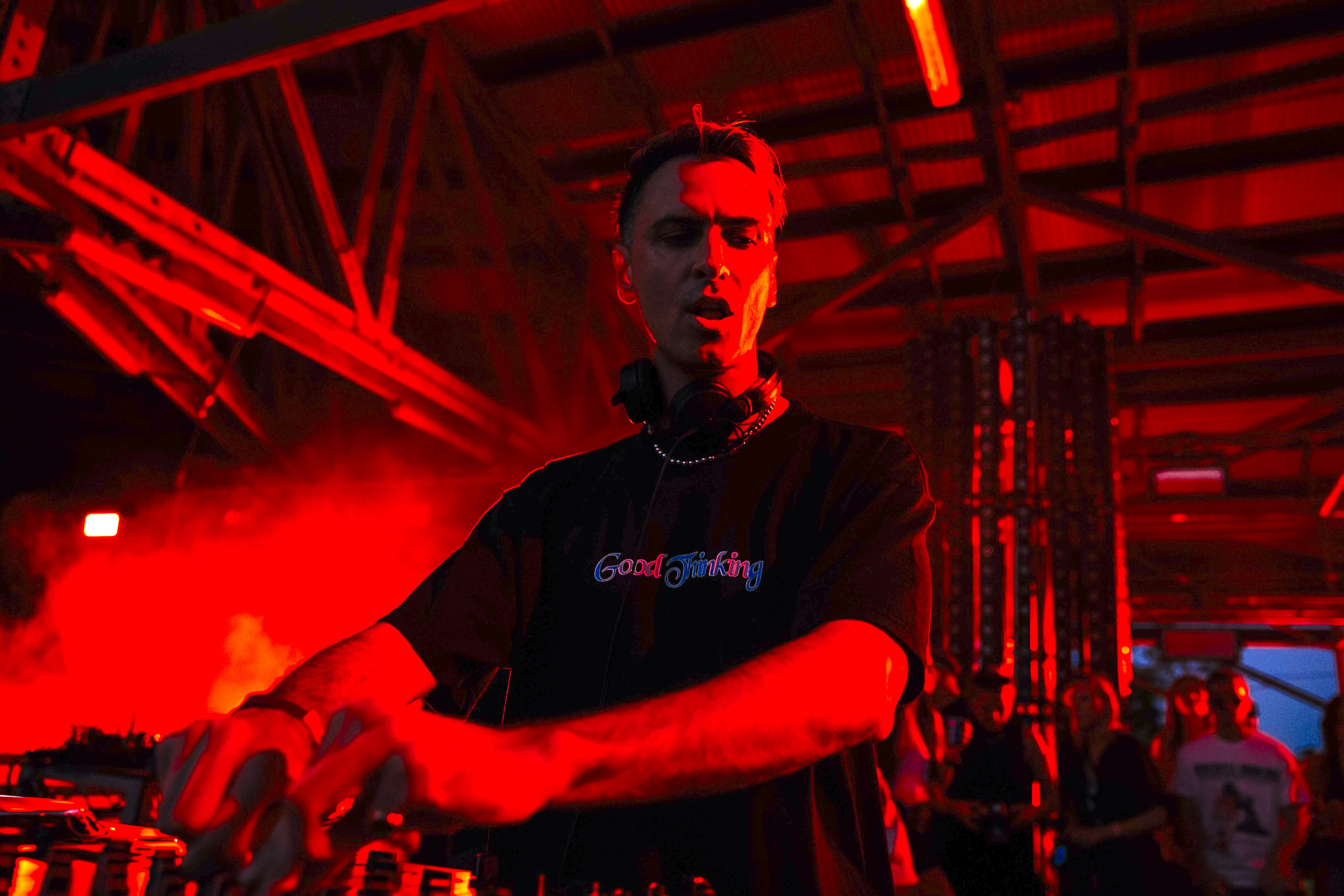
Boys Noize received praise for the energy and mood of his performances (Note: According to:)

Louder called the B-stage collaboration with Boys Noize "joyously intense", and The Irish Times described it as "thrilling" and compared it to a scene out of a dystopian film. Variety wrote positively of the "outrageously horny crowdpleaser" "Closer", and felt the "unexpected" "As Alive as You Need Me to Be" fit comfortably alongside the band's other hits. They wrote these remixes did not drastically reinvent the material but "added enough drama to remain a vital part" of the shows. The Evening Standard said the rendition of "Came Back Haunted" foremostly displayed the dance music aspect of the band, bringing to mind the score to Challengers, though The Times opined the B-stage performances as "crushing dancefloor workouts" that suggested "an indulgence between friends rather than a gesture to fans". Evening Standard said in his opening act, the DJ turned the scene into "a Blade film"—a "perfect setup" for the techno-inspired band, describing the set as erotically "moody, spectacular and pulsating"; Stereogum agreed with the Blade comparison and concurred that Boys Noize effectively set up a "mood" for Reznor. San Francisco Chronicle praised drummer Freese for his competency returning to the band in his first show, the Chicago Sun-Times wrote that the drum part on "The Perfect Drug"—a song Freese never played during his original tenure with the band—served as a litmus test for the drummer that the newspaper wrote he "passed with honors". Billboard Canada wrote that the only thing that could take the spotlight off of Reznor during the concert was Freese's "fiery drum solo". The Los Angeles Times wrote that by the end of the first North American leg Freese had become a "fan-favorite returning hero" who added "pure rocker muscle" to the band, and BrooklynVegan similarly noted positive fan reaction, praising his introductory drum solo during their show as "hypnoti[c]". Variety praised the versatility of the different members, who cycled through different instruments depending on the song.

Critics praised the political timeliness of performing "Head Like a Hole" and the Reznor-produced "I'm Afraid of Americans". (Note: According to:) Irish Times praised the "stark minimalist beauty" of "The Frail" and "doomy grandeur" of "The Wretched", the San Francisco Chronicle praised the rendition of "Copy of A", while Stereogum likened Reznor to Elton John during his piano performances. Variety felt the closing performances of "Head Like a Hole" and "Hurt" represented an "encapsulation" of Reznor's "strength as an artist" in presenting emotional music in an "arena-shaking" format. Louder described the ending performance of "Hurt" as quietly devastating, uniting an "enraptured" and "utterly immersed" room, The Irish Times described Reznor's "majestic" performance as reminding everyone of its roots past Johnny Cash's cover, and Billboard Canada said that given the impact of Cash's cover, Reznor and the band "did it proud" with a "compelling" rendition, opining it had a positive, lasting impact on the audience. The Times described "Hurt" as "quietly yet devastatingly" performed with "dark charisma"—describing it as a moment of "searing humanity and fragility", Los Angeles Times felt Reznor displayed "tightly coiled emotion and intimate grandeur" in his performance, and San Francisco Chronicle wrote that Reznor, with "visceral pain and regret", demonstrated that the words "Everyone I know / Goes away in the end" remained "timeless" decades after the song's release.

== Tour dates ==
List of 2025 concerts, showing date, city, country and locale
Date (2025)	City	Country	Venue / festival
June 15	Dublin	Ireland	3Arena
June 17	Manchester	England	Co-op Live
June 18	London	England	The O2 Arena
June 20	Cologne	Germany	Lanxess Arena
June 21^{[a]}	Dessel	Belgium	Graspop Metal Meeting
June 24	Milan	Italy	Parco Musica Milano
June 26	Zürich	Switzerland	Hallenstadion
June 27	Vienna	Austria	Wiener Stadthalle
June 29	Amsterdam	Netherlands	Ziggo Dome
July 1	Berlin	Germany	Uber Arena
July 3^{[a]}	Gdynia	Poland	Open'er Festival
July 5^{[a]}	Roskilde	Denmark	Roskilde Festival
July 7	Paris	France	Accor Arena
July 11^{[a]}	Madrid	Spain	Mad Cool
July 12^{[a]}	Oeiras	Portugal	NOS Alive
August 6	Oakland	United States	Oakland Arena
August 8	Portland	United States	Moda Center
August 10	Vancouver	Canada	Rogers Arena
August 12	Seattle	United States	Climate Pledge Arena
August 14	West Valley City	United States	Maverik Center
August 15	Denver	United States	Ball Arena
August 17	Saint Paul	United States	Xcel Energy Center
August 19	Chicago	United States	United Center
August 20	Chicago	United States	United Center
August 22	Detroit	United States	Little Caesars Arena
August 23	Toronto	Canada	Scotiabank Arena
August 26	Baltimore	United States	CFG Bank Arena
August 27	Philadelphia	United States	Xfinity Mobile Arena
August 29	Boston	United States	TD Garden
August 31	Cleveland	United States	Rocket Arena
September 2	Brooklyn	United States	Barclays Center
September 3	Brooklyn	United States	Barclays Center
September 5	Raleigh	United States	Lenovo Center
September 6	Nashville	United States	Bridgestone Arena
September 9	Duluth	United States	Gas South Arena
September 10	Tampa	United States	Benchmark International Arena
September 12	Houston	United States	Toyota Center
September 13	Fort Worth	United States	Dickies Arena
September 16	Phoenix	United States	PHX Arena
September 18	Inglewood	United States	Kia Forum
September 19	Inglewood	United States	Kia Forum

Notes

- ^{^[a]}This concert was part of a European music festival.

List of 2026 concerts, showing date, city, country and locale
Date (2026)	City	Country	Venue
February 5	New Orleans	United States	Smoothie King Center
February 7	Jacksonville	United States	VyStar Veterans Memorial Arena
February 10	Charlotte	United States	Spectrum Center
February 11	Washington, DC	United States	Capital One Arena
February 13	Boston	United States	TD Garden
February 14	Newark	United States	Prudential Center
February 16	Montreal	Canada	Bell Centre
February 18	Hamilton	Canada	TD Coliseum
February 20	Columbus	United States	Schottenstein Center
February 22	Grand Rapids	United States	Van Andel Arena
February 23	Milwaukee	United States	Fiserv Forum
February 25	St. Louis	United States	Enterprise Center
February 27	Tulsa	United States	BOK Center
March 1	Austin	United States	Moody Center
March 3	Dallas	United States	American Airlines Center
March 6	Glendale	United States	Desert Diamond Arena
March 7	Las Vegas	United States	MGM Grand Garden Arena
March 9	San Diego	United States	Pechanga Arena
March 10	Anaheim	United States	Honda Center
March 13	Salt Lake City	United States	Delta Center
March 15	San Francisco	United States	Chase Center
March 16	Sacramento	United States	Golden 1 Center

List of canceled concerts, showing date, city, country, and locale
Date (2025)	City	Country	Venue
July 8	Lyon	France	LDLC Arena
