= As Alive as You Need Me to Be =

Single by Nine Inch Nails

from the album Tron: Ares (Original Motion Picture Soundtrack)
- B-side: "Building Better Worlds" (Comic-Con-exclusive vinyl single); "Empathetic Response" (standard vinyl single)
- Released: July 17, 2025
- Genre: Industrial rock; synthwave; electronic
- Length: 3:53
- Label: Interscope
- Songwriters: Trent Reznor; Atticus Ross
- Producers: Trent Reznor; Atticus Ross; Boys Noize

Nine Inch Nails singles chronology
"Isn't Everyone" (2021)	"As Alive as You Need Me to Be" (2025)

Halo numbers chronology
Halo 34 (2020)	Halo 35 (2025)	Halo 36 (2025)

Music video
- As Alive as You Need Me to Be (Official Music Video) on YouTube

"As Alive as You Need Me to Be" is a song by American industrial rock band Nine Inch Nails released on July 17, 2025 as the lead single from their score for the film Tron: Ares (2025). It is the first Nine Inch Nails release in four years, following their Health collaboration "Isn't Everyone" (2021), and it is their first non-collaboration release since the double release of Ghosts V: Together and Ghosts VI: Locusts (2020).

== Release and reception ==
A few days before the song's release, its title was teased on a T-shirt sold at European dates on the band's Peel It Back world tour.

The release was accompanied by a lyric video uploaded to Nine Inch Nails' official YouTube channel, as well as a new trailer for Tron: Ares featuring the song. The release date, track list, and pre-orders for the film's soundtrack were also announced on the day of the song's release.

The song debuted at No. 10 on Billboard's Dance Digital Song Sales chart, and received nominations for the Best Rock Song and Best Song Written for Visual Media, winning the former at the 68th Annual Grammy Awards.

Stereogum described the song as "a fearsome rocker built on retro-futuristic '80s electro synths" with "Reznor [bringing] real ferocity to his lead vocal", while Uproxx described it as "an electronic banger [...] that could fit on a regular NIN studio album". Furthermore, Revolver characterized the track by its "huge-ass synth-bass rhythms and quake-inducing drum-machine beats [as well as] a devilishly melodic, distortion-pressed chorus", also theorizing that its "vocoded backups [are] perhaps a nod to previous Tron scorers Daft Punk".

=== Accolades ===
Award	Date of ceremony	Category	Recipient(s)	Result	Ref.
Grammy Awards	February 1, 2026	Best Rock Song	Nine Inch Nails for "As Alive As You Need Me To Be”	Won	
Grammy Awards	February 1, 2026	Best Song Written for Visual Media	Nine Inch Nails for "As Alive As You Need Me To Be”	Nominated	

== Music video ==
In September 2025, a music video directed by Maxime Quoilin was released. According to Jon Blistein of Rolling Stone, the video is centered "around a close-up performance from Trent Reznor, while using an array of different effects to bend space and warp reality." Revolver describes the video as a "pixelscape of terror" with Reznor and Ross "tormented by bizarre, CGI-mangled fists scraping across their skin."

== Track listings ==
All tracks written by Trent Reznor and Atticus Ross.

=== San Diego Comic-Con-exclusive 7" single ===
Side A
No.	Title	Length
1.	"As Alive as You Need Me to Be"	3:53

Side B
No.	Title	Length
1.	"Building Better Worlds"	2:11

=== Standard 7" single ===
Side A
No.	Title	Length
1.	"As Alive as You Need Me to Be"	3:53

Side B
No.	Title	Length
1.	"Empathetic Response"	2:23

== Charts ==
=== Weekly charts ===
Weekly chart performance for "As Alive as You Need Me to Be"
Chart (2025)	Peak position
Australia Digital Tracks (ARIA)	45
Canada Mainstream Rock (Billboard Canada)	10
Canada Modern Rock (Billboard Canada)	5
Czech Republic Modern Rock (ČNS IFPI)	12
German Alternative Singles (GfK)	1
Italy Rock Airplay (FIMI)	10
Japan Hot Overseas (Billboard Japan)	12
UK Singles Downloads (OCC)	74
UK Singles Sales (OCC)	12
US Hot Dance/Pop Songs (Billboard)	10
US Hot Rock & Alternative Songs (Billboard)	22

=== Year-end charts ===
Year-end chart performance for "As Alive as You Need Me to Be"
Chart (2025)	Position
Canada Mainstream Rock (Billboard)	60
Canada Modern Rock (Billboard)	75
US Rock & Alternative Airplay (Billboard)	36
