= Ghosts V: Together =

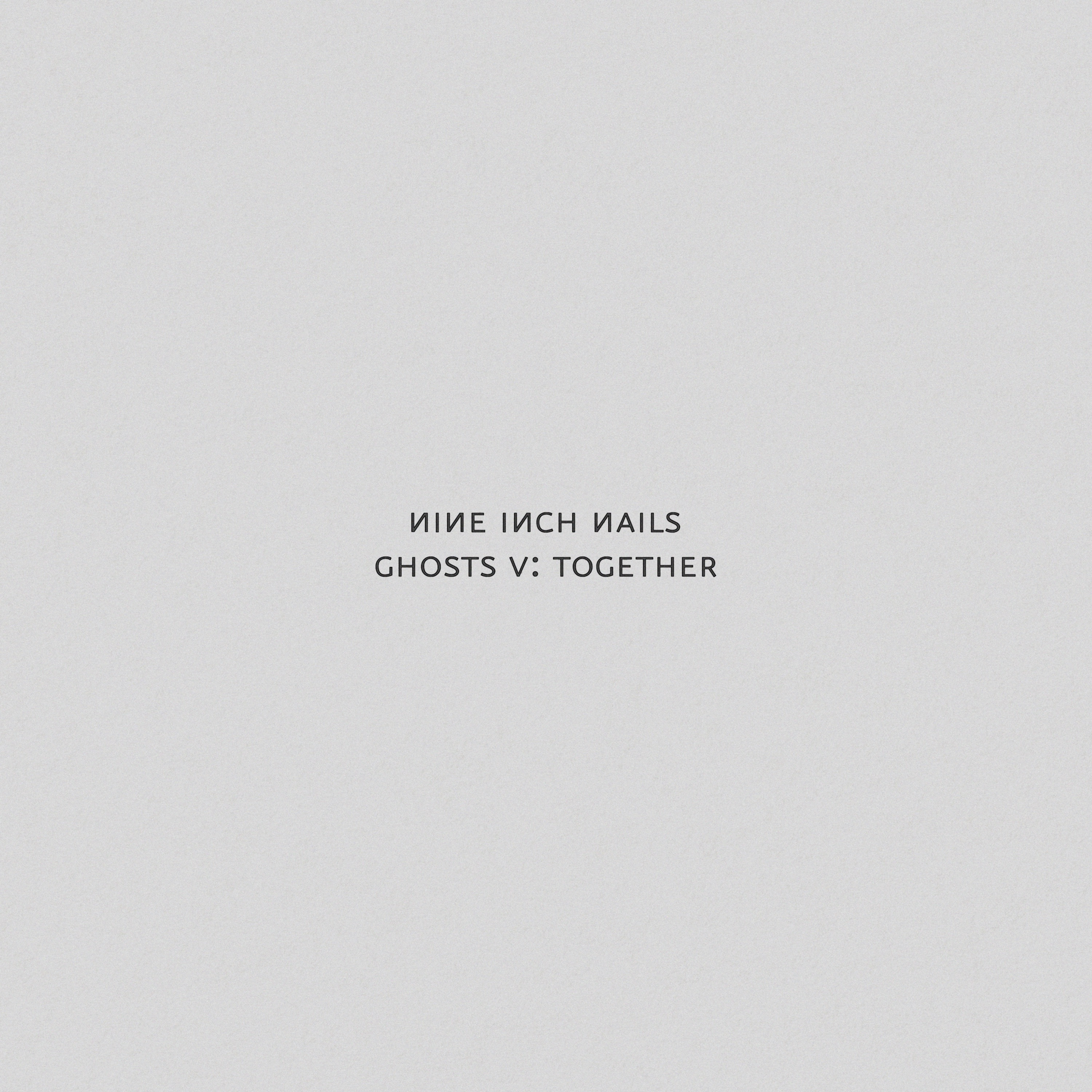

Studio album by Nine Inch Nails
- Released: March 26, 2020
- Genre: Ambient
- Length: 70:24
- Label: The Null Corporation
- Producers: Trent Reznor; Atticus Ross

Nine Inch Nails chronology
Bad Witch (2018)	Ghosts V: Together (2020)	Ghosts VI: Locusts (2020)

Halo numbers chronology
Halo 32 (2018)	Halo 33 (2020)	Halo 34 (2020)

Ghosts V: Together is the tenth studio album by the American industrial rock band Nine Inch Nails. It was released as a free download on March 26, 2020, as a show of solidarity with the band's fans during the COVID-19 pandemic. It is a follow-up to the 2008 instrumental album Ghosts I–IV, and released simultaneously with their eleventh album, Ghosts VI: Locusts.

== Background ==
In 2019, after releasing their eighth soundtrack to the film Bird Box, Trent Reznor and Atticus Ross completed a subsequent score for The Woman in the Window; however, when the production studio decided to re-edit the film after test screenings, Reznor and Ross's score was withdrawn. When discussing the project, Reznor admitted, "It's frustrating when you did that much work and it's gone. And we were proud—and they were proud—of the movie that it was."

In March 2020, following two subsequent 2019 soundtracks Watchmen and Waves, Reznor announced two unexpected releases, Ghosts V: Together and Ghosts VI: Locusts, for free download through the official Nine Inch Nails website, YouTube channel, and streaming platforms: "Hours and hours of music. Free. Some of it kind of happy, some not so much." The band's website added, "As the news seems to turn ever more grim by the hour, we've found ourselves vacillating wildly between feeling like there may be hope at times to utter despair—often changing minute to minute. Although each of us define ourselves as antisocial-types who prefer being on our own, this situation has really made us appreciate the power and need for CONNECTION."

Two tracks from the album have been featured in the FX comedy-drama television series The Bear: "Hope We Can Again" featured in the season two finale, "The Bear", and "Together" subsequently featured extensively in the season three premiere, "Tomorrow".

== Critical reception ==
Professional ratings
Aggregate scores
Source	Rating
AnyDecentMusic?	7.8/10
Metacritic	81/100
Review scores
Source	Rating
AllMusic	2/5 stars
Blabbermouth.net	9/10
Exclaim!	8/10
The Line of Best Fit	8.5/10
Loud and Quiet	8/10
NME	4/5 stars
Paste	8.7/10
Pitchfork	7.7/10
Rolling Stone	4/5 stars
Sputnikmusic	3.8/5

According to the review aggregator Metacritic, Ghosts V: Together received "universal acclaim" based on a weighted average score of 81 out of 100 from 11 critic scores. James McMahon of NME referred to the album as "more soothing than balm," and "a soundtrack to an edit of 2001: A Space Odyssey where no-one dies." Rolling Stone's Kory Grow thought that Ghosts V and Ghosts VI "felt like distinct artistic statements unlike the first Ghosts collection." Grow also remarked that Ghosts V was "spacious with gentle buzzing, humming, and exhaling drones that slowly evolve, complementing often pretty piano music." Sean T. Collins of Pitchfork considered the record as "solidly the stronger of the two", noting that "throughout, there's a vibe of quiet optimism".

For Jon Pareles of The New York Times, "the more approachable of the two albums," Ghosts V is "largely meditative, circling through melodic patterns and touching down in consonance. The music is not entirely soothing [...] but it hints at some possibility of confluence, stability and eventual resolution." The album "has prettier, warmer ingredients [...], serenely elegiac piano melodies, counterpoint in plinking bell tones and choirs of sampled voices."

Spin critic John Paul Bullock described both records as "heady, confrontational albums that, like the best art, force consideration and conversation" while noting them to be "definitely not a polite distraction from what's going on in the world outside of your home." Bullock further thought that the tracks on Ghosts V are "big, bold, dynamic, and show a particular mastery of modular synthesis" and various influences on the record do not "overshadow the originality of Reznor and Ross's sound." Sputnikmusic critic Simon regarded Ghosts V as "more organic and acoustic sounding" than Ghosts VI, and remarked that the record "features a calmer, at times relaxed sound, yet you can feel tension slowly mounting around you." Neil Z. Yeung made a similar comparison in the review for AllMusic, claiming the album is "the warm yang to its partner's darker yin, an atmospheric and soothing work that aims to comfort and offer hope."

== Track listing ==
Track listing for Ghosts V: Together
No.	Title	Length
1.	"Letting Go While Holding On"	9:40
2.	"Together"	10:04
3.	"Out in the Open"	5:16
4.	"With Faith"	9:40
5.	"Apart"	13:36
6.	"Your Touch"	4:28
7.	"Hope We Can Again"	7:28
8.	"Still Right Here"	10:12
Total length:		70:24

== Charts ==
Chart performance for Ghosts V: Together
Chart (2020)	Peak position
US Top Album Sales (Billboard)	64
US Top Current Album Sales (Billboard)	51
