= Challengers (soundtrack) =

2024 soundtrack album by Trent Reznor and Atticus Ross

Challengers (Original Score)

Film score by Trent Reznor and Atticus Ross
- Released: April 26, 2024
- Genre: Electronic
- Length: 40:50
- Label: Milan
- Producer: Trent Reznor; Atticus Ross

Trent Reznor and Atticus Ross film score chronology
The Killer (Original Score) (2023)	Challengers (Original Score) (2024)	Queer (Original Score) (2024)

Luca Guadagnino film score chronology
Bones and All (Original Score) (2022)	Challengers (Original Score) (2024)	Queer (Original Score) (2024)

Challengers (Original Score) is the soundtrack album composed by Trent Reznor and Atticus Ross for the 2024 film Challengers by Luca Guadagnino. It was digitally released by Milan Records on April 26, 2024, the same day as the film's theatrical release in the United States.

== Production ==
Trent Reznor and Atticus Ross had previously worked with director Luca Guadagnino, scoring Guadagnino's 2022 film Bones and All. Guadagnino approached the pair to score Challengers by sending them an email that read, "Do you want to be on my next film? It's going to be super sexxy [sic]." Guadagnino wanted "very loud techno music" for the film, taking inspiration from Berlin techno and '90s rave music. The end result was intended to amplify the pace and high-stakes nature of the film.

== Critical reception ==
The score received widespread acclaim from critics. Ty Burr of The Washington Post called the soundtrack "one of [Reznor and Ross's] best to date." Mireia Mullor of Digital Spy called the score "phenomenal", while Robbie Collin of The Telegraph called it "counterintuitively perfect". Max Weiss of Baltimore called the score a "standout", writing, "It's mostly fast-paced electronica, which disrupts and propels the action at unexpected moments. It has a freneticism with fuels the film." The track "Challengers: Match Point" was featured on NPR's list of the 124 Best Songs of 2024, with critic Jacob Ganz calling it a "200 proof shot of adrenaline".

Coleman Spilde of The Daily Beast wrote, "Such euphoric filmmaking is enhanced by Trent Reznor and Atticus Ross' intoxicating, synth-heavy score, which asserts itself as an indispensable part of the film. In Challengers, the music acts as punctuation, both periods and ellipses." Richard Roeper of the Chicago Sun-Times wrote that the score "[captures] the electric heartbeat of the movie." Tim Grierson of Screen Daily wrote that "Trent Reznor and Atticus Ross [concocted] a techno-heavy score that lends the matches a dance-party urgency that is both witty and invigorating."

Maureen Lee Lenker of Entertainment Weekly wrote, "[Reznor and Ross] craft a pulsating, synth-filled composition that ratchets up the tension until it's taut as the strings of a racquet. It's as if the U.S. Open decided to use sonic riffs from Miami Vice as a theme song. The electronic, staccato rhythm mimics the rapid back-and-forth of tennis while also catapulting us into a sound that is inherently sexy in the ways it evokes the hypnotic trance of a dance club."

Liz Shannon Miller of Consequence wrote, "Propelling the on-court action is Reznor and Ross's score, bringing a level of bombast to the sports action that at times threatens to overwhelm the action, without ever actually proving distracting." Angelica Jade Bastién of Vulture wrote that the score "lends the film a tense propulsion that the storytelling itself desperately lacks." Caryn James of BBC wrote, "One of the best surprises turns out to be the soundtrack by Trent Reznor and Atticus Ross, a propulsive techno score that does a lot of the work to keep the tennis scenes moving."

Valerie Complex of Deadline wrote, "Trent Reznor and Atticus Ross' score, typically a highlight, feels oddly juxtaposed against the film's visual and emotional landscape with its '80s synth-pop elements. At times, it enhances the scenes' emotional depth, but more often it distracts, undermining the subtlety of the performances and the intimacy of certain moments."

Select year-end rankings for Challengers
Publication	List	Rank	Ref.
Paste	The 100 Best Albums of 2024	74	

== Accolades ==
Challengers (Original Score) awards and nominations
Award	Year (Note: Indicates the year of ceremony. Each year is linked to the article about the awards held that year, wherever possible.)	Category	Recipients	Result	Ref.
Astra Creative Arts Awards	2024	Best Original Score	Trent Reznor and Atticus Ross	Nominated	
Astra Creative Arts Awards	2024	Best Original Song	"Compress / Repress"	Nominated	
Chicago Film Critics Association Awards	2024	Best Original Score	Trent Reznor and Atticus Ross	Won	
Critics' Choice Movie Awards	2025	Best Score	Trent Reznor and Atticus Ross	Won	
Critics' Choice Movie Awards	2025	Best Song	"Compress / Repress"	Nominated	
Golden Globe Awards	2025	Best Original Score	Trent Reznor and Atticus Ross	Won	
Golden Globe Awards	2025	Best Original Song	"Compress / Repress"	Nominated	
Grammy Awards	2025	Best Score Soundtrack For Visual Media	Trent Reznor and Atticus Ross	Nominated	
Hollywood Music in Media Awards	2024	Best Original Score in a Feature Film	Trent Reznor and Atticus Ross	Nominated	
Hollywood Music in Media Awards	2024	Best Original Song in a Feature Film	"Compress / Repress"	Nominated	
iHeartRadio Music Awards	2025	Favorite Soundtrack	Trent Reznor and Atticus Ross	Nominated	
Los Angeles Film Critics Association Awards	2024	Best Music Score	Trent Reznor and Atticus Ross	Won	
NAACP Image Awards	2025	Outstanding Original Score for TV/Film	Trent Reznor and Atticus Ross	Nominated	

== Track listing ==
All music is composed by Trent Reznor and Atticus Ross, except as noted.

Challengers (Original Score) track listing
No.	Title	Length
1.	"Challengers"	1:25
2.	""I Know""	2:18
3.	"Yeah X10"	2:38
4.	"L'Œuf"	3:59
5.	"The Signal"	3:11
6.	"Brutalizer"	3:01
7.	"Stopper"	1:42
8.	"Brutalizer 2"	1:58
9.	"The Points That Matter"	1:49
10.	"Lullaby"	0:38
11.	"Final Set"	3:06
12.	"Pull Over"	2:48
13.	"Friday Afternoons, Op. 7: A New Year Carol" (composed by Benjamin Britten; performed by Choir of Downside School, Purley, Viola Tunnard, and Britten)	2:06
14.	"Friday Afternoons, Op. 7: A New Year Carol (Part 2)" (composed by Britten)	1:14
15.	"Challengers: Match Point"	5:02
16.	"Compress / Repress" (written by Reznor, Ross, and Luca Guadagnino)	3:49
Total length:		40:50

== Personnel ==
- Trent Reznor – composer (tracks 1–12, 15–16), producer (tracks 1–12, 14–16), performer (tracks 1–12, 14–16)
- Atticus Ross – composer (tracks 1–12, 15–16), producer (tracks 1–12, 14–16), performer (tracks 1–12, 14–16)
- Benjamin Britten – composer (tracks 13–14), conductor (track 13)
- Jacob Moreno – engineer (tracks 1–12, 14–16)
- Randy Merrill – mastering (tracks 1–12, 14–16)
- Mariqueen Maandig-Reznor – performer (track 16)

== Charts ==
Chart performance for Challengers (Original Score)
Chart (2024)	Peak position
Scottish Albums (OCC)	57
UK Dance Albums (OCC)	6
UK Soundtrack Albums (OCC)	1
US Soundtrack Albums (Billboard)	8
US Top Album Sales (Billboard)	17
US Top Dance Albums (Billboard)	4

== Release history ==
Release history and formats for Challengers (Original Score)
Region	Date	Format(s)	Label(s)	Ref.
Various	April 26, 2024	Digital download; streaming	Milan	
Various	November 1, 2024	LP	Milan	

== Challengers [Mixed] ==
Challengers [Mixed]

Remix album by Trent Reznor, Atticus Ross and Boys Noize
- Released: April 12, 2024
- Genre: Electronic
- Length: 28:13
- Label: Milan
- Producer: Boys Noize; Trent Reznor; Atticus Ross

Before the film and soundtrack's release, Reznor and Ross approached German producer Boys Noize about creating a remix album for the film's score. Initially, Boys Noize was hesitant about changing Reznor and Ross's original work too much, only making minor edits, but the pair encouraged him to be more experimental. He had not seen the film or a trailer until the remix album was completed.

The remix album was released on April 12, 2024, two weeks before the official soundtrack album was released. For Record Store Day, 2,100 copies of the album were released on November 29, 2024.

=== Reception ===
Paolo Ragusa of Consequence called the remix album "astounding" and wrote, "Dance music at its core is built from what came before; it is meant to be extracted and expanded, remixed and recontexualized. A film score is not usually the subject of such chopping and screwing, but if anyone was going to do it and absolutely nail it, it's Trent Reznor, Atticus Ross, and Boys Noize."

=== Track listing ===
All music is composed by Boys Noize, Trent Reznor, and Atticus Ross, except as noted.

Challengers [Mixed] track listing
No.	Title	Length
1.	""I Know""	3:05
2.	"Yeah X10"	3:36
3.	"L'Œuf"	2:15
4.	"Challengers"	3:00
5.	"Pre Signal"	0:55
6.	"The Signal"	4:38
7.	"Brutalizer"	5:11
8.	"Compress / Repress" (written by Reznor, Ross, and Luca Guadagnino; performed by Reznor, Ross, and Mariqueen Maandig Reznor)	4:51
9.	"A New Year Carol" (written by Benjamin Britten)	0:38
Total length:		28:13

Notes

- All tracks are subtitled as "Mixed" in square brackets.
