= God Break Down the Door =

Nine Inch Nails song

Single by Nine Inch Nails

from the album Bad Witch
- Released: May 17, 2018
- Genre: Jazz fusion; electro-jazz; trip hop
- Length: 4:15
- Label: The Null Corporation
- Songwriters: Trent Reznor; Atticus Ross
- Producers: Trent Reznor; Atticus Ross

Nine Inch Nails singles chronology
"Less Than" (2017)	"God Break Down the Door" (2018)	"Isn't Everyone" (2021)

Audio sample
- "God Break Down the Door": file; help

"God Break Down the Door" is a song by American industrial rock band Nine Inch Nails, from their ninth studio album Bad Witch. It was released on May 17, 2018, coinciding with Trent Reznor's 53rd birthday. The song features Reznor playing the saxophone.

== Background and composition ==
American industrial rock band Nine Inch Nails released their fifth extended play (EP) Not the Actual Events on December 23, 2016. Six months later, frontman Trent Reznor announced that Not the Actual Events was the first in a series of three Nine Inch Nails EPs that would be released six to eight months apart. At the time the second installment, Add Violence, was released on July 13, 2017, Reznor told NME that he had "no idea what the last part of this will be". The final part of the trilogy faced delays as Reznor believed the original concept "felt too predictable ... like we were forcing things". As the songwriting process dragged on, the band decided to incorporate elements that they considered "exciting and risky", such as incorporating saxophone.

Reznor explained the song originated from his desire to "get his technique back" on playing the saxophone, which he had sporadically played for 20 years. In addition to the saxophone, the song prominently features acid house breakbeats and what is described as a "frantic drumbeat", and has been described by critics as jazz fusion, electro-jazz, and trip hop.

Reznor described the writing of the song, stating

"Looking around the studio and seeing the untouched baritone tenor and alto sax that are sitting there ... they're there because they remind me that I can't play them as well as I used to be able to. There they sit taunting me in the corner. We pulled them out and we just started fucking around really, led with Atticus arranging. I was just kind of going, an hour performance kind of turned into this thing that felt like we hadn't been there before and that started to reveal a whole different character. The space changed and then we felt motivated. When it came time to sing I was really just trying things out, just to see. I never had the courage to sing like that, I didn't know I could sing."

== Release and reception ==
"God Break Down the Door" was announced and released as the lead single and fourth track to Bad Witch on May 17, 2018. The song premiered on Zane Lowe's Beats 1 show on Apple Music.

Pitchfork named the song "Best New Track", comparing it to the works of Outside-era David Bowie, stating: "While the reference points are immediately obvious, the impact of 'God Break Down the Door' is in just how different it sounds for Reznor. And it's not only his voice. There's a new energy in the arrangement: a constantly shifting thing full of frenzied marimba and apocalyptic squelches that zaps the throwback crunch of the last two NIN EPs into dust."

== Personnel ==
- Trent Reznor – vocals, saxophone, production
- Atticus Ross – performance, production
