= Nine Inch Nails =

American industrial rock band

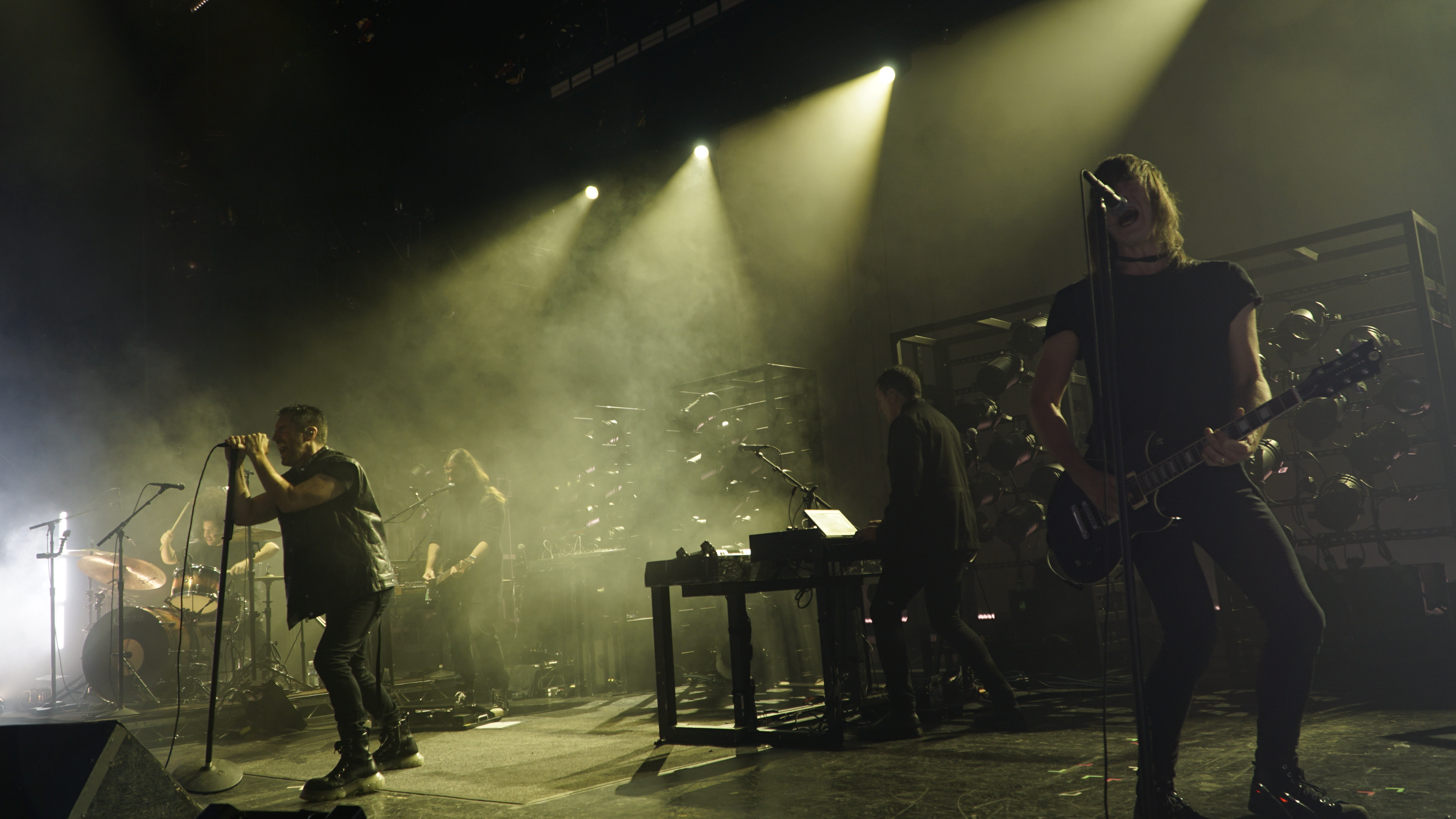
- Nine Inch Nails performing at the O2 Apollo Manchester in 2022; (L–R): Ilan Rubin, Trent Reznor, Alessandro Cortini, Atticus Ross, Robin Finck

Background information
- Origin: Cleveland, Ohio, U.S.
- Genres: Industrial rock; electronic rock; industrial; industrial metal; alternative rock
- Works: Discography; songs
- Years active: 1988–present
- Labels: Nothing; TVT; Interscope; Columbia; Capitol; The Null Corporation
- Spinoffs: How to Destroy Angels; Nine Inch Noize
- Awards: Full list
- Members: Trent Reznor; Atticus Ross
- Website: nin.com

Nine Inch Nails, commonly abbreviated as NIN (stylized as NIИ), is an American industrial rock band formed by singer, songwriter, multi-instrumentalist, film composer and producer Trent Reznor in 1988 in Cleveland, Ohio. Reznor was the sole permanent member of the band until his frequent collaborator, English musician Atticus Ross, became an official member in 2016. The band's debut album, Pretty Hate Machine (1989), was released via TVT Records. After disagreements with TVT over how the album would be promoted, the band signed with Interscope Records and released the EP Broken (1992), followed by the albums The Downward Spiral (1994) and The Fragile (1999).

Following a hiatus, Nine Inch Nails resumed touring and released their fourth album With Teeth (2005). Following the release of the next album Year Zero (2007), the band left Interscope after a feud on pricing and distribution of the album. Nine Inch Nails continued touring and independently released Ghosts I–IV (2008) and The Slip (2008) before a second hiatus. Their eighth album, Hesitation Marks (2013), was followed by a trilogy which consisted of the EPs Not the Actual Events (2016) and Add Violence (2017) and their ninth album Bad Witch (2018). The band simultaneously released two further installments of the Ghosts series in 2020: Ghosts V: Together and Ghosts VI: Locusts. In 2024, Nine Inch Nails announced a number of new projects through their multimedia company With Teeth; the following year, they embarked on the Peel It Back Tour and released the soundtrack to Tron: Ares.

When touring, Reznor typically assembles a live band to perform with him under the Nine Inch Nails name. This live band has varied over the decades, with various members leaving and returning; the current lineup consists of Reznor and Ross alongside Robin Finck (who initially joined in 1994), Stu Brooks (who joined in 2026), and Josh Freese (who initially joined in 2005). The band's concerts are noted for their extensive use of thematic visual elements, complex special effects, and elaborate lighting. Songs are often rearranged to fit any given performance, and the melodies or lyrics of songs that are not scheduled to be performed are sometimes assimilated into other songs.

Nine Inch Nails has sold over 20 million records worldwide and been nominated for 13 Grammy Awards, winning for the songs "Wish" in 1993, "Happiness in Slavery" in 1996 and "As Alive as You Need Me to Be" in 2026. Time magazine named Reznor one of its most influential people in 1997, while Spin magazine has described him as "the most vital artist in music". In 2004, Rolling Stone ranked Nine Inch Nails No. 94 on its list of the "100 Greatest Artists of All Time". Nine Inch Nails was inducted into the Rock and Roll Hall of Fame in 2020, having first been nominated in 2014 (their first year of eligibility) and again in 2015. Nine Inch Nail is currently nominated for Best Engineered Album, Non-Classical for the 69th Annual Grammy award under their collaboration band Nine Inch Noize.

== History ==
=== Formation (1987–1988) ===
While living in Cleveland in 1987, Trent Reznor played keyboards in the Exotic Birds, a synth-pop band managed by John Malm Jr. Reznor became friends with Malm, who informally became his manager when he left to work on his own music. At the time, Reznor was employed as an assistant engineer and janitor at Right Track Studios. Studio owner Bart Koster granted Reznor free access to the studio between bookings to record demos, commenting that it cost him nothing more than "a little wear on [his] tape heads". Unable to find a band that could articulate the material as he desired, Reznor was inspired by Prince to play all instruments himself except drums, which he programmed electronically. He has continued to play most parts on Nine Inch Nails recordings ever since.

The first Nine Inch Nails live performance took place at Graffiti in Pittsburgh, Pennsylvania, on October 27, 1988. Soon after, following their live support of Skinny Puppy, Reznor aimed to release one 12-inch single on a small European label. Several labels responded favorably to the demo material and Reznor signed with TVT Records. Nine demos, recorded live in November 1988 and collectively known as Purest Feeling, were released in revised form on the first studio album, Pretty Hate Machine (1989). The overall sound on Purest Feeling is lighter than that of Pretty Hate Machine; several songs contain more live drumming and guitar, as well as a heavier use of film samples.

Reznor chose the name "Nine Inch Nails" because it "abbreviated easily" rather than for "any literal meaning". Other rumored explanations have circulated, alleging that Reznor chose to refer to Jesus's crucifixion with nine-inch spikes, or Freddy Krueger's nine-inch fingernails. The Nine Inch Nails logo first appeared on the music video for their debut single, "Down in It". Reznor and Gary Talpas designed the logo, inspired by Tibor Kalman's typography on the Talking Heads album Remain in Light. The logo features the band's initials, with the second N mirrored. Talpas, a native of Cleveland, continued to design Nine Inch Nails packaging until 1997.

=== Pretty Hate Machine (1988–1991) ===
Written, arranged, and performed by Reznor, Nine Inch Nails' first album Pretty Hate Machine debuted in 1989. It marked his first collaboration with Adrian Sherwood (who produced the lead single "Down in It" in London without meeting Reznor face-to-face) and Mark "Flood" Ellis. Reznor asked Sean Beavan to mix the demos of Pretty Hate Machine, which had received multiple offers for record deals. He mixed sound during Nine Inch Nails' live concerts for several years, eventually becoming an unofficial member of the live band and singing live backup vocals from his place at the mixing console. Flood's production would appear on each major Nine Inch Nails release until 1994, and Sherwood has made remixes for the band as recently as 2000. Reznor and his co-producers expanded upon the Right Track Studio demos by adding singles "Head Like a Hole" and "Sin". Rolling Stone's Michael Azerrad described the album as "industrial-strength noise over a pop framework" and "harrowing but catchy music"; Reznor proclaimed this combination "a sincere statement" of "what was in [his] head at the time". In fact, the song "Down in It" spent over two months on Billboard's club-play dance chart. After spending 113 weeks on the Billboard 200, Pretty Hate Machine became one of the first independently released records to attain platinum certification.

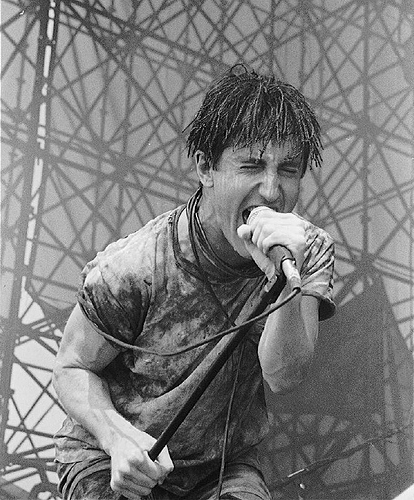
Reznor during the 1991 Lollapalooza festival

Three music videos were created in promotion of the album. MTV aired the videos for "Down in It" and "Head Like a Hole", but an explicit video for "Sin" was only released in partial form for Closure. The original version of the "Down in It" video ended with the implication that Reznor's character had fallen off a building and died in the street. This footage attracted the attention of the FBI.

In 1989, while doing promotion for the album, the band members were asked on what shows they would like to appear. They jokingly replied (possibly while intoxicated) that they would like to appear on Dance Party USA, since it was the most absurd option they could think of at the time. Much to their surprise, they were booked on the show, and made an appearance.

In 1990, Nine Inch Nails began the Pretty Hate Machine Tour Series, in which it toured North America as an opening act for alternative rock artists such as Peter Murphy and the Jesus and Mary Chain. Reznor began smashing his equipment while on stage; Rockbeat interviewer Mike Gitter attributed the live band's early success in front of rock oriented audiences to this aggressive attitude. Nine Inch Nails then embarked on a world tour that continued through the first Lollapalooza festival in 1991.

=== Broken (1992–1993) ===
After a poor European reception opening for Guns N' Roses, the band returned to the US amid pressure from TVT to produce a follow-up to Pretty Hate Machine. After finding out they were hindering control of his project, Reznor criticized the labeling of Nine Inch Nails as a commercially oriented band and demanded his label terminate his contract, but they ignored his plea. In response, Reznor secretly began recording under various pseudonyms to avoid record company interference. Involved in a feud with TVT, he signed a record deal with Interscope Records and created Nothing Records:

We made it very clear we were not doing another record for TVT. But they made it pretty clear they weren't ready to sell. So I felt like, well, I've finally got this thing going but it's dead. Flood and I had to record Broken under a different band name, because if TVT found out we were recording, they could confiscate all our shit and release it. Jimmy Iovine got involved with Interscope, and we kind of got slave-traded. It wasn't my doing. I didn't know anything about Interscope. And I was real pissed off at him at first because it was going from one bad situation to potentially another one. But Interscope went into it like they really wanted to know what I wanted. It was good, after I put my raving lunatic act on.

In 1992, Nine Inch Nails relocated to 10050 Cielo Drive, Benedict Canyon, Los Angeles (renamed "Le Pig" by Reznor), the site of the Tate murders, when Charles Manson's "family" murdered Sharon Tate, wife of noted film director Roman Polanski, and four of her friends. The band used it to record Broken, an extended play (EP) that was the first Nine Inch Nails release distributed by Interscope Records and reached the top 10 on the Billboard 200. In the liner notes, Reznor credited the 1991 Nine Inch Nails touring band as an influence on the EP's sound. He characterized Broken as a guitar-based "blast of destruction", and as "a lot harder ... than Pretty Hate Machine". The inspiration for the harder sound came from the way the live band played during concerts such as Lollapalooza. Songs from Broken earned Nine Inch Nails two Grammy Awards: a performance of the EP's first single "Happiness in Slavery" from Woodstock '94, and the second single "Wish". In reference to receiving the Grammy Award for Best Metal Performance for "Wish", Reznor joked that "Wish" became "the only song to ever win a Grammy that says 'fist fuck' in the lyrics." Against touring of the brand new material, Reznor began living and recording full-time at Le Pig, working on a follow-up free of restrictions from his record label.

Peter Christopherson of the bands Coil and Throbbing Gristle directed a performance video for "Wish", but the EP's most controversial video accompanied "Happiness in Slavery". The video was almost universally banned for its graphic depiction of performance artist Bob Flanagan disrobed and lying on a machine that pleases, tortures, then (apparently) kills him. A third video for "Pinion", partially incorporated into MTV's Alternative Nation opening sequence, showed a toilet that apparently flushes into the mouth of a person in bondage. Reznor and Christopherson compiled the three clips along with footage for "Help Me I Am in Hell" and "Gave Up" into a longform music video titled Broken. It depicts the murder of a young man who is kidnapped and tortured while forced to watch the videos. This footage was never officially released, but instead appeared covertly among tape trading circles. A separate performance video for "Gave Up" featuring Richard Patrick and Marilyn Manson was filmed at Le Pig. A live recording of "Wish" was also filmed, and both videos appeared in Closure.

Broken was followed by the companion remix EP Fixed in late 1992. The only track that was left off the final version of the release is the remix of "Last", produced by Butch Vig (the outro of the "Last" remix is heard in "Throw This Away", which also includes Reznor's remix of "Suck"). The unedited version appeared on the internet as an 8-bit mono 11 kHz file, "NIN_LAST.AIFF", available by FTP from cyberden.com in 1993; it has been removed from the website, but can still be found on p2p networks (Reznor subsequently made it available in higher quality (256 kbit/s mp3) at remix.nin.com). Vig later spoke about his remix while answering questions on a music production forum, saying "I started recording a lot of new parts, and took it in a much different direction. When it was finished, Trent thought the front part of the mix didn't fit the EP, so he just used the ending. I'm glad it's on his website. Duke and Steve worked with me on the remix, in the very early days of Garbage."

=== The Downward Spiral (1993–1997) ===
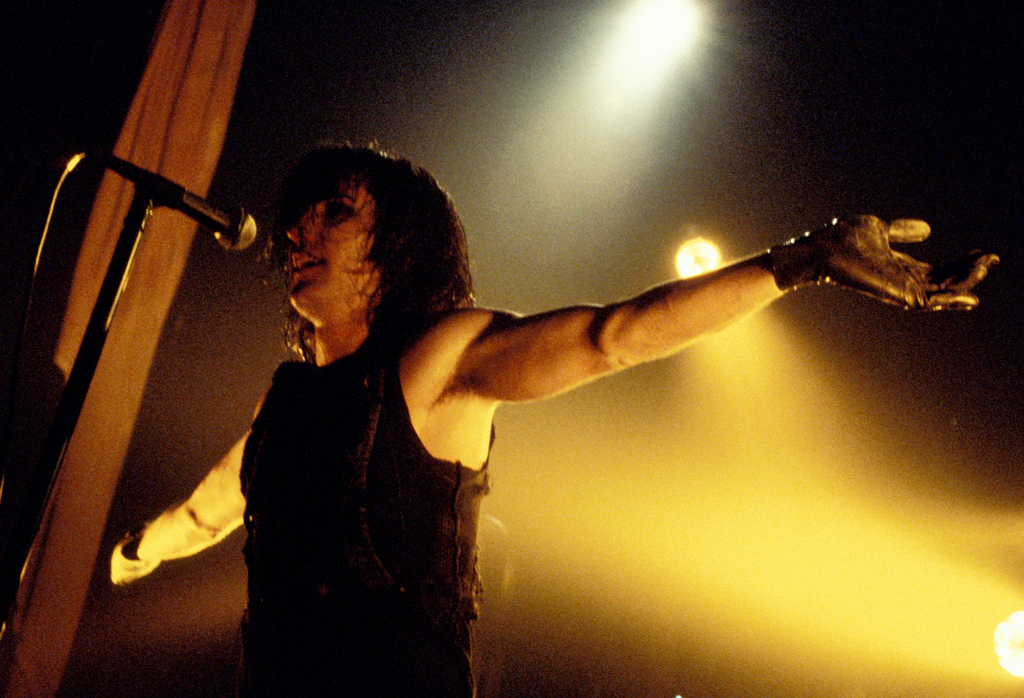
Reznor performing during the Self-Destruct tour, c. 1994–1995

Early ideas for The Downward Spiral arose after the Lollapalooza 1991 festival's concerts ended in September. Reznor elaborated the album's themes into lyrics. Despite initially choosing to record the album in New Orleans, Reznor searched for and moved to 10050 Cielo Drive, in Los Angeles (known as the Manson Murder House) renting it for $11,000 per month from July 4, 1992, the start of the making of both Broken and The Downward Spiral.

Nine Inch Nails' second studio album, The Downward Spiral, entered the Billboard 200 at number two, and is the band's highest seller in the US, over four million copies, among five million worldwide. Influenced by Pink Floyd and by David Bowie's music from the 1970s, The Downward Spiral's diverse textures and moods depict a protagonist's mental progress. Flood co-produced several tracks, while Alan Moulder mixed most, and later found more extensive production duties on future albums. Reznor invited Sean Beavan to work on The Downward Spiral. After contributing to remixes of Nine Inch Nails songs, such as "Closer", Beavan mixed and co-produced Marilyn Manson's Antichrist Superstar in 1996. The Downward Spiral, like Broken, was recorded at Le Pig Studios. "March of the Pigs" and "Closer" were singles. Two other tracks, "Hurt" and "Piggy", though not singles, were issued to radio. Also in 1994, the band released the promotional single "Burn", which Reznor produced, on the soundtrack of Oliver Stone film Natural Born Killers. as well as a cover of the Joy Division song "Dead Souls" on the soundtrack to the film The Crow, which went to number 1 on the Billboard 200 album chart.

The music video for "Closer", directed by Mark Romanek, was in MTV's frequent rotation, although the network, deeming it too graphic, heavily censored the original. The video shows events in a laboratory dealing with religion, sexuality, animal cruelty, politics, and terror; controversial imagery included a nude bald woman with a crucifix mask, a monkey tied to a cross, a pig's head spinning on some type of machine, a diagram of a vulva, Reznor wearing an S&M mask while swinging in shackles, and of him wearing a ball gag. A radio edit that partially mutes the song's explicit lyrics also received extensive airtime.

Contemporary critics generally praised The Downward Spiral, now classed among the most important albums of the 1990s. In 2005, Spin ranked it 25th among the "100 Greatest Albums, 1985–2005". In 2003, Rolling Stone ranked it 200 among "The 500 Greatest Albums of All Time". Blender named it the 80th Greatest American Album. It was ranked No. 488 in the book The Top 500 Heavy Metal Albums of All Time by Martin Popoff. In 2001 Q named The Downward Spiral as one of the 50 Heaviest Albums of All Time; in 2010 the album was ranked No. 102 on their 250 Best Albums of Q's Lifetime (1986–2011) list. After The Downward Spiral's release, Reznor produced an accompanying remix album entitled Further Down the Spiral, the only non-major Nine Inch Nails release to be certified gold in the United States and among the best-selling remix albums of all time. It contained contributions from Coil with Danny Hyde, electronic musician Aphex Twin, producer Rick Rubin, and Jane's Addiction guitarist Dave Navarro, among others.

After The Downward Spiral's 1994 release, the live band supported it by embarking on the Self Destruct Tour. The stage set-up featured dirty curtains, rising and lowering for visuals shown during songs such as "Hurt". The tour debuted the band's grungy, messy image as the members appeared in ragged attire slathered in corn starch. Performances were violent and chaotic, band members often injuring themselves by attacking each other, diving into the crowd, and destroying their instruments to close. The widest mainstream audience was a mud-soaked performance at Woodstock '94, and seen by Pay-Per-View in up to 24 million homes. Enjoying mainstream success thereafter, Nine Inch Nails then performed amid greater production values, adding theatrical visual elements. Supporting acts on tour included the Jim Rose Circus and Marilyn Manson. Released in 1997, the Closure video documented highlights from the tour, including full live videos of "Eraser", "Hurt" and a one-take "March of the Pigs" clip directed by Peter Christopherson. In 1997 Reznor also produced the soundtrack to the David Lynch film Lost Highway, which featured one new Nine Inch Nails song, "The Perfect Drug". Around this time, Reznor's studio perfectionism, struggles with addiction, and bouts of writer's block prolonged the production of The Fragile.

=== The Fragile (1998–2002) ===
Five years elapsed between The Downward Spiral and Nine Inch Nails' next studio album, The Fragile, which arrived as a double album in September 1999. The Fragile was conceived by making "songwriting and arranging and production and sound design ... the same thing. A song would start with a drum loop or a visual and eventually a song would emerge out of it and that was the song." Canadian rock producer Bob Ezrin was consulted on the album's track listing; the liner notes state that he "provided final continuity and flow."

On the heels of the band's previous successes, media anticipation surrounded The Fragile more than a year before its release, when it was already described as "oft-delayed". The album debuted at number one on the Billboard 200, selling 228,000 copies in its first week and receiving generally positive reviews. Spin hailed The Fragile as the "album of the year", whereas Pitchfork Media panned its "melodramatic" lyrics. Nine Inch Nails released three commercial singles from the album in different territories: "The Day the World Went Away" in North America; "We're in This Together" in the EU and Japan (on three separate discs); and "Into the Void" in Australia. Several songs from the album became regulars on alternative rock radio stations, however the album dropped to number 16 and slipped out of the Billboard Top 10 only a week after its release, resulting in the band setting a record for the biggest drop from number one, which has since been broken. Reznor funded the subsequent North American tour out of his own pocket.

Before the album's release, the song "Starfuckers, Inc." provoked media speculation about whom Reznor had intended its acerbic lyrics to satirize. Cinesexuality critic Patricia MacCormack interprets the song as a "scathing attack on the alternative music scene," particularly Reznor's former friend and protégé Marilyn Manson. The two artists put aside their differences when Manson appeared in the song's music video, retitled "Starsuckers, Inc." and performed on stage with Nine Inch Nails at Madison Square Garden in 2000.

Reznor followed The Fragile with another remix album, Things Falling Apart, released in November 2000 to poor reviews, a few months after the 2000 Fragility tour which itself was recorded and released on CD, DVD, and VHS in 2002 as And All That Could Have Been. A deluxe edition of the live CD came with the companion disc Still, containing stripped-down versions of songs from the Nine Inch Nails catalog along with several new pieces of music.

During the Fragility 2.0 tour, Reznor suffered a heroin overdose in London in June 2000, forcing a gig which was to be played that night to be cancelled. The incident pushed Reznor into entering rehab, putting Nine Inch Nails on hold while he attempted to become sober.

In 2002, Johnny Cash covered the Nine Inch Nails' "Hurt" for his album, American IV: The Man Comes Around, to critical acclaim. After seeing the music video, which later won a Grammy, Reznor himself became a fan of the rendition:

I pop the video in, and wow ... Tears welling, silence, goose-bumps ... Wow. [I felt like] I just lost my girlfriend, because that song isn't mine anymore ... It really made me think about how powerful music is as a medium and art form. I wrote some words and music in my bedroom as a way of staying sane, about a bleak and desperate place I was in, totally isolated and alone. [Somehow] that winds up reinterpreted by a music legend from a radically different era/genre and still retains sincerity and meaning—different, but every bit as pure.

=== With Teeth (2004–2006) ===
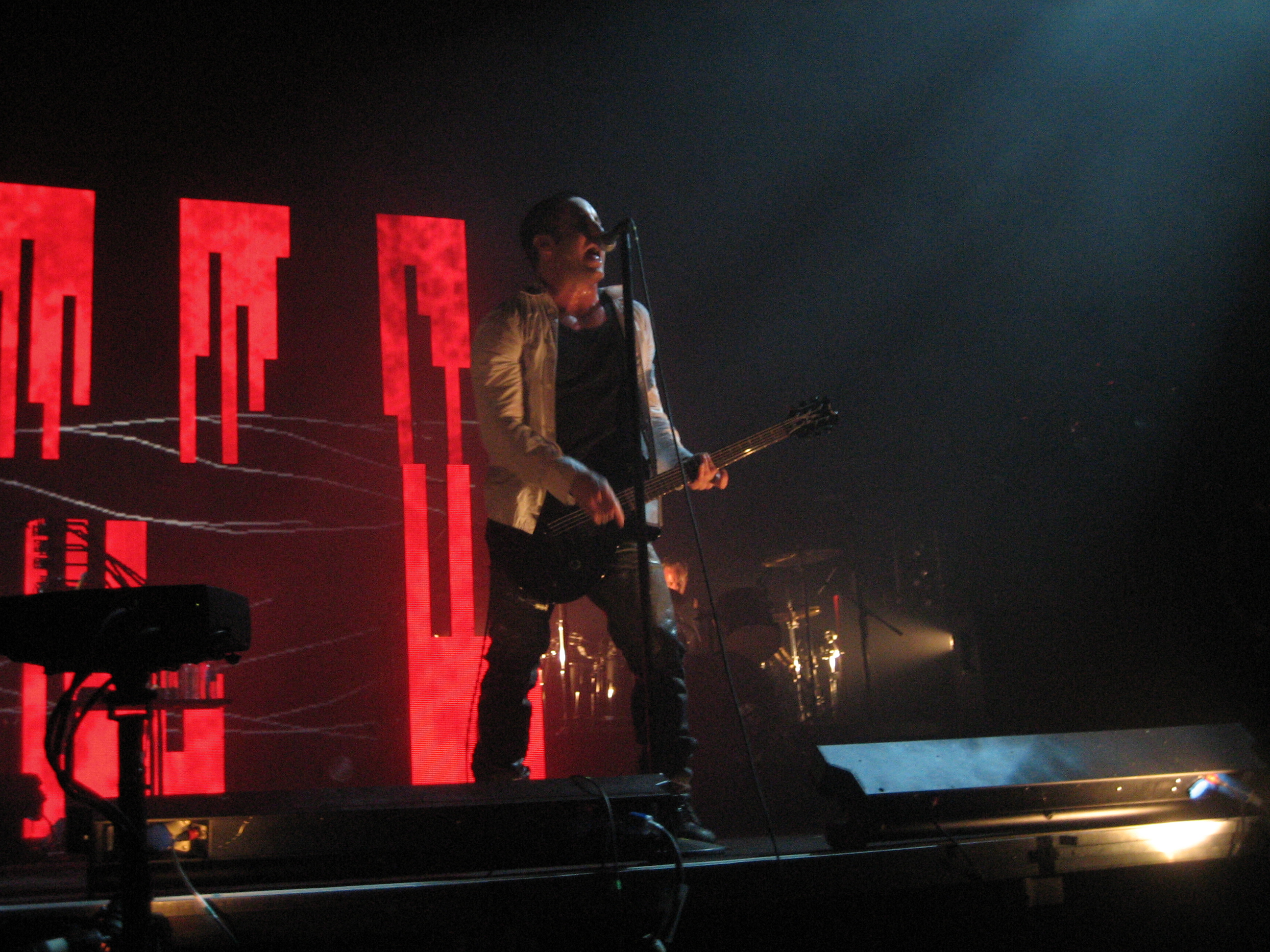
Live performance during the Live: With Teeth tour in 2006

A further six years elapsed before Nine Inch Nails' fourth full-length album. With Teeth was released in May 2005, though it was leaked prior to its official release date. The album was written and recorded throughout 2004 following Reznor's battle with alcoholism and substance abuse and legal issues with his former manager, John Malm Jr. With Teeth debuted on top of the Billboard 200, Nine Inch Nails' second reign at number one with an album. The album's package lacks typical liner notes; instead it simply lists the names of songs and co-producers, and the URL for an online PDF poster with lyrics and full credits. The entire album was made available in streaming audio on the band's official MySpace page in advance of its release date. Critical reception of the album was mostly positive: Rolling Stone's Rob Sheffield described the album as "vintage Nine Inch Nails". PopMatters condemned the album, claiming Reznor "ran out of ideas."

I think, fundamentally, music is something inherently people love and need and relate to, and a lot of what's out right now feels like McDonalds. It's quick-fix. You kind of have a stomachache afterwards.

— Trent Reznor, Salt Lake Tribune interview (2005)

A music video for the song "The Hand That Feeds" premiered on the Nine Inch Nails official website in March 2005. Reznor released the source files for it in GarageBand format a month later, allowing fans to remix the song. He similarly released files for the album's second single "Only" in a wider range of formats, including Pro Tools and ACID Pro. David Fincher directed a video for "Only" with primarily computer-generated imagery. The planned music video for its third single, "Every Day Is Exactly the Same", was directed by Francis Lawrence but reportedly scrapped in the post-production stage. All three singles topped the Billboard Alternative Songs chart.

Nine Inch Nails launched a North American arena tour in Autumn 2005, supported by Queens of the Stone Age, Autolux and Death from Above 1979. Another opening act on the tour, hip-hop artist Saul Williams, performed on stage with Nine Inch Nails at the Voodoo Music Experience festival during a headlining appearance in hurricane-stricken New Orleans, Reznor's former home. The Nine Inch Nails live band completed a tour of North American amphitheaters in the summer of 2006, joined by Bauhaus, TV on the Radio, and Peaches. The Beside You in Time tour documentary was released in February 2007 via three formats: DVD, HD DVD and Blu-ray Disc. The home video release debuted at number one on both the Billboard Top Music Videos and Billboard Comprehensive Music Videos charts in the United States.

=== Year Zero (2007–2008) ===
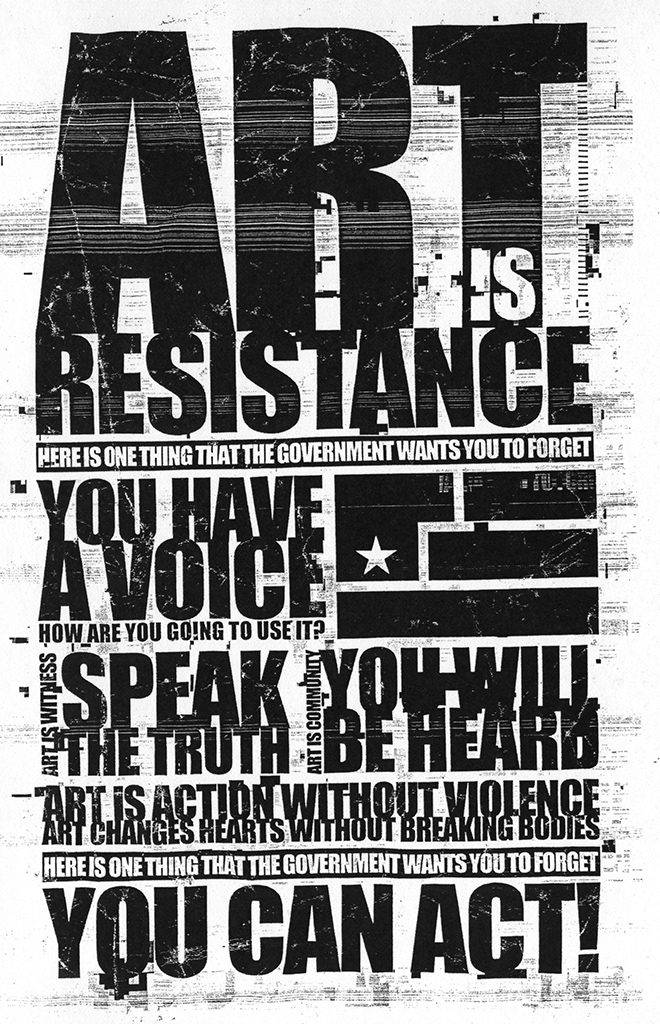
An Art is Resistance flyer from the Year Zero alternate reality game

Nine Inch Nails' fifth studio album, Year Zero, was released on April 17, 2007, only two years after With Teeth, a marked change in the slow pace from the release of previous albums. With lyrics written from the perspective of multiple fictitious characters, Year Zero is a concept album criticizing the United States government's policies and their effect on the world fifteen years in the future. Critical response to the album was generally favorable, with an average rating of 76% on Metacritic.

The story takes place in the United States in 2022, which has been termed "Year 0", by the government, being the year America was reborn. It had suffered several major terrorist attacks, apparently by Islamic fundamentalists, including attacks on Los Angeles and Seattle, and in response, the government seized absolute control of the country. The government is a Christian fundamentalist theocracy, maintaining control of the populace through institutions like the Bureau of Morality and the First Evangelical Church of Plano. The government corporation Cedocore distributes the drug Parepin through the water supply, making Americans who drink water apathetic and carefree. There are several underground rebel groups, mainly operating online, most notably Art is Resistance and Solutions Backwards Initiative. In response to the increasing oppression of the government, several corporate, government, and subversive websites were transported back in time to the present by a group of scientists working clandestinely against the authorities. The websites-from-the-future were sent to the year 2007 to warn American people of the impending dystopian future and to prevent it from ever forming in the first place.

An alternate reality game emerged parallel to the Year Zero concept, expanding upon its storyline. Clues hidden on tour merchandise initially led fans to discover a network of fictitious, in-game websites that describe an "Orwellian picture of the United States circa the year 2022". Before Year Zero's release, unreleased songs from the album were found on USB drives hidden at Nine Inch Nails concert venues in Lisbon and Barcelona, as part of the alternate reality game. Fan participation in the alternate reality game caught the attention of media outlets such as USA Today and Billboard, who have cited fan-site The NIN Hotline, forum Echoing the Sound, fan club The Spiral, and NinWiki as sources for new discoveries.

The album's first single, "Survivalism", and other tracks from Year Zero were released as multitrack audio files for fans to remix. A remix album titled Year Zero Remixed was later released, containing remixes from Year Zero by other artists. The remix album was Nine Inch Nails' final release on a major record label for over five years, as the act had completed its contractual obligation to Interscope Records and did not renew its contract. The remix album was accompanied by an interactive remix site with multitrack downloads and the ability to post remixes.

Reznor planned a film adaption of the album and noted Year Zero as "part of a bigger picture of a number of things I'm working on. Essentially, I wrote the soundtrack to a movie that doesn't exist." The project moved into the television medium because of high costs for Year Zero as a film, then Reznor found American film producer Lawrence Bender and met with writers. On August 10, 2007, Reznor announced that they would be taking the concept to television networks in an attempt to secure a deal: "We're about to pitch it to the network, so we're a couple of weeks away from meeting all of the main people, and we'll see what happens." Since first announcing his plans for a television series, progress slowed, reportedly due to the 2007–2008 Writer's Guild strike, but it nevertheless continued. In 2010, the resultant miniseries, also named Year Zero, was reported to be in development with HBO and BBC Worldwide Productions, with the screenplay and script written by Reznor and Carnivàle writer Daniel Knauf, but at the end of 2012 Reznor said that the project was "in a holding state".

=== Ghosts I–IV and The Slip (2008–2012) ===
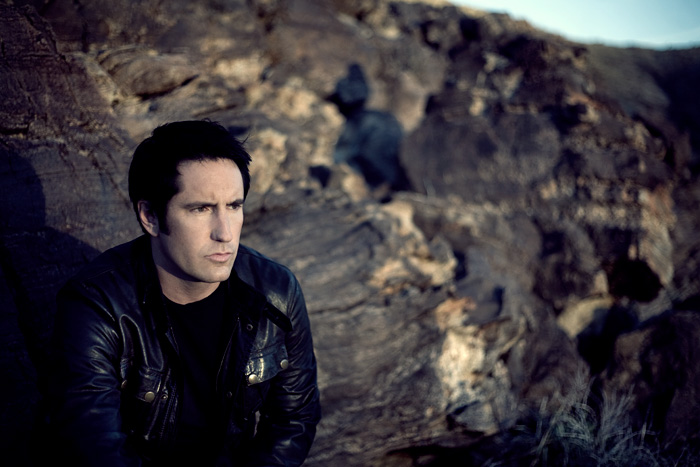
Reznor in 2008

In February 2008, Reznor posted a news update on the Nine Inch Nails website entitled "2 weeks". On March 2, Ghosts I–IV (the first release on The Null Corporation label), a 36-track instrumental album, became available via the band's official website. Ghosts I–IV was made available in a number of different formats and forms, ranging from a free download of the first volume, to a $300 Ultra-Deluxe limited edition package. All 2,500 copies of the $300 package sold out in three days. The album is licensed under a Creative Commons Attribution Non-Commercial Share Alike licence. The album was created improvisationally over a ten-week period and contributors included Atticus Ross, Alan Moulder, Alessandro Cortini, Adrian Belew, and Brian Viglione.

Similar to the announcement that ultimately led to the release of Ghosts I–IV, a post on the band's website in April 2008 read "2 weeks!" On May 5, Nine Inch Nails released The Slip via its website without any advertisement or promotion. The album was made available for download free of charge with a message from Reznor, "this one's on me," protected under the same Creative Commons licence as Ghosts, and has seen individual downloads surpassing 1.4 million. The Slip has since been released on CD as a limited edition set of 250,000.

Following the release of Ghosts I–IV and The Slip, a 25-date tour titled Lights in the Sky, was announced in several North American cities, and was later expanded to include several more North American dates as well as dates in South America. Cortini and Josh Freese returned as members from the previous tour, while Robin Finck rejoined the band and Justin Meldal-Johnsen was added on bass guitar. Freese and Cortini left the live band, but it became a quartet with the addition of Ilan Rubin on drums.

On January 7, 2009, Reznor uploaded unedited HD-quality footage from three shows as a download of over 400 GB via BitTorrent. In an immediate response, a fan organization known as This One Is On Us quickly downloaded the data and had begun to assemble the footage alongside its own video recordings to create a professional three-part digital film, followed by a physical release created "by fans for fans". This tour documentary became collectively known as Another Version of the Truth and was released throughout late December 2009 to February 2010 via three formats: DVD, Blu-ray Disc and BitTorrent. To date, the group and the project has received significant attention from media outlets such as USA Today, Rolling Stone, Techdirt and Pitchfork TV, and holds the support of both Reznor and the fan community with theatrical screenings being held all over the world. Nine Inch Nails art director and webmaster Rob Sheridan noted on the band's official website:

This is yet another example of a devoted fanbase and a policy of openness combining to fill in blanks left by old media barriers. The entire NIN camp is absolutely thrilled that treating our fans with respect and nurturing their creativity has led to such an overwhelming outpour of incredible content, and that we now have such a high quality souvenir from our most ambitious tour ever.

Nine Inch Nails Revenge, an iPhone/iPod Touch-exclusive rhythm game developed by Tapulous, was released on March 8, 2009 (five months after the company announced the development of the game). This installment in the Tap Tap video game franchise was themed after Nine Inch Nails, and included tracks from Ghosts I–IV and The Slip. Portions of the album Ghosts I-IV were also used in making of the soundtrack for the documentary Citizenfour.

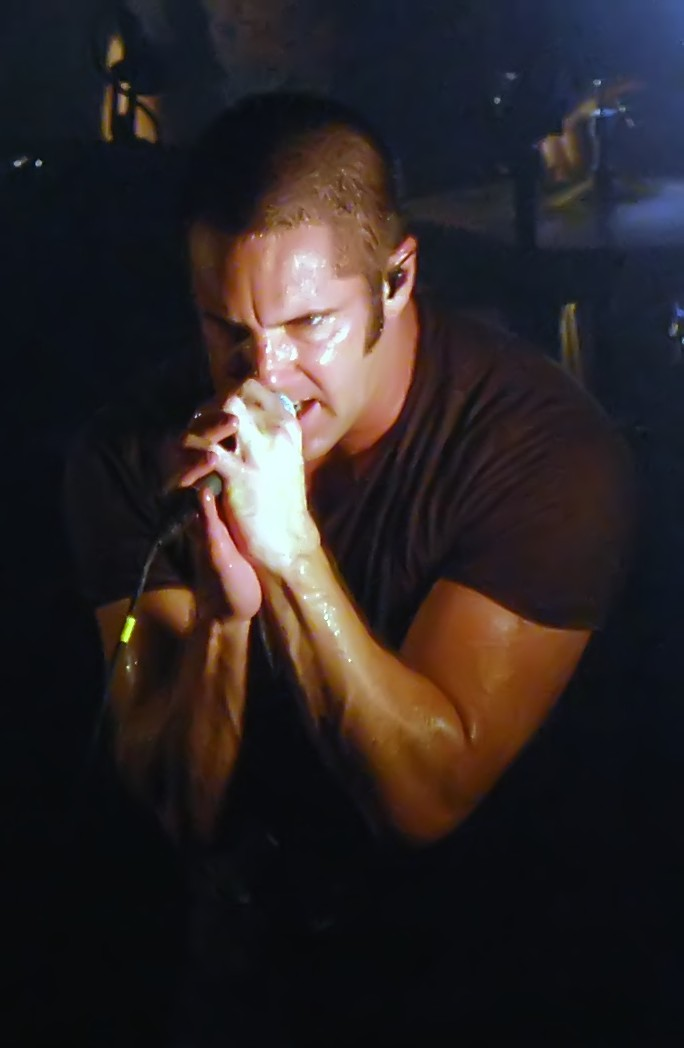
Reznor performing at the Music Box in Hollywood on September 8, 2009

In February 2009, Reznor posted his thoughts about the future of Nine Inch Nails on his official website, stating that "I've been thinking for some time now it's time to make NIN disappear for a while." Reznor since clarified that he "isn't done creating music under the moniker, but that Nine Inch Nails is done touring for the foreseeable future." The "Wave Goodbye" tour concluded on September 10, 2009, at the Wiltern Theater in Los Angeles. Reznor subsequently released two tracks under the Nine Inch Nails moniker: the theme song for the film Tetsuo: The Bullet Man, and a cover of U2's "Zoo Station", included in the Achtung Baby tribute album AHK-toong BAY-bi Covered.

In 2009 Reznor married Mariqueen Maandig, and formed a project with Maandig and Atticus Ross dubbed How to Destroy Angels. Its first release, a six-track self-titled EP, was made available for free download in June 2010. Reznor's next collaboration with Ross was co-writing and producing the official score for David Fincher's 2010 film, The Social Network. Reznor and Ross received two awards for the score, a 2010 Golden Globe Award for Best Original Score for a Motion Picture, and a 2010 Oscar for Best Original Score. Reznor and Ross again collaborated with Fincher for the official score the American adaptation of the novel The Girl with the Dragon Tattoo, released in December 2011, and then again on Fincher's 2014 film Gone Girl.

In July 2012 Reznor teamed up with video game developer Treyarch to compose the theme music for Call of Duty: Black Ops II. Later that year Reznor again worked with Atticus Ross along with Alessandro Cortini on a remix of the song "Destroyer" by Telepathe. Reznor also appeared in a documentary called "Sound City" directed by Dave Grohl, in addition to co-writing and performing the song "Mantra" with Grohl and Josh Homme. This led to further collaboration with Reznor and Homme on the 2013 album from Queens of the Stone Age titled ...Like Clockwork. Reznor contributed vocals and drum programing to the song "Kalopsia" and vocals on "Fairweather Friends" along with Elton John on piano and vocals. In October a project with Dr. Dre and Beats Electronics was announced that Reznor wrote was "probably not what you're expecting [from me]". The project was named "Daisy"; a digital music service was announced in January 2013. It was until January 2014 that the service was fully launched, with Reznor serving as chief creative officer.

=== Hesitation Marks (2012–2014) ===
In an interview with BBC Radio 1, Reznor indicated that he would be writing for the majority of 2012 with Nine Inch Nails "in mind". Reznor eventually confirmed that he was working on new Nine Inch Nails material and might be performing live again. In February 2013, Reznor announced the return of Nine Inch Nails and revealed the Twenty Thirteen Tour. He also revealed that the new lineup of the band would include Eric Avery of Jane's Addiction, Adrian Belew of King Crimson, and Josh Eustis of Telefon Tel Aviv, as well as returning members Alessandro Cortini and Ilan Rubin. However, both Avery and Belew would quit the touring band before performances commenced, with former member Robin Finck returning in their place.

By May 28 a new Nine Inch Nails album was complete. Released September 3, Hesitation Marks incorporated rhythms reminiscent of earlier releases, but was more expansive and theatrical. In addition to the recently departed Adrian Belew, Reznor employed bassist Pino Palladino along with Todd Rundgren and Fleetwood Mac's Lindsey Buckingham to achieve various art-rock elements.

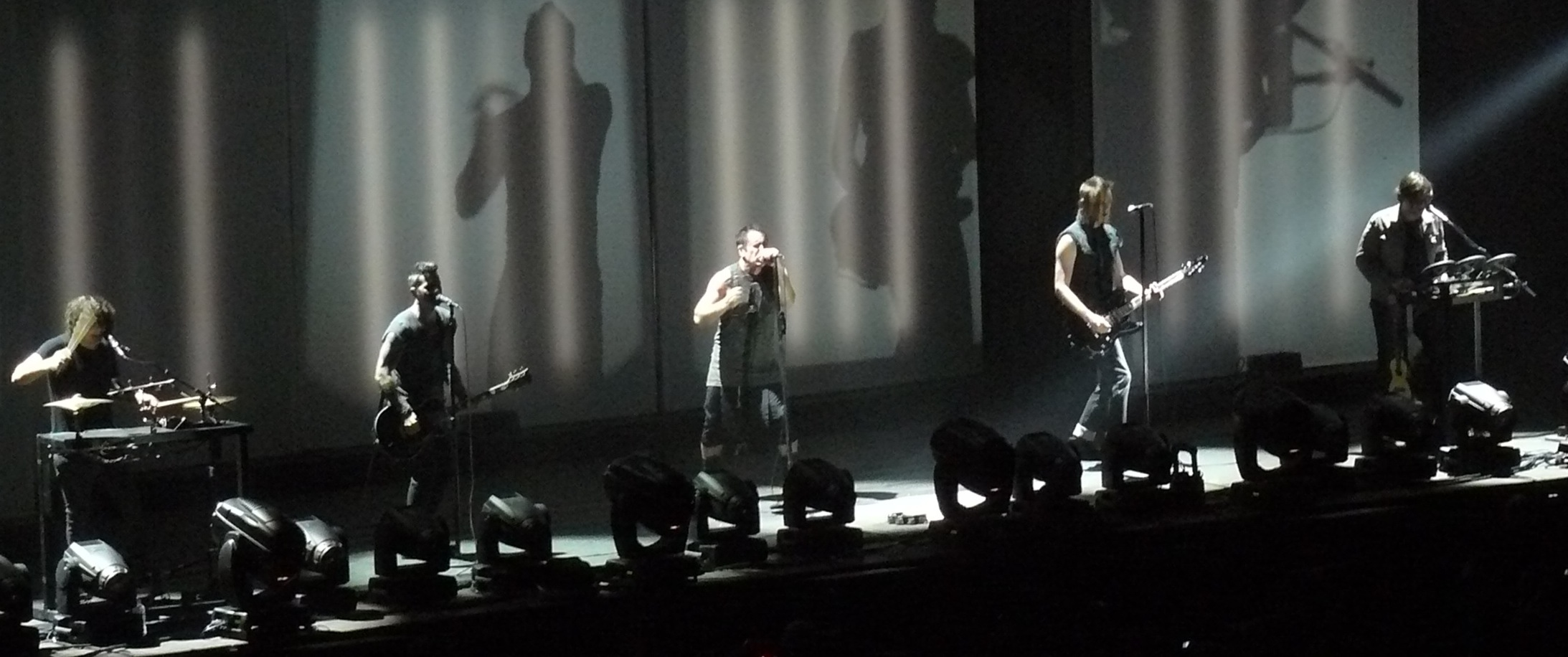
The band performing at Mediolanum Forum in Milan in 2013, (from left to right): drummer Ilan Rubin, bassist Joshua Eustis, singer Trent Reznor, guitarist Robin Finck and keyboardist Alessandro Cortini.

The album produced three singles, all released prior to that of the album itself. "Came Back Haunted" was released on June 6, with an accompanying music video bearing an epileptic seizure warning. The second single, "Copy of A", was released on August 12 free of charge to US and UK Amazon.com account holders. "Everything" was the third and final single, recorded during sessions for the Nine Inch Nails greatest hits album. The sessions gave way to more songs that ended up yielding the entire album.

In July the Twenty Thirteen Tour was underway, beginning with a slew of festival appearances that included the Fuji Rock Festival, and the Pukkelpop, Hockenheim, Germany's Rock'n'Heim and the Reading and Leeds festivals in August. The Tension 2013 North American leg of the tour ran from September to November and added Palladino, Lisa Fischer and Sharlotte Gibson to the lineup with Godspeed You! Black Emperor and Explosions in the Sky as opening acts. This leg of the tour was documented and released in the spring as Nine Inch Nails Tension 2013.

In 2014 the band extended its tour worldwide as a four-piece. The new lineup included previous collaborators, Ilan Rubin, Alessandro Cortini, and Robin Finck. The band was joined by Queens of the Stone Age for the Australia and New Zealand tour, during which a nightly coin toss determined who opened. The tour closed in Europe with supporting synth-pop act Cold Cave. After a month-long break, Nine Inch Nails again hit the road on a joint tour with Soundgarden. The 23-day journey extended throughout the continental US, with experimental hip-hop group Death Grips scheduled to open most of the shows. Two weeks prior to the tour, Death Grips announced its breakup and cancelled all subsequent live shows. Oneohtrix Point Never, the Dillinger Escape Plan and Cold Cave each replaced Death Grips separately for the tour.

In 2014, its first year of eligibility, Nine Inch Nails was nominated for induction into the Rock and Roll Hall of Fame with 14 other candidates. While they were not inducted that year, the band placed second in the 2015 Rock and Roll Hall of Fame Nominees Fan Vote. In 2015, Nine Inch Nails was once again nominated for the Rock and Roll Hall of Fame. However, they once again did not get inducted.

In June 2015, Nine Inch Nails released instrumental versions of The Fragile and With Teeth to stream exclusively on Apple Music, a service of which Reznor is chief creative director. In an interview promoting the service, Reznor mentioned he has started "messing around with some things" in regards to a new Nine Inch Nails album, stating "It's not a record I'm trying to finish in a month. It's more just feeling around in the dark and seeing what sounds interesting". In December 2015, Reznor reported that "Nine Inch Nails will return in 2016".

=== The Trilogy (Not the Actual Events / Add Violence / Bad Witch) (2016–2019) ===
In October 2016, in response to a fan's question about the lack of new Nine Inch Nails music, Reznor responded with "2016 is not over yet". In December 2016, Reznor commented on his statement regarding Nine Inch Nails' return by the end of the year: "Those words did come out of my mouth, didn't they? ... Just wait and see what happens." Three days later, Reznor announced an EP titled Not the Actual Events, along with reissues of Broken, The Downward Spiral, and The Fragile, with subsequent reissues of With Teeth, Year Zero, and The Slip to be released later in 2017, these plans however fell through. Also announced was The Fragile: Deviations 1, which comprised 37 instrumental, alternate and unreleased tracks, many of which have never been heard before anywhere. Not the Actual Events was released on December 23, 2016, with fans who pre-ordered it receiving their download links one day earlier. Atticus Ross was also revealed to be an official full-time member of the band, the first member other than Reznor to be added to the band.

In early 2017, the band announced three headlining festival dates in North America. In January 2017, the band announced that it would be performing at the Panorama Music Festival in New York on July 30. On March 21, the band announced on their official Facebook page that it would be headlining Day 3 of FYF Fest in Los Angeles on July 23. In the same post, the band also announced their 2017 touring lineup, which included Reznor and Ross joined by the band's 2014 touring lineup, Robin Finck, Alessandro Cortini, and Ilan Rubin. The band appeared in Part 8 of the third season of Twin Peaks, performing their song, "She's Gone Away".

In June 2017, in an email that was issued out to customers waiting on delayed vinyl orders, Reznor confirmed that Not the Actual Events would actually make up the first part of a trilogy of EPs, with the second installment Add Violence being released on July 21 and the third and final EP of the trilogy to follow in 2018. The single "Less Than" was released a week prior to the second EP's release.

Also in 2017, the pair were tasked to score the upcoming Ken Burns series The Vietnam War, and provide both original music and a compilation soundtrack of popular songs. Their score, which was released on September 15, 2017, included original compositions, and it also includes reworked pieces from other Nine Inch Nails songs and their award-winning scores for The Social Network and The Girl with the Dragon Tattoo.

The band released their ninth studio album, Bad Witch, on June 22, 2018. The band also announced the "Cold and Black and Infinite 2018 North America Tour", where it toured with the Jesus and Mary Chain. To prevent ticket scalping, the band took the unusual step of only selling physical tickets that had to be purchased at the venue prior to the shows. Reznor stated of the decision, "The promise of a world made better by computers and online connectivity has failed us in many ways, particularly when it comes to ticketing. Everything about the process sucks and everyone loses except the reseller. We've decided to try something different that will also likely suck, but in a different way."

In October 2019, Nine Inch Nails was again nominated for induction into the Rock & Roll Hall of Fame.

=== Ghosts V–VI (2020–2022) ===
On January 15, 2020, Nine Inch Nails was officially named as members of the Class of 2020 for induction into the Rock & Roll Hall of Fame. However, due to the onset of the COVID-19 pandemic in the United States, the induction ceremony was postponed indefinitely. Originally, only Trent Reznor was to be inducted as the sole full-time member of the group for most of its history. After holding discussions with the Rock & Roll Hall of Fame, Reznor announced that former live band members Chris Vrenna and Danny Lohner, as well as current members Alessandro Cortini, Ilan Rubin (the youngest person ever inducted into the Hall of Fame), longtime guitarist Robin Finck, and the only other full time member of the band, Atticus Ross, would all be inducted as members of Nine Inch Nails.

On March 26, 2020, Nine Inch Nails released Ghosts V: Together and Ghosts VI: Locusts, its tenth and eleventh studio albums and the sequels to their 2008 instrumental album Ghosts I–IV. The albums were released for free as a show of solidarity with the band's fans during the COVID-19 pandemic.

Due to the pandemic, the live induction ceremony for the 2020 Hall of Fame Induction was cancelled on July 15, 2020, and simultaneously, an induction special was announced to be broadcast and available for streaming through HBO and HBO Max, respectively, on November 7, 2020. In the interim, a special display was created to represent Nine Inch Nails' presence in the Hall of Fame that celebrated their popular, muddy performance at Woodstock '94; opened on the 26th anniversary of the concert. On November 6, 2020, Trent Reznor and the other to-be-inducted members of Nine Inch Nails were interviewed by journalist David Farrier about the history of the band and their feelings on being inducted. Then on November 7, Nine Inch Nails was formally inducted into the Rock & Roll Hall of Fame, Class of 2020, by punk icon Iggy Pop. Reznor thanked the fans, his family, and all of his many Nine Inch Nails collaborators in his acceptance speech, recorded from his home in Beverly Hills, CA.

On May 6, 2021, Nine Inch Nails released a new track, "Isn't Everyone" in collaboration with noise rock group HEALTH, who had previously been an opening act on their Lights In The Sky and Wave Goodbye tours. On May 7, they announced they would be playing two shows in Cleveland (September 21 and 23, 2021) with the Pixies to commemorate their inauguration into the Rock and Roll Hall of Fame, which, according to the band, would be "the only NIN headline shows in 2021". Those shows were cancelled on August 19, 2021, due to rising COVID-19 cases in the United States. Also in 2021, Reznor and Ross produced Halsey's album If I Can't Have Love, I Want Power. It was later nominated for the Best Alternative Music Album award at the 64th Annual Grammy Awards.

In February 2022, Nine Inch Nails announced a short tour of the United States for 2022, the group's first performances in nearly four years. A tour of the United Kingdom was announced shortly afterwards.

On September 24, 2022, Nine Inch Nails performed in their native Cleveland for the first time since 2013 after a "Nine Inch Nails Fan Day" at the Rock & Roll Hall of Fame the previous day. Over the course of the performance, all the other six inductees, as well as former members Richard Patrick and Charlie Clouser, joined Reznor on stage and even covered Patrick's Filter hit, "Hey Man Nice Shot". Reznor posted on his Discord after the show, "When/If we tour again, it will be different. Not like [2018′s "Cold Black Infinite" tour] era – It's over."

=== Tron: Ares, Peel It Back Tour and Nine Inch Noize (2024–present) ===
On April 4, 2024, Nine Inch Nails revealed plans to create a project with Epic Games that they described as "something that is not exactly a video game, in the UEFN ecosystem Epic has built around Fortnite", to develop a TV series with Christopher Storer, and create a film with Mike Flanagan. The projects were being created from a newly established multimedia company With Teeth, run in partnership with the band's art director John Crawford and producer Jonathan Pavesi. The band is also working on a short film with artist Susanne Deeken, a clothing line called Memory Fade, as well as a music festival and a new record label set to launch alongside it.

On August 10, 2024, Reznor and Ross appeared at Disney's D23 fan event to announce Nine Inch Nails was producing the film score for Tron: Ares. It was reported that the soundtrack would feature "new original songs" by the band. Previously, soundtracks were credited to simply Ross and Reznor, whereas the score for Tron: Ares specifically credited the Nine Inch Nails entity.

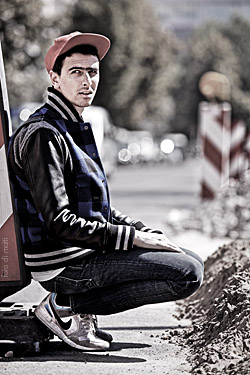
In 2025, Reznor collaborated with German musician Boys Noize to make the project Nine Inch Noize

Plans for a tour titled Peel It Back leaked on January 13, 2025. Details indicated August and September shows in the United States, Canada, and Europe, as well as a Facebook post for a September 10 event in Tampa, Florida, and an associated Ticketmaster listing. On January 14, the band confirmed they were touring, with further details to follow, but their announcement was paused due to the ongoing Los Angeles wildfires. The band later announced the summer tour on January 22.

On July 17, 2025, the band released "As Alive as You Need Me to Be" as the lead single from the Tron: Ares soundtrack. The song would later be nominated for Best Rock Song and Best Song Written for Visual Media at the 68th Annual Grammy Awards. On July 30, the band announced that Freese would rejoin the touring lineup after Rubin's departure to join the Foo Fighters, who had released Freese earlier that year. This marked the band's first lineup change in nine years, the longest timespan to date.

On September 16, 2025, it was announced that Nine Inch Nails and Boys Noize would perform at Coachella 2026 as a supergroup called Nine Inch Noize. Boys Noize had previously opened for the Peel It Back Tour, and would join the band on stage during the third act of every performance, with the Coachella performances acting as an extension of the third act. On October 1, a second North American leg of the Peel It Back Tour was revealed, scheduled for February and March 2026. For the tour, Stu Brooks was brought in as the band's primary bassist, as Cortini had quietly left Nine Inch Nails shortly after the first leg of the Peel It Back Tour. On February 27, 2026, Nine Inch Nails released the remix album Tron Ares: Divergence, featuring previously unreleased material from the Tron: Ares score, along with remixes from Arca, Mark Pritchard, Boys Noize, Lanark Artefax, Chilly Gonzales, Danny L Harle, Jack Dangers, Pixel Grip, Working Men's Club, The Dare, and Schwefelgelband.

Nine Inch Noize was released on April 17, 2026, as Halo 38 in the halo numbering system. The record was first announced on April 8, being advertised by a billboard on the way to Coachella in Indio, California. Reznor stated there won't be any further Nine Inch Noize tours following Coachella "anytime soon", and he will be back to working on Nine Inch Nails material.

== Artistry ==
=== Musical style ===
Nine Inch Nails has been labeled as industrial rock, electronic rock, industrial, industrial metal, alternative metal, alternative rock, electro-industrial, and industrial dance. AllMusic's Steve Huey states that "Nine Inch Nails were the most popular industrial group ever and were largely responsible for bringing the music to a mass audience". Reznor has never referred to his own work as industrial music, but admits to borrowing techniques from such early industrial bands as Throbbing Gristle and Test Dept. Despite the disparity between those artists initially operating under the term "industrial" and Nine Inch Nails, it has become common in journalistic descriptions of Reznor's body of work to describe it as such. Reznor acknowledged in Spin magazine that "Down in It" was influenced by early Skinny Puppy, particularly the band's song "Dig It"; other songs from Pretty Hate Machine and With Teeth have been described as synth-pop. Reviewing The Fragile, critic Steve Cooper noted that the album juxtaposes widely varied genres, such as solo piano in "The Frail" and drum and bass elements in "Starfuckers, Inc." Ambient music has been featured in some of Nine Inch Nails' music, including on Ghosts I–IV (which is specifically dark ambient), Hesitation Marks, The Downward Spiral, The Slip, and The Fragile.

"The Day the World Went Away"

"Closer"

"The Great Destroyer"

Songs such as "Wish" and "The Day the World Went Away" exhibit terraced dynamics. Reznor's singing follows a similar pattern, frequently moving from whispers to screams. He also has used software to alter his voice in several songs, as evident in "Starfuckers, Inc." and "Burn". The band's music also occasionally contains complex time signatures, notably in "The Collector" from With Teeth and concert favorite "March of the Pigs". Reznor uses noise and distortion in his song arrangements and incorporates dissonance with chromatic melody and/or harmony. These techniques are all used in the song "Hurt", which contains a highly dissonant tritone played on guitar during the verses, a B5#11, emphasized when Reznor sings the eleventh note on the word "I" every time the B/E# dyad is played. "Closer" concludes with a chromatic piano motif: the melody is debuted during the second verse of "Piggy" on organ, then reappears in power chords at drop D tuning throughout the chorus of "Heresy", while an inverted (ascending) version is used throughout "A Warm Place", and then recurs in its original state for the final time on "The Downward Spiral".

On The Fragile, Reznor revisits the technique of repeating a motif multiple times throughout different songs, either on a different musical instrument with a transposed harmony or in an altered tempo. Many of the songs on Year Zero contain an extended instrumental ending, which encompasses the entire second half of the three-minute long "The Great Destroyer". AllMusic's review described the album's laptop-mixed sound: "Guitars squall against glitches, beeps, pops, and blotches of blurry sonic attacks. Percussion looms large, distorted, organic, looped, screwed, spindled and broken."

=== Lyrical themes ===
Lyrical themes found in Nine Inch Nails songs are largely concerned with dark explorations of the self ranging from religion, greed, fame, lust, addiction, self-deception, aging, regret, and nihilism. Occasionally, the lyrics depart from their introspective nature to deal with a topic like politics, which is the focus of Year Zero. Three Nine Inch Nails albums are concept albums: The Downward Spiral, The Fragile, and Year Zero. The album With Teeth was originally set to be a concept album about an endless dream occurring in reality, but Reznor eventually took this idea out of the record.

=== Influences ===
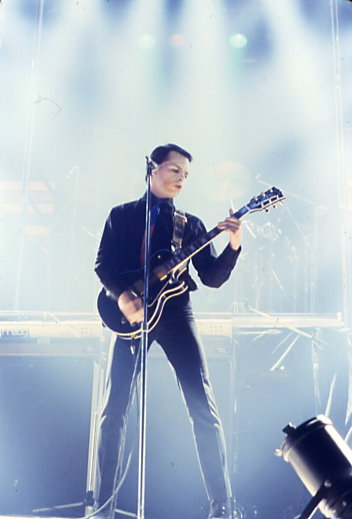
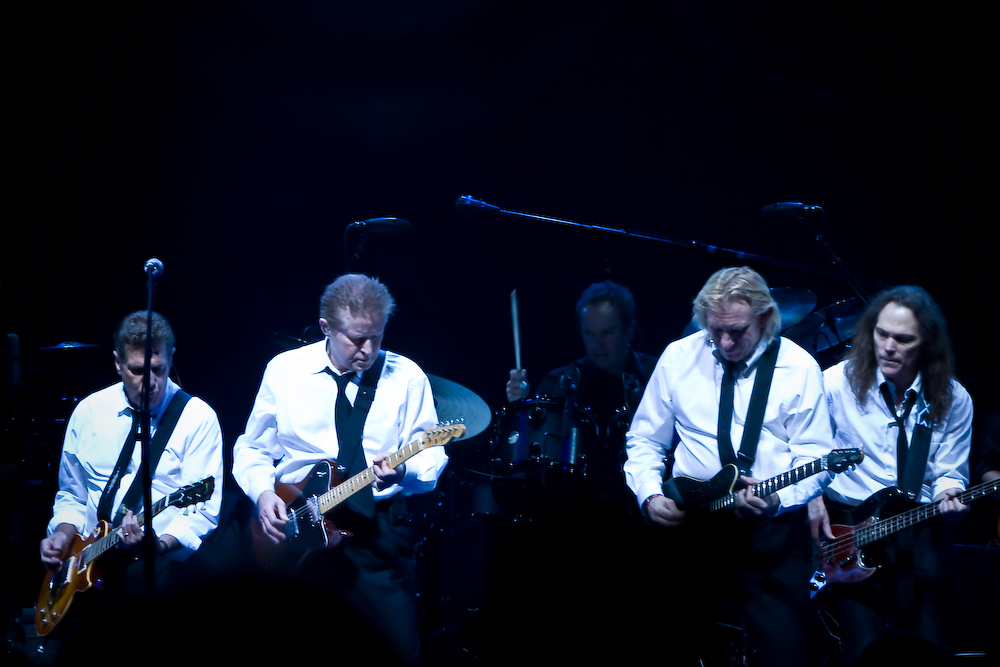
Gary Numan and the Eagles are among Nine Inch Nails' early influences.

Reznor's earliest childhood influence was the Eagles, whom he has cited as inspiring him to form a band. He would later recall, "The first concert I ever saw was the Eagles in 1976. The excitement of the night struck a chord with me and I remember thinking, 'Someday I'd love to be up on that stage.'" Upon forming Nine Inch Nails, Reznor stated that he was initially influenced most by the Clash, even outright trying to imitate them. Another major inspiration for the band is Gary Numan; Reznor has said that "after hearing 'Cars' I knew I wanted to make music with synthesizers". Other influences include Ministry and Skinny Puppy, which helped shape 1989's Pretty Hate Machine. The album's liner notes also paid tribute to Public Enemy and Prince. The 2005 single "Only" exemplifies the disco-style beats and synthesizers drawn from Numan's persuasion. Other artists of significance to Nine Inch Nails include acts such as Depeche Mode, Queen, King Crimson, Devo, the Cure, Joy Division, Bauhaus, Adam Ant, Coil, and Soft Cell. Reznor and Vrenna saw Jane's Addiction in 1988 during the making of Pretty Hate Machine and were influenced by the live presentation and raw rock sound of the band.

Reznor has toured with some of his influences, including a brief tour opening for Skinny Puppy in 1988. In 1995, Nine Inch Nails went on tour with David Bowie, who, along with Pink Floyd, had been a significant influence on The Downward Spiral. In 2006, Nine Inch Nails went on tour with Bauhaus, on their Summer Amphitheatre Tour.

== Legacy ==
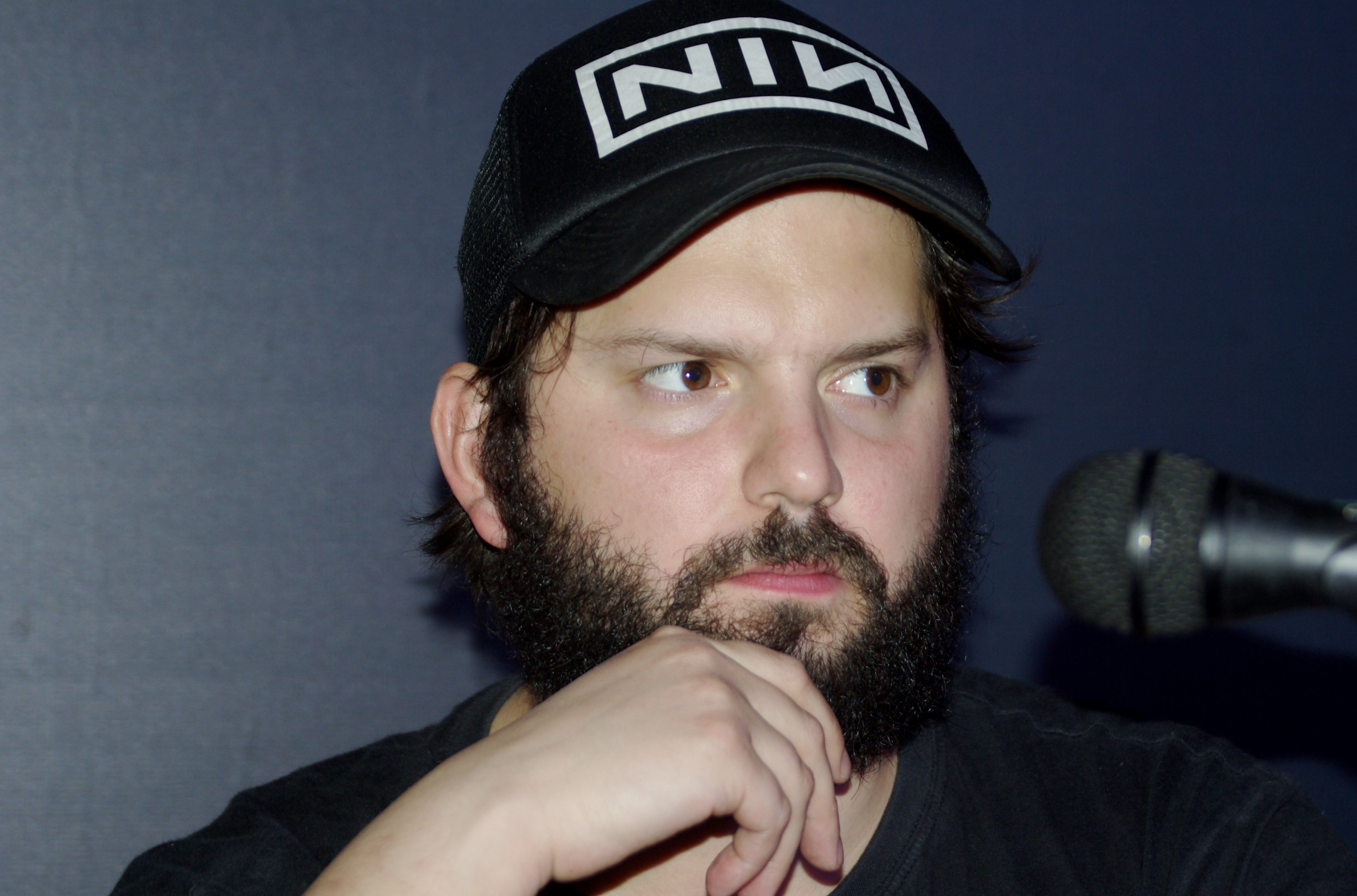
Former Chilean president Gabriel Boric wearing a Nine Inch Nails hat

Following the release of The Downward Spiral, mainstream artists began to take notice of Nine Inch Nails' influence: David Bowie compared Reznor's influence to that of The Velvet Underground. Guns N' Roses singer Axl Rose was influenced heavily by Nine Inch Nails in changing his band's sound to an industrial style in the mid-90s. Bob Ezrin, producer for Pink Floyd, Kiss, Alice Cooper, and Peter Gabriel, described Reznor in 2007 as a "true visionary" and advised aspiring artists to take note of his no-compromise attitude. Nine Inch Nails has been credited by music journalists for popularizing industrial music, despite ambivalence from Reznor.

The act has received four awards from 25 nominations, including three Grammy Awards for the songs "Wish", "Happiness in Slavery" and "As Alive as You Need Me to Be" in 1993, 1996 and 2026 respectively. Nine Inch Nails have received two Kerrang! Awards; one of them being the Kerrang! Icon in 2006, honoring the band's overall contributions since 1988 and long-standing influence on rock music. The band has also received nine nominations from the MTV Video Music Awards for several of its videos, including two nominations for the "Closer" music video and five nominations for "The Perfect Drug" music video, including Video of the Year.

In 1997, Reznor appeared in Time magazine's list of the year's most influential people, and Spin described him as "the most vital artist in music". The Recording Industry Association of America certified sales for 10.5 million units of the band's albums in the United States, which accounted for roughly half of the band's reported sales worldwide at that time. In 2003, Rolling Stone magazine placed The Downward Spiral at No. 200 in a 2003 list of The 500 Greatest Albums of All Time, and by the following year ranked Nine Inch Nails at No. 94 in their The 100 Greatest Artists of All Time list.

In 2019, Reznor and Ross received songwriting and production credits for the number-one single "Old Town Road" by Lil Nas X, which sampled their track "34 Ghosts IV" from Ghosts I–IV. "Old Town Road" broke the record for most consecutive weeks at number one on the Billboard Hot 100. As producers for the song, Reznor and Ross won a CMA Award for the 'Musical Event of the Year', along with Lil Nas X, featured artist Billy Ray Cyrus and producer YoungKio. In January 2020, after previous nominations in 2014 and 2015, Nine Inch Nails (Alessandro Cortini, Robin Finck, Danny Lohner, Trent Reznor, Atticus Ross, Ilan Rubin and Chris Vrenna) were named as inductees of the 2020 class of the Rock and Roll Hall of Fame.

Nine Inch Nails has influenced many newer artists, which according to Reznor range from "generic imitations" dating from his initial success to younger bands echoing his style in a "truer, less imitative way". Many artists and bands cite Nine Inch Nails as an influence, including:

- 5 Seconds of Summer
- AFI
- A Perfect Circle
- Aaliyah
- Axl Rose
- Billie Eilish
- Deadmau5
- Deftones
- Dope
- Evanescence
- Fat Dog
- Fear Factory
- Gary Numan
- Grimes
- Gustavo Cerati
- Halsey
- Health
- HMLTD
- KMFDM
- Korn
- Lady Gaga
- Linkin Park
- Marilyn Manson
- Miley Cyrus
- Motionless in White
- Muse
- Otep
- Phoebe Bridgers
- Placebo
- Poppy
- Porcupine Tree
- Rammstein
- Rob Zombie
- Sevendust
- Skrillex
- Slipknot
- St. Vincent
- Static-X
- The Last Dinner Party
- Timbaland

== Controversies ==
=== Corporate disputes ===
In the early 1990s, Nine Inch Nails was involved in a much-publicized feud with TVT Records, the first record label to sign the band. Reznor objected to the label's attempted interference with his intellectual property. Ultimately, Nine Inch Nails entered into a joint venture with Interscope Records in which Reznor forfeited a portion of his publishing rights to TVT Music in exchange for the freedom of having his own Nothing Records imprint. In 2005, Reznor sued his former friend and manager John Malm, co-founder of Nothing, for fraud, breach of contract and fiduciary duty, and other claims. Their relationship was formally severed in a New York courtroom, with damages awarded to Reznor in excess of $3 million.

At the behest of Prudential Securities bankruptcy proceedings, TVT put the rights to Reznor's recordings for the label on auction in 2005. This offer included the whole TVT catalog, including Pretty Hate Machine, and a percentage of royalties from Reznor's song publishing company, Leaving Hope Music/TVT Music. Rykodisc, which did not win the auction but was able to license the rights from Prudential, reissued the out-of-print Pretty Hate Machine CD on November 22, 2005. Ryko also reissued the "Head Like a Hole" CD and a vinyl edition of Pretty Hate Machine in 2006. The label considered releasing a deluxe edition, just as Interscope had done for The Downward Spiral. They were influenced by Reznor and liked the idea, but did not want to pay him for the album and the idea was scrapped.

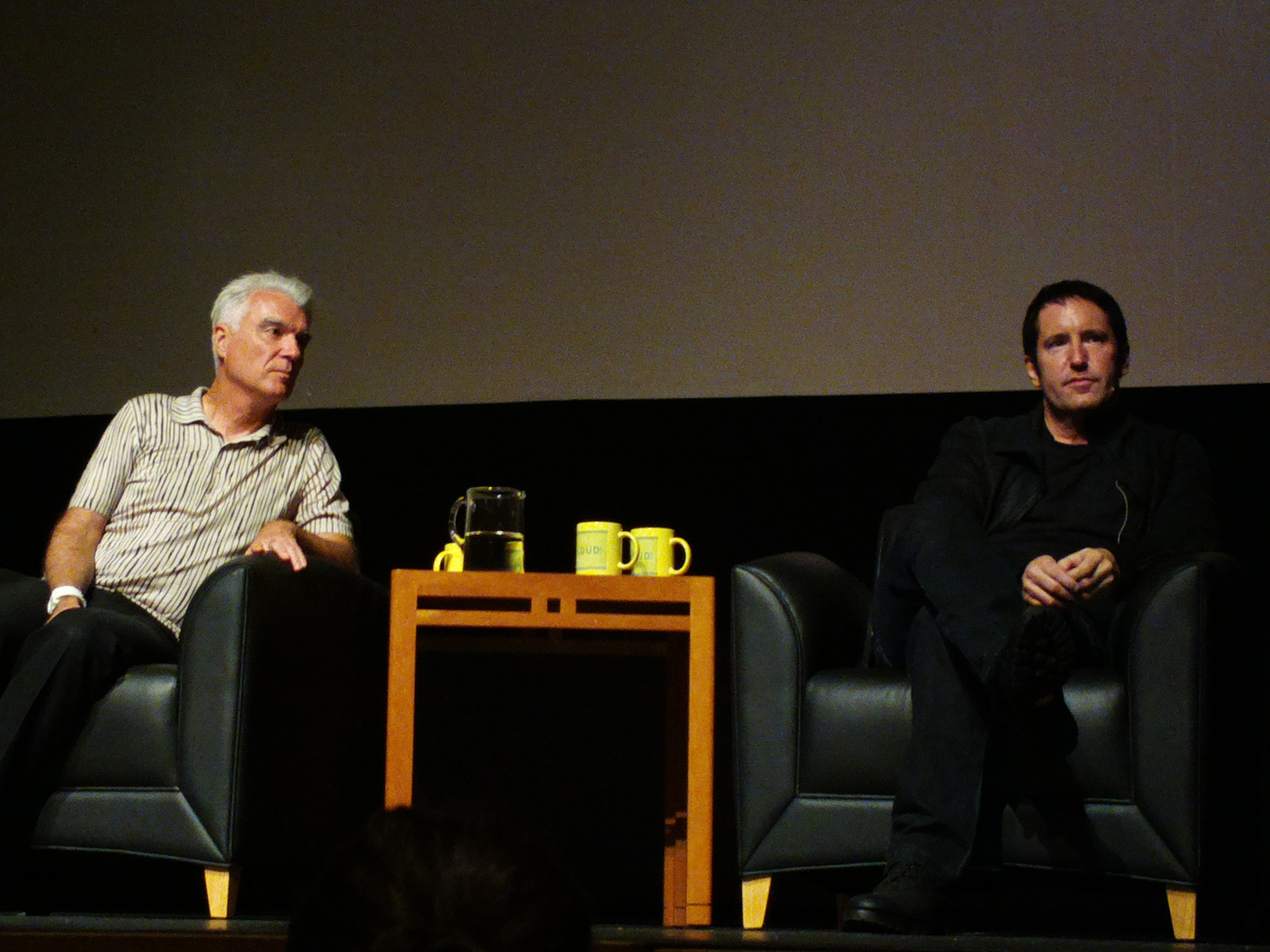
Reznor (right) discussing his return to major labels at an October 2012 panel with David Byrne

In May 2007, Reznor made a post on the official Nine Inch Nails website skeptical of Universal Music Group (parent company of Nine Inch Nails' record label, Interscope Records) for its pricing and distribution plans for Year Zero. He labeled the company's retail pricing of Year Zero in Australia as "ABSURD", concluding that "as a reward for being a 'true fan' you get ripped off". Reznor went on to say that he hated Interscope, and in later years the "climate" of record labels may have an increasingly ambivalent impact on consumers who buy music. Reznor's post, specifically his criticism of the recording industry at large, elicited considerable media attention. In September 2007, Reznor continued his attack on UMG at a concert in Australia, urging fans there to "steal" his music online instead of purchasing it legally. Reznor went on to encourage the crowd to "steal and steal and steal some more and give it to all your friends and keep on stealing".

Reznor announced on October 8, 2007, that Nine Inch Nails had fulfilled its contractual commitments to Interscope Records and was now free to proceed as a "totally free agent, free of any recording contract with any label". Reznor also speculated that he would release the next Nine Inch Nails album online in a similar fashion to The Inevitable Rise and Liberation of NiggyTardust!, which he produced. Reznor later released the first nine tracks of Ghosts I–IV and the entirety of The Slip in 2008 for free download.

In another post on his website, Reznor again openly criticized Universal Music Group for preventing him from launching an official interactive fan remix website. Universal declined to host the site just days before its scheduled launch, citing the potential "accusation", in Reznor's words, "that they are sponsoring the same technical violation of copyright they are suing [other media companies] for". Reznor wrote in response that he was "challenged at the last second to find a way of bringing this idea to life without getting splashed by the urine as these media companies piss all over each other's feet". Despite these obstacles, the remix website was launched in November 2007.

Nine Inch Nails was scheduled to perform at the 2005 MTV Movie Awards, but withdrew from the show due to a disagreement with the network over the use of an unaltered image of George W. Bush as a backdrop to the band's performance of "The Hand That Feeds". Soon afterwards, Reznor wrote on his official website: "Apparently, the image of our president is as offensive to MTV as it is to me." MTV replied that it respected Reznor's point of view, but was "uncomfortable" with the performance being "built around partisan political statements". A performance by Foo Fighters replaced Nine Inch Nails' time slot on the show.

Another ceremony incident had occurred at the 56th Annual Grammy Awards in 2014. The band performed "Copy of A" and "My God Is the Sun" with Queens of the Stone Age, Lindsey Buckingham, and Dave Grohl towards the end of the broadcast; however, the performance was not shown in full to the audience at home as advertisements had cut-in midway through the second song. Despite an apology from producer Kenneth Ehrlich, Reznor later heavily criticized the situation.

In 2006, after being alerted by a fan website, Reznor issued a cease and desist to Fox News Channel for using three songs from The Fragile on air without permission. The songs "La Mer", "The Great Below", and "The Mark Has Been Made" appeared in an episode of War Stories with Oliver North detailing the battle of Iwo Jima. A post appeared on Reznor's blog, which read: "Thanks for the Fox News heads-up. A cease and desist has been issued. FUCK Fox Fucking News."

As part of the alternate reality game which accompanied the release of Year Zero, three tracks from the album ("My Violent Heart", "Survivalism", and "Me, I'm Not") were intentionally "leaked" prior to their official release at a number of Nine Inch Nails concerts on USB flash drives. The high-quality audio files quickly circulated the internet, and owners of websites hosting the files soon received cease and desist orders from the Recording Industry Association of America, despite the fact that the viral campaign, and the use of USB drives, was sanctioned by Nine Inch Nails' record label. The source that broke the story was quoted as saying, "These fucking idiots are going after a campaign that the label signed off on."

The music of Nine Inch Nails has reportedly been used by the U.S. military as music torture to break down the resolve of detainees. Reznor objected to the use of his music in this way with the following message on the front page of the Nine Inch Nails website: "It's difficult for me to imagine anything more profoundly insulting, demeaning and enraging than discovering music you've put your heart and soul into creating has been used for purposes of torture. If there are any legal options that can be realistically taken they will be aggressively pursued, with any potential monetary gains donated to human rights charities. Thank GOD this country has appeared to side with reason and we can put the Bush administration's reign of power, greed, lawlessness and madness behind us."

Aside from disagreements over the usage of Nine Inch Nails material, some corporations have dismissed content due to perceived obscenity. In 2009, Apple rejected an update to Nine Inch Nails' iPhone application, NIN: Access, because it found The Downward Spiral to contain "offensive or obscene content", referring to the lyrical content. Reznor criticized their decision, citing the audio was also available through the iTunes application.

A similar incident involving digital content distribution occurred in 2013 when Nine Inch Nails re-released the original 1993 film Broken on Vimeo. Within hours of launch, the video was removed due to terms of service violation on material that "harass, incite hatred or depict excessive violence".

=== Impact of The Downward Spiral ===
The album is a loose concept work that traces a protagonist's psychological descent into self-destruction; its lyrics treat sex, self-harm, addiction, religion and rage in frank, often transgressive language and imagery. Many reviewers hailed the record as a major creative achievement, but some critics and commentators condemned it as deliberately shocking and gratuitously violent or sexual. Early mainstream reviews and later retrospectives both emphasize how the album’s abrasive production and unflinching subject matter provoked intense emotional responses — admiration from many quarters and alarm from others who saw the record as feeding nihilism or sensationalism.

The music video for the album's single "Closer", directed by Mark Romanek, became one of the era’s most discussed examples of visual censorship. Romanek's clip uses disturbing, fetishistic and religious imagery (nude and semi-nude figures, S&M paraphernalia, grotesque props and symbolic tableaux); television networks required extensive edits before the video could be shown in daytime rotation. The original uncut video was for years restricted to adult outlets and late-night specialty programming, while edited versions — including deliberately signposted "missing scene" cuts — were the ones most often seen on MTV. Romanek and Reznor have both described their willingness to keep the uncut version intact even if MTV refused to air it, and the video’s censorship paradoxically amplified public interest in the song and the album. Retrospectives on the clip treat it as both an artistic high point and a lightning rod for debates about what could be shown on music television in the 1990s.

Certain lyrics on the record, notably "Big Man with a Gun", drew attention from politicians and cultural critics who were, in the mid-1990s, mounting high-profile campaigns against perceived excesses in popular music. In the period when leaders such as William Bennett and C. Delores Tucker were publicly pressuring music companies over violent or sexually explicit rap lyrics, corporate executives were sometimes asked to explain or defend other labels' rosters as well. Reporting from major outlets at the time documented meetings and public complaints that pulled in acts beyond rap; executives and the press referenced violent lyrics from across genres as part of a wider debate about industry responsibility. Reznor publicly insisted that some material (including "Big Man with a Gun") functioned as satire, a grotesque caricature of toxic masculinity, and pushed back on what he characterized as simplistic attempts to label and blame musicians for broader social problems.

== Live performances ==
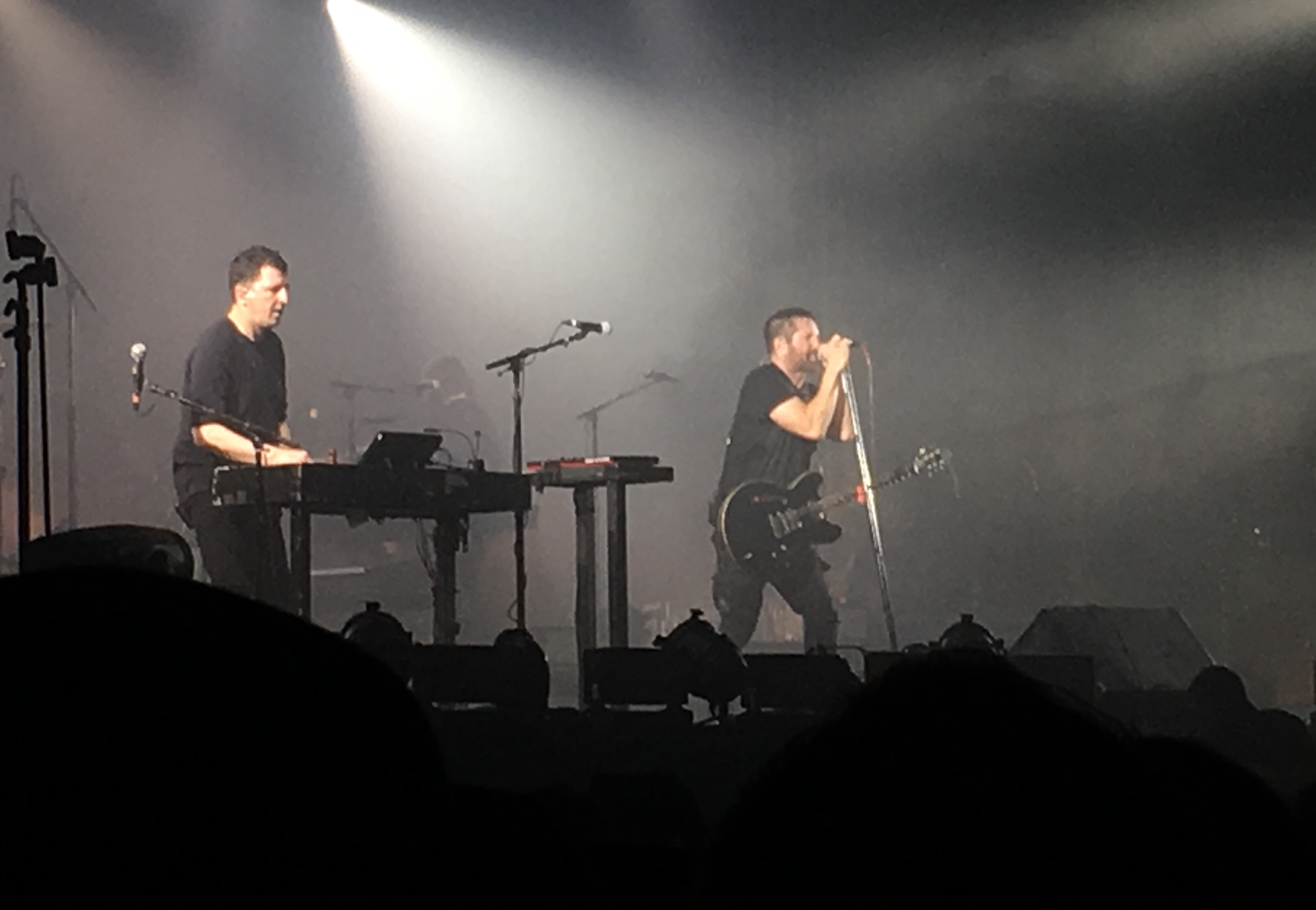
Atticus Ross (left) and Reznor (right) performing in October 2018.

Until Atticus Ross joined in 2016, Reznor was the sole official member of Nine Inch Nails. However, Reznor tours with a group of musicians. The lineup of the live band often changes between major tours. Reznor cited the long gestation period between studio albums as part of the reason for these frequent personnel changes, as well as his desire for fresh interpretations of his music. Band members have occasionally been invited to participate in the recording process, but creative control within the studio has always been exclusively with Reznor.

The Tapeworm project was created in 1995 as a Nine Inch Nails side-project between Reznor and various live-band members as a more "democratic" creative environment. The band initially included live band members Danny Lohner and Charlie Clouser, but eventually expanded to include other frequent Nine Inch Nails contributors Josh Freese, Atticus Ross, and Alan Moulder. However, after 9 years of studio sessions, no material was ever officially released from the group, and it was confirmed to be no longer active in 2005.

Nine Inch Nails' concerts systematically incorporate a wide repertoire of visual resources, which include complex lighting, scenography and projection designs, designed to reinforce and expand the sonic experience. Numerous songs contain specifically designed visual support, such as synchronized lighting sequences and projected image montages.

=== Tours ===
- Pretty Hate Machine Tour Series (1988–1991)
- Self Destruct Tour (1994–1996)
- Fragility Tour (1999–2000)
- Live: With Teeth Tour (2005–2006)
- Performance 2007 Tour (2007)
- Lights in the Sky Tour (2008)
- Wave Goodbye Tour (2009)
- Twenty Thirteen Tour (2013–2014)
- I Can't Seem To Wake Up (2017)
- Cold and Black and Infinite (2018)
- U.S. 2022 & U.K. 2022 (2022)
- Peel It Back Tour (2025–2026)

== Band members ==
=== Official members ===
- Trent Reznor – lead and backing vocals, guitars, keyboards, synthesizers, piano, programming, bass, saxophone, drums, percussion (1988–present) (Note: This member was inducted into the Rock and Roll Hall of Fame.)
- Atticus Ross – keyboards, synthesizers, programming, bass, backing vocals (2016–present)

=== Live band members ===
- Robin Finck – guitars, synthesizers, keyboards, lap steel, violin, backing vocals, occasional lead vocals (1994–1996, 1999–2000, 2008–2009, 2013–present)
- Josh Freese – drums, marimba (2005, 2005–2008, 2025–present)
- Stu Brooks – bass, keyboards, guitars, backing vocals (2026–present)

=== Notable former live band members ===
- Chris Vrenna – drums, percussion, keyboards, samplers (1988–1990, 1992–1996)
- Richard Patrick – guitars, backing vocals (1989–1993)
- Jeff Ward – drums (1990–1991; died 1993)
- James Woolley – keyboards, synthesizers, programming, backing vocals (1991–1994; died 2016)
- Danny Lohner – bass, guitars, synthesizers, backing vocals (1993–2003)
- Charlie Clouser – keyboards, synthesizers, theremin, percussion, programming, backing vocals (1994–2001)
- Jerome Dillon – drums, guitars (1999–2005)
- Jeordie White – bass, guitars, backing vocals (2005–2007)
- Aaron North – guitars, backing vocals (2005–2007)
- Alessandro Cortini – bass, keyboards, synthesizers, guitars, backing vocals (2005–2008, 2013–2025)
- Justin Meldal-Johnsen – bass, backing vocals (2008–2009)
- Ilan Rubin – drums, percussion, bass, guitars, cello, keyboards, backing vocals (2008–2009, 2013–2025)

== Discography ==
- Pretty Hate Machine (1989)
- Broken (1992) (Note: Released as a studio EP.)
- The Downward Spiral (1994)
- The Fragile (1999)
- With Teeth (2005)
- Year Zero (2007)
- Ghosts I–IV (2008)
- The Slip (2008)
- Hesitation Marks (2013)
- Not the Actual Events (2016)
- Add Violence (2017)
- Bad Witch (2018)
- Ghosts V: Together (2020)
- Ghosts VI: Locusts (2020)
- Tron: Ares (2025) (Note: Released as a soundtrack album.)
- Nine Inch Noize (2026) (Note: Released as a collaborative album with Boys Noize.)

== Awards ==
Nine Inch Nails has been nominated for 13 Grammy Awards and has won awards on three occasions—for "Wish" in 1992, "Happiness in Slavery" in 1995, and "As Alive as You Need Me to Be" in 2026:

Year	Nominee / work	Award	Result
1992	"Wish"	Best Metal Performance	Won
1995	The Downward Spiral	Best Alternative Music Performance	Nominated
1995	"Happiness in Slavery" (from Woodstock '94 compilation)	Best Metal Performance	Won
1996	"Hurt"	Best Rock Song	Nominated
1997	"The Perfect Drug"	Best Hard Rock Performance	Nominated
1999	The Fragile	Best Alternative Music Album	Nominated
1999	"Starfuckers, Inc."	Best Metal Performance	Nominated
2000	"Into the Void"	Best Male Rock Vocal Performance	Nominated
2005	"The Hand That Feeds"	Best Hard Rock Performance	Nominated
2006	"Every Day is Exactly the Same"	Best Hard Rock Performance	Nominated
2009	"34 Ghosts IV"	Best Rock Instrumental Performance	Nominated
2009	Ghosts I–IV	Best Boxed Set or Limited Edition Package	Nominated
2013	Hesitation Marks	Best Alternative Music Album	Nominated
2026	"As Alive as You Need Me to Be"	Best Rock Song	Won
2026	"As Alive as You Need Me to Be"	Best Song Written for Visual Media	Nominated
