= List of War Stories with Oliver North episodes =

List of episodes from the series War Stories with Oliver North.

== Episodes ==
=== 2001 ===
EP#	Title	Airdate
001	War Stories Investigates the Jihad	
002	The Pueblo Incident	September 30, 2001
003	Bataan: To Hell and Back	October 7, 2001
004	Battle for Frozen Chosin	October 27, 2001
005	Anzio	November 4, 2001
006	Spies	November 11, 2001
007	Bandages on the Battlefield	November 18, 2001
008		December 1, 2001
009	Khe Sanh	December 2, 2001
010	Okinawa: The Last Battle of World War II	December 30, 2001

=== 2002 ===
EP#	Title	Airdate
011	Iwo Jima	January 1, 2002
012	The Siege at Khe Sanh	February 3, 2002
013	They Invaded America	April 7, 2002
014	Paratroopers	May 25, 2002
015	Normandy	June 8, 2002
016	Animal Warriors	June 9, 2002
017	Choppers of Vietnam	June 16, 2002
018	The Tet Offensive	June 23, 2002
019	Bomber Boys	August 11, 2002
020	Battle of Midway	August 18, 2002
021	Bloody Tarawa	August 25, 2002
022	Doolittle Raiders	September 22, 2002
023		November 24, 2002
024	Attack of the Japanese Midget Subs	December 8, 2002
025	Winter Warriors: The 10th Mountain Division	December 15, 2002
026	Forgotten Front and the 1st Air Commandos	December 22, 2002

=== 2003 ===
027	Battle of Britain	January 5, 2003
028	Hill Battles of Korea	January 12, 2003
029	Battle of the Bulge	January 19, 2003
030	Hell in the Pacific: Guadalcanal	January 26, 2003
031	Desert War	February 2, 2003
032	(Unknown Title)	May 11, 2003
033	The Fighter Aces	July 20, 2003
034	Running the Gauntlet: The Merchant Marine	July 27, 2003
035	The Life and Times of General Douglas MacArthur	August 3, 2003
036	The Untold Story of the Eastern Front	August 10, 2003
037	Assault on the Marianas	August 17, 2003
038	Agent 146: Spying for the Third Reich	August 24, 2003
039	Black Sheep Squadron	August 31, 2003
040	Big Red One	September 7, 2003
041	Desperate Battle for the Pusan Perimeter	September 28, 2003
042	Salute to the USO	December 14, 2003

=== 2004 ===
043	The Siege of Firebase Ripcord	March 7, 2004
044	Angels on the Battlefield	March 21, 2004
045	Berlin: Standoff Behind the Iron Curtain	April 4, 2004
046	Biography: Dwight Eisenhower	April 18, 2004
047	Guardians of the Sea: The U.S. Coast Guard	May 9, 2004
048	Deadlines on the Battlefield	May 16, 2004
049	The Battle for Wake Island	May 23, 2004
050	Battle for Leyte Gulf	May 30, 2004
051	Confrontation in Cuba	June 27, 2004
052	Iraq: The Struggle for Freedom	July 11, 2004
053	Silent Warriors: Submarines of the Pacific	July 18, 2004
054	Guadalcanal	August 8, 2004
055	America's Home Front: The War on Terror	September 12, 2004
056	Secret Race for the Atomic Bomb	September 26, 2004
057	The Battle for Fallujah: A War Stories Special	November 21, 2004

=== 2005 ===
058	Friends and Enemies: Japanese Americans During World War II	January 16, 2005
059	Final Justice: War Crimes Trials of World War II	February 13, 2005
060	The Fight for Their Lives: Disabled Veterans	February 20, 2005
061	The Tin Can Sailors	February 27, 2005
062	The Invasion of Sicily	March 13, 2005
063	Flashpoint Vietnam: The Road of War	April 10, 2005
064	The Last Days of Adolf Hitler and the Third Reich	May 8, 2005
065	The New Face of War in Iraq	June 26, 2005
066	Retaking the Philippines	July 17, 2005
067	Freeing France From Hitler	September 18, 2005
068	Operation Rolling Thunder	September 25, 2005

=== 2006 ===
069	Inside Iraq: Eyewitness to History	January 29, 2006
070	War Stories Investigates: Deception in the Pacific	February 12, 2006
071	Hollywood Goes to War	March 5, 2006
072	The Battle for the Huertgen Forest	April 23, 2006
073	The Remarkable Life and Mysterious Death of General Patton	April 30, 2006
074	Women of World War II	May 14, 2006
075	The Real Story of Hamburger Hill	June 18, 2006
076	In the Jaws of Hell: Eastern Europe During WWII	June 25, 2006
077	From the Ballpark to the Battlefield: Baseball and WWII	July 9, 2006
078	(Unknown Title)	July 30, 2006
079	Prisoners of the Rising Sun	September 24, 2006

=== 2007 ===
080	The Homefront to the Frontlines	February 11, 2007
081	Biography: Winston Churchill	March 18, 2007
082	Secrets of the Bomb: Manhattan Project to Tehran	April 15, 2007
083	Yanks in the RAF	June 17, 2007
084	Baseball and WWII	July 8, 2007
085	The Navy's Fighting Seabees	September 8, 2007
086	Peleliu: The Forgotten Battle	September 16, 2007
087	Okinawa	September 22, 2007
088	Terror in Paradise	November 3, 2007
089	War Stories Investigates: The Disaster at Dieppe	November 10, 2007
090	War Stories Biography: Harry S. Truman	November 17, 2007

=== 2008 ===
090	Red Tails: The Saga of the Tuskegee Airmen	February 9, 2008
091	Iraq: Five Years in the Fight for Freedom	March 23, 2008
092	Masterstroke! The Battle for Inchon and Seoul	May 24, 2008
093	Leave No One Behind	July 6, 2008
094	The Battle for Afghanistan	November 8, 2008
095	The Furious Fight for Dong Ha	November 9, 2008

=== 2009 ===
096	Inside Special Ops	April 18, 2009
097	The Life and Times of Lyndon Baines Johnson	May 24, 2009
098	The Bloody Battle for the Boot: Italy in WWII	May 24, 2009
099	They Did Invade America	August 9, 2009
100	Drugs, Money and Narco-Terror	August 22, 2009

=== 2010 ===
101	High Tech Warriors on the Battlefield	April 11, 2010

=== 2016 ===
102	Fighting ISIS	March 25, 2016
