= Bad Witch =

Studio album by Nine Inch Nails
- Released: June 22, 2018
- Genre: Industrial rock
- Length: 30:11
- Labels: The Null Corporation; Capitol
- Producers: Trent Reznor; Atticus Ross

Nine Inch Nails chronology
Add Violence (2017)	Bad Witch (2018)	Ghosts V: Together (2020)

Halo numbers chronology
Halo 31 (2017)	Halo 32 (2018)	Halo 33 (2020)

Singles from Bad Witch
- 1. "God Break Down the Door" Released: May 17, 2018

Bad Witch is the ninth studio album by the American industrial rock band Nine Inch Nails, released by The Null Corporation and Capitol Records on June 22, 2018. It is the last of a trilogy of releases, following their two previous EPs Not the Actual Events (2016) and Add Violence (2017). As with the previous releases in the trilogy, it was produced by Trent Reznor and Atticus Ross, making it the band's first studio album since 2007's Year Zero to not be co-produced by the long-time collaborator Alan Moulder, who is credited with mixing the album.

The record diverges from the style of previous Nine Inch Nails work, notably by the inclusion of saxophone performances by Reznor. The album is reminiscent of (and influenced by) David Bowie's final studio album Blackstar, with Reznor having collaborated with Bowie in the 1990s as well as citing Bowie as a primary influence. At just over 30 minutes long, the record is Nine Inch Nails' shortest full-length release. The Cold and Black and Infinite North America 2018 Tour was announced alongside its release to promote the album, in addition to the album's sole single, "God Break Down the Door".

Upon its release, Bad Witch received generally positive reviews from critics, who applauded its influences and production; some called it the band's best work in a decade. The album reached No. 12 in the US and UK, as well as the top five of various Billboard charts.

== Background ==
Nine Inch Nails planned a trilogy of EPs, starting with Not the Actual Events in December 2016 and followed by Add Violence in July 2017. Regarding the third entry in the trilogy and its delayed production, frontman Trent Reznor said: "We started out with a rigid concept, having not written them all. As we finished Add Violence, we found ourselves... it felt too predictable. It felt like we were forcing things. Musically and storytelling-wise. The reason this has been delayed is because it took us a while for – what has become the third [record] – to reveal itself to us."

Following a handful of concerts in support of Add Violence, Reznor was enthusiastic to begin work on the final part of the trilogy. After experiencing creative difficulty in the studio, he and bandmate Atticus Ross decided to focus on doing something "exciting" and "risky", which included the incorporation of saxophone. Those sessions led to Bad Witch, a studio album inspired in part by David Bowie. While Bad Witch was originally set to be an EP, it developed into a full-length album; at 30 minutes in length, it is the band's shortest to date. Reznor initially saw the trio of planned EPs as one long album with three smaller components, but, after seeing how EPs tend to be overlooked (especially on music streaming sites), Reznor decided to promote Bad Witch to a full album.

== Composition ==
"Over and Out"
The album's closer showcases the David Bowie influence

Musically, Bad Witch is a concise album that utilizes aggressive instrumentation and vocals associated with industrial rock, and quieter, more somber music most prominent in the two instrumental tracks on the record. Reznor employs a saxophone at multiple points on the album, and occasionally sings in a different way to his normal manner, with some critics comparing the style to Bowie's. The album incorporates diverse sounds and instrumentation reminiscent of many genres and musical styles. Reznor's saxophone performances play a prominent role in the album, making the album distinct from previous releases by Nine Inch Nails. The only song on the album to be released as a single is "God Break Down the Door". The album contains two instrumental songs, "Play the Goddamned Part" and "I'm Not from This World", respectively described as "a discordant, freeform jazz jam amidst clashing electronics" and "droning and hypnotic". The album's sixth and final track, "Over and Out", begins as a relatively upbeat electronic song but ends as a protracted segment of white noise that concludes Bad Witch. This may be compared to the closing track of Add Violence (which precedes Bad Witch in the trilogy of releases), "The Background World", which ends on a repeated loop that is gradually compressed into white noise.

Several critics have compared Bad Witch to Reznor and Ross' film scores. Others likened the album to Bowie's Blackstar (2016), and some to Reznor's soundtrack for the 1996 video game Quake.

== Release ==
On June 22, 2018, the album was released to retailers worldwide. It entered on several international charts and at 12 on the Billboard 200.

== Critical reception ==
Professional ratings
Aggregate scores
Source	Rating
AnyDecentMusic?	7.2/10
Metacritic	77/100
Review scores
Source	Rating
AllMusic	3/5 stars
The A.V. Club	B−
Consequence of Sound	B+
The Independent	3/5 stars
Mojo	3/5 stars
NME	5/5 stars
The Observer	4/5 stars
Pitchfork	8.0/10
Q	4/5 stars
Slant Magazine	3.5/5 stars

According to the review aggregator Metacritic, Bad Witch received "generally favorable reviews" based on a weighted average score of 77 out of 100 from 23 critic scores. AllMusic's Neil Z. Yeung called the album "frustrating" but also "the most cohesive and enveloping experience of this period". Terence Cawley of The Boston Globe gave Bad Witch a positive review, writing, "Reznor is still making records that crackle with restless energy. For an artist who once specialized in massive concept albums, the short-and-sweet approach of Bad Witch suits him well." Writing for NME, Tom Connick gave the album a perfect score, calling it the band's best release in a decade. The Independent's Ilana Kaplan noted that despite being only thirty minutes long, the album was full of complexity and would probably be received as a sensory overload. Writing for Q, George Garner considered the album an "excellent reprisal" of Nine Inch Nails' "industrial aggression", concluding that after thirty years, the band sounded reinvigorated. Spencer Kornhaber of The Atlantic felt that Bad Witch does not reach the highs of 1992's Broken or 1994's The Downward Spiral, but it does not dishonor them either. Drowned in Sound's Christian Cottingham was more mixed on the album, criticizing it for relying too much on previous Nine Inch Nails sounds and material. Sam Sodomsky of Pitchfork wrote, "For the first time in a long time, Reznor sounds like he's got his eye on the future."

== Track listing ==
All tracks are written by Trent Reznor and Atticus Ross.

No.	Title	Length
1.	"Shit Mirror"	3:06
2.	"Ahead of Ourselves"	3:30
3.	"Play the Goddamned Part" (instrumental)	4:51
4.	"God Break Down the Door"	4:15
5.	"I'm Not from This World" (instrumental)	6:41
6.	"Over and Out"	7:48
Total length:		30:11

== Personnel ==
Credits adapted from the liner notes of Bad Witch.

Nine Inch Nails

- Trent Reznor – vocals, arrangements, performance, production, programming, saxophone
- Atticus Ross – arrangements, performance, production, programming

Additional personnel

- Alan Moulder – mixing
- Tom Baker – mastering
- Chris Richardson – engineering
- Justin McGrath – engineering
- Ian Astbury – additional vocals (track 1)
- Mariqueen Maandig – additional vocals (track 1)

== Charts ==
Chart (2018)	Peak position
Australian Albums (ARIA)	9
Austrian Albums (Ö3 Austria)	16
Belgian Albums (Ultratop Flanders)	21
Belgian Albums (Ultratop Wallonia)	24
Canadian Albums (Billboard)	15
Czech Albums (ČNS IFPI)	39
Dutch Albums (Album Top 100)	43
French Albums (SNEP)	37
German Albums (Offizielle Top 100)	28
Greek Albums (IFPI)	68
Hungarian Albums (MAHASZ)	34
Irish Albums (IRMA)	50
Italian Albums (FIMI)	49
Japanese Albums (Oricon)	43
New Zealand Heatseeker Albums (RMNZ)	4
Portuguese Albums (AFP)	18
Scottish Albums (Official Charts)	6
Spanish Albums (PROMUSICAE)	31
Swiss Albums (Schweizer Hitparade)	5
UK Albums (Official Charts)	12
UK Rock & Metal Albums (Official Charts)	1
US Billboard 200	12
US Top Alternative Albums (Billboard)	2
US Top Rock Albums (Billboard)	2
