= Less Than (song) =

Nine Inch Nails song

Single by Nine Inch Nails

from the album Add Violence
- Released: July 13, 2017
- Genre: Industrial rock
- Length: 3:30
- Label: The Null Corporation
- Songwriters: Trent Reznor; Atticus Ross
- Producers: Trent Reznor; Atticus Ross

Nine Inch Nails singles chronology
"Everything" (2013)	"Less Than" (2017)	"God Break Down the Door" (2018)

Music video
- "Nine Inch Nails – Less Than" on YouTube

"Less Than" is a song by American industrial rock band Nine Inch Nails from their EP Add Violence (2017). It was released on July 13, 2017, becoming the band's first single since "Everything" in August 2013. The song's music video alludes to Polybius, an urban legend about a dangerous and addictive video arcade video game that was purportedly used by clandestine government agents to mine information on players. It peaked at No. 10 on the Billboard US Mainstream Rock Songs chart.

== Background ==
"Less Than" was announced and released as the lead single and opening track of the Add Violence EP on July 13, 2017. The song's music video was released on the same day; it features an extreme close-up of a woman staring at a retro-styled video game which shows the song's lyrics in gameplay, her eyes gradually becoming glazed over, while a hand begins to emerge from the screen at the end of the video (as a reference to Videodrome). The game featured is Polybius, created by English video game designer Jeff Minter and playable on the PS4. The video game itself is based on an urban legend of the same name—an alleged arcade game that existed in the 1980s which data mined people's personal information for the government—leading some publications to suggest a similarity in themes between the game and song.

== Themes and composition ==
Spin noted the similarities between "Less Than" and other Nine Inch Nails songs, such as similar lyrical refrains between the song and 2013 single "Copy of A" ("Go and look what you've gone done" vs. "Now look what you've gone and done") and similarly structured ominous choruses between it and 1990 single "Head Like a Hole", with both songs referring to "getting what one deserves". The song starts off relatively upbeat and simple, slowly becoming more ominous and cluttered before abruptly ending. Loudwire compared the song's sound to the band's Pretty Hate Machine era, noting that the song featured "a heavy synth base" and that "guitars still wail in the background over Trent Reznor's vocals [...] a huge guitar chorus fires into focus, featuring a clean and catchy kind of riff". It also states that "things get noisy and weird as the song progresses, giving the best of both worlds with catchy, clean work found on the likes of With Teeth while also showing Reznor letting loose before an abrupt ending". NPR described the song as having an "anthemic rock chorus".

== Reception ==
The song was generally well received by critics. Spin praised the song, calling it "comfort food for Trent Reznor fans" and concluding that it "may be the best that we can hope for from the mature, more dignified Nine Inch Nails in 2017". Multiple journalists singled out the song as the best or standout track from Add Violence.

== Personnel ==
- Trent Reznor – vocals
- Atticus Ross – performance
- Sharlotte Gibson – additional vocals
- Allison Iraheta – additional vocals

== Charts ==
Chart (2017)	Peak position
Scottish Singles Sales (Official Charts)	92
UK Rock & Metal (Official Charts)	26
US Alternative Airplay (Billboard)	22
US Mainstream Rock Airplay (Billboard)	10
US Rock & Alternative Airplay (Billboard)	21
