= Not the Actual Events =

EP by Nine Inch Nails
- Released: December 23, 2016
- Recorded: 2015–2016
- Genres: Industrial rock; industrial metal
- Length: 21:08
- Label: The Null Corporation
- Producers: Trent Reznor; Atticus Ross

Nine Inch Nails chronology
Halo I–IV (2015)	Not the Actual Events (2016)	The Fragile: Deviations 1 (2016)

Halo numbers chronology
"Halo 28" (2013)	"Halo 29" (2016)	"Halo 30" (2016)

Not the Actual Events is the second extended play (EP) and tenth major release by the American industrial rock band Nine Inch Nails. It was released physically on December 23, 2016, under Trent Reznor's own label The Null Corporation, while those who had pre-ordered received a download link a day early. The second Nine Inch Nails EP of original material following Broken (1992), it marks longtime collaborator Atticus Ross's first appearance as an official member of the band. The digital pre-orders included a "physical component" that was shipped in early March 2017. The EP is the first in a trilogy released in 2016–2018, preceding Add Violence (2017) and the band's ninth studio album Bad Witch (2018).

The EP received positive reviews from critics, who praised the return to Nine Inch Nails' older, more abrasive sound, and debuted at number 26 in the US.

== Background ==
In an interview promoting Apple Music, Trent Reznor mentioned he has started "messing around with some things" in regard to a new Nine Inch Nails album, stating, "It's not a record I'm trying to finish in a month. It's more just feeling around in the dark and seeing what sounds interesting." In December 2015, Reznor reported that "Nine Inch Nails will return in 2016". He and Atticus Ross later scored the soundtracks for Before the Flood and Patriots Day in 2016.

In December 2016, Reznor commented on his statement regarding Nine Inch Nails' return by the end of the year: "Those words did come out of my mouth, didn't they? [...] Just wait and see what happens." Three days later, Reznor announced Not the Actual Events, along with reissues of Nine Inch Nails' previous releases.

In June 2017, in an email that was issued out to customers waiting on delayed vinyl orders, Reznor confirmed that Not the Actual Events would actually make up the first part of a trilogy of EPs, with the second installment entitled Add Violence being released July 2017. The final EP of the trilogy grew into a studio album, Bad Witch, which was later released on June 22, 2018.

== Music ==
The EP marks a return to Nine Inch Nails' 1990s sound, departing from the texture and groove-oriented style of the previous album, Hesitation Marks. Nevertheless, it also preserves electronic elements of the Hesitation Marks and Year Zero, but features "more organic elements" such as "noisy guitars, nostalgic piano lines and heavily distorted bass used on The Fragile and With Teeth." Reznor described the record as "an unfriendly, fairly impenetrable record that we needed to make." The sound of the EP has also been labeled as industrial metal.

"Burning Bright (Field on Fire)"
"Burning Bright (Field on Fire)" showcases the EP's noise and overwhelming atmosphere.

The intro track, "Branches/Bones", features the modern polished production and formulae of Nine Inch Nails' post-The Fragile output. It was compared to previous NIN tracks, including "1,000,000", "Discipline", "Wish" and "Starfuckers, Inc.". "Dear World," is a synthesizer-driven track, enhanced by sequencers and percussion as Reznor "speaks his thoughts on the downward path the society has taken." “She’s Gone Away” features guest vocals from Reznor’s wife, How to Destroy Angels vocalist Mariqueen Maandig. The song was specifically written for then-upcoming Twin Peaks series, at the request of David Lynch. Initially, Reznor pitched the song "This Isn't The Place" (which was later included on the band's 2017 EP Add Violence). However, Lynch rejected the song as he had wanted something "more menacing and unpleasant", prompting the creation of "She's Gone Away", which was completed a day later. Dave Grohl drums on "The Idea of You", which has been described as "a merger of industrial and alternative rock; the track also features a drum solo and polyrhythmic chorus. "Burning Bright (Field on Fire)" is a sludge track and has been compared to the music of Godflesh.

Reznor said of creating the EP:

Something that we have always felt strongly about is the role of what we call rock has been one that should feel untethered and filled with expression and uncompromised and at times challenging. In general, it seems from my perspective, and I feel Atticus feels the same way, that most entertainment, particularly music is pretty boring. Certainly, rock is boring. A lot of what's blessed as "the cool thing" feels pretty generic and also feels, a lot of it, like a desperate plea for commercial airplay and success. That combined with just our own worldview and a kind of daydream I was having led to "let's make a record that feels challenging, and exciting to us"... I wanted the music to sound kind of ugly and to sound unfriendly, not suck you in with a sexy hook.

== Release ==
=== Physical component ===
The digital pre-orders included a "physical component" that was due to be shipped in January 2017 but was delayed until March. It featured a black envelope containing liner notes on card posts along with a see-through photograph of Reznor and Ross. The release was controversial as it contained some form of black powder. A warning label stuck on the back of the envelope read:

To be read IN ITS ENTIRETY before opening. Actions have consequences! N.T.A.E. may contain subversive elements that produce feelings of euphoria and may be harmful and unsettling to the consumer. Likewise, this physical package may lead to unrealized expectations or unexpected results upon opening. Caution should be exercised with both. AND THIS IS IMPORTANT… This will make a mess. By opening this envelope in any way, you assume all risks to your person and/or property, and waive any claim against The Null Corporation, any of its subsidiaries or affiliated entities from any and all damages or harm you may incur.

=== Vinyl ===
The pre-orders for the vinyl version were released in August 2017. The vinyl A-Side contains the five tracks listed in the track listing, while the B-Side consists of the final three tracks of The Downward Spiral ("Reptile", "The Downward Spiral", and "Hurt") recorded in reverse.

== Critical reception ==
Professional ratings
Aggregate scores
Source	Rating
AnyDecentMusic?	6.7/10
Metacritic	74/100
Review scores
Source	Rating
AllMusic	3/5 stars
Alternative Press	4/5 stars
The A.V. Club	B−
Consequence of Sound	C
DIY	4/5 stars
Drowned in Sound	8/10
Exclaim!	6/10
The Line of Best Fit	8/10
Pitchfork	6.3/10
Sputnikmusic	4/5 stars

According to the review aggregator Metacritic, Not the Actual Events received "generally favorable reviews" based on a weighted average score of 74 out of 100 from 15 critic scores.

Jason Pettigrew of Alternative Press praised the record, describing it as "everything we would expect from Reznor and Ross, offering textures we’ve never visited and contexts with conscience." Consequence of Sound critic Zoe Camp thought that the EP "stands, alas, as a pyre dependent on the kindling of nostalgia, as opposed to innovation," and wrote: "between the abundant déja vu and the periodical redundancy, Not the Actual Events' purported 'impenetrability' manifests as a riotous retread instead." Pitchfork's Benjamin Scheim described it as "slight", but stated: "At moments it delivers the kind of visceral fury that NIN hasn't recreated since its mid-'90s Downward Spiral heyday." Sputnikmusic staff writer Raul Stanciu praised the record, writing: "The fairly impenetrable wall of sound Nine Inch Nails created here is admirable, especially since everything is presented in just over 21 minutes." AllMusic senior critic Stephen Thomas Erlewine thought that "it seems somewhat less than the sum of its parts -- maybe it's the brevity, maybe it's how the arrangements are more memorable than the melodies -- it's nevertheless worthy, not so much as a cacophonous palette cleanser after 2013's Hesitation Marks but as an effective demonstration of craft."

Ian Gormely of Exclaim! thought that "there is a more atmospheric quality to these songs that adds a sense of dread to the proceedings, pushing these songs beyond album filler material." Gormely also wrote that the tracks "felt like tentative first steps towards something bigger, rather than offering a bold new step in Reznor's long, winding career." The A.V. Club critic Dan Bogosian wrote: "Even with its moments of flawed excess, Not the Actual Events is so full of new ideas compared to the relatively 'this again?' nature of Hesitation Marks or The Slip that it deserves its place in the NIN catalog." Bogosian also stated that the release "might be the beginning of something greater." Describing the record as "probably the grimiest Nine Inch Nails release since The Fragile, Spin's Winston Cook-Wilson wrote: "Rather than running the gamut between overdriven steamrolling and receding, glitchy ambience as on most of the work Reznor loosed between 1994 and 2008, the EP realizes a specific, portentous mood from several equivalent angles."

== Track listing ==
All tracks are written by Trent Reznor and Atticus Ross.

No.	Title	Length
1.	"Branches/Bones"	1:46
2.	"Dear World,"	4:06
3.	"She's Gone Away"	6:00
4.	"The Idea of You"	3:26
5.	"Burning Bright (Field on Fire)"	5:50
Total length:		21:08

== Personnel ==
Credits adapted from the liner notes of Not the Actual Events.

Nine Inch Nails

- Trent Reznor – lead vocals, songwriting, performance
- Atticus Ross – songwriting, performance

Additional musicians

- Mariqueen Maandig – backing vocals (track 3)
- Dave Grohl – drums (track 4)
- Dave Navarro – guitars (track 5)

Technical personnel

- Tom Baker – mastering
- John Crawford – art direction
- Corey Holms – additional design
- Chris Holmes – engineering
- Dustin Mosley – engineering
- Alan Moulder – mixing
- Jun Murakawa – engineering
- Chris Richardson – engineering
- Atticus Ross – mixing

== Charts ==
=== Weekly charts ===
Chart (2016)	Peak position
Canadian Albums (Billboard)	47
New Zealand Heatseeker Albums (RMNZ)	1
US Billboard 200	26
US Independent Albums (Billboard)	3
US Top Alternative Albums (Billboard)	2
US Top Rock Albums (Billboard)	4

=== Year-end charts ===
Chart (2017)	Position
US Independent Albums (Billboard)	22
US Top Rock Albums (Billboard)	79
