= War Stories with Oliver North =

Former military history program on Fox News

- Starring: Oliver North
- Country of origin: United States
- Original language: English
- No. of episodes: 101 (list of episodes)

Production
- Executive producer: Pamela K. Browne
- Running time: 60 minutes

Original release
- Network: Fox News
- Release: September 30, 2001 – March 25, 2016

War Stories was a military history program on Fox News, hosted by Oliver North, a decorated Marine Corps officer, Vietnam war veteran, and key participant of the Iran–Contra affair. The program covered a number of different stories relating to war and national defense, featuring individuals who were directly involved with the topic covered in the episode.

Each episode focused on one of three areas:

- A particular noteworthy individual, such as George Patton or Douglas MacArthur
- A particular battle, such as the Battle of Hamburger Hill
- A segment devoted to a specific topic, such as the use of animals in the military or the Huey

The episodes were often based on current events; the episode which aired August 6, 2006 featured the history of Fidel Castro's rise to power (in light of Castro's temporary relinquishment of power) while the prior week's episode centered on Hezbollah.

North ends the episode with the tagline, "his/hers/theirs is a war story, that deserves to be told".

War Stories with Oliver North used to air on the weekends from 8-11 p.m. ET on Fox Business Network from January 2015 until its final episode in 2016 and its time slot was replaced by either infomercials or Cops reruns.

A new episode of War Stories with Oliver North was aired on Friday, March 25, 2016. The episode was titled War Stories: Fighting ISIS.

== DVD releases ==
Episodes from the series have been individually released on DVD.
