= Add Violence =

EP by Nine Inch Nails
- Released: July 19, 2017
- Genre: Industrial rock
- Length: 27:14
- Labels: The Null Corporation; Capitol
- Producers: Trent Reznor; Atticus Ross

Nine Inch Nails chronology
The Fragile: Deviations 1 (2016)	Add Violence (2017)	Bad Witch (2018)

Halo numbers chronology
Halo 30 (2016)	Halo 31 (2017)	Halo 32 (2018)

Singles from Add Violence
- 1. "Less Than" Released: July 13, 2017

Add Violence is the third EP and eleventh major release by the American industrial rock band Nine Inch Nails. Issued through the Null Corporation and Capitol Records on July 19, 2017, it is the second in a trilogy of releases, following the EP Not the Actual Events (2016) and preceding the band's ninth studio album Bad Witch (2018). It was produced by Trent Reznor and Atticus Ross.

Moving away from the more aggressive nature of Not the Actual Events, the EP focused more on soundscapes and textures alongside their traditional elements, similar to that of The Fragile (1999), which resulted in more longform compositions. The release was promoted with two singles: "Less Than" and "This Isn't the Place", along with their accompanying music videos. Add Violence received a positive response from critics, and reached No. 17 on the U.S. charts.

== Themes and composition ==
In an interview with Zane Lowe, Reznor said:

When we did Not the Actual Events, we were really seduced by the violence of it. The kind of throwing Hesitation Marks out the window and being unafraid to explore approaches we have in the past with the kind of, you know, punch in the face feel to it. And I think that the length of a five-song EP felt like the right length for that, you know? And to repeat that isn't as exciting anymore. It's like we did that. So now as we expand the lyrical viewpoint of this three song trilogy, the music that was interesting to us this time around kind of surprised us. And "Less Than" is not entirely representative of where the rest of the EP goes. So this collection of five songs feels like brothers.

== Critical reception ==
Professional ratings
Aggregate scores
Source	Rating
AnyDecentMusic?	7.1/10
Metacritic	77/100
Review scores
Source	Rating
AllMusic	4/5 stars
The A.V. Club	B−
Consequence of Sound	B
Drowned in Sound	8/10
The Independent	3/5 stars
The Line of Best Fit	8/10
Pitchfork	7.3/10
Rolling Stone	4/5 stars
Spin	7/10
Sputnikmusic	3.2/5

According to the review aggregator Metacritic, Add Violence received "generally favorable reviews" based on a weighted average score of 77 out of 100 from 13 critic scores. Gavin Miller from Drowned in Sound gave the EP a score of 8 out of 10, writing that "it's a little light on substance, but what we do get is a really fascinating insight into where Reznor is at with NIN at the moment". Kory Grow of Rolling Stone also gave the EP a positive review, saying that it "contains all the aggression, abjection and self-loathing that solidified Reznor's position as alt-rock's Original Angster but with the measured restraint of a man his age".

== Track listing ==
All tracks written by Trent Reznor and Atticus Ross.

No.	Title	Length
1.	"Less Than"	3:30
2.	"The Lovers"	4:10
3.	"This Isn't the Place"	4:44
4.	"Not Anymore"	3:08
5.	"The Background World"	11:44
Total length:		27:14

== Personnel ==
Credits adapted from liner notes.

Nine Inch Nails

- Trent Reznor – songwriting, arranging, production, programming, performance
- Atticus Ross – songwriting, arranging, production, programming, performance

Additional musicians

- Sharlotte Gibson – additional vocals ("Less Than")
- Allison Iraheta – additional vocals ("Less Than")

Technical

- 42 Entertainment – world integration and execution
- Tom Baker – mastering
- John Crawford – art direction
- Corey Holms – additional design
- Chris Holmes – engineering
- Church Lieu – additional concept development
- Dustin Mosley – engineering
- Alan Moulder – mixing
- Jun Murakawa – engineering
- Geoff Neal – engineering
- Chris Richardson – engineering

== Charts ==
Chart (2017)	Peak position
Australian Albums (ARIA)	44
Austrian Albums (Ö3 Austria)	67
Canadian Albums (Billboard)	15
New Zealand Heatseeker Albums (RMNZ)	4
Spanish Albums (PROMUSICAE)	74
Swiss Albums (Schweizer Hitparade)	36
US Billboard 200	17
US Independent Albums (Billboard)	1
US Top Alternative Albums (Billboard)	6
US Top Rock Albums (Billboard)	5

== Release history ==
Region	Date	Format(s)	Label	Ref.
Worldwide	July 19, 2017	Digital download	The Null Corporation/Capitol Records	
Worldwide	July 21, 2017	Streaming	The Null Corporation/Capitol Records	
Worldwide	September 1, 2017	CD	The Null Corporation/Capitol Records	
Worldwide	November 17, 2017	Vinyl	The Null Corporation/Capitol Records	
