= Nothing Records =

American record label

- Parent company: Universal Music Group
- Founded: 1992
- Founder: John Malm Jr. Trent Reznor
- Defunct: 2007
- Distributor: Interscope Records
- Genre: Industrial rock, electronic
- Country of origin: U.S.
- Location: Cleveland, Ohio; New Orleans, Louisiana; New York City, New York

Nothing Records was an American record label specializing in industrial rock and electronic music, founded by John Malm Jr. and Trent Reznor in 1992. It is considered an example of a vanity label, where an artist is able to run a label with some small degree of independence within a larger parent company, in this case the larger company being Interscope Records.

Nothing Records went largely defunct in 2004, after a lawsuit by Reznor against John Malm. The label became inactive as a whole following several further releases; 2007's Beside You in Time music video was the label's final release.

== Background ==
Nothing Records is most famous for its two original signings, Trent Reznor's own band Nine Inch Nails, and Marilyn Manson.

The label gained semi-iconic status within the industrial rock scene, and even acquired its own online-fanzine in Sick Among the Pure, although this later became a more general industrial fanzine, and ceased to exist at all in 2005. The Nothing label would often reward its fanbase over the Internet — one form of this outreach was Radio Nothing: an exclusive collection of free MP3 music streams, compiled by Nothing label artists, producers and fans.

In September 2004, coinciding with Trent Reznor leaving New Orleans for the west coast, the Nine Inch Nails website announced "nothing studios: 1994-2004", suggesting that Nothing Studios was closed. This later proved to be the end of the associated record label as well. Speculation among listeners that the label could continue ceased when Reznor successfully sued co-founder John Malm for fraud and breach of fiduciary duty (amongst others), ensuring that the Nothing era was over.

In a May 5, 2005 post to nin.com, Trent wrote, "To be clear: my involvement with Nothing Records is over. Is Nothing Records alive or an entity? You'd have to ask John Malm (we're not really speaking that much these days) ... Nothing studios is still in New Orleans and I'm not sure what I'll do with it. I'll figure that out when I finish touring."

While With Teeth and its following singles carry the Nothing Records logo, Reznor has publicly stated that this was at the insistence of John Malm.

Beside You In Time (February 2007) was the last release to carry the Nothing Records logo on its packaging. The logo also appears in the end credits.

The "Survivalism" single is the first Nine Inch Nails release not to be released with the Nothing Records logo.

Since early 2004, the official website, NothingRecords.com, has been closed down.

== Artists ==
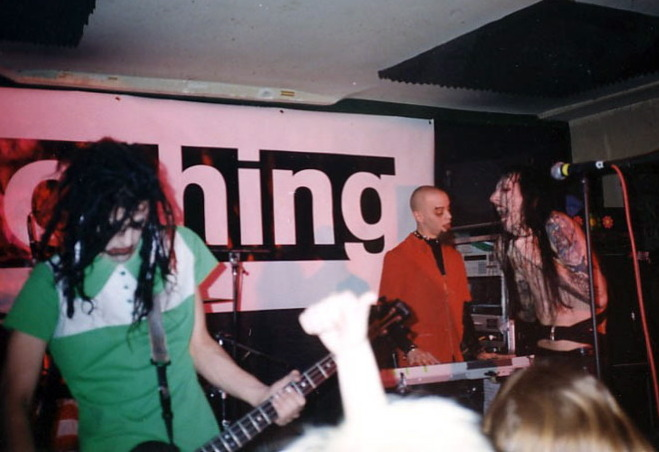
Marilyn Manson in 1995, performing during the label's "A Night of Nothing" showcase of Nothing Records acts.

In addition to Nine Inch Nails and Marilyn Manson, the label also signed and released albums from 2wo, Pig, Pop Will Eat Itself, Prick, 12 Rounds, Einstürzende Neubauten, The The, and Meat Beat Manifesto. Additionally, Coil was under contract for a record but it was never delivered (though some of the songs from the slated Nothing album appeared in reworked form on The Ape of Naples and The New Backwards). The album Backwards was eventually released in 2015 by Cold Spring Records. John Bergin was also signed briefly under the name Trust Obey, but the album he recorded ("Hands of Ash") was instead released in 1996 on Fifth Colvmn Records with a sticker that quoted Reznor's reaction to the completed work: "Not a great commercial potential."

Nothing also distributed music from Warp Records, Sheffield, England's venerable electronic music label, under an exclusive license in the U.S., with albums by Autechre, Plaid, and Squarepusher (although Warp's Aphex Twin appeared on the Further Down the Spiral release, he was already under a contract with Sire Records in the U.S. at the time). This distribution deal ended when Warp expanded operations into the U.S. market in 2001. Nothing also managed to secure the U.S. release of two albums from England's Blue Planet Recordings. The two albums were slightly different than the UK releases. Plug's "Drum and Bass for Papa" included an extra disc of tracks from earlier EPs, and The Bowling Green's "One Pound Note" omitted one track from the UK release due to problems with sample clearance.

== 1992-94: Early years ==
Nothing Records was founded by Trent Reznor and his former manager John Malm Jr. in 1992. Amid pressure from Nine Inch Nails' then-label TVT to produce a follow-up to Pretty Hate Machine, Reznor began to feel the label was hindering his control of the band and requested to terminate their contract, to which they ignored his plea. In response, Reznor secretly began recording under various pseudonyms to avoid record company interference. TVT ultimately put together a deal with Interscope Records (then part of Atlantic Records), in which they would still retain some financial stake, while Reznor worked creatively under a new label. However, Interscope President Jimmy Iovine looked to allow him more creative freedom. Reznor stated:

We made it very clear we were not doing another record for TVT. But they made it pretty clear they weren't ready to sell. So I felt like, well, I've finally got this thing going but it's dead. Flood and I had to record Broken under a different band name, because if TVT found out we were recording, they could confiscate all our shit and release it. Jimmy Iovine got involved with Interscope, and we kind of got slave-traded. It wasn't my doing. I didn't know anything about Interscope. And I was real pissed off at him at first because it was going from one bad situation to potentially another one. But Interscope went into it like they really wanted to know what I wanted. It was good, after I put my raving lunatic act on.

Part of the deal included allowing Reznor the run his own boutique label under the Interscope umbrella, which became Nothing Records. Reznor and Malm began a series of signings to the label, which included the likes of Marilyn Manson, Coil, Prick, Trust Obey, Pop Will Eat Itself and Mondo Vanilli. Reznor stated of the label, "The whole thing I want to do right now is provide a shell to other bands where they can have the benefit of a major label without being fucked with creatively in any way. Let them do what they want to do, make them aware of the business side of things how the money is spent." The label would go on to set up offices in Cleveland, Ohio and New York City, with a recording studio, Nothing Studios, in New Orleans.

=== Nine Inch Nails (Broken era) ===
The first release bearing the label's name was Nine Inch Nails' Broken EP. Released September 22, 1992, the EP marked their major label debut and consisted entirely of new material, departing from the electronica and synthpop style of Pretty Hate Machine and instead presenting a considerably heavier sound, which would act as a precursor for Nine Inch Nails' acclaimed second studio album, The Downward Spiral. The EP originally included a bonus 3" CD or 7" vinyl, depending which format was purchased, featuring two bonus songs; a cover of the Adam and the Ants song "Physical" and "Suck," a reworked version of a song Trent originally recorded with Pigface. Later pressings of the release merged these tracks as a single release, although a 2017 vinyl repress by the band once again pressed them as a separate 7".

The Broken film accompanied the EP, directed by Coil's Peter Christopherson. Reznor recalled, "Making the Broken movie was a lot of fun. There was no label involvement or pressure from anyone, it was just he (Christopherson) and I talking. At the completion of filming, Christopherson felt the footage was so realistic, he informed Reznor, "I'm going to send it to you, but it's going to show up in a paper bag unmarked because there could be ... I'm not sure I want the authorities knowing this came from me." After reviewing the film, Reznor stated, "It felt like we'd crossed over into territory that was perhaps too far. And to be honest, at that point I was living in the Sharon Tate house recording The Downward Spiral. Anyway, that's where I was living when this package turned up, and I thought, 'Enough. I don't know that I need this kind of thing.' With the house it felt too stunty, and Peter agreed."

Five of the eight total tracks were edited down into music videos, were widely censored from television airplay, due to their disturbing content. The complete, uncensored film was never officially released, however it was leaked as a bootleg, which became heavily traded on VHS in the 1990s and later became widely available via the Internet. "We shelved it, but little did we know that the Internet would come into existence, and it would find its home on there," stated Reznor. Most of the film's content was later included on the release of the band's 1997 VHS Closure. In 2006, an unofficial version of the film was released on a DVD disc image and distributed via BitTorrent at The Pirate Bay by an anonymous user called "seed0," who also uploaded a DVD version of Closure. The DVD image represented a significant upgrade in visual and audio quality from previous bootlegs and included the video for "Help Me I Am in Hell." It is widely believed by fans that Reznor himself was behind the 2006 leaks, as implied by a post on his official blog: "12/21/06 : Happy Holidays! This one is a guilt-free download. (shhhh - I didn't say that out loud). If you know what I'm talking about, cool."

Contributing to the band's growing mainstream success, the EP sold well upon release, peaking at number 7 on the Billboard 200 charts and eventually going platinum "Wish" won the 1993 Grammy Award for Best Metal Performance, as did "Happiness in Slavery" (live performance at Woodstock '94) in 1996. Despite their increasing commercial success, Trent opted against touring in support of the EP, choosing instead to remain at work in the studio.

A companion remix EP, Fixed, was released on December 7, 1992 and featured remixes from the band, as well as J. G. Thirlwell of Foetus, Butch Vig of Garbage and future Nothing label-mates Coil. An additional Butch Vig remix of "Last" was omitted from the EP, although the outro can be heard on "Throw This Away." The complete Vig remix circulated on the Internet as a bootleg file, until Reznor finally released it at remix.nin.com. Vig later addressed the reason for its omission, stating "I started recording a lot of new parts, and took it in a much different direction. When it was finished, Trent thought the front part of the mix didn't fit the EP, so he just used the ending. I'm glad it's on his website. Duke and Steve worked with me on the remix, in the very early days of Garbage."

=== Nine Inch Nails (The Downward Spiral era) ===
After Broken, Reznor began recording Nine Inch Nails' full-length debut for the Nothing / Interscope Records label, the seminal sophomore album, The Downward Spiral. For the recording of Broken, Reznor had moved into 10050 Cielo Drive in Benedict Canyon, Los Angeles, where actress Sharon Tate was murdered by members of the Manson Family. He named the home studio "Le Pig". Reznor would record The Downward Spiral at Le Pig, co-producing it with Flood. The recordings were inspired by concept albums such as David Bowie's Low and Pink Floyd's The Wall. Guitarist Richard Patrick had left the band after touring completed for Pretty Hate Machine, moving on to form his own band, Filter. Adrian Belew would take over guitar duties for much of the album, while Robin Finck would become the full-time guitarist for the band.

The first single from the album, "March of the Pigs," was released on February 25, 1994. The single featured remixes by Dave Ogilvie, as well as an exclusive instrumental, entitled "A Violet Fluid". A pair of music videos for the song were also shot. The first version was ultimately scrapped, while the second and final version was directed by Coil's Peter Christopherson. Portions of the original, incomplete video eventually surfaced as part of an online, DVD disc image version of the Closure DVD in 2006, which surfaced on BitTorrent website The Pirate Bay.

The Downward Spiral was released on March 8, 1994. The album was an immediate success, debuting at number two on the US Billboard 200 with sales of nearly 119,000 copies in its first week. It also garnered wide, critical acclaim, helping elevate Nine Inch Nails into one of the most successful rock acts of the 1990s. "Closer" became the second single for the album, released on May 30, 1994. The single included remixes from Nothing Records acts Coil and Meat Beat Manifesto, as well as an exclusive cover of Soft Cell's "Memorabilia." A music video for "Closer" was directed by Mark Romanek. Despite undergoing heavy censorship for television and radio airplay, the song received major airplay, becoming one of the biggest hits of NIN's career. The uncensored version of the music video was eventually released in 1997 on the band's Closure home video. "Piggy" and "Hurt" were both released as promotional singles to radio and received regular airplay. Nine Inch Nails also recorded a pair of exclusive songs for soundtracks. A cover of Joy Division's "Dead Souls was released on the soundtrack to The Crow, while an original track, "Burn," was recorded for the Natural Born Killers soundtrack. The latter also filmed a music video and the soundtrack was released on Nothing Records. A remix of "Closer" was also used in the opening credits to the David Fincher film Seven.

The album was promoted with the extensive Self Destruct Tour, which featured opening Nothing Records acts Marilyn Manson, Pop Will Eat Itself and Pig during various legs. Danny Lohner would join the band as full-time bassist for the tour. The tour included a set at Woodstock '94, which was broadcast on pay-per-view and featured the band performing while covered in mud. The performance went on to become one of the most famous of the band's career. In 1995, Nine Inch Nails embarked on a tour with David Bowie, with Nothing Records act Prick supporting as guest openers.

A companion remix album, Further Down the Spiral, was released in on June 1, 1995, which once again included contributions from Nothing act Coil, as well as Rick Rubin, J. G. Thirlwell and some original interludes by Aphex Twin. The album was certified gold by the Recording Industry Association of America (RIAA) on June 26, 1996, denoting sales in excess of 500,000 copies in the US.

Nine Inch Nails released the double VHS collection Closure on November 25, 1997. The first half documented the Self-Destruct Tour, while the second half compiled all of the band's music videos to that point. A DVD release was planned at one point, but never came to fruition. Instead, in 2006, an unofficial version was released on a DVD disc image and distributed via BitTorrent at The Pirate Bay by an anonymous user called "seed0." It is widely believed by fans that Reznor himself was behind the 2006 leaks, as implied by a post on his official blog: "12/21/06 : Happy Holidays! This one is a guilt-free download. (shhhh - I didn't say that out loud). If you know what I'm talking about, cool." As the title suggests, Closure marked the conclusion of The Downward Spiral era for the band.

A landmark release for the band, The Downward Spiral established Nine Inch Nails as a reputable force in the 1990s music scene, with its sound being widely imitated and Reznor receiving media hype and multiple honors. As of 2011, it was certified quadruple platinum and had sold 3.7 million copies in the United States. The Downward Spiral has been regarded by music critics and audiences as one of the most important albums of the 1990s and was praised for its abrasive, eclectic nature and dark themes, although it was scrutinized by social conservatives for its lyrics. For its tenth anniversary, the album was remastered and re-released on November 23, 2004 in high-resolution Super Audio CD (SACD) and DualDisc formats, with a second disc collecting many b-sides and rarities. In 2017, the band reissued the album on vinyl.

=== Marilyn Manson (Portrait era) ===
In the months following the momentum of The Downward Spiral, the next release from the label came from Marilyn Manson. One of the earliest signings to the label, Marilyn Manson first met Reznor in 1990, while enrolled as a student at Broward Community College in Fort Lauderdale, Florida. Warner was working towards a degree in journalism and gaining experience in the field by writing articles for a music magazine, 25th Parallel. One of his interviews for the magazine was with Reznor. Manson also performed as a local opener for Nine Inch Nails in July 1990 with his band, then known as Marilyn Manson and The Spooky Kids, at Club Nu in Fort Lauderdale, Florida (a show which also included future Nothing Records act Meat Beat Manifesto). Manson wound up giving Reznor a tape of his material.

Upon forming the Nothing Records imprint, Reznor called Manson and offered to sign him to the label, alongside an opening slot supporting Nine Inch Nails on their upcoming "Self Destruct Tour". At the time, Manson's band had been fielding offers from numerous record companies, including Madonna's Maverick label. Given the promise of total artistic freedom, the band opted to sign to Nothing Records.

Recording sessions for their debut studio album began in July 1993 with producer (and former Swans drummer) Roli Mosimann at Criteria Studios in Miami, Florida. Recording a selection of new songs, along with material from their Spooky Kids repertoire, the first version of their debut, titled The Manson Family Album, was completed by the end of September. However, it was not well received. The band's members, along with Reznor, felt Mosimann's production was flat, lifeless and poorly representative of the band's live performances. Seeking a more raw sound, Reznor agreed to rework production of The Manson Family Album in October 1993 at Record Plant Studios in Los Angeles. After seven weeks of mixing and re-recording, the album, retitled Portrait of an American Family, was presented to Nothing's parent label Interscope. The song "Filth" was dropped from the revised album, while the songs "Prelude (The Family Trip)" and "Wrapped In Plastic" were added. The song "Citronella" was renamed "Dogma". Several other minor musical and lyrical differences exist throughout the two versions, such as fewer Charles Manson samples being included in the song "My Monkey".

Upon delivery of the album, Interscope was receiving a lot of negative press for the content of artists on another label they were housing at the time, Death Row Records, and expressed some reservations about releasing the album, which they anticipated could be controversial. Reznor threatened to take the album to another label if necessary, at which time Interscope agreed to release it, on the condition that the band remove some photos from the album sleeve. The album's original cover art featured no text, simply a painting of a clown by John Wayne Gacy (the Gacy painting was later used as album art by the band Acid Bath for the album When the Kite String Pops in 1994). The sleeve photography included Polaroid pictures (faked by Manson and friends) of a mutilated female body, and a photo of what Manson described as "one of those dolls from the 60s and you pull a string on the back of it and the eyes get really big and they change colors." Manson also intended to use a picture of himself as a child sitting nude on a couch in the album's interior artwork. Though no genitalia was shown in the picture and it was taken by his own parents with no vulgar intent, the record label feared it would be misunderstood as child pornography. The ideas of using the Gacy artwork and the nude photos were ultimately dropped and, after a few months delay, the album was released on Nothing Records on July 19, 1994 and peaked at number thirty-five on Billboard's Top Heatseekers album chart, establishing the band as rising stars and a commercial success.

Originally, their song "Snake Eyes And Sissies" from Mosimann's The Manson Family Album sessions was intended to be the band's first single, with a single edit having been created. However, after the Reznor sessions, the album was instead led by the single "Get Your Gunn", followed by "Lunchbox" and "Dope Hat". The album was certified Gold on May 29, 2003 by the Recording Industry Association of America (RIAA) in the United States.

=== Natural Born Killers Soundtrack ===
During this time, in addition to recording with Nine Inch Nails and Marilyn Manson for the label, Reznor also worked on the soundtrack to Oliver Stone's controversial 1994 film, Natural Born Killers. Reznor oversaw the structure of the soundtrack, which included audio collages from the film and aimed to recreate the style the film itself. Reznor worked on the soundtrack using a portable Pro Tools in his hotel room. Reznor received a producer credit, but did not select the artists chosen for it (which was done by music supervisor Budd Carr). The soundtrack originally included the songs "A Warm Place" and "Something I Can Never Have" by Nine Inch Nails. A new composition from the band, "Burn", was recorded for the soundtrack, with a music video shot in the style of the film (although it was not directed by Stone). Reznor said of the experience:

I approached it with a bit of skepticism, because I'm not real keen on using my music in films. I went and saw this movie, an edit of it, and I was ... It just blew me away. I said, "What would the soundtrack be?" I didn't know if he was just going to pick the best fifteen or the most appropriate fifteen [songs]. So, I suggested to Oliver to try to turn the soundtrack into a collage of sound, kind of the way the movie used the music. Make edits of things, and add dialogue; make it something that was interesting rather than just a bunch of previously released music. And he looked at me and goes, "That's good. Yeah, do it."

The resulting soundtrack blended both previously released and unreleased material, spanning the genres of rock, punk, world music, country, hip-hop and more. It was released on August 23, 1994 to commercial and critical success. To date, the soundtrack has sold over 500,000 copies in the United States, making it a gold record. It was also named third best compilation album of 1995 by NME (December 24, 1994), and one of the "90 Best Albums of the 1990s" by Q magazine (December 1, 1999).

Nine Inch Nails' video for "Burn" was later included on the home video release of the Natural Born Killers: Director's Cut on VHS and laserdisc, but omitted from subsequent editions, such as DVD and blu-ray. The bonus features on the home video editions of the director's cut also included a behind-the-scenes featurette, in which Oliver Stone recollects his experiences working with Reznor on the film.

=== Pop Will Eat Itself ===
Capping off a successful year in 1994 at Nothing Records was the arrival of Pop Will Eat Itself, who were licensed by the label for Stateside release. Already established in the UK by the late 1980s, the band (sometimes referred to as PWEI or The Poppies) had a growing fanbase, with albums such as Box Frenzy, This Is the Day ... This Is the Hour ... This Is This!, Cure for Sanity and The Looks or the Lifestyle?. The latter album peaked at UK No. 15 and featured the Top 30 hit singles "Karmadrome" and "Bulletproof!" Despite healthy sales and successful touring, by January 1993, a shake-up at their longtime label RCA would lead to the band's biggest supporters leaving the company. The remaining executives did not understand the band or their music, suggesting that EMF 'write a hit' for them at one meeting. The band was dropped from the label before their "Get the Girl! Kill the Baddies!" single was released. It went on to peak at number 9 in the UK Singles Chart, becoming the band's biggest hit to date, also making them, at that time, the highest charting act to ever appear on Top of The Pops without a record deal.

In the wake of the RCA shake-up, Pop Will Eat Itself moved to Infectious Records in the UK. A call between PWEI and Nine Inch Nails management would lead to Nothing Records picking up licensing rights for the band in the United States. Former frontman Clint Mansell (who shared songwriting and vocal duties with Graham Crabb) recalled:

Trent had been a fan from the first album for RCA, This Is The Day, This Is The Hour, and he'd seen us play on our first tour in America in Cleveland, and we'd got to know his manager and he'd come and see us play whenever we were in America. And when we got dropped by RCA, my then-manager asked Trent's manager if he knew of labels that were actively looking, and he said "Well, strangely enough we've just started our own label and we'd like to sign you," and it was simple as that really.

Dos Dedos Mis Amigos was released on September 19, 1994 on Nothing Records. It marked a change in direction for the band, which had, until that time, featured a sound that blended hip-hop, electronic and alternative influences. Dos Dedos Mis Amigos took on a heavier, industrial rock sound. It was led by the singles "Ich Bin Ein Auslander", "Everything's Cool", "R.S.V.P." and "Underbelly". "Ich Bin Ein Auslander" was accompanied by a music video, which received some airplay on MTV. Around this same time, the band had a high-profile collaboration with The Prodigy, on the track "Their Law" from the album Music for the Jilted Generation. Dos Dedos Mis Amigos peaked at No. 11 in the UK Albums Chart and their single "Everything's Cool" became their ninth Top 30 UK hit. A Japanese edition of Dos Dedos Mis Amigos was released on Midi Music, which included four bonus tracks, all of which have since been released elsewhere by the band.

The band followed up Dos Dedos Mis Amigos with the Amalgamation EP, featuring remixes and additional tracks from the album sessions. The EP was picked up for US release on Nothing, which also released a promo-only single for R.S.V.P., featuring alternate mixes. However, there were several releases tied into the album in the UK that Nothing opted not to license for release in the States. Infectious Records released singles for "Ich Bin Ein Auslander", "R.S.V.P. / Familus Horribilus", "Everything's Cool" and "Underbelly", none of which received licensing from Nothing. Most notable of all was the remix album Two Fingers My Friends!, which featured acts such as The Orb, Feotus and Die Krupps remixing tracks from Dos Dedos Mis Amigos. The remix collection was released in Infectious in 1995 in both a single disc set, as well as a limited edition two-disc edition, featuring additional remixes. Two Fingers My Friends! was not picked up for US release by Nothing.

PWEI toured to promote the album and enjoyed a raised profile in the States, but at the end of touring, the band found themselves struggling to continue as a creative force. Work did begin on an untitled follow-up to Dos Dedos Mis Amigos, with the band entering the studio in 1996. Their sixth studio album, which had been intended for Stateside release via Nothing, would not see release before the band broke up, however. Member Graham Crabb quit the band to focus on his ambient project Golden Claw Musics. Members Richard March and Robert "Fuzz" Townshend went on to form the big beat band Bentley Rhythm Ace. Townshend also released two solo albums, while Clint Mansell would end up signing onto Nothing Records as a solo artist. Mansell stated:

I got to the point where I didn't really know what else we could do, but I don't think that was as much a factor as I just didn't feel very comfortable in it any more. I was 33 at the time, and playing songs that were written 10 years before, and it just seemed like this wasn't what I wanted to do; I didn't really know what I wanted to do, but I was just becoming more and more aware that I didn't want to do that.

Only two songs from the sixth album's recording sessions were released at the time, both on compilations. A cover of Gary Numan's "Friends" was included on the Numan tribute album Random on the Beggars Banquet label, while the song "Zero Return (Instrumental Mix)" was included on Future Music Magazine's June 1996 sampler FMCD June 1996, which also featured Nothing Records label-mates Meat Beat Manifesto.

Clint Mansell's time as a solo artist for the label would be short-lived, as his career as a film composer blossomed. While Mansell would appear on numerous releases for the label as a remixer and collaborator, as well as an appearance in 1996 on the label's "Nights Of Nothing" label showcase, performing with Nine Inch Nails (which included performances of some Pop Will Eat Itself songs), his planned solo album for Nothing was ultimately scrapped. Only two demos from Mansell's solo album ever surfaced. The songs "Atlantic Crossing" and "The Mechanic" found their way online, by way of Clint Mansell and Nothing Records' official websites (both since defunct). Mansell also put together a streaming mix for "Radio Nothing" on the Nothing Records website, which included "The Mechanic", alongside other tracks from the label. After Mansell's successful work composing the film π, he went on to become a full-time film composer, on such films as Requiem for a Dream, Doom (the soundtrack to which featured an exclusive Mansell remix of Nine Inch Nails' track "You Know What You Are"), The Fountain, The Wrestler, Moon, and Black Swan.

In January 2005, Pop Will Eat Itself reunited for a brief series of shows in the UK, which produced a number of Instant Live albums, whereby ten minutes after the completion of each gig, double live albums of the performance could be purchased. The band also released a preview of newly recorded material (not to be confused with their then-unreleased 1996 material), under the working title of Sonic Noise Byte in November 2005, via their official website, pweination. However, an announcement on the official website in March 2006 confirmed that Mansell and March would no longer be involved in the reformation of the band, due to other work commitments, effectively ending that conception of the PWEI reformation. However, the remaining band members continued as Vileevils, performing live, releasing re-recorded versions of several tracks from the Sonic Noise Byte sessions and releasing two EPs; Demon / Axe Of Men 2010 and Demon / Axe Of Men 2010 Remixes, both of which were credited as featuring Clint Mansell and Pop Will Eat Itself.

Vileevils performed their final live date in December 2008, before recording an unreleased album, which was cancelled prior to release in 2010. Instead, Pop Will Eat Itself finally reformed in 2011, with Graham Crabb serving as the band's only original member, while having the blessing of all the former members. Songs from both the abandoned Vile Evils album, as well as the abandoned Sonic Noise Byte album, were reworked and re-recorded for alongside new material for Pop Will Eat Itself's return album New Noise Designed by a Sadist, released in 2011 on Cooking Vinyl in the UK and Metropolis Records in the US.

The revived PWEI also began a series of reissues of their back-catalog, via the Cherry Red label. On October 7, 2013, the band re-issued Dos Dedos Mis Amigos on Cherry Red, featuring five rare bonus tracks, as well as a second disc; the unreleased 1996 album, now titled A Lick Of The Old Cassette Box. A Lick Of The Old Cassette Box was also released as a limited edition, stand-alone vinyl pressing that same year. Pop Will Eat Itself continues as a full-time project to this day, under the direction of Graham Crabb.

=== Mondo Vanilli ===
One act to depart during the early era of the label was Mondo Vanilli. Mondo Vanilli (sometimes referred to as MV Inc. or The Artists Formerly Known As Mondo Vanilli) was the brainchild of R. U. Sirius, an American writer, editor, talk show host, musician and cyberculture personality. Sirius was editor-in-chief of Mondo 2000, a glossy cyberculture magazine published in California during the 1980s and 1990s. It covered cyberpunk topics such as virtual reality and smart drugs, serving as a more anarchic and subversive predecessor to the later-founded Wired magazine. Sirius described the band as "a virtual reality band that would proudly lip-synch, or maybe not, even pretend to play live music on stage - perhaps we would exist totally in virtuality - or else we would do other, more original types of performance to our music." Sirius was backed by members Scrappi DüChamp, with whom he had collaborated on previous musical projects and would compose most of the music - and Simone Third Arm, a performance artist introduced to Sirius early into the project's inception.

Mondo Vanilli's involvement with Nothing Records came about through a chance meeting at Reznor's then-home at 10050 Cielo Drive, the site of the infamous Tate murders by members of the Manson Family in 1969. Sirius, a Northern California resident, had left Mondo 2000 three months prior and was visiting Los Angeles with some promotional Mondo Vanilli booklets and demo tapes, to shop them around the L.A. music scene. Sirius had been invited as a guest of Timothy Leary to a housewarming party at the grounds. It was there he met Reznor and gave him some of the Mondo Vanilli recordings, which included the songs "Love Is The Product", "Thanx!" and "Wraparound World." The day after the party, Reznor expressed interest in the band and discussed a deal singing them to Nothing Records. When the contract arrived, however, the band expressed some reservations. Sirius stated:

Well, the first thing that hit us in dealing with Nothing was the recording contract ... We received this contract to record six albums for Nothing. I think it came on an Interscope Records letterhead. And we send it to Cara (Burns, then acting attorney for the band) and she freaked. She said it was a typically terrible record industry contract of the sort the big record companies usually gave to new artists, maybe it was even a little worse than average ... Anyway, somehow we got word that Trent wanted us to find a producer and a studio and get ready to start recording and we'd all deal with the contract later. We would have $90k to record it. So we scheduled recording time with Jonathan Burnside at Razor's Edge studio. And then Malm got in touch and he didn't want to commit to the full album. He wanted us to go into the studio with $10k instead and record two songs and "see how it goes." So there was clearly this attitude with Reznor's management that we were sort of "Trent's folly" or maybe all of the Nothing artists were viewed that way, except probably Marilyn Manson, since he already had a pretty big following in Florida. So we recorded "Gimme Helter" and "Thanx!" Anyway, the two songs knocked everybody's socks off. So we were given the go ahead to record the whole album.

Recording commenced on the album at San Francisco's Razor's Edge Studios. The finished album, titled IOU Babe was completed in late 1993 and delivered to the label. However, the album was met with resistance from the label. Sirius recalled, "We finished the album right around the end of 1993. In fact, the timing was such that we went to a NIN show in Oakland and handed in the final product in person to his management. This time, we weren't invited into the dressing room and Reznor never came out to speak to us. I think it was maybe a few weeks after that Tony Ciula from Nothing Records told us that Interscope was making Nothing drop all their artists except NIN and Marilyn Manson but that we could have the album gratis."

The band suddenly found themselves without a label, having been dropped by Nothing. The final recording contract between the two parties had never been signed. However, upon requesting a formal notice of their release from the label, the situation became further complicated and it seemed the band would be unable to shop the album elsewhere. Sirius stated, "When our lawyer asked for a formal notification of this (release from the label), the Interscope lawyer told us that they weren't going to give us the rights to the music unless some other record company paid off their full bill ... and I think they had some other demands as well. In our position, we would have had to have gone to small indie labels, so it was pretty much impossible."

In the wake of the fallout from the label, the band took to publicly criticizing Nothing and Reznor for a time, posting an article called "True Story of Brent Buzzkill and MV Inc," using pseudonyms and parody to recall their side of the story in their experiences with the label. They also recorded a new track for the IOU Babe album, "The Ballad of Brent Buzzkill", aimed at Reznor and the label. Sirious reflected, "Maybe he (Reznor) didn't really get the album, as a whole. We heard he liked some of it. He also went into a well-publicized ... ahem ... downward spiral around that time. And we did make merciless fun of him for a few years after it all happened ... We were pretty mean!"

The band ended up posting the album online for free, originally via member Scrappi DüChamp's now-defunct website. It the years to follow, the album would disappear and reappear online, through numerous outlets, such as Bandcamp, SoundCloud, Internet Archive and The Pirate Bay, with slightly revised track lists. In 2011, the band stated on their Bandcamp website that a CD edition of the album was forthcoming, though to date, it has never materialized. Trent Reznor was given an unfeigned special thanks in later editions of the IOU Babe album credits.

== 1995-96: Expansion of the label ==
=== Prick ===
1995 was kicked off by the arrival of Prick, led by Reznor's longtime friend and collaborator, Kevin McMahon. Prior to Nothing Records, the two musicians first crossed paths in the 1980s Cleveland music scene. McMahon, a Cleveland native, had spent much of the 1970s and 1980s fronting the rock band Lucky Pierre there, while in 1985, Reznor began performing with another local act called Exotic Birds . Exotic Birds was led by future Prick drummer Andy Kubiszewski (and even featured future Nine Inch Nails member Chris Vrenna for a short time). By 1988, Reznor had left Exotic Birds and joined Lucky Pierre. His time there would be likewise abbreviated, due to his desire to start his own project. However, he remained on long enough to appear on Lucky Pierre's 1988 Communiqué 12" EP, performing on the tracks "Communiqué" (an alternate version of which had been released as a 7" single four years prior in 1984, which did not feature Reznor) and "I Need To Get To Know". Lucky Pierre was also being managed at the time by John Malm. Reznor left the band shortly thereafter and went on to begin work on Nine Inch Nails' debut album, Pretty Hate Machine, hiring Malm as his manager in the process.

Meanwhile, McMahon also switched gears musically, moving to Los Angeles to begin what would become Prick. Rounding out the initial incarnation of the band was guitarist Chris Schleyer and former Exotic Birds member Andy Kubiszewski on drums, though the latter would intermittently drop in and out of the fold over the years to come, taking on duties with numerous other bands, including future Nothing Record act The The. By 1994, Prick's live band consisted of Kevin McMahon on vocals and guitar, Chris Schleyer on lead guitar, Sebastien Monney on bass, Brian Kehew on keyboards and Sean Furlong on drums, performing for a short time under the name Riverhead in clubs around Los Angeles.

By this time, Reznor himself had relocated to Los Angeles, where he was soon to begin work on The Downward Spiral. McMahon and Reznor agreed to spend some time in the studio together, revisiting some of the old Lucky Pierre material and recording new versions of "Communique", "Tough", "Other People" (previously known as "I Need To Get To Know") and "No Fair Fights". The songs were not yet intended for any specific project or label. "We were just doing it to do music," stated McMahon. Aware of the collaboration's resemblance in sound to Nine Inch Nails, McMahon opted to embrace Trent's contributions, rather than try to avoid common ground. McMahon stated, "Trent was the other part of the band on the songs that he produced. He and I were the band, so there's going to be some kind of similarity there. I'm certainly not going to ask him to not do what he does best, so that I won't have any indication of any sound like that."

McMahon would go on to sign Prick to a contract with Interscope Records. He began work on a debut album, flying to London to record material with producer Warne Livesey. After completing recording, the album was shelved at Interscope for an extended period, to the degree that Andy Kubiszewski, who was back with the band at this time, performing drums on the album, opted to take an offer to tour with Stabbing Westward. McMahon began to feel he wasn't getting what he wanted out of Interscope, at which time he reconnected with Reznor and Malm and Prick was moved under the Nothing Records umbrella.

At least two of the Livesey produced tracks were ultimately cut from the album, although they would later surface of future McMahon projects. "Attitude" and "Johnny Goes To Paris" appeared on Lucky Pierre's 2004 ThinKing album, while drummer Andy Kubiszewski stated an early version of "Actress" was also recorded with Livesey during the original album sessions. It later appeared on Prick's The Wreckard album. In lieu of the cut songs, McMahon's recent material with Reznor was added. The album was finally on track for release, with a promo 7" for Communique / Crack surfacing in 1994, while the full-length, self-titled album followed on February 7, 1995. The album was led by the single "Animal", which received moderate airplay on MTV and alternative radio and was featured on the soundtrack to the film Showgirls. It went on to sell over 66,000 copies.

Prick toured the album, supporting such acts as Ned's Atomic Dustbin, Lords Of Acid and My Life With The Thrill Kill Kult. Garrett Hammond replaced Andy Kubiszewski on drums, while frequent Nine Inch Nails collaborator Dave Ogilvie was hired for live programming. Prick was then invited to their largest showcase yet, as openers for Nine Inch Nails' and David Bowie's 1995 co-headlining Outside Tour. In 1996, McMahon played guitar with Nine Inch Nails for three shows on "Nights of Nothing" showcase, which included two Prick songs ("Animal" and "Tough") as part of NIN's set.

As the promotional cycle for Prick's debut album winded down, McMahon began to feel discomfort with the increased spotlight, stating "I'm not comfortable with the fame thing, even just walking out after a show and having somebody recognize me or anything like that, because I kind of just am there on stage when I'm on stage or in the studio. That's sort of when I do whatever I do. The other times I'm just kind of looking around like everybody else. I don't want to have to be anything that somebody expects me to be. I just think that once that starts, it's the beginning of deterioration of the person." Differences were also mounting with Nothing/Interscope, due in part to McMahon feeling they were putting a greater emphasis on their expanding roster, while diminishing their focus on Prick. McMahon recalled:

Interscope was a young enough company where they were saying, "We have only 12 artists, and it's not like we're going to be throwing out 15 a month and see what sticks. We're going to try to pay attention to you. As time passed, the record came out, they signed more and more people, and all of a sudden, the idea of me doing a record every year or every 18 months turned into, "Well, there's no commercial radio hit here anymore, you need to do a commercial radio kind of thing."

In spite of the growing differences, McMahon set about plans of recording a follow-up, double-album of Prick material for Nothing, under the working title of Numb. However, Nothing management pulled the plug at the last minute, requesting McMahon do additional work on the album to make it more radio friendly. McMahon stated, "The day before I was supposed to begin recording the second album, the label decided they didn't want to do it. They wanted more radio-friendly songs. And since I don't listen to the radio, I didn't know what they were talking about. I can't write songs that someone wants me to write."

With the two parties at an impasse, Prick would quietly part ways with the Nothing Records. In spite of this, McMahon left in good standing with both Reznor and Malm. "There was never any real blowout with Trent," McMahon stated. John Malm expressed his admiration for McMahon as well, but noted, "I think that he didn't take well to the major label situation."

In the subsequent years, McMahon quietly recorded on and off, while attempting to reacquire publishing rights to his new material. After successfully doing so in 1999, McMahon surfaced online with an MP3 of a new track, "Wetcat," in late 2000. Two more tracks, "I Know It's Gonna Hurt" and "Cloud", followed in 2001 (the latter ultimately surfacing on Lucky Pierre's ThinKing album). Opting not to shop his material to new labels, McMahon instead chose to self-release. In 2002, Prick finally announced their sophomore album, The Wreckard, to be released online via McMahon's own Lucky Pierre Music. The album featured two tracks produced by Warne Livesey, "Into My Arms" and "Tomorrow", both of which were recorded in 1997, as well as "Wetcat" and "I Know It's Gonna Hurt." McMahon assembled a live band to support the album, consisting of Greg Zydyk on guitar, (Lucky Pierre bandmate) Tom Lash on bass and Andy Kubiszewski once again on drums. They performed a small run of regional shows around the Midwest and Eastern US, from late 2002 into 2003.

In 2004, McMahon returned to Lucky Pierre, with the album ThinKing, which included the two tracks originally cut from Prick's 1995 debut, as well as the track "Cloud", which had surfaced three years prior as an MP3. ThinKing marked Lucky Pierre's first full-length album ever, nearly 30 years after their formation.

After another period of silence, in 2009, McMahon returned with his largest wave of material to date. In addition to reissues of The Wreckard and ThinKing, both featuring upgraded packaging, Prick's first live album was released, Boston Live, as well as a self-titled compilation of the bulk of Lucky Pierre's back-catalog. Two additional McMahon projects also saw release at this time. Fear Of Blue was a more electronic-based project, recorded in 1990 by Kevin McMahon and Ray DiLeo, while ( sic ), a rock-based project, featured McMahon, Andy Kebiszewski, Greg Zydyk and Mark Gamiere. Released as an EP, ( sic )'s Standard Idiom Communiqué included the track "Runaway Brain," which had also previously surfaced online as an MP3.

In early 2010, the Lucky Pierre Music website closed down, with a message stating, "Hello Friends / Fans, While LPM is expanding its content of new and vintage music and merch available to you at our store, and as we work to develop the best ways and means of reaching any and all those interested, we have decided to close the site for an indefinite amount of time to facilitate this effort." To date, Prick has not publicly surfaced since. However, in 2017, Interscope Records released Prick's 1995 self-titled debut on vinyl for the first time.

=== Trust Obey ===
By 1995, Trust Obey completed their first album for Nothing Records, Hands Of Ash, though it would never see release though the label. Trust Obey is John Bergin, an illustrator, designer, writer, filmmaker and musician. Originally a Pennsylvania native, Bergin had been "drawing and painting for as long as I can remember." By 1984, while attending the University of the Arts in Philadelphia (from 1984 - 1988), Bergin began experimenting in music, citing such acts as Swans and future Nothing Records act Einstürzende Neubauten as influences. Trust Obey was founded in 1988 in Kansas City, Missouri, beginning as a one-man project with a series of self-released cassettes; Fucking The Wound (1989), Rip Saw (1989), Locust (1990), The Veil (1990), Room 101 (1991) and Exit Wound (1991). In 1993, Bergin added guitarist Brett Smith as a permanent member of the band, in order to accommodate live performances.

By 1994, Bergin had become heavily immersed in the graphic design and comic book worlds and Trust Obey was commissioned to compose music to accompany James O'Barr's graphic novel, The Crow. Timed to coincide with the release of the Alex Proyas directed motion picture starring Brandon Lee, the graphic novel was released in a special hardcover edition on Kitchen Sink Press and Graphitti Design and included Trust Obey's companion CD album, Fear And Bullets. At this time, O'Barr even claimed to have joined on as a member of Trust Obey, however, his only credited appearance on any Trust Obey release would be contributing some lyrics to the song "The Crow" on the Fear And Bullets album.

Trent Reznor would also have involvement with The Crow franchise, on the motion picture side of things, delivering a Nine Inch Nails cover of Joy Division's "Dead Souls" for the hit soundtrack. Reznor would hear the Fear And Bullets album and offer Trust Obey a five-album contract with Nothing Records, making them one of the earliest acts signed to the label. In an interview on the bootleg Nine Inch Nails disc, Disturbed, Reznor discussed singing Trust Obey, noting that the band was "not a great commercial potential."

Working on the film score to The Crow were composer Graeme Revell and Brian "Lustmord" Williams (as a "musical sound designer"), both of whom went on to become friends with John Bergin through their mutual association with the franchise (Bergin went on to design art for releases with both Revell and Lustmord). Nothing Records expressed interest in signing composer Graeme Revell to release his score to The Crow film, which would be paired with a reissue of Trust Obey's Fear And Bullets graphic novel compositions and released together as a double album. However, Brian Lustmord expressed reservations about such a partnership. Bergin explained:

"Nothing Records was interested in releasing my Trust Obey Crow soundtrack and Graeme (Revell)'s Crow film score as a double CD. At the time Graeme didn't have a label for this work, so he was into the idea. Back then Brian (Lustmord) had first said to me "oh ... Nothing records ... Nine Inch Nails ... I'll say no more." He wasn't too excited about the notion of associating with Trent's label. He was right. The whole idea of the double CD fell apart."

With plans for the Graeme Revell/Trust Obey joint release scrapped, Revell's score was ultimately released instead on the Varèse Sarabande soundtrack label, while Trust Obey entered the studio in the spring of 1995 to begin recording an album of new material for Nothing Records. The resulting album, Hands Of Ash, was delivered to the label, where it was met with apprehension. The album remained shelved for an extended period, before Bergin became frustrated with the situation and the parties agreed to part ways in February 1996, with Bergin retaining the rights to the Hands Of Ash album.

In the wake of Trust Obey's departure from Nothing Records, Brian McNelis of Lakeshore Entertainment would put Bergin in touch with Jared Louche of the industrial rock band Chemlab. Bergin met with Louche in Chicago, while he was recording Chemlab's East Side Militia album. Louche at the time was serving as general manager for Fifth Colvmn Records and requested Bergin send him some material for release consideration.

Fifth Colvmn Records would opt to pick up Hands Of Ash, as well as another project of Bergin's, C17H19NO3 (the source of name being the chemical formula for morphine), for the Terra Damnata album. Hands Of Ash was released on August 2, 1996 on Fifth Colvmn Records, bearing a sticker on the CD jewel case, featuring Reznor's "Not a great commercial potential" quotation on the cover. The album's liner notes also included mention of Reznor and Nothing Records in the credits, stating, "Thanks to Trent and Nothing for something."

Bergin would go on to form numerous other music projects, such as Orifice, Blackmouth, Tertium Non Data, Lolo and Camouflaged Abominations. He also performed as a member of Paved In Skin and had a short stint as a member of the industrial rock supergroup Pigface. Pigface was led by musician Martin Atkins, who also ran Invisible Records. On October 28, 1999, Invisible Records reissued Trust Obey's Fear And Bullets album, with reworked versions of the original graphic novel tracks, as well as one song being added ("A Murder Of Crows") and one song removed ("Don't Look"). In 2001, Invisible also released C17H19NO3's Terra Null double album (the second disc of which was a reissue of the Terra Damnata album).

Bergin is currently the art director at Lakeshore Records, where he has been involved in creating the artwork for hundreds of releases. He has also created numerous comic book series, including Ashes, Golgothika and Wednesday. For his graphic novel work, Bergin was nominated for the Harvey Award for Best New Talent in 1991. Through the 1990s, Bergin created short comics and illustrated titles for Heavy Metal Magazine, Marvel, DC and Dark Horse Comics. In the mid-90s, Bergin collaborated with James O'Barr, working as creative talent for Tundra, where in addition to The Crow, they produced Bone Saw, IO and From Inside. In 2008, Bergin directed an animated feature-length film adaptation of From Inside, which won numerous awards and screened at over 50 international film festivals, including SITGES (Best Animated Feature), Fantasia Film Festival (Jury Prize), Utopiales (Grand Prix) and Future Film Festival of Italy. From Inside was released on home video in October 2014.

In 2015, Trust Obey reissued Hands Of Ash digitally, via Bergin's own Stompbox13 label. Missing from the release was the final track, "Larvatus," though it was included as a bonus track on Stompbox13's Bandcamp edition, as well as the previously unreleased song "Malice Buried," which serves as part two of the song "Hands Of Malice." Bergin continues to use Stompbox13 as the primary outlet for his musical output.

=== Meat Beat Manifesto (Subliminal Sandwich era) ===
Meat Beat Manifesto would have many encounters with Trent Reznor in the years leading up to their arrival on Nothing Records. However, the partnership was born out of a dark period for the group, due to difficulties with their European label, Play It Again Sam. Meat Beat Manifesto, originally the duo of Jack Dangers and Johnny Stephens, struggled to find any labels willing to support them in the UK throughout their formative years in the late 1980s. This prompted the band to accept an unfavorable deal with Belgian label Play It Again Sam. Jack Dangers recalled, "I couldn't get a label to sign me in the UK, and that's why I ended up in a disastrous contract with Belgian label PIAS (Play It Again Sam)." In spite of this, the deal sparked interest from many labels in the US. Venerable imprints such as Wax Trax! Records and Mute Records would license the band's early material in the United States, such as Storm the Studio, Armed Audio Warfare, 99% and Satyricon, which gave MBM an increased Stateside following. Dangers reflected, "I remember going to see Mute Records in 1988 and they weren't interested in the slightest in what I was doing. Two years later they were running all over the world to sign me for the American end of the deal because PIAS only had me signed for Europe. It's funny how two years prior they wouldn't even listen to my records."

Their early work would capture the attention of Trent Reznor, leading to an invitation in 1990 for Meat Beat Manifesto to perform as openers during Nine Inch Nails' Hate '90 tour (a tour which also included a guest appearance from one of the earliest incarnations of Marilyn Manson, who performed as local openers when the tour ran through Florida). Meat Beat Manifesto were also invited to remix Nine Inch Nails, first on the Closer To God remix disc in 1994, followed by The Perfect Drug in 1997 (the former also featured Nothing Records act Coil, while the latter also featured Nothing act Plug).

In 1993, Dangers relocated from England to San Francisco, California and began work on a follow-up to 1992's Satyricon. By this time, Dangers had become the sole, constant member of the band and recording of the subsequent album, Subliminal Sandwich, would mark a dark time in his life, due in part to the death of his father, as well as increasing tension with his label, PIAS. Dangers stated, "Subliminal Sandwich was done while I was in the middle of trying to get out of my label deal, which is always a bad thing, so I just made the best of a terrible thing and did a double album. I was just waiting to get out of that miserable, boring, heard-it-all-before stuff."

Throughout the recording of Subliminal Sandwich, the band faced uncertainty regarding their Stateside distribution. Mute Records was in the process of downsizing, while their licensing contract with Play It Again Sam was likewise nearing its conclusion. A US 12" single for Nuclear Bomb from the Subliminal Sandwich sessions made it as far as the test pressing stage at Mute in late 1995, before plans for a commercial release were scrapped.

MBM's North American licensing via Mute soon lapsed and the band found themselves without U.S. distribution, paving the way for Nothing Records to begin licensing their work in the United States in 1996. Subliminal Sandwich was released as a double album on June 4, 1996 on Nothing Records. The album was led by a cover of the World Domination Enterprises song "Asbestos Lead Asbestos," which was released as commercial single in Europe on PIAS and as a promo only CD/12" single on Nothing in the US. A video for the song also received minor US airplay on MTV. Additionally, a single for Transmission was released in Europe on PIAS, though it was not picked up for US release by Nothing.

Meat Beat Manifesto would support Subliminal Sandwich with extensive touring across the United States and Europe, featuring a line-up of Jack Dangers, John Wilson on guitar, Lynn Farmer on drums and Mike Powell on samples and keys. In 1996, the band took part in the "Nights Of Nothing" label showcase, which featured label-mates Marilyn Manson and Nine Inch Nails, with the latter's line-up including Clint Mansell of Pop Will Eat Itself and Kevin McMahon from Prick.

The band would go on to become one of the more prolific acts on Nothing, releasing many additional titles in the years to follow, as well as helping reshape the sound of the label. However, Dangers and Reznor maintained a mostly professional relationship throughout their tenure, with Dangers stating, "I was never really hanging out with Trent. I don't know if that was the perception." Despite the fact the band was only ever licensed via Belgian label PIAS, Meat Beat Manifesto's relationship with Nothing Records was considered a positive one, with Dangers describing Nothing Records at the time as "the best label we've ever been a part of."

=== Pig ===
In 1994, Nine Inch Nails invited Pig to open a series of shows in London during the European leg of their Self Destruct Tour. By this time, Raymond Watts, founder of Pig, had firmly established himself in the industrial scene as a founding member of KMFDM (though he would come and go from the band's line-up, opting to focus on Pig), as well as a collaborator with such acts as Psychic TV, Foetus and future Nothing Records act Einstürzende Neubauten. Pig's earliest work had seen release via the seminal Wax Trax! Records. However, much of his output, which included A Poke in the Eye ... With a Sharp Stick!, Praise the Lard, A Stroll in the Pork and The Swining, was scattered across numerous labels around the world and often proved difficult to find. Much of his output by the mid-90s had become released exclusively in Japan, where Watts had garnered a respectable fanbase.

Reznor was familiar with most of Watts' scattered body of work and during their encounters Europe, Watts gave Reznor a copy of his latest album, Sinsation, which was released in 1995 on Japanese label Victor Entertainment. When Watts came to the United States to work with KMFDM on their Nihil album and tour, the band would meet up with Reznor in New Orleans (where then-KMFDM member En Esch was living at the time). Soon after, Trent would suggest to release Pig in the US on Nothing Records. Watts explained, "I met Trent very briefly in London and the next time he was back he asked me and my band (Pig) to open up for quite a few of their (Nine Inch Nails) European shows. He was aware that there had been sporadic Pig releases on different labels, because I moved about a bit. He was obviously aware of the Sinsation album, because I'd given him a copy of it somewhere along the line and then last year, when I was out with KMFDM, we met again and it was just a little bit after that that it was suggested that it might be possible to work together with regard to getting it out on Nothing."

Watts accepted a deal to license Sinsation to Nothing Records, where it was released on September 17, 1996. However, the album received only minor promotional support from Nothing/Interscope. One such instance of insufficient promotion involved a music video for the band's single, Paniac. The video, which had already been shot and received airplay in Japan, was delivered to MTV for airplay in the States. However, the video featured heavy use of fire, which was a sensitive issue for the network at the time, due to controversy over the Beavis and Butt-Head show, which had been accused of provoking a child to light fire to his home. The network requested the video be edited in order to receive airplay, which would have cost only a minor amount for Interscope. In spite of this, they declined to finance the edit. Watts stated, "We had a really good video for Painiac, the one with the flames and shit and MTV didn't want to show it unless we edited it. It would have cost $2,000 to edit it and Interscope, in their infinite wisdom, thought that it wasn't worth the investment. I think they wanted a couple of things taken out. And Interscope was running things for Nothing. It was really nice that Nothing wanted to put out our records, but they're busy dealing with this shit (focusing on the larger acts), and we had everyday Interscope people dealing with our shit." A single for Painiac was also released in Japan in 1995 on Victor Entertainment, which was not licensed for release by Nothing Records.

While Pig had an open-ended agreement with Nothing, which included the possibility of more Pig material being licensed to the label, Watts began to feel that, in spite of being shepherded by a major label, Nothing was in fact a very small operation and was only able to focus most of their energy on their largest acts. Watts stated, "they were too busy with other artists and I expected a little bit more feedback from a label on which I was signed." Despite having a follow-up album, entitled Wrecked, already completed by the time Nothing released Sinsation in the United States, Watts felt the label showed minimal interest in it, explaining:

Trent had known about Pig for a long time and basically thought that it might be a good idea to raise the profile. And it seemed to be something that might be a good gesture, because we didn't get releases here and it raised the profile. But in fact, they were a small label, and they've got very big artists to work with, like Manson, which became a huge, huge act. They've got big artists to deal with. And being kind of small and obscure and stuff, we felt mutually that they had gotten the ball rolling for Pig in the States here and there was this other album (Wrecked) to release and this tour (with KMFDM) came up, and we mutually agreed that maybe other people could be more pro-active in the Pig situation. So we just went, "Well we did this one, that's great, thanks a lot, these people (at Wax Trax!) can probably put more into it.

Pig left Nothing Records in 1997 under amicable terms, returning to Wax Trax! Records to release Wrecked in the United States (which had likewise been licensed from Japanese label Victor Entertainment, who first released the album in 1996). Pig followed this with a national tour of the US, opening for KMFDM in late 1997. In the wake of the Wax Trax! label folding, Pig went on to release numerous albums via Metropolis Records in the US, such as Genuine American Monster, Pigmata and The Gospel.

=== Marilyn Manson (Antichrist Superstar era) ===
Winding down promotion on their debut album, Portrait of an American Family, Marilyn Manson initially planned a remix single for the track "Dope Hat." However, various contributions by engineer and Skinny Puppy producer Dave Ogilvie and Nine Inch Nails then-live keyboardist Charlie Clouser, combined with new material by the band, resulted in an eclectic and unusual combination and it was decided to expand the release into an EP. Leading up to it in spring of 1995, Marilyn Manson took an opening slot with the band Danzig. The tour was rife with drug binges and unusual backstage escapades, many of which were the genesis for ideas which became the Smells Like Children EP.

The band was once again produced by Trent Reznor. Smells Like Children was full of recordings from backstage on the Danzig tour, as well as samples from the films Willy Wonka & the Chocolate Factory and Chitty Chitty Bang Bang (the EP derives its title in reference to the latter), as well as distorted clips of the band's appearance on The Phil Donahue Show. An early version of the EP, which had not cleared the rights for its audio samples, was mistakenly pressed by Nothing/Interscope and distributed as a promo release. Upon realizing their mistaken, unauthorized film samples, as well as other sound bites considered too extreme, Interscope insisted the EP's track listing be revised for public release. The final, commercial release removed the original opening track, "Abuse, Part 1 (There is Pain Involved)," featuring the voices of Manson and Danzig/Pantera tour bus driver Tony F. Wiggins, as they attempted to calm down a masochistic girl, and "Abuse, Part 2 (Confessions)," featuring an interview with a teenage girl who confesses to molesting her seven-year-old male cousin. These tracks were replaced by "The Hands of Small Children" and "May Cause Discoloration of the Urine or Feces," respectively. Speaking about the promo edition, Manson stated in his autobiography:

The only solace was that through some unfortunate error someone at the record pressing plant made several thousand copies of our original version of the album, thinking it was the new one. Without even listening to them, the record company sent them out as promotional copies to radio stations and journalists before realizing their mistake. Now, they are available to anyone who wants to hear them on the Internet. Though someone at the label actually accused me of plotting it, I wish I was that resourceful. God, however irrelevant he may be to me, works in mysterious ways.

The final EP did still feature some backstage debauchery from the Danzig tour, for which Interscope demanded written affidavits from the participants in the sound bites, certifying their consent to be recorded. However, most notable on the EP was the band's cover version of Eurythmics' 1983 hit "Sweet Dreams (Are Made of This)", which was released as a single, despite Manson claiming Nothing Records was resistant to doing so. Despite this, the song became a major hit on radio and MTV, eventually being nominated at the MTV Video Music Awards for Best Rock Video and helping launch the band into mainstream success. Smells Like Children was certified Platinum by the Recording Industry Association of America (RIAA).

Marilyn Manson's success in the wake of their hit single "Sweet Dreams (Are Made of This)" helped garner much anticipation for their follow-up, sophomore album, Antichrist Superstar. Trent Reznor once again came on board as producer, while Manson, Sean Beavan and Dave Ogilvie shared co-production duties. Members of both Marilyn Manson and Nine Inch Nails also participated in production duties. The album was recorded at Reznor's Nothing Studios in New Orleans. The process of making the album was long and difficult, involving experiments in sleep deprivation and near-constant drug use, in an effort to create a violent and hostile environment suited to the album's content. During this time, antagonism between band members was high, which caused the departure of guitarist and co-founding member Daisy Berkowitz, with Twiggy Ramirez performing much of the album's guitar work as a result.

Antichrist Superstar, a rock opera concept album was released on October 8, 1996. It was led by the single The Beautiful People, which became a major hit on the alternative rock charts, being awarded gold record certification by the International Federation of the Phonographic Industry (IFPI), reaching number twenty-six on the US Billboard and number eighteen in the UK. The music channel VH1 named it number twenty-eight of their 40 Greatest Metal Songs. Antichrist Superstar debuted at number three on the Billboard 200 with first-week sales of 132,000 copies. Manson also appeared on the cover of Rolling Stone, who awarded the band their "Best New Artist" accolade in 1997. The year long "Dead to the World Tour" followed, which was the band's longest and largest tour yet.

Meanwhile, the band was also reaching new heights of controversy, finding themselves the target of congressional hearings, led by Senator Joseph Lieberman, to determine the effects, if any, of violent lyrics on young listeners. Lieberman would famously go on to refer to Marilyn Manson as "perhaps the sickest group ever promoted by a mainstream record company." Nearly every performance of their Dead to the World tour was picketed by religious organizations.

The band, however, embraced the controversy and catapulted themselves into one of the top rock acts of the late 1990s. Antichrist Superstar has sold over 7 million copies worldwide, with 1.9 million of those sold in the United States alone. It spawned two commercial singles and music videos ("The Beautiful People" and "Tourniquet") and an additional three music videos; "Cryptorchid", "Man That You Fear" and the title track, "Antichrist Superstar". The latter was screened at the 1997 San Francisco Film Festival, depicting Manson on a podium, bearing a lightning bolt symbol and, in one scene, tearing apart the Bible and dumping it on the public. Interscope Records refused to release the "Antichrist Superstar" music video for airplay. However, in 2010, the unedited video was leaked on YouTube.

The band followed the album with the Remix & Repent EP on November 25, 1997, as well as the Dead to the World VHS video on February 10, 1998, which documented their controversial tour. Three previously unreleased songs from the band were also included on high-profile soundtracks to motion pictures. "Long Hard Road Out of Hell" appeared on the soundtrack to Todd McFarlane's Spawn, "Apple of Sodom" on the soundtrack to David Lynch's Lost Highway (also released on Nothing Records) and "The Suck for Your Solution" featured on the soundtrack to the Howard Stern biopic Private Parts. Antichrist Superstar remains a milestone in the band's career. In the years since its release, it has been heralded by numerous publications as a modern classic and essential listening.

== 1997-99 ==
The late 90s at Nothing Records featured many electronic acts arriving at the label, via licensing deals with UK labels Warp Records and Blue Planet. Nothing continued to sign rock based acts as well, such as 12 Rounds and Rob Halford's 2wo project. They would also release new albums from their highest selling acts, Nine Inch Nails and Marilyn Manson, as well as another high-profile film soundtrack, Lost Highway. This period of time would become the most prolific era for the label.

=== Lost Highway soundtrack ===
In late 1995, filmmaker David Lynch began production on Lost Highway. The film score was created by long-time Lynch composer Angelo Badalamenti, with additional music provided by Barry Adamson. Supplementing their compositions, Lynch also sought to use unnerving soundscapes throughout the film and, at the suggestion of a mutual friend, reached out to Trent Reznor to achieve this. Over the years, Reznor had publicly praised Lynch's work, particularly the film Blue Velvet and the TV series Twin Peaks, the latter of which Reznor claimed to have even delayed Nine Inch Nails performances, in order to watch the latest episodes.

Although Reznor would accept Lynch's offer, he initially found the experience to be a stressful one. "At first it was like the most high-pressure situation ever. He (Lynch) would describe a scene and say, 'Here's what I want. Now, there's a police car chasing Fred down the highway, and I want you to picture this: There's a box, okay? And in this box there's snakes coming out; snakes whizzing past your face. So, what I want is the sound of that – the snakes whizzing out of the box – but it's got to be like impending doom.' And he hadn't brought any footage with him. He says, 'Okay, okay, go ahead. Give me that sound.' He wasn't doing it to intimidate me. At the same time, I had to tell him, 'David, I'm not a film-effects guy, I don't have ad clients and I'm not used to being in this environment. I don't work that way, so respect that and understand that I just need a few moments to be alone, so that I know that when I suck, no one is knowing I'm sucking and then I'll give you the good stuff.'"

Reznor composed two instrumental pieces for the film under his own name, enlisting Coil's Peter Christopherson to assist on the songs. Reznor had lobbied for Coil to take on a greater role in composing music for Lynch's films, but Lynch declined. Coil member John Balance recalled, "You know, with Lost Highway, Trent literally forced (us) down David Lynch's throat, saying 'Look, please put this Coil stuff on.' You know, he really did help to get us on that soundtrack, but he (Lynch) wasn't interested. He wanted David Bowie, he wanted Marilyn Manson, he wanted whomever he could get. He just said, 'These people are really big. I want this film to be really big.' He didn't give a fuck about the integrity."

After completion of the score compositions, David Lynch would ask Reznor to handle the release of the soundtrack, which would also include major rock artists personally selected by Lynch, such as David Bowie, Marilyn Manson, The Smashing Pumpkins (who recorded an exclusive song for the soundtrack) and Rammstein, as well as a new song from Nine Inch Nails, entitled "The Perfect Drug." The soundtrack was subsequently slated for release on Nothing Records.

Marilyn Manson also recorded a new song for the soundtrack, "Apple Of Sodom," even filming a music video for it, which went unreleased at the time, though it later found its way onto YouTube. Band members Marilyn Manson and Twiggy Ramirez also filmed cameo appearances in the Lost Highway film itself. Rammstein, who were largely then-unknown and also major fans of Lynch, had sent him their music from Germany. Lynch, in turn, played Rammstein on set throughout the filming of Lost Highway and selected two of their songs for the soundtrack. A music video for their song "Rammstein" heavily featured clips from the film. Nine Inch Nails also completed a music video for "The Perfect Drug," directed by Mark Romanek. Unlike the Rammstein music video, "The Perfect Drug" did not feature any film footage from the film.

The Lost Highway soundtrack was originally planned for release in late 1996 to coincide with the release of the film. However, the film release was delayed slightly, instead premiering on February 27, 1997. The soundtrack was likewise pushed back, with its official release date set just ahead of the film on February 18, 1997 on Nothing Records. Behind the momentum of the numerous, major rock acts involved, the soundtrack went on to become a commercial success, reaching No. 7 on the Billboard 200 and receiving Gold certification in the United States.

Nine Inch Nails released a single for The Perfect Drug on May 13, 1997, featuring remixes from Nothing Records act Meat Beat Manifesto and another recent addition to the label's roster; Luke Vibert's Plug project. Fellow Nothing Records act Coil was also invited to do a remix. However, they declined, citing lack of time, due to the recording of their album Backwards.

In 2014, David Lynch once again collaborated with Nine Inch Nails, directing their music video for "Came Back Haunted," from the album Hesitation Marks. On November 7, 2016 the Lost Highway soundtrack was re-issued as a 180-gram double vinyl by Dutch label Music On Vinyl.

=== Plug ===
In 1995, the prolific, British electronic musician Luke Vibert debuted a project called Plug on seminal UK label Rising High Records, where he had previously released material under the name Wagon Christ. The Plug material showcased a different side of Vibert's repertoire, foraying into the genres of drum 'n' bass and jungle, which were reaching their peak in the British club scene. Plug began with a series of 12" EPs, each an anagram of Vibert's name; Visible Crater Funk, Rebuilt Kev and Versatile Crib Funk, the latter of which was moved under Rising High's sub-label, Blue Angel Records.

In 1996, Plug followed up the EPs with a debut full-length through Blue Angel, entitled Drum 'n' Bass for Papa. The following year, Blue Planet Recordings, a sub-label of Silver Planet Recordings, reissued the album, along with the single Me & Mr. Sutton.

In 1997, Trent Reznor invited Plug to remix the Nine Inch Nails track The Perfect Drug, which had been heavily inspired by UK electronic music. There exists confusion about how Trent had come to know Vibert's work, with Vibert himself stating, "I could never understand how I got it (The Perfect Drug remix) in the first place. Somehow, Trent heard my stuff and really liked it." He added, "Someone told me that Alex Paterson from The Orb played my Plug stuff for Trent and someone else told me that Coil played it for him. All I know is that Nothing got in contact with me for the Nine Inch Nails remix and then expressed interest in releasing Drum 'N' Bass For Papa, so I guess I passed the test." Nothing Records label-mate Jack Dangers of Meat Beat Manifesto (who likewise appeared with a remix on Nine Inch Nails' The Perfect Drug single) credited himself as having introduced Vibert's work to Reznor. Dangers had been a fan of Vibert's, inviting him to remix Meat Beat Manifesto around the same time, on MBM's It's The Music single (under the Plug moniker) and the Original Fire EP (as Luke Vibert). At the time, Vibert also had a standing offer from UK label Ninja Tune to re-issue the album. Vibert ultimately opted to accept Reznor's offer with Nothing Records.

On September 9, 1997, Nothing/Interscope released the double-disc collection, Drum 'N' Bass For Papa + Plug EP's 1, 2 & 3, licensed from Blue Planet Recordings. The album compiled the Plug full-length alongside tracks from the Visible Crater Funk, Rebuilt Kev and Versatile Crib Funk EPs. However, there were some differences between the US and UK editions. The tracks "Cut" and "Subtle (In Your Face)" were replaced on the US edition by new mixes; "Cut ('97 Remix)" and "A Subtle Blend," while the track "The Life Of The Mind" was omitted altogether, due to concerns over uncleared samples, which included dialogue from the Coen Brothers film Barton Fink. For the second disc of EPs, the songs "Cheesy (Pic 'N' Mix)" from Rebuilt Kev and "Crib Funk" from Versatile Crib Funk were omitted, while the track titles for "Tuff Rinse" and "Versatile" were reversed.

The following year in 1998, Vibert would again appear on major labels, returning to his Wagon Christ alias for the Tally Ho! album, which was released on Virgin Records in the UK and Astralwerks in the US. In the years to follow, Vibert continued to further establish himself as one of the most well-known producers in underground, British electronic music, with releases under a variety of aliases, including Kerrier District, The Ace Of Clubs, Amen Andrews, Spac Hand Luke, Luke Warm and more, for a host of influential electronic labels, including Warp Records, Rephlex Records, Ninja Tune, Planet Mu, Mo' Wax and many more.

Vibert would later state that he was unable to continue the Plug project, stemming from his inability to record songs in the same style, due to changes in his equipment and recording techniques. Instead, Vibert created the Amen Andrews alias for Rephlex Records, which explored similar territory as Plug, under the revised recording techniques.

However, a wealth of unreleased Plug material still existed, which would slowly find its way out in subsequent years. In 2006, Todd Osborn and Tadd Mullinix's Detroit-based label Rewind Records released Plug's Here It Comes EP, which collected several unreleased tracks from the 90s Plug archives. In early 2011, Luke Vibert would go back to Ninja Tune, the label which nearly released the Plug material in 1997, to inform them that he found some long-lost, never before heard DATs of Plug material, dated from 1995 - 1998. Receptive to the material, Ninja Tune released it as the second, full-length Plug album, Back On Time, on January 9, 2012. To date, it stands as the final release under the Plug moniker.

Due to his propensity to produce under a myriad of monikers and labels, combined with his limited recording window as Plug, Vibert's involvement with Nothing Records did not extend beyond Drum 'N' Bass For Papa, aside from two of the album's tracks featuring on the 1998 Nothing Records compilation, Nothing Changes. Vibert remains a well-known producer in electronic music, regularly releasing new material across a variety of electronic sub-genres.

=== 2wo ===
2wo (alternately written as Two) was the brainchild of heavy metal idol Rob Halford and guitarist John Lowery (better known as John 5). After spending nearly 20 years garnering mainstream success as frontman for heavy metal icons Judas Priest, having recorded 12 studio albums and selling nearly 50 million albums, Halford announced to the band on July 4, 1991 that he would be leaving. However, he wouldn't officially depart from the band until May 1992, due to contractual obligations. That same year, Halford would launch a new heavy metal band, Fight. Fight would release two albums and an EP, before disbanding in autumn of 1995, when they were dropped by their label, Epic Records, due to sales falling below expectations.

Throughout the early 1990s, John Lowery had been working as a guitarist around Los Angeles, where he met producer Bob Marlette. Marlette would produce an EP for Lowery's short-lived band, Red Square Black, entitled Square. The duo also helped write and record much of David Lee Roth's DLR Band album. The blueprint for 2wo began in October 1995, when Halford first met Lowery. Halford recalled, "I was at the Foundation Forum a few years back and a journalist friend of mine told me about John Lowery, the guitar player. John and I got in touch. We spent a few days together in Los Angeles and we started to just sit around with some guitars and write." Lowery then introduced Halford to producer Bob Marlette and the trio commenced work on some demo songs, which would become the foundation of 2wo. "I created 'Two' because I wanted to re-capture that tangible rush I experienced when I first launched my career," Halford explained. After a few months, the trio had pieced together a cassette demo, which Halford was playing for friends and colleagues.

While the project was still without a name, in February 1996, a chance encounter in New Orleans would lead the band onto Nothing Records. While visiting for Mardi Gras, Halford made an impromptu visit to Nothing Studios, where he met Trent Reznor. Halford recalled, "I was in New Orleans at Mardi Gras, where I go every year, and was partying with some friends and they pointed out where Trent's studio was. One of my friends said, 'Why don't you go knock on the door and say hi?' I never do that kind of thing. For whatever reason, I got out of the car and walked across the street and banged on the door. Rave Ogilvie opened the door and welcomed me in. We'd never met before, but he was just a really nice, cool guy and he showed me around the studio. A little while later Trent showed up and we'd never met before either. We just sat there and talked about this that and the other. He knew I had some demos with me and asked to listen to the music. He listened to it and asked me if I'd leave the cassette, which I did, and that was that really. We hung out together for a couple of more days, because he was in some of the parades and so forth. But then I just went back to Phoenix and didn't hear anything from him for the longest time."

Trent would listen to the songs from Halford's demo and go on to conceive a deeper vision for the work, as well as offer it a home at Nothing Records. Halford explained, "Suddenly he calls me up and first of all offers me a record deal, which was great because I was looking for one. And then secondly, he gave me then his vision, his ideas of where he could see this music going." After the band accepted Reznor's offer, additional work commenced on the album, which was already in near finished form by that time, with the band and Dave Olgivie recording in Vancouver, Canada, while Trent did additional work from Nothing Studios, with parts sent back and forth. Halford stated, "Trent came in pretty much when the whole first sessions of the songs had been completed. They were well past the demo stage. We had practically mixed it down to where we felt we had something we were almost ready to release. What Trent did was basically strip it all down and re-build it. Essentially the songs are all there intact, but in terms of every aspect of the sound, drums, bass, guitars, vocals. All of that was totally re-developed. All the accessories, all the electronic sounds, samples, all of those came from Reznor and Reznor's people." Reznor received an executive producer credit for his work on the album.

By September 1997, recording was completed on the album, now titled Voyeurs. With the added collaboration of Reznor and Olgivie, the songs took on more of an electronic industrial metal sound. The band initially announced their name as Gimp. After discovering another band was already using the name, they quickly changed their name to 2wo. Voyeurs was announced for release on March 10, 1998. One month prior to the release of the album, Halford would gain headlines after confirming his homosexuality to MTV. Voyeurs was led by the single "I Am A Pig," which filmed a music video, shot by gay porn director Chi Chi Larue. The music video featured various porn stars and depicted non-explicit scenes of S&M. While not banned, the music video received sparse airplay, due to its mature subject matter. 2wo also signed to East West Records for European distribution of Voyeurs. A Japanese edition of the album on DML would include one bonus track, entitled "In My Head." Rob Halford's website would later publish two additional unreleased tracks from the Voyeurs sessions as MP3s; "Shout" and "Scream."

Upon the release of Voyeurs, the band launched a tour in support of the album, though several dates were later cancelled. The live band consisted of Halford, Lowery, Sid Riggs, Ray Riendeau and former Nine Inch Nails keyboardist James Woolley. The album received a polarizing response, as many Halford fans did not enjoy 2wo's industrial sound, favoring his more traditional heavy metal sound. However, other fans embraced his diversity. Voyeurs went on to sell 47,000 copies, which was considered a commercial disappointment. When asked about his experiences with Nothing, Halford stated:

I wasn't completely aware of the Nothing roster and the philosophy of Nothing Records. But as I began the relationship and looked around, and found out what it was setting out to do, I was just thrilled to be a part of it. It's a label that works very much on artistic purity, it's not one that takes and steers the artists in various ways of making the hit record. They just look at you for what your worth is in terms of the music that you present to them. They seem to become involved based on what they hear coming out of the speakers, not what you look like, what you're image is. It's just what's coming out of the speakers. If they can relate to that, then you can be a part of the Nothing organization. It's a very respective and eclectic bunch of people that Trent has put together. He's the man responsible for the signing on his label.

A second single from Voyeurs, "Deep In The Ground," was considered for commercial release on East West Records in Europe, but plans were later scrapped. Upon completing their tour, Halford went back into the studio with Bob Marlette, recording demos for what was intended to be a follow-up album. One demo from these sessions, "Silent Screams," was published on the 2wo website. However, member John Lowery would soon depart from 2wo, in favor of taking lead guitar duties for Nothing Records label-mates Marilyn Manson. Ultimately Halford's plans for a sophomore album were scrapped, in favor of returning to his heavy metal roots, with a new project simply titled Halford. The debut Halford album, Resurrection, features the final, studio version of "Silent Screams," as well as two other tracks from the original 2wo sessions; "Slow Down" and "Drive," both of which were co-written with Bob Marlette. The break-up of 2wo likewise marked the end of the band's time of Nothing Records, with Voyeurs remaining their only commercial release on the label.

In 2003, Rob Halford reunited with Judas Priest, where he continues to front the band to wide acclaim. After Lowery's tenure with Marilyn Manson ended in 2004, he continued to perform under the name John 5. In addition to releasing solo material, he has served as guitarist for Rob Zombie since 2005. In the years since, both Halford and much of his fanbase have adopted a warmer disposition in regards to the 2wo material. Halford acknowledged a demand for a reissue of Voyeurs, stating "Everyone's asking me about 2wo. The reason that we really haven't gone there yet is because we're trying to figure out all of the business side of that scenario. When I separated from Sanctuary in London, they gave me the opportunity to buy back all of my Halford solo material. You know, obviously the recordings and the photos and the videos and everything else. So we did a really sweet deal there and then Sony BMG have been really cool about me gaining access to all of the Fight material, because that was originally on Epic. The 2wo project was with Trent Reznor's label, Nothing Records, through Interscope. And I wasn't really sure there would be that much demand for it, but the fact is that everybody keeps asking me about it and I'm really pleased about that. 'Cause, to some extent, I think that it was overlooked, because it wasn't metal as people know me for, but it was a fantastic collaboration with Trent and what I would like for people to hear are the original recordings that Trent first listened to. And then when he became involved with Dave "Rave" Ogilvie from Skinny Puppy in Vancouver, the three of us put our heads together and created that final CD. So I think that it would be great if everybody had an opportunity to listen to the original songs, because they are a lot tougher, you know, they're a lot edgier. They've got more of a rock/metal vibe going to them." Several of these original versions were in fact published on Rob Halford's website in the early 2000s, under the name The Pre-Reznor Mixes ("I Am A Pig," "Water's Leaking," "Leave Me Alone," "Deep In The Ground" and "Bed Of Rust"). They continue to circulate on the Internet amongst fans, but to date, neither the pre-Reznor mixes, nor the Voyeurs album, have been reissued.

=== 12 Rounds ===
12 Rounds is a British rock band formed by Atticus Ross, Claudia Sarne and Adam Holden, after being introduced by mutual friends at a carnival. The trio first began collaborating musically on the 1995 Bomb The Bass album, Clear. Through their time in the studio together, they decided to form their own band, originally named 12 Rounds With Jesus. After appearing with a demo of their song "Holed" for a cassette compilation for NME Magazine, entitled Past Forward, the band was offered a deal with Polydor Records. The band then shorted their name to 12 Rounds and brought on drummer Andy Crisp.

The band's first release came in 1995, in the form of their self-titled 12 Rounds E.P. (also known as the Something's Burning E.P.). The E.P. featured four tracks from their debut album, Jitter Juice, while the 12" version also featured an additional remix of "Something's Burning," entitled "Something Dub." The band followed with the album Jitter Juice in 1996. The Personally E.P. arrived later that year, which featured two album tracks and two exclusive songs; "Happy Hour" and "Feel My Beard." 12 Rounds would also release a double single from the album; Business / Pleasant Smell. Music videos were filmed for three tracks from the album; "Holed," "Business" and "Personally," the latter of which was helmed by acclaimed director Chris Cunningham. The track "Something's Burning" was also featured on the soundtrack to the film All Over Me.

12 Rounds toured the UK in support of Jitter Juice, opening for Sneaker Pimps. The band also played the UK festival circuit. Despite their touring and support from a major label, the band failed to attain much commercial success in their native country and received no international distribution, therefore remaining largely unknown outside of the UK. The band were ultimately dropped from Polydor and member Adam Holden parted ways with the band. Claudia Sarne recalled, "We were the antithesis of everything Britpop represents. So we didn't go down a treat here in England when our first record came out. Our first album was rather punk and raw and in the environment of Britpop and trip hop, it really didn't stand a chance."

During the summer of 1997, the band recorded an album's worth of material in their basement studio, with Atticus's brother Leopold Ross splitting guitar duties with keyboardist / guitarist Mark De Lane Lea, as well as Stanley Adler on cello. Trent Reznor would hear this material and offer them a deal with Nothing Records. However, 12 Rounds was courted by numerous other labels as well. Claudia stated, "We were shocked by the influx of offers, but Nothing was so right for us because it's so artist-led. It's really the difference between feeling like a handmade Bristol and being on a Ford conveyor belt." Their sophomore album, My Big Hero, featured eight new tracks, alongside two songs from Jitter Juice; "Something's Burning" and "Pleasant Smell" (though both would have minor differences from their original versions). Pleasant Smell was released as a single on Nothing ahead of the album on June 9, 1998, featuring remixes from Trent Reznor, Charlie Clouser and Keith Hillebrandt of Nine Inch Nails, as well as Nothing Records label-mate Clint Mansell. A music video was also released for "Pleasant Smell." The single was followed by the release of My Big Hero on July 14, 1998. The band then went on their first tours of the United States, with Kirk Hellie joining the band to take over guitar duties. They took opening slots for VAST and Nothing Records label-mates Marilyn Manson, as part of the first leg of their Mechanical Animals tour.

After touring My Big Hero, the band began work on a third album, produced by Ben Hiller. After completing initial recording in England, Claudia and Atticus moved to Los Angeles in 2000 and began to do further production work on the album with Trent Reznor and former Nine Inch Nails drummer Jerome Dillon. During this time, however, Nothing Records was beginning to face an uncertain future as a record label. Nothing's parent label, Interscope, was moved under new management as part of the Vivendi / Universal merger. 12 Rounds found themselves lost in the shuffle of these corporate mergers. The band completed the album, but to date it has never been released. Meanwhile, the band remained under contract with Nothing, unable to release the music elsewhere at that time.

However, in 2002, signs of an album release did briefly arise, when artwork for a promo EP surfaced, entitled Select New Recordings 2002. The promo featured four tracks; "Dead Man," "Conspiracy," "Ring Pull" and "Could U Be," while the artwork featured reused designs from My Big Hero. Claudia Sarne stated on the 12 Rounds website that the band sent fifteen tracks for mastering from the third album, twelve of which would compose the final tracklist. Though a title for the third album was never revealed, the final track list was later published on the 12 Rounds website; 1. High Times, 2. Conspiracy, 3. Could U Be, 4. Big Love, 5. Ring Pull, 6. Still Water, 7. Xocet, 8. Sioux '86, 9. Chicane, 10. Bits & Pieces, 11. Dead Man, 12. Shine On.

Two additional tracks mentioned by Claudia as part of these sessions, but not included on the album, were "Everything I Want (Drown)" and "Another Day With My Friend." The latter would be released in 2000 on the soundtrack to the Tom Tykwer film The Princess and the Warrior, under the name "Just Another Day." Despite being a 12 Rounds-penned track, the song was credited to composers Pale 3 (a band which included director Tom Tykwer), "featuring" 12 Rounds. The song "Dead Man" also briefly appeared in the 2007 film Rise: Blood Hunter. Another track from the band's time on Nothing, "Freddy's Dead," was recorded for a proposed Nothing Records compilation, but the project never materialized. The track has never been officially released, however a live version recorded in 1998 can be found on the internet.

With 12 Rounds stuck in limbo, due to the eventual collapse of Nothing Records, the band began working on outside projects. Atticus Ross began recording on the Tapeworm project, alongside Reznor, Danny Lohner, Charlie Clouser and Maynard James Keenan, alongside a host of guest collaborators. Photos surfaced on the short-lived Tapeworm website, showing Atticus in the studio with the band. However, the Tapeworm material would likewise never see the light of day.

In 2004, Atticus joined his brother Leopold Ross in forming the noise rock band Error, though it would be short-lived, with a one-off E.P. being released on Epitaph Records. Atticus also made contributions to another of Leopold's rock bands, Nojahoda, although that project would also be short-lived. Atticus began to deepen his musical collaboration with Trent Reznor, beginning with the Nine Inch Nails album With Teeth in 2005. Meanwhile, Claudia Sarne would collaborate with Nothing label-mate Clint Mansell, to provide vocals to the main theme to the film The Hole in 2001. She later joined former Nine Inch Nails member Jerome Dillon's band nearLY in 2006. After the completion nearLY's debut album Reminder, the band played a handful of select live performances. These performances were recorded as a live CD/DVD, entitled Reminder Live, which was self-released by the band. It included a performance of "Chicane," one of the songs from 12 Rounds' unreleased third album. After the release of Reminder Live, Claudia announced her departure from nearLY, with the band as a whole quietly dissolving shortly after.

In 2005, Claudia and Atticus were married. Atticus continued to emerge as an in-demand producer and programmer, working with the likes of Barry Adamson, Coheed And Cambria, Pink, Bad Religion, Korn, Saul Williams and more. Claudia and Atticus also continued to collaborate musically, shifting their focus to the film world. The couple began composing music for the cable television drama Touching Evil, which was produced by the Hughes Brothers. Allen Hughes subsequently invited Atticus to compose music for his segment of the film New York, I Love You in 2008, followed by his feature film The Book of Eli in 2010.

That same year, Trent Reznor and Atticus Ross composed their first collaborative film score together, for the David Fincher film The Social Network, for which the pair won the Academy Award for Best Original Score. The duo has gone on to recorded numerous additional film scores together to critical acclaim, including The Girl with the Dragon Tattoo, for which the pair won the Grammy Award for Best Score Soundtrack for Visual Media, Gone Girl, Before The Flood, Patriots Day, the Ken Burns documentary Vietnam and more. Atticus likewise garnered acclaim as a solo film composer, composing scores to Love & Mercy, Blackhat, Triple 9, the TV series Outcast and more, all of which featured contributions from Claudia Sarne as well. The 2013 Allen Hughes film Broken City was a particularly noteworthy 12 Rounds reunion of sorts, featuring contributions from the entire current line-up of Atticus Ross, Claudia Sarne, Leopold Ross and Kirk Hellie.

Outside of their film compositions, Atticus continued his close musical partnership with Trent Reznor, recording on the Nine Inch Nails albums Year Zero, Ghosts I–IV, The Slip and Hesitation Marks. In 2010, Ross was announced as a member of How to Destroy Angels, a project with Trent Reznor and his wife Mariqueen Mandig-Reznor. The band derived their name from a song by fellow Nothing Records act Coil. They released a self-titled EP in 2010, followed by An Omen EP in 2012 and finally a full-length album, Welcome Oblivion in 2013. The band also did a small tour in support of the album. In 2016, after over a decade of musical partnership with Trent Reznor, Atticus Ross was announced as an official member of Nine Inch Nails, with the arrival of the Not the Actual Events EP.

After finally reacquiring the rights to their unreleased third album, in 2009, 12 Rounds released two tracks from the album, "Xecot" and "Shine On," as digital downloads on their website, followed by a third track, "Sioux 86," in 2010. Trent Reznor was credited with additional recording for the track "Shine On." In 2014, the members of 12 Rounds reunited for a performance at the Grammy Museum in Los Angeles, California, as part of a Q&A event with Atticus Ross and Elvis Mitchell for the Los Angeles Film Festival. It marked the first ever live performance by the current line-up of the band, featuring Atticus Ross, Claudia Sarne, Leopold Ross and Kirk Hellie, as well as the first performance of any kind by the band in over a decade. While not officially billed as a 12 Rounds show, the band played a short set of assorted material from their film scores, before closing their set with a performance of the song "Chicane" from their unreleased third album.

12 Rounds was one of the few acts to remain with Nothing Records until the demise of the label, with their third album becoming one of the most oft-requested, unreleased works of the Nothing Records era. Atticus has stated the album will likely one day be released in digital format, but has described it a slow process, due to his full-time commitments to Nine Inch Nails and film composing. While 12 Rounds has never officially disbanded, the members continue to primarily focus their musical collaborations on film compositions, mostly refraining from crediting themselves under their band name.

=== Meat Beat Manifesto (Actual Sounds + Voices era) ===
After completing touring in support of Subliminal Sandwich, Meat Beat Manifesto would release a follow-up compilation, entitled Original Fire, on May 20, 1997. Original Fire compiled new songs, remixes and updated versions of classic tracks from the band and became a North American exclusive of Nothing Records. Play It Again Sam opted against releasing it in Europe, due in part to the fact that some of the tracks had been previously released by them on earlier, European singles from the band, such as 1996's "It's the Music" single, which featured a remix from Nothing Records act Plug. Amongst the remix artists on Original Fire, fellow Nothing Records labelmate Luke Vibert appeared once again, this time under his own name, as well as The Orb. The band would release a music video for the song "Helter Skelter '97" in support of Original Fire, which was directed by band member Ben Stokes. Stokes also directed the band's music videos for "Edge of No Control," "Asbestos Lead Asbestos" and "Fromage," as well as directing an early video for Nothing Records label-mates Nine Inch Nails, for their song "Down In It" (in addition to editing their "Head Like a Hole" music video). "Helter Skelter '97" would also be pressed as a promo single CD by Nothing Records for radio airplay. Nothing would also release most of the tracks from Original Fire on vinyl, under the name of the "Radio Babylon" promo-only, LP single. The 2xLP version featured an exclusive, bonus remix from Luke Vibert.

The band then set about recording their next studio album, Actual Sounds + Voices. The album was led by the single "Acid Again," which was released on July 7, 1998 and also received European release via Play It Again Sam. Actual Sounds + Voices followed on August 28, 1998 on Nothing Records, with a European release through Play It Again Sam. Nothing even released a double LP version of the album on vinyl. Actual Sounds + Voices featured a more prominent use of jazz, while still maintaining the group's signature sound. One remix from the "Acid Again" single, as well as the "Book of Shadows" track from Actual Sounds + Voices also appeared on the Nothing Records compilation Nothing Changes, which was included with a 1998 issue of XLR8R Magazine.

A second single from the album, "Prime Audio Soup," would go on to become a hit for the band, due in part to being featured in the successful action film The Matrix, as well as appearing on the film's soundtrack, which also included Nothing Records label-mates Marilyn Manson. "Prime Audio Soup" was also released as a CD single in Europe on Play It Again Sam. The single featured remixes by Boards of Canada, The Herbaliser and Biomuse. While Nothing Records did press promo copies of the single, it was never commercially released by the label in the US.

Meat Beat Manifesto is one of the few acts to have seemingly left the label on good terms. As late as 1997, Jack Dangers commented that "I really appreciate Trent's willingness to put his money where his mouth is. Not many people have had the guts to do this. Everyone should know that Nothing have been incredibly supportive and they never try to manipulate my music. What I give them, they release ... no pressure. I have artistic freedom and support from a label that truly has their shit together. However, the band's departure from the label would amount to nothing more than their contract expiring. All of the band's releases on Nothing Records were licensed via Play It Again Sam. In 1999, the band's contract with PIAS expired, which in turn ended their licensing arrangement with Nothing Records.

In the wake of their departure from Play It Again Sam, Jack Dangers would found his own label, Tino Corp., alongside frequent MBM members/collaborators Ben Stokes and Mike Powell. There, Meat Beat Manifesto would release the Eccentric Objects EP on vinyl in 2000, as well as Storm The Studio RMXS in 2003, featuring remixes by DJ Spooky, Antipop Consortium, Jonah Sharp, Merzbow and more.

However, in 2002, when it came time to release their next studio album, RUOK?, the band opted to release it through Run Recordings, a division of Lakeshore Records. The label would also reissue their Storm The Studio and Armed Audio Warfare albums in 2003. That same year, the band released ... In Dub, a dub remix album of tracks from RUOK?. The band also released their first DVD, ... In Dub 5.1 Surround in 2004.

For their next album, At the Center, the band would take a departure in sound, recording a full blown jazz album. A collaboration between Dangers and several jazz musicians, the album was released on Thirsty Ear in 2005, as part of their Blue Series. Thirsty Ear would also release the album's companion EP, Off-Centre. The band would release their second DVD, Travelogue Live '05, in 2006.

In 2007, the band would self-release Archive Things 1982-88 / Purged, a collection of early recordings. This was followed by their next studio album, Autoimmune, in 2008. The album would see a U.S. release via Metropolis Records, with a UK release via Planet Mu. Each version of the album had a slightly different tracklist from one another, as well as different artwork.

In 2010, the band released their next studio album, Answers Come in Dreams. The album's name is derived from a pair of remixes Jack Dangers did for Nothing Records label-mates Coil in 1991, for their E.P. The Snow. The album was once again released in the U.S. on Metropolis Records, while the UK release was handled by the Hydrogen Dukebox label.

Meat Beat Manifesto's time on Nothing Records was, by all accounts, a positive experience for the band, with their departure primarily due to logistical reasons. In the years since, Dangers has spent his time bouncing from label to label, as well as self-releasing quite a bit of the band's material. Since the release of Answers Come in Dreams, the band has kept something of a low profile. However, they have not been entirely dormant, self-releasing a couple of EPs and playing select live dates. Rumors persist of a new album being in the works, though to date, nothing has been announced.

=== Marilyn Manson (Mechanical Animals era) ===
After the success of Antichrist Superstar, Marilyn Manson entered the studio with much mainstream attention to record their third full-length album, Mechanical Animals. Unlike their first two albums, Mechanical Animals would not be shepherded by Trent Reznor, who had shifted his focus back to Nine Inch Nails. Instead, the band enlisted Michael Beinhorn as principal producer, co-producing the record with Marilyn Manson, with Sean Beavan providing additional production duties. During this time, the band would also relocate from Fort Lauderdate, Florida, to Los Angeles, California, where recording commenced on the album.

Inspired heavily by David Bowie's Diamond Dogs album, Mechanical Animals shifted away from the industrial rock style of the band's earlier work, instead emulating a 1970s glam rock sound, epitomized by artists of that decade such as Bowie, Queen and T. Rex. Conceptually, the album delved into Manson's own struggles with fame and alienation. Manson described the album as being about "someone who feels like they're in a place where they're not accepted or don't belong. It's more from that perspective. It's much more vulnerable music that I'm making on this new album. Both sonically and lyrically, it's about the depression of alienation, rather than the aggressiveness of it. It's about the emptiness." The album was a rock opera and concept album, continuing an overarching story concept, which began with Antichrist Superstar, while the events of Mechanical Animals precede it.

Mechanical Animals was released on September 14, 1998 on Nothing / Interscope Records. The cover art depicted an androgynous Manson, naked with breasts, six fingers and airbrushed genitalia, which stirred up more controversy for the band. One month before the album's release, the three largest retailers in the United States at the time—K-Mart, Wal-Mart and Target—refused to stock the album, citing the cover artwork and its Parental Advisory sticker. In spite of this, the album debuted at number one on the Billboard 200, with first-week sales of 223,000 units, making it the first Marilyn Manson album to top the charts. The album was led by the single "The Dope Show", which received heavy video and radio airplay and would go on to become the band's most commercially successful song. The music video was inspired by Alejandro Jodorowsky's film The Holy Mountain, as well as the David Bowie starring film The Man Who Fell to Earth.

The band launched a series of tours to promote the album, the first being the Mechanical Animals Tour. Prior to the tour, guitarist Zim Zum opted to part ways with the band, leaving under amicable terms in order to pursue outside projects. He was replaced by Nothing Records label-mate John Lowery, who was fresh off his run with Rob Halford's 2wo project. After joining Marilyn Manson, Lowery assumed the stage name of John 5. The U.S. leg of the tour featured Nothing Records label-mates 12 Rounds performing as openers. The band then announced a co-headlining tour with Hole, called the Beautiful Monsters Tour. The tour would be ill-fated, however, due to conflicts between Manson and Hole singer Courtney Love. This led to Hole departing the tour after just nine dates. Manson subsequently enlisted Jack Off Jill and Nashville Pussy to take over select opening slots. Monster Magnet, who were already opening for Manson, assumed Hole's place on the tour's playbill, with the tour being renamed the Rock Is Dead Tour. The final four dates of the tour were canceled out of respect for the victims of the Columbine High School massacre, which brought Manson arguably the greatest controversy of his career, as the media mistakenly accused him of influencing the shooters.

The second single from the album, "I Don't Like the Drugs (But the Drugs Like Me)", was another video and radio hit for the band. The third single, "Rock Is Dead", was featured in the accompanying soundtrack of the film The Matrix, with the song being played during the film's end credits. The final single from the album was "Coma White."

While Mechanical Animals did garner critical acclaim, it was initially met with disappointment by longtime fans, who disliked the more mainstream sound, as well as the band's departure in style from their darker, more aggressive material. In time though, some fans adopted a warmer disposition to the material. In the wake of the album, tensions also mounted between Marilyn Manson and Trent Reznor, with both sides increasingly criticizing one other in the press. Reznor described Manson as willing to cross anyone in order to succeed, while Manson accused Reznor of destroying masters and mixes to many of the band's early, Reznor-produced songs. The two sides appeared to reconcile for a short time after Mechanical Animals, when Manson appeared in Nine Inch Nails' Starfuckers, Inc. music video and made a surprise appearance at Nine Inch Nails' concert on May 9, 2000 at Madison Square Garden in New York City, performing with the band during "Starfuckers, Inc.," followed by a performance of "The Beautiful People." The reconciliation was short-lived, however, with both sides resuming their verbal barbs at one another through the press and their websites. In more recent years, however, tensions seem to have subsided between the two. In 2011, Reznor described Manson as "a talented person," adding "we've had our problems, but I wear suits ... I'm an adult now." The following year, Manson expressed similar feelings, adding, "I don't have any bad feelings towards him (Reznor). I really don't. He helped put me out into the world and I went my way and whatever happened happened. I don't think there is tension."

Mechanical Animals was certified platinum by the Recording Industry Association of America (RIAA) on February 25, 1999 and had sold over 1,409,000 copies in the United States. It remains one of the highest selling albums to date for both the band and Nothing Records. The album was followed by the home video God Is in the TV, which chronicled the band's tours in support of the album, as well as compiling all of their music videos to date. It was released on November 2, 1999 on VHS. A live album from the tour, The Last Tour on Earth, followed shortly thereafter on November 16, 1999. The live album ended with a studio outtake from Antichrist Superstar, entitled "Astonishing Panorama of the Endtimes." A claymation music video for the song was released as a single, depicting Manson as part of the Celebrity Deathmatch television show.

=== Einstürzende Neubauten ===
Einstürzende Neubauten (sometimes written as EN, translated into English as Collapsing New Buildings) is an avant-garde, experimental group formed in West Berlin, Germany in 1980, by members Blixa Bargeld, N.U. Unruh and Alexander Hacke. The band established a following due to their innovative instrumentation, particularly at their live shows, which, in addition to traditional instruments, featured custom instruments built from scrap metal, found objects and power tools. Vocalist Blixa Bargeld also brought added attention by concurrently serving as long-time guitarist and backing vocalist for Nick Cave and the Bad Seeds from 1983 to 2003.

Over the course of the 1980s, the band would rise through the ranks of many established labels, such as Some Bizzare Records and Rough Trade Records, where they released albums such as Kollaps, Zeichnungen des Patienten O. T. (English translation: Drawings of Patient O.T.), the best of / rarities compilation Strategies Against Architecture 80-83 and Halber Mensch (English translation: Half Man). Fellow, future Nothing Records label-mate Raymond Watts of Pig would also frequently serve as an engineer for the band throughout the 1980s, both in the studio and at live shows. The band capped off the 80s with the albums Fünf auf der nach oben offenen Richterskala (English translation: Five on the Open-Ended Richter Scale) and Haus der Lüge (English translation: House of the Lie), both of which proved to be commercial successes in the U.S. The band's rise through the 1980s paved the way for a deal with Mute Records in the 1990s, beginning with Tabula Rasa in 1992. The album marked a change in sound for the band, shifting into softer, less abrasive songwriting and featuring expanded use of electronics. The band would also release a sequel compilation, Strategies Against Architecture II, during this time.

The recording of their next album, Ende Neu (English translation: Ending New), would prove to be a difficult one, due to the departure of long-time members Mark Chung, who left at the outset of recording in 1994, as well as F.M. Einheit, who contributed much to the music and sound of the band and left a short time later in 1995, amidst recording of the album. Blixa Bargeld questioned if the band would continue, stating "There was suddenly only three of us left, which makes it a bit tough." The band continued on, however, bringing on Jochen Arbeit and Rudolph Moser as permanent members, alongside Ash Wednesday on keyboards for live concerts. Ende Neu was completed and released on Mute Records in 1996, with the song "Stella Marris," a duet between Bargeld and Hacke's then-wife, singer Meret Becker, garnering particular acclaim. The band supported the album with a world tour.

Trent Reznor had been a long-time fan of the band, openly citing his admiration for their music. Blixa Bargeld recalled meeting him at some Einstürzende Neubauten shows, stating, "Trent Reznor used to come backstage at (our) 80s concerts." In 1997, Reznor successfully arranged to bring the band aboard Nothing Records. The band, which held the copyright to their album, liked the appeal of additional major label support, as well as Reznor's enthusiasm for their body of work and agreed to a licensing deal with Nothing Records. Bargeld recalled, "Trent Reznor is so kind to contract the band, (which) he always admired."

The road for Einstürzende Neubauten's release on Nothing Records would prove to be a long one, however, with repeated delays pushing the Stateside release of Ende Neu back until late 1998. The album was finally released in the U.S. on October 20, 1998, featuring a bonus track, "Bili Ruben." A music video for "Stella Maris" accompanied the album, which received minor airplay on MTV. Nothing also financed a U.S. tour for the band that autumn, which became expensive, due in part to bringing along all of the band's custom instrumentation from Germany. The tour lost an estimated $40,000 for the label, according to Bargeld.

In Europe, the band released the companion album Ende Neu Remixes on Mute Records in 1997, which featured Ende Neu tracks remixed by artists such as Barry Adamson, Pan Sonic and Darkus (a.k.a. Mark Rutherford). Darkus' remix tracks, alongside others not included on Ende Neu Remixes, were made available separately in the same year on The NNNAAAMMM Remixes By Darkus. Neither of these releases were picked up for licensing by Nothing Records.

Einstürzende Neubauten then set about recording their next album, Silence Is Sexy. By this point, much like fellow Nothing Records act 12 Rounds, the band found themselves victim to the same corporate shake-up. Nothing Records' parent company, Interscope Records, was merged with Geffen Records and A&M Records, after Interscope's owners, Seagram, purchased the other labels. By early 1999, shortly after the release of Ende Neu, Interscope Records began operating under the umbrella of Interscope Geffen A&M Records. The new ownership began actively looking to cut costs and made it clear they did not have any further interest in releasing Einstürzende Neubauten's material, with Bargeld stating, "Seagrams acquired them (Nothing / Interscope). We gave them the (Silence Is Sexy) album and (Nothing Records) said that Seagrams decided not to release the record. I asked if that was a joke. We make a record deal, then they don't release it, so we left them." With Nothing licensing the music directly from the band, Einstürzende Neubauten were able to immediately depart from the situation. The band decided to instead allow Mute Records to handle both the European and American releases of Silence Is Sexy, with the album being released in 2000.

Strategies Against Architecture III followed soon after in 2001 and the band fulfilled their contract with Mute Records. Beginning in 2002, the band began recording a new album, without support from a major label, relying instead upon fan support in an experiment on their website, offering exclusive audio in exchange for paid membership. An exclusive Supporter Album No. 1 and the Airplane Miniatures E.P. were made available to supporters in 2003. The band would follow this template for years to come, releasing a myriad of exclusive titles to their fans. The band released the album Perpetuum Mobile in 2004, once again returning to Mute, in part to help facilitate a world tour. Alles wieder offen (English translation: All Open Again) followed in 2007, which was self-released on the band's own Potomak label. In 2014, the band returned to a major label for the release of Lament on BMG Records.

Einstürzende Neubauten's time on Nothing Records would be brief, with Ende Neu standing as their sole release on the label. In 2009, Ende Neu was reissued as a remastered CD, with an expanded booklet, on Neubauten's own Potomak label. The band continues strong to this day, having garnered much critical and commercial success. They are considered to be one of the pioneers of industrial music, despite their own apathy to such accreditation. The band continues their formula of releasing major albums on labels, supplemented by a wealth of self-released material direct to fans.

=== Autechre ===
Autechre arrived at Nothing via a licensing deal with their UK label, Warp Records, as part of a package which also included Warp acts Squarepusher and Plaid being picked up by the label. Autechre is the duo of Rob Brown and Sean Booth of Greater Manchester, England. Their sound was considered pioneering within the electronic music scene, with their early work rooted in techno, house, electro and hip-hop, while their later efforts ventured into more experimental soundscapes. At the time, Warp was emerging as one of the premier labels for electronic music, with many of their acts being licensed to esteemed labels in the US, such as Sire (Aphex Twin, Jimi Tenor), Matador (Red Snapper, Two Lone Swordsmen) and Wax Trax! (Nightmares On Wax, Autechre). These licensing deals, in addition to Warp's highly acclaimed Artificial Intelligence series, in which Autechre participated, would help cement both Warp Records and their rosters' global presence and influence. Nothing Records became the next in this revered line of labels to collaborate with Warp, after Nothing label-mate Jack Dangers of Meat Beat Manifesto claimed to have introduced many of the Warp acts' music to Trent Reznor.

Prior to their arrival at Nothing, much of Autechre's back-catalog had seen release through Wax Trax! / TVT, in a similar licensing deal with Warp, which saw the US release of their EP, Basscad.EP, as well as their albums Incunabula, Amber and Tri Repetae++, the latter of which was packaged as a double-disc set to include their Anvil Vapre and Garbage EPs. After the licensing deal with Wax Trax! lapsed, Autechre released their Chiastic Slide album, which did not receive US release at the time.

By 1998, Autechre had completed their fifth album, LP5. Upon being picked up by Nothing Records, Autechre's Sean Booth commented on the advantages of being on a major label, stating "It's really interesting working with him (Trent Reznor). It's a learning exercise as much as anything. I don't know what's going to happen with it (being on Nothing Records). It's a long time going and it's like after that, whatever, if someone comes along and offers you a ridiculous amount of money. It's much more than we needed, but it's like it's turned out really useful, because we've managed to get everything going."

LP5 was released on October 26, 1998 on Nothing Records in the US, with the label releasing Plaid's Not For Threes and Squarepusher's Big Loada the same day. Two tracks from the album, "Vose In" and "Corc," also appeared on the Nothing Records compilation Nothing Changes, which was included with a 1998 issue of XLR8R Magazine. Autechre would continue to be licensed by Nothing Records until 2000, with Nothing working in tandem with Warp to release nearly all of the duo's new material in the US during this period. In 1999, Nothing released Autechre's Peel Session (a live recording from John Peel's legendary radio show - a second session of which was released by Warp in 2000) and EP7. The Warp CD edition of EP7 included a hidden track 00, which could be heard by starting track one of the CD, then rewinding backwards. Manufacturing issues prevented the hidden track 00 from inclusion on the Nothing Records edition. Also in 1999, Autechre released the SplitRmx12 promo-only 12", which featured an Autechre cover of Neu!. While SplitRmx12 never received any official release through Nothing Records, Warp pressed 3,000 copies, with 500 assigned to the UK. A portion were assigned to the US, for which Nothing Records assisted in North American distribution to US record stores, on behalf of Warp.

Autechre's time at Nothing Records would conclude when Warp Records established their own US distribution, though a deal with Caroline Distribution (which has since ended), effectively ending all of Warp's licensing to Nothing. Autechre's licensing through Wax Trax! and Nothing Records helped establish a US following for the act and by the time they began receiving direct US release via Warp, the duo had risen in stature to being one of the premier acts in electronic music. All three of their Nothing Records releases were eventually reissued in the US under the Warp umbrella, after the Nothing deal ended. Autechre remain going strong to this day, where they continue to call Warp Records their home, having released numerous albums to critical acclaim in the years to follow, such as Confield, Draft 7.30, Untilted, Quaristice, Oversteps, Exai and elseq 1–5.

=== Squarepusher ===
Squarepusher, much like label-mates Autechre and Plaid, came aboard Nothing via a licensing deal with Warp. Squarepusher is Tom Jenkinson of Chelmsford, Essex, England. After learning bass guitar and playing in local bands in his youth, Tom began taking an interest in techno and house music in the early 1990s. Amongst his influences were Aphex Twin and future Nothing Records label-mate Luke Vibert, particularly with his work as Plug. Jenkinson said of Plug's track "Military Jazz," "This track came on and, amongst the road noise and chatter, I heard what I thought was some sort of hip-hop track being played by a band. As the track progressed, I became more intrigued, as it sounded like they were trying to play as if it had been programmed. Then the Amen [break] came in, and I was floored; it sounded like a drummer playing breakbeats, and made me totally rethink my ideas of programming breaks."

Jenkinson's first recordings came out under his own name, with the Stereotype E.P. on the Nothings Clear label in 1994, which was financed by Jenkinson himself, alongside his friend Hardy Finn, the latter of whom would go on to found the Spymania label. The EP did not receive the level of attention Jenkinson had hoped for, but it did catch the ear of Grant Wilson-Claridge of Rephlex Records, who contacted Tom to express his compliments.

Jenkinson went on to record a few more releases under his own name, including the Crot E.P. and Bubble And Squeak E.P., as well as a split with Dunderhead, called Dragon Disc 2. In 1995, Tom began releasing music under the name Squarepusher, first appearing with the Conumber E:P, then following with Alroy Road Tracks under the name Duke Of Harringay, both on Finn's Spymania label. By 1996, Squarepusher had line up material for release at Rephlex Records, which was operated by Grant Wilson-Claridge and Richard D. James, a.k.a. Aphex Twin. Squarepusher released the Squarepusher Plays... 12" for Rephlex, followed by his debut album, Feed Me Weird Things (Jenkinson later released an album and E.P. under the name Chaos A.D. for Rephlex in 1998).

Shortly after the release of Feed Me Weird Things, Squarepusher released his first music for Warp Records in the form of the Port Rhombus EP in 1996. Jenkinson signed a multi-album deal with Warp and the label would become his long-time and primary home. The Vic Acid EP was released in 1997, followed by his sophomore full-length, Hard Normal Daddy. Later that year, Warp and Sypmania would co-release Burningn'n Tree, which compiled the Conumber E:P and Alroy Road Tracks, alongsing three previously unreleased tracks.

Also in 1997, the Big Loada EP was released on Warp. By 1998, the Nothing deal had come into place and Squarepusher would receive his first licensing into the United States, after Nothing label-mate Jack Dangers of Meat Beat Manifesto claimed to have introduced his music to Trent Reznor. Nothing decided to revisit the Big Loada EP and expand it into album length, adding on all tracks from the Port Rhombus EP and two tracks ("Lone Ravers (Live In Chelmsford Mix)" and "The Barn (303 Kebab Mix)") from Vic Acid. The song "Come On My Selector" was also moved up to open the album, with a music video for the track directed by Chris Cunningham, which was included as a file on the Nothing edition, as an enhanced CD. Two tracks from Big Loada, "Tequila Fish" and "Massif (Stay Strong)," also featured on the Nothing Records compilation Nothing Changes, which was included with a 1998 issue of XLR8R Magazine.

Nothing did not pick up Hard Normal Daddy for release, but did pick up most of Squarepusher's output through the remainder of the 1990s. Music Is Rotted One Note was released on October 13, 1998, the same day as Nothing version of Big Loada. The mini album Budakhan Mindphone followed on March 1, 1999. The Maximum Priest E.P. was released July 19, 1999, which featured remixes from Nothing Records label-mates Autechre and Luke Vibert (under the name Wagon Christ). The final Squarepusher album to see release on Nothing Records was Selection Sixteen on November 8, 1999. Aside from Big Loada, all of the Squarepusher releases on Nothing Records were essentially identical to the Warp editions.

Squarepusher's tenure at Nothing Records concluded when Warp Records established their own US distribution, though a deal with Caroline Distribution (which later expired), effectively ending all of Warp's licensing to Nothing. Squarepusher's licensing through Nothing Records served Jenkinson well in helping to establish his US following. By the time he began receiving direct US release via Warp, Squarepusher had become known as one of the most innovative acts in electronic music. All five of his Nothing Records releases were eventually reissued in the US under the Warp umbrella after the Nothing deal ended, though the album-length version of Big Loada remains unique to Nothing Records, with Warp opting to keep the releases in their original, EP formats. Squarepusher continues to push new boundaries to this day, where he still calls Warp Records his home, having released numerous albums to critical acclaim in the years to follow, such as Go Plastic, Do You Know Squarepusher, Ultravisitor, Hello Everything, Just A Souvenir, Solo Electric Bass 1, Ufabulum and Damogen Furies. Also in recent years, Jenkinson has launched a live band, Shobaleader One, which releases both original material and reinterpered versions of Squarepusher classics. They have released two albums to date; d'Demonstrator and Elektrac.

=== Plaid ===
Plaid, alongside label-mates Autechre and Squarepusher, was part of a trio of Warp acts picked up for licensing in the United States after their label struck a deal with Nothing Records. Plaid is the British duo of Ed Handley and Andy Turner. Both began as founding members of the electronic group The Black Dog, alongside Ken Downie. Handley and Turner would appear on numerous albums with The Black Dog during the early 1990s, which received critical acclaim, including Bytes, Temple of Transparent Balls, Parallel and Spanners. In 1991, Handley and Turner released Mbuki Mvuki, their debut under the name of Plaid. The album was self-released on their Black Dog Productions imprint. They followed up in 1994 with a collaboration with Mind Over Rhythm, entitled Mind Over Rhythm Meets The Men From Plaid On The Planet Luv on Rumble Records.

After five years recording with The Black Dog, Handley and Turner opted to pursue recording as Plaid full-time in 1995, while Downie continued The Black Dog as a separate venture. Plaid released the Android EP that same year for the Clear label, before signing with Warp Records, which had previously worked with them, during their time with The Black Dog. Plaid released their debut album for Warp in 1997, entitled Not for Threes. The album was preceded by the single Undoneson. Not For Threes featured a notable guest appearance on the track "Lilith" from Björk, with whom the duo had collaborated many times over the years, providing remixing and songwriting duties for her on multiple occasions.

In 1998, Plaid was picked up for licensing on Nothing Records in the United States, after Nothing label-mate Jack Dangers of Meat Beat Manifesto claimed to have introduced the Warp acts to Trent Reznor. Nothing released the US edition of Not For Threes on October 13, 1998. The Nothing version removed the track "OI" off the album, while adding on "Undoneson" and "Spudink" from the Undoneson single. "Undoneson" and an exclusive remix, "Abla Eedio (Freemix)," also appeared on the Nothing Records compilation Nothing Changes, which was included with a 1998 issue of XLR8R Magazine.

In 1999, Plaid released Peel Session, a live recording from John Peel's legendary radio show. Nothing released the Peel Session in the US on April 20, 1999, which featured no audio alterations from the Warp edition. Plaid followed up with a sophomore album, Rest Proof Clockwork, the same year. The album featured a hidden track called "Face Me," featuring Alison Goldfrapp. The Nothing Records edition was released on June 21, 1999, featuring an identical track list to the Warp edition, including the hidden track. Plaid also announced the Booc EP in the late 1990s, but it suffered repeated delays, before finally surfacing on Warp in 2000. It was not picked up for US release by Nothing Records.

Rest-Proof Clockwork would be Plaid's final release on Nothing Records, as Warp Records established their own US distribution in the early 2000s, via a deal with Caroline Distribution (which later expired), effectively ending all of Warp's licensing to Nothing. Warp would later reissue all three of Plaid's Nothing-released titles in the US. Plaid would go on to become known as one of Warp's most critically acclaimed and tenured acts, earning a dedicated, worldwide fanbase within the electronic scene. Plaid went on to release several more albums, including Trainer (a compilation of early Plaid work, including the complete Mbuki Mvuki album), Double Figure, Spokes, Plaid Remixes (Parts in the Post) (a compilation of Plaid remixes), Greedy Baby (an audio-visual collaboration with Bob Jaroc), Scintilli, Reachy Prints and The Digging Remedy. Plaid also recorded soundtracks for the films Tekkonkinkreet (which included a Plaid remix album, Tekkonkinkreet Remix Tekkinkonkreet), Heaven's Door and the interactive short film The Carp And The Seagull.

=== The Bowling Green ===
Micko Westmoreland was born in 1971 in Leeds, England and had an ear for music from a very young age, learning guitar, keyboards and bass. Throughout his youth, Westmoreland would dabble in traditional instrumentation, until 1990, when his decks and records were stolen. Using insurance money received as a result of the theft, Micko decided to purchase an Atari and synth and began his first experimentations in electronic music. While still developing his sound, during his time in college, Westmoreland collaborated with musician Brian Eno and a host of other young artists on the "Self Storage" exhibition at Wembley.

By the mid-1990s, Micko had honed his skills as an electronic producer and began recording as The Bowling Green; the name being derived from the venue on which the sport of bowls is played. The sound of The Bowling Green crossed many styles of electronica, incorporating a distinct sense of retro and nostalgia. Micko's earliest music to reach public ears would be for his brother, Wash Westmoreland, who began as a gay porn director, though he would later transition into an acclaimed independent filmmaker. Micko provided the music to many of his brother's gay porn films, often credited under the name The Bowling Green, including Naked Highway, Technical Exctasy, Animus and The Seven Deadly Sins: Gluttony.

The first track from The Bowling Green to see commercial release was on Rising High Records' Further Self Evident Truths compilation, with the track "Imparticular" included on Volume 3 of the series (alongside future Nothing Records label-mate Plug). Around this time, Micko approached numerous labels and several responded with offers. Ultimately, he decided on Blue Planet Recordings, a sub-label of Silver Planet Recordings, on the basis that Blue Planet promised Micko some studio time. Micko recalled, "So they lent me their studio and I used to go in there on Sundays and work for 23 hours and finish the mixes at about 8 in the morning, which is quite hellish really. The results of his studio time would be The Bowling Green's debut Mingle EP 12" in 1996. This was followed by the Chaise Longue EP in 1997, which featured a remix from Blue Planet and future Nothing Records label-mate Plug.

The music would catch the attention of Trent Reznor and Nothing Records, which had just licensed Luke Vibert's Plug project from the Blue Planet label. Nothing Records offered to license The Bowling Green from Blue Planet and Micko joined the label in November 1997. The Bowling Green would release The Receptionist E.P. on Blue Planet in 1998, as well as appear on compilations for electronic labels Law & Auder, Dot and Shadow Records. Micko also began working on a debut album, opting to record in a home studio, appropriately named The Spare Room, in Ladbroke Grove, West London. The resulting album, One Pound Note, was released in the UK on Blue Planet Recordings in June 1998. Shortly after the release, Micko appeared alongside Si Begg on the John Peel Sessions.

In October 1998, Micko gained further attention for an acting role in filmmaker Todd Haynes' glam rock drama Velvet Goldmine, starring alongside Ewan McGregor, Christian Bale, Jonathan Rhys Meyers, Toni Collette and Eddie Izzard. Micko played the mysterious Jack Fairy, who was loosely inspired by musicians Brian Eno and Marc Bolan. The role came about by chance for Micko, as Todd Haynes had been taking residence in the home of Micko's brother, Wash Westmoreland, while shooting his film Safe. Todd had met Micko though his brother and felt there would be a place for him somewhere in his new film, Velvet Goldmine. Initially auditioning for a minor part, Micko was instead cast in the pivotal role of Jack Fairy.

The first appearance of The Bowling Green on Nothing Records came with two tracks from One Pound Note being featured on the label sampler Nothing Changes, which was included with an issue of XLR8R Magazine in 1998. Nothing Records then released One Pound Note in the United States on January 19, 1999. The album contained numerous samples, including dialogue from the 1973 cult horror film, The Wicker Man. The album's samples were left intact for the U.S. release, with the exception of the song "Gentleman Reverse," which was cut from the U.S. edition, due to sample clearance issues.

The Bowling Green's run on Nothing Records was limited to the release of One Pound Note, as the Blue Planet label went on hiatus shortly thereafter (before eventually going defunct altogether after a brief return from 2004 to 2005). This left The Bowling Green in need of a new UK label and subsequently ended their licensing deal to Nothing Records. In 2002, The Bowling Green signed with Spiky Records in the UK, which released his sophomore album, Fabrications. The album marked a shift in sound for Micko, with many tracks more focused on songwriting. In addition, Spiky released three 12-inch singles around the Fabrications album; Pre-Fabrications Vol. One, Pre-Fabrications Vol. Two and Tigons And Liger, featuring remixes from μ-ziq and Si Begg's Buckfunk 3000 project.

After the release of Fabrications, Micko opted to no longer record as The Bowling Green. In 2001, he recorded music for his brother Wash Westmoreland's film The Fluffer, as well as his 2006 film Quinceañera. The latter won both the Audience Award and the Grand Jury Prize at the 2006 Sundance Film Festival. In 2009, Micko Westmoreland released his first solo album under his own name, entitled Wax & Wayne, on Terry Edwards' Sartorial Records. The album marked a significant change in sound for Westmoreland, leaving electronic music behind, in favor of a British indie rock sound. In 2010, however, Micko released an electronic project known as Wooden Spaceship in the U.S. on I, Absentee. The Wooden Spaceship material, which amounted to a one-off, self-titled EP, hearkened back to the electronic nostalgia and wonky beats of his electronic roots and represented a bridge between The Bowling Green and his later, eponymous solo material.

In 2015, Micko launched his own label, Landline Records, which released his sophomore album under his own name, entitled Yours Etc Abc. Micko also digitally reissued The Bowling Green albums One Pound Note and Fabrications on Landline Records in 2016. The same year, Micko digitally released a collection of both The Bowling Green and Micko Westmoreland remixes, simply titled Remixes and featuring tracks from the old The Bowling Green 12"s, which included remixes by Luke Vibert, Mike Paradinas and Si Begg, amongst others. In 2017, Landline Records digitally reissued the Wooden Spaceship EP. Micko continues to use Landline Records as his primary musical outlet.

=== Nine Inch Nails (The Fragile era) ===
Five years after the highly successful release of The Downward Spiral, Nine Inch Nails delivered their third album, The Fragile, in 1999. In the time between albums, Reznor had busied himself with numerous other projects for Nothing, such as Marilyn Manson's Antichrist Superstar album, the Lost Highway soundtrack and Rob Halford's 2wo project. Prior to recording the album, longtime drummer Chris Vrenna would part ways from the band, going on to launch his own project, Tweaker. Bill Rieflin and Jerome Dillon would take over drumming duties for the album, with the latter becoming the full-time, replacement drummer for the band, until 2005. The Fragile was produced by Trent Reznor and Alan Moulder at Nothing Studios in New Orleans.

The project developed into a major undertaking, becoming a double album. Canadian rock producer Bob Ezrin was consulted on the album's final track listing, in an effort to assemble the songs into a cohesive presentation. Unlike the gritty angst of The Downward Spiral, The Fragile relied more of melody, ambient noise and atmospheric soundscapes. Thematically, it is a concept album dealing with Reznor's personal issues at that time, which included depression, anger and drug abuse.

This first single from the album, "The Day the World Went Away", was released in North America on July 20, 1999. A music video was shot for the song, but went unreleased at the time (although parts eventually surfaced on 2002's And All That Could Have Been DVD). A television commercial for the album then aired on the 1999 MTV Video Music Awards, with Nine Inch Nails also performing the album's title song, "The Fragile," live on the show. The Fragile was released on CD, vinyl and cassette on September 21, 1999 and debuted at number 1 on the Billboard 200 with sales of 228,000 units, making it the first Nine Inch Nails album to top the charts. Each edition of the album featured minor variations in the track listing. The vinyl edition, pressed on 3 LPs, featured two tracks not available on the CD version; "10 Miles High" and "The New Flesh." The intros and outros of each sides are also different from the CD, particularly the song "Ripe," which does not have the "(with Decay)" section. The cassette edition features an extended version of the song "Please," entitled "Please (+ Appendage)."

"We're in This Together" was released as a three part CD single in Europe on December 14, 1999. The discs featured the bonus tracks from the vinyl, a Porter Ricks remix and an extended mix of "The Perfect Drug." A music video was also shot and released for the song. The third single from the album, "Into the Void," was released on CD in Australia on May 9, 2000, featuring no exclusive content. Another music video was shot and released for the song.

The band embarked on a worldwide tour in support of the album, with the first leg, entitled "Fragility 1.0," taking place in Europe, with Atari Teenage Riot performing as openers. Interscope Records reportedly refused to fund the promotional tour, following The Fragile's lukewarm sales, which had dropped sharply after its first week of release. Reznor instead committed to fund the entire tour himself, which quickly sold out. He concluded that "the reality is, I'm broke at the end of the tour", but also added, "I will never present a show that isn't fantastic." A television special, entitled "Fragility 1.0," aired as a 30-minute special on MTV on December 21, 1999, showcasing the first leg of the tour.

The North American leg of the tour, entitled "Fragility 2.0" followed, with A Perfect Circle serving as guest openers. Rolling Stone magazine named Fragility the best tour of 2000. A music video was shot for "Starfuckers, Inc.," with the song renamed "Starsuckers, Inc." to accommodate mainstream airplay. The music video features Reznor mocking rock stars such as Courtney Love, Billy Corgan, Marilyn Manson and even Reznor himself. Reznor and Manson had been exchanging verbal barbs in the press during this time, so the video marked a brief reconciliation with the pair, with Manson appearing in and co-directing the video. Manson also made a surprise appearance at Nine Inch Nails' concert on May 9, 2000 at Madison Square Garden in New York City, performing with the band during "Starfuckers, Inc.," followed by a performance of Manson's "The Beautiful People."

A remix album for The Fragile, entitled Things Falling Apart, was released on November 21, 2000. The album featured remixes from members of the band, as well as Adrian Sherwood, Dave Ogilvie and Telefon Tel Aviv. The release also includes a cover of the Gary Numan song "Metal." Nine Inch Nails also released a new song, entitled "Deep," on the soundtrack to the film Lara Croft: Tomb Raider in 2001. The band shot a music video to accompany the song, which did not feature any footage from the film.

Nine Inch Nails released their first live album, And All That Could Have Been, on CD, DVD and VHS on January 22, 2002. The CD included a bonus disc of softer renditions of older songs, as well as new material, entitled Still. Some tracks from Still evolved from rejected themes originally written for Mark Romanek's 2002 film One Hour Photo. The DVD featured live footage shot on the "Fragility 2.0" leg of the tour. The DVD also featured a performance of "The Day The World Went Away" as a hidden, bonus feature, which was intercut with clips of the song's unreleased music video. Marilyn Manson's guest performance with Nine Inch Nails at Madison Square Garden was also included as a hidden feature.

The Fragile was certified double platinum by the Recording Industry Association of America (RIAA) on January 4, 2000, denoting shipments of two million copies in the United States. The album received a mostly favorable critical reception and has gone on to be considered a favorite amongst fans of the band. In 2017, Nine Inch Nails released a vinyl reissue of the album, as well as The Fragile: Deviations 1; a 4-LP set assembled by Reznor and Atticus Ross, featuring instrumentals and alternate takes, alongside numerous rare and unreleased tracks from the era.

At the conclusion of The Fragile era, Trent admitted himself into rehab and began to sober up, putting Nine Inch Nails on hiatus. It was during this time of recovery that Reznor would begin looking into the finances of Nine Inch Nails, which would lead to a lawsuit against his then-manager and Nothing Records president, John Malm Jr. Their falling out would become one of the major catalysts in the eventual demise of the label.

== 2000–03: Later years ==
Following a peak period of activity over the course of the late 1990s, the output of Nothing Records began to slow after 2000. Many of the smaller artists were experiencing trouble with the label, due to increasing corporate interference, as a result of numerous corporate mergers. Since its inception, Nothing Records operated as a division of Interscope Records. While Nothing artists had experienced some issues with Interscope, it wasn't until Seagram's came into the fold that the corporate interference began to cripple the label from operating under its original vision. Interscope was owned by Universal, which in turn was owned by Seagram's. Seagrams acquired Polygram and merged it with Universal, after which Vivendi acquired Seagrams. The new corporate leadership came in looking to cut costs, giving the edict to cut many smaller artists, which affected many labels, including Nothing Records. Bands like Einstürzende Neubauten, Prick and 12 Rounds found their material being declined for release. Many acts would part ways from the label during this time. Warp Records would also establish their own US distribution through Caroline Distribution, resulting in all of their Nothing Records licensed acts departing from the label. Meanwhile during this period, Trent Reznor admitted himself into rehab and focused much of his energy into getting himself healthy. Only one new act arrived on the label during this tumultuous period; The The. Their experiences would lead to a very public departure from the label, serving as example of the greater problems plaguing not only Nothing Records, but the greater music industry as a whole. Their album, NakedSelf, served as something of a death knell for the label, after which only Nine Inch Nails and Marilyn Manson would continue bearing the label's name on their releases.

=== The The ===
Prior to arriving at Nothing Records, The The was an established, commercial success, with many critically acclaimed, hit albums, such as Infected, Mind Bomb and Dusk over the course of the 1980s and early 1990s. The The is an English rock band, fronted by singer/songwriter Matt Johnson, who has served as the only constant member of the band since its formation. After having spent the majority of their career on Epic Records, the band found themselves at creative odds with their label over the recording of The The's 1997 album Gun Sluts. The songs were more experimental in nature and Epic requested that Johnson revise the album to add more radio-friendly content, to which Johnson refused. Johnson also delivered a second studio album, entitled NakedSelf, to the label. "They didn't like that either. They asked me if I could make it more commercial and I was outraged. I said 'forget it,'" Johnson recalled. With both sides at an impasse, Johnson decided it was time to part ways with Epic. After a year of legal wrangling, the band was finally freed from their deal with Epic / Sony. In spite of their creative differences, Johnson stated, "The split from them was amicable, it wasn't acrimonious. I had a very positive relationship with Epic at that time, but they became really, really pop oriented and I was thoroughly marginalized."

For the first time in eighteen years, The The were free agents, in search of a new label. Nothing Records president John A. Malm Jr. was a huge fan of The The and became eager to sign them to Nothing Records. Trent Reznor too had been a big fan of the band, stating "Matt Johnson's music was one of the main reasons I began working on Nine Inch Nails. The passion, the honesty and the nakedness of his work opened doors of possibilities in my head." A contract offer from Nothing was accepted by the band in 1999, with Johnson initially very optimistic about the ideology of label and their partnership, commenting at the time, "The music industry is increasing corporatization, homogenization and general awfulness. It was a simple decision for me to choose Nothing Records, I feel we share many of the same beliefs and passions and already it feels like a natural home to me. I'm feeling galvanized and extremely excited about the next few years."

Although the band already had Gun Sluts completed, they opted to leave it unreleased, which is how it remains to this day. Instead Johnson decided to focus on NakedSelf for Nothing Records. NakedSelf did, however, feature one track, "DesielBreeze," from the unreleased Gun Sluts album. Overall, the album was a mature, contemplative piece, released on February 29, 2000 on Nothing Records to wide critical acclaim. A deluxe CD version was also released, featuring an expanded booklet of photography. Instead of a traditional music video to promote the album, the band filmed a trailer for the album. The NakedSelf trailer featured several excerpts from album set to video footage, as well as interview clips with Matt Johnson. The trailer appeared on The The's website and was released as a promotional piece to press and music video outlets. However, it quietly vanished from circulation in subsequent years and has become sought after by collectors.

NakedSelf was led by the single "ShrunkenMan". However, instead of featuring remixes, Johnson recruited other musicians to record cover versions of the song, including Foetus, John Parish and DAAU. The resulting single was titled Interpretations: Issue 1 - ShrunkenMan. The single was released on April 10, 2000, exclusively in the UK, with no American release. The title referenced future planned volumes for other singles from the album, which would follow the same cover song format, but their struggles with the label would ultimately result in the series ending at just a single volume. The band also embarked on their "World Tour of Tiny Spaces" in support of the album; a fourteen-month trek that would span the globe. While on tour, the band pressed self-released a single for Gun Sluts, which was a one-track single featuring the eponymous song from the unreleased album. The CD single was initially available exclusively on tour, then later through the band's website.

It was during the promotional stage of the album that Matt Johnson began to feel a heightened frustration with the lack of support from Nothing Records. Johnson recalled, "In Detroit, I got a call from an NPR station. They said they'd been begging the label for copies of the album and they wouldn't give them one. NPR had to beg and phone and beg and eventually got one. Then the NPR affiliate had to send someone to drive forty minutes to pick me up and take me to the station to do the interview, because the record label wouldn't do it. I've never known anything like it." With a great deal of personal, professional and emotional investment in NakedSelf, Johnson began to feel deep unhappiness toward his partnership with Nothing Records and the emerging, corporate conglomerate controlling them, which consisted of Interscope Records, Universal Music Distribution, Seagram's and Vivendi Entertainment. While many of the other acts on the label opted to quietly depart, or fight their battles in private, Johnson elected to make his battle very public, publishing an essay on his website called "The The Vs. The Corporate Monster." The essay detailed Johnson's extreme dissatisfaction over his experiences with the label, although his targets were primarily Seagrams and the larger music corporations as a whole. Johnson wrote in the essay:

In order to get the green light for the Universal/PolyGram merger, Seagrams promised their shareholders a return on cuts, not profits. They have a huge artist stable raped from three established major labels and two thirds has got to go, bringing it down to a trim, wealthy machine made up of just the plump ripe sellers. Millions of sales are now required to cover the increasing overheads at these labels. Overheads increased through ludicrous executive bonus payouts, inflated expense accounts and the quest for the Porsche. The artist is put to work harder and faster, in order to feed the machine. VivendiUniversalSonyAOLTimeEmiWarnerBMG, all represent a basket of share dividends to holders who are quick to move on when the coming gets tough. After a 7 year lay off, I recently released NakedSelf, an album that is generally considered one of the best of my career to some of the best reviews I've ever had. I've also been on tour since November 1999 selling out shows by word of mouth across Europe and America to fantastic audience response. Yet the reaction from Interscope/Universal has been destructive and negative in the extreme. Their utter dependence on the radio means that the good ship The The is abandoned as soon as the fear of no-play takes hold. They can think of no alternative and why should they when they can swiftly move on to the next act on the plank (step forward Beck, whoops! step forward Nine Inch Nails..oh dear, No Doubt..Ouch! Chris Cornell. ... ?) One act after another has fallen into the ocean. Being signed to the Universal conglomerate has been like being trapped on a cruise on the Mary Celeste. The lights are on but nobody's home.

Johnson also took the time to credit select individuals within these corporations, who were overpowered by the merges, stating "There are many decent, hard working people in this company who wanted to work in the music business for all the right reasons, but now find their hands are tied behind their backs as they are not allowed to get behind the projects they really believe in."

Along with the essay, Johnson made a bold move at the time, by opting to give away NakedSelf for free on The The's website, on a track by track, weekly basis. He stated:

As Universal/Interscope seem either incapable or unwilling (or both) to distribute and promote my album properly, and as they've refused to give it back to me, then I've been forced to consider alternative ways of reaching my audience. After much deliberation I have therefore decided to offer free downloads of NakedSelf on a song by song/week by week basis from my official site. www.thethe.com. By doing so I hope more people (including the bulk of my audience) will finally get the chance to hear this album and hopefully support me by purchasing this CD and future releases. For me to just walk away from NakedSelf now would be like leaving a baby on a doorstep and I just can't do it. I believe in this album too much.

In the wake of the essay, the relationship between The The and Interscope/Universal became very publicly toxic. Plans for a second single for "TheWhisperers," made it as far as a promo single pressing. Plans were in the works for a follow-up Interpertations: Issue 2 - TheWhisperers, but these plans were scrapped. The The then parted ways with Nothing Records.

In 2002, after their departure from Nothing Records, The The returned to their former label, Epic, with whom Johnson still had an amicable relationship, to revisit the band's back catalogue. The band released a best-of collection, entitled 45 RPM: The Singles of The The, which included two new songs, "Pillar Box Red" and "Deep Down Truth." The band also released the London Town 1983 - 1993 box set, which was composed of remastered reissues of their albums Soul Mining, Infected, Mind Bomb and Dusk, as well as an exclusive fifth disc, featuring a soundtrack piece called "In The AM." The reissued albums were all also released individually, featuring new cover artwork.

In June 2002, The The played the Meltdown Festival in at London's Royal Festival Music Hall as guests of David Bowie. The performance consisted of Matt Johnson and J. G. Thirlwell performing tapes and loops before video projections. Also available at the show was an exclusive double CD, entitled Film Music. The first disc, called Silent Tongue, consisted of unreleased film music, while the second disc was the 45 RPM collection. It was never made available again after the show and remains one of the most sought-after releases amongst fans. The performance also remains The The's final show to date, although Johnson has announced a series of new The The shows for 2018; their first in 16 years.

After 2002, Johnson entered a long-term, self-imposed exile from the music industry, with only sparse releases of the band, all self-released through Johnson's Lazarus label. In 2007, the band released a single for a new song, entitled "Mrs Mac", an autobiographical song about Johnson's first day at school as a child. In 2010, they released a CD soundtrack to the film Tony, which was directed by Matt Johnson's brother, Gerard Johnson. In 2012, they released a soundtrack to the film Moonbug, directed by Nichola Bruce. In 2015, the band released another soundtrack to the film Hyena, also directed by Johnson's brother Gerard. In 2017, the film The Inertia Variations, directed by Johanna St. Michaels began playing the film festival circuit. The documentary chronicles the band's career. To celebrate the release of the film, the band released a new 7-inch single, "We Can't Stop What's Coming" for Record Store Day in 2017, collaborating once again with Johnny Marr.

Johnson has become known as a reclusive artist, staying far removed from the public eye for most of the time since NakedSelf. However, he has sporadically released 15-minute broadcasts during his sabbatical, called Radio Cinéola, available for download from the band's website. The Radio Cinéola broadcasts have featured quite a number of rare and unreleased The The songs, including several from the band's era with Nothing Records. Episode 6 of the show, entitled "Blue Moon in June," featured the song "Justice 4 Jesus," which is from yet another unreleased album from the band, entitled Karmic Gravity. Originally announced under the name of Two Blocks Below Canal, the album was later re-titled Karmic Gravity. Alongside Gun Sluts and NakedSelf, it comprises The The's "New York Trilogy" of albums, all of which were recorded while Johnson was living in New York. Of the three, to date, only NakedSelf has been released. The same, sixth episode of Radio Cinéola also featured a previously unreleased song from Gun Sluts, entitled "Psychic Sauna," as well as an unreleased "GlobalEyes (Alternate Version)" from NakedSelf. Episode 11, entitled "Remember, Remember," features the song "Body Bonfire," an unreleased instrumental from NakedSelf, while episode 12, entitled "Blow, Blow Thou Winter Wind," features "Phantom Walls (Live with Eric Schermerhorn)," an unreleased live version of the song from NakedSelf. Episode 14, entitled "Deep Space", also features "Shrunken Man (Lunar Version)," an alternate version of the track from NakedSelf.

Rumors have persisted for years of a new studio album being in the works, but to date, nothing has been officially announced. However, in the wake of the success of the "We Can't Stop What's Coming" single, The The announced a series of live shows for 2018, which sold out immediately. They also announced a box set, Radio Cineola Trilogy: A Broadcast by The The, featuring three albums. The first, The End of the Day, features songs, interpretations and performances. The second album, The Inertia Variations, features poetry, soundscapes and spoken word. The third album, Midnight to Midnight, features electronic scores, political commentary and broadcasts. The flurry of activity in 2017 and 2018 marks a decided shift for the band, once again stepping forward into the public eye, after nearly two decades of self-imposed seclusion from the mainstream.

The The's departure from Nothing, in particular, seemed to mirror the greater problems dogging Nothing Records in their later years, as their roster became increasingly depleted and their reputation shifted into being known for corporate red tape and artistic futility, rather than the artistic freedom it was founded upon, signifying the beginning of the end for the label. It was fitting then that The The would become the final band to ever sign with the label.

== 2004–07: End of the label ==
=== Coil ===
Coil holds a unique place in history of Nothing Records, being one of the first acts to sign to the label, as well as remaining one of the final acts at the end of the label, all the while having released no material during their entire tenure on the roster. John Balance and Peter "Sleazy" Christopherson founded Coil in 1982 in London, England, after collaborating on a few side projects and following their departure from Psychic TV. Other collaborators, such as Drew McDowall and Danny Hyde, would frequently record with the band, some becoming members for a time. By the time Coil arrived at Nothing Records, they had released three studio albums. Scatology and Horse Rotorvator were released on Force & Form, which was manufactured and distributed by K.422, a sister label of Some Bizzare Records. Love's Secret Domain was released on Torso in Europe and the seminal Wax Trax! Records in the United States. These albums has helped establish Coil as one of the premiere acts in experimental and industrial, prior to joining Nothing Records.

Following the success of Love's Secret Domain, Coil began work on a new studio album in 1992, entitled Backwards. In 1993, a tape believed to have been a studio demo intended for the Boudisque/Torso labels was leaked as a bootleg cassette. In 1994, however, Boudisque went bankrupt and Torso shut down operations, leaving the Backwards material without a home. The cassette demo's tracklist consisted of eight songs; "Heaven's Blade," "Wir-Click-Wir," "Elves," "Simenon," "In My Blood," "Spastiche," "Crumb Time" and "March of Time."

Trent Reznor had been a longtime admirer of Coil, stating their "'Tainted Love' video remains one of the greatest music videos of all time. I was always more attracted to Coil than Throbbing Gristle; the darkness and the scatology really chimed with me. If it's not immediately obvious: Horse Rotorvator was deeply influential on me. What they did to your senses. What they could do with sound. What Jhonn was doing lyrically. The exotic darkness of them permeated their work."

In addition to his work in Coil, Peter Christopherson was an established music video and commercial director, having worked with artists such as Rage Against the Machine, Filter, Robert Plant, future Nothing Records label-mates The The and many more. It would be through his directing work that Reznor would first reach out to Christopherson, seeking to hire him as director for Nine Inch Nails' Broken film. Reznor recalled, "I figured that if I hired (Sleazy) as a director, then I could at least meet him and hang out for a bit. We established a friendship, and that friendship was very valuable to me. Making the Broken movie was a lot of fun. There was no label involvement or pressure from anyone, it was just he and I talking.

Christopherson accepted Reznor's offer and went off to film material for the Broken movie, which he felt was so realistic, he informed Reznor, "I'm going to send it to you, but it's going to show up in a paper bag unmarked because there could be ... I'm not sure I want the authorities knowing this came from me." After reviewing the film, Reznor stated, "It felt like we'd crossed over into territory that was perhaps too far. And to be honest, at that point I was living in the Sharon Tate house recording The Downward Spiral. Anyway, that's where I was living when this package turned up, and I thought, 'Enough. I don't know that I need this kind of thing.' With the house it felt too stunty, and Peter agreed."

In spite of opting to leave the Broken movie unreleased, it began to surface as a bootleg, eventually making its way onto the Internet. "We shelved it, but little did we know that the Internet would come into existence, and it would find its home on there," stated Reznor. In addition to the Broken movie, Christpherson directed music videos for the Nine Inch Nails songs "Wish" and "Gave Up."

Amidst these visual collaborations, Reznor also invited Coil to sign with Nothing Records. They are believed to be one of the earliest artists to have joined the label, signing a multi-album deal. Prior to their arrival at Nothing, Coil already had several ties to other acts on the label. Meat Beat Manifesto had remixed Coil's song "The Snow," calling their remix "Answers Come In Dreams." The band would revive this title for their 2010 album of the same name. Peter Christopherson had previously directed several music video for Nothing Records act The The, for their songs "Infected," "Heartland" and "The Mercy Beat." Autechre widely praised Coil as one of their primary musical influences, and even planned musical collaborations together at one point.

In 1992, Trent Reznor also invited Coil to remix the Nine Inch Nails song "Gave Up" for their Fixed EP and their collaborations would continue with the release of The Downward Spiral. Christopherson would direct the music video for "March of the Pigs" and also received a director's credit for the Nine Inch Nails' home video Closure. Coil would also do remixes for the Nine Inch Nails releases Closer to God (alongside fellow Nothing Records label-mates Meat Beat Manifesto) and Further Down the Spiral. An alternate version of their "Closer (Precursor)" remix by Danny Hyde was used in the opening credits to the 1995 David Fincher film Seven.

In 1995, Coil began work on their first release for Nothing Records, which they decided would be the Backwards album. With the Torso demo material already completed, the band decided to head into Reznor's Nothing Studios in New Orleans to re-record the material, as well as write new music. Recording at Nothing Studios began in June 1995 and was completed by January of 1997. Trent Reznor did not perform, produce or write any material for it. John Balance recalled, "We produced it ourselves, with Danny Hyde as engineer and with excellent help, complete co-operation and enormous investment of time, energy and genuine enthusiasm from all the people at Hot Snakes studio (a.k.a. Nothing Studios). In particular Chris Vrenna, who helped us iron out technical stuff, Brian the studio manager, who kept it running smoothly, and of course Trent himself, who kept out of our way while letting us loose in his secret domain."

During this time, Reznor would once again invite Coil to do a remix for the Nine Inch Nails song "The Perfect Drug." This time, however, Coil declined to participate, citing lack of time, due to the recording of Backwards.. In spite of this, Peter Christpherson did assist on two Trent Reznor songs; "Videodrones; Questions" and "Driver Down," for the soundtrack to David Lynch's Lost Highway, also released on Nothing Records. Reznor had lobbied for Coil to take on a greater role in composing music for Lynch's films, but Lynch declined. John Balance recalled, "You know, with Lost Highway, Trent literally forced (us) down David Lynch's throat, saying 'Look, please put this Coil stuff on.' You know, he really did help to get us on that soundtrack, but he (Lynch) wasn't interested. He wanted David Bowie, he wanted Marilyn Manson, he wanted whomever he could get. He just said, 'These people are really big. I want this film to be really big.' He didn't give a fuck about the integrity."

Initially abandoning the title of Backwards, the band announced the album would be called International Dark Skies. However, after NBC announced a TV series named Dark Skies, the band abandoned the name. For a time, they began calling the album God Please Fuck My Mind for Good, then Fire of the Mind and The World Ended a Long Time Ago, before later returning to the name International Dark Skies, with Balance commenting, "I'm not letting a bad TV program change my vision of the world." However, the band eventually would circle back to referring to the material simply as Backwards.

In addition to the Backwards album, a companion remix album was also once in the plans for release on Nothing Records. John Balance commented, "We are planning to involve a whole bunch of people in remixing tracks from our new Nothing album, including Steven Stapleton of Nurse with Wound, Autechre, Charlie Clouser and others we haven't asked yet, so it would be unfair to speculate on.". In addition, Nothing also planned to re-issue the first two Coil albums, Scatology and Horse Rotorvator. However, the rights to these albums became caught up in a dispute between Coil and their former label, Some Bizzare Records. John Balance recalled in 1999, "We have no news over Nothing releasing Horse Rotorvator and Scatology, because we gave them it about 5 years ago and had it legally able to be released in the U.S., but Nothing's lawyers were unhappy with a slightly less than watertight legal situation, so didn't go ahead." Balance would go on to claim that Some Bizzare label owner Stephen "Stevo" Pearce initially agreed to the Nothing re-issues, before later demanding more money, stating, "Since that, that fucking arsehole [sic] Stevo Pearce has reared his very unpleasant head again and asked Nothing for more money and generally thrown a spanner in the works. He originally gave Coil permission to give it to Nothing as part of a half-hearted attempt to be nice to us and make some amends, including financial, for the terrible way he has continued to treat us over the fate of these two records. Actaually he wasn't trying to be nice, he was trying to cover his ass for some early crap he tried to pull off."

In 1997, Some Bizzare reissued both albums in the UK, against the wishes of the band. Coil released a message to fans urging them not to support these reissues, claiming they were unauthorized, due to the fact that Some Bizzare had not settled with them on unpaid royalties for the albums. John Balance even went as far as cursing the reissues. In response to the Some Bizzare reissues, Coil remastered and reissued both albums themselves, on their own Threshold House label. The covers to both albums featured a message to Some Bizzare label owner "Stevo" Pearce, stating "Stevo, pay us what you owe us!"

Coil provided intermit updates on Backwards over the course of 1997, stating that the album was held up for countless reasons. Meanwhile, the band remained prolific, recording numerous new releases, including Moons Milk (In Four Phases), Musick To Play In The Dark Vol. 1 and Musick To Play In The Dark Vol. 2. Over the following years, while Backwards never saw a release, the band would occasionally comment on the album and Nothing Records, always insisting they were still a part of the label. "For the record it is us, Coil, who are delaying over this particular title. Not Trent or Nothing, who have been very, very quiet about it all and have waited patiently for it," they wrote in 1999.

In 1999, Coil began performing live for the first time. On June 18, 2001, the entire 1993 Backwards demo was broadcast on Dutch radio station Radio 4, when they hosted Coil as in-studio guests to coincide with a live performance on June 1, 2001. A four disc CD-R set of the entire broadcast was released in an unknown quantity as Dutch Radio4 Supplement. The Backwards demos became widely circulated on the Internet. Three extra tracks, "Bee Has the Photos," "Egyptian Basses," and a different version of "Spastiche" became circulated with the demos online over time.

In 2004, after a legal dispute arose between Trent Reznor and Nothing Records president John Malm Jr., Reznor officially declared the label defunct, with no Coil albums having ever seen release on the label. That same year, John Balance would tragically die in a fall inside of his own home. Peter Christopherson announced that Coil would not continue as a band. However, he would focus on the band's back-catalogue, which including revisiting the Nothing Records material.

In 2005, Coil announced the release of The Ape of Naples on their own Threshold House label. The album was considered to be the final version of their once-intended Nothing Records material, featuring updated versions of five tracks recorded at Nothing Studios; "Fire of the Mind," "It's In My Blood," "I Don't Get It," "Heaven's Blade," "Cold Cell" and "Amber Rain." It also featured other songs that are believed to have been originally created around the time of Backwards. The band also included a thank you to Trent Reznor and Nothing Records in the liner notes. In 2007, Important Records reissued The Ape Of Naples on LP, alongside a companion album of material, called The New Backwards. The New Backwards was later made available separately as a CD in 2008. The album featured additional material from the Nothing album sessions, remixed by Peter Christopherson and Danny Hyde in 2007.

Peter Christopherson died in his sleep on November 25, 2010. Just prior to his death, Christopherson gave permission to Trent Reznor to use the name How To Destroy Angels for his new band he was launching. The name was derived from Coil's first 12" single. Trent Reznor even stated that prior to his death, Christopherson claimed to be working on music to contribute to How To Destroy Angels, commenting "Around that time I reached out to him, iPads had just come out and I sent him one (with the music on it), because he was in Thailand and away from technology. I just wanted to make sure that he was ok with it, because clearly I wouldn't have done it without his blessing. He mentioned, 'Hey, I've got some stuff that I'm working on which could be interesting (for How To Destroy Angels)... it could be interesting, but it could also be way outside the realms of anything that you'd be interested in. We could work together, and maybe under the umbrella of How To Destroy Angels.' And I said, 'Please do. Send whatever you have.' And nothing ever showed up - he passed away not long after that. So sadly I didn't get to hear what he had planned."

In 2012, members of the Nine Inch Nails fan-site echoingthesound.org were able to raise funds to send to Danny Hyde, who had revealed the existence of outtakes of commissioned work Coil had produced for various Nine Inch Nails singles and EPs. Once a suitable amount had been raised, Hyde torrented the tracks to fans via The Pirate Bay. Danny Hyde later licensed the songs to British label Cold Spring. On February 24, 2014, Cold Spring released the remixes under the name Recoiled on 12". The album artwork was created by a member of EchoingTheSound and closely resembles Russell Mills' frayed rope design for Further Down the Spiral. The songs were released and marketed as "Coil & Nine Inch Nails," despite the fact that Trent Reznor is the sole writer on all tracks and remains uncredited in all editions of the release.

On October 9, 2015, Cold Spring released Coil's original Backwards album, which was once again arranged through Danny Hyde. This marked the first time the Nothing Records material had been released as was originally intended for the label, with no further remixing or additional songs. No mention of Nothing Records is given on the album, with the liner notes swapping out a Nothing Studios credit with "Magazine Studios, New Orleans" (Magazine Street being the former location of Nothing Studios). In November of that same year, Danny Hyde himself also published the album for download on his website, offering six additional bonus tracks, primarily consisting of alternate versions of the album songs; "Spactiche," "Heaven's Blade - 98 Jams," "Wur Click - 98 Lo Chords," "Mellotron Song," "Heaven's Blade - 96 Vox Version" and "Wur Click - 98 Tk3 Vox Bits." Hyde also included a digital insert on his website for the download version, featuring his own liner notes, which give special thanks to Trent Reznor and former Nine Inch Nails member Chris "Pod" Vrenna, for their inspiration and tech.

Despite having never released anything on Nothing Records, the band remains widely associated with the label. The vast catalogue of Coil remains highly sought after by collectors and fans, while their music has gone on to influence countless musicians, such as Alec Empire, Chris Connelly, Autechre, K.K. Null and Nine Inch Nails. Coil's unfulfilled multi-album deal with Nothing Records can be loosely retraced through comments from the band throughout their tenure on the label. Scatology, Horse Rotorvator, Backwards and an incomplete Backwards remix album were all intended for release on Nothing at various points. To date, all of the material has seen release outside of Nothing Records, with the exception of the unfinished remix project for Backwards.

== Nothing Studios ==
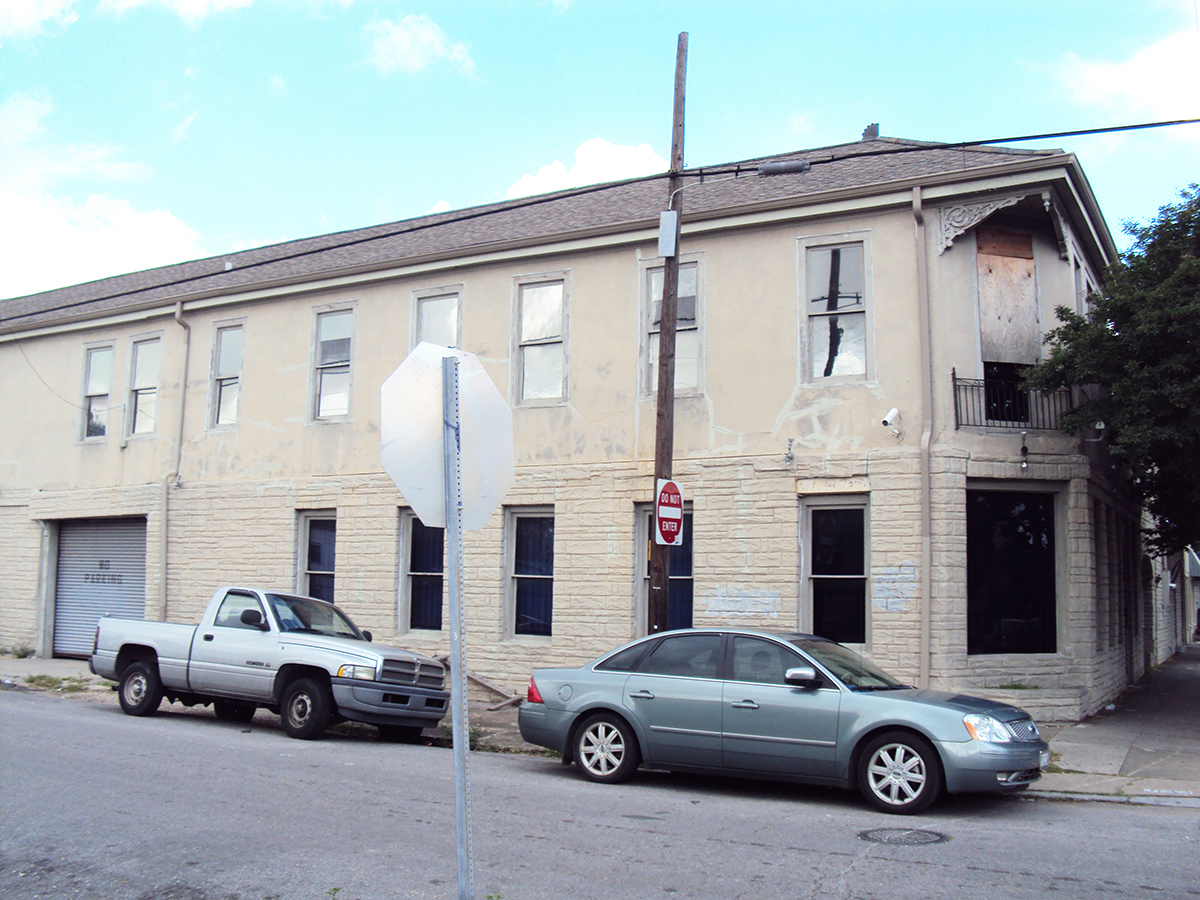
The former site of Nothing Studios.

Nothing Studios was a recording studio located within an early-1900s building at 4500 Magazine Street in Uptown New Orleans that had formerly housed a funeral home. Reznor established the studio in April 1995. Marilyn Manson recorded Smells Like Children (1995) and Antichrist Superstar (1996) at the studio, and Nine Inch Nails recorded The Fragile (1999) and portions of And All That Could Have Been (2002) there. The studio, which had a 72-input Solid State Logic SL 4000G Plus mixing console and two Studer A800 multitrack tape recorders, expanded for commercial business in early 2000.

In 2004 during an interview on KROQ-FM's Breakfast with Kevin and Bean show, Reznor stated that the New Orleans recording studio was no longer a studio. The following year, he documented the aftermath of Hurricane Katrina on his former recording studio and the surrounding area by posting a collection of photos on nin.com, after which his band played a scheduled concert (which had become a benefit for the survivors). The property changed ownership in 2011 and was remodeled into a retail space.

The front door of Nothing Studios was the front door of the Tate mansion where the Manson family murders took place. Reznor, who had leased the house and knew the owner was planning on demolishing it, requested and received the door after moving out in December 1993, and subsequently installed the door at Nothing Studios' entrance. Reznor left the door at the New Orleans recording studio when he relocated back to Los Angeles, and after the building changed ownership in 2011 and was remodeled, The door was in the possession of Christopher Moore, a New Orleans artist who acquired it from the owner of Nothing Studios, and was sold to an undisclosed buyer for $127,000 by Julien’s Auctions in September 2023.

== See also ==
- List of record labels
- Nothing Records catalog
