= Kammerkonzert (album) =

2026 studio album

Studio album by Squarepusher
- Released: 10 April 2026
- Genres: Chamber; electronic; IDM; jazz
- Length: 62:43
- Label: Warp
- Producer: Tom Jenkinson

Squarepusher chronology
Dostrotime (2024)	Kammerkonzert (2026)

Singles from Kammerkonzert
- 1. "K2 Central" Released: 25 February 2026; 2. "K7 Museum" Released: 18 March 2026

Kammerkonzert is the seventeenth studio album by British electronic musician Tom Jenkinson, under the pseudonym Squarepusher. The album was released on 10 April 2026 through Warp Records. Comprising chamber, electronic, IDM and jazz music, the album marked a departure from Jenkinson's usual sound, making frequent use of orchestral music. The album was received positively by critics.

== Background ==
Squarepusher, real name Tom Jenkinson, is a British electronic musician. Jenkinson signed to Warp in December 1995 where he would go on to release acclaimed albums such as Hard Normal Daddy and Ultravisitor. Jenkinson began to write music for orchestra in 2016 and workshopped material with professional musicians, though he was not satisfied with the outcome. After the COVID-19 pandemic which prevented large groups of people meeting, and a wrist injury preventing him from playing bass guitar, Jenkinson ended up recording all of Kammerkonzert himself.

== Music ==
Musically, Kammerkonzert has been described as a chamber, electronic, IDM, and jazz album. In comparison to Jenkinson's past albums, which were much more electronic-based and focused on primarily drill 'n' bass music, Kammerkonzert instead comprises multi-layered orchestral compositions. Tracks on the album often make extensive use of strings, horns, woodwinds, and live drums. Bill Pearis of BrooklynVegan noted how the album often recalls '70s jazz fusion. Critics noted various influences could be heard across the album's runtime, such as Ennio Morricone, Frank Zappa, Brian Eno and Magma.

"K2 Central" makes use of a "slow electro-funk drum machine rhythm", bass guitar, live and programmed drums and string arrangements throughout. One critic described the track as "the musical heart of the record" and "a protagonist's theme"; comparisons were made to Music is Rotted One Note as well. "K4 Fairlands" comprises breakbeat drums and "creeping" strings, eventually making use of synthesiser-based sequences. One critic noted: "Jenkinson's past bleeds into his present as timpani turn into squelchy beats and French horns give way to an 8-bit wall of sound". "K7 Museum" is a "berserk seven-minute prog-fusion instrumental". The track uses harpsichord and mallet percussion, and "crescendos with such compositional acuity that it borders on showstopping", according to one critic. "K10 Terminus", described as "head-spinning" and "irresistibly perky", combines orchestral composition similar to Mozart with drum 'n' bass percussion. "K13 Vigilant" is "gleeful and mind-bending", making use of sequenced glockenspiels in place of hi-hats.

== Release ==
Kammerkonzert was announced for release on 25 February 2026. "K2 Central" was released as the first single, with an accompanying music video produced by Jo Apps. A second single, "K7 Museum", was released on 18 March 2026; it was also accompanied by a music video. Kammerkonzert was released on vinyl and CD on 10 April through Warp. Bundles of the album with an exclusive print were also made available.

== Reception ==
Professional ratings
Aggregate scores
Source	Rating
Metacritic	82/100
Review scores
Source	Rating
AllMusic	4/5 stars
Slant Magazine	3/5 stars

Kammerkonzert was received positively by critics. At Metacritic, which aggregates scores from mainstream critics, Kammerkonzert has an average score of 82 based on 6 reviews, indicating a score of "universal acclaim".

In a review for AllMusic, Paul Simpson said the album would likely end up being one of Jenkinson's most divisive releases due to its musical style, though noted it was "still a fascinating release and a remarkable achievement". Bill Pearis of BrooklynVegan summarised how "circuits are swapped for chamber strings but Kammerkonzert still sounds like Squarepusher". Michael Cragg, in an article for The Guardian, called Kammerkonzert a "typically invigorating affair". Writing for The Quietus, Finn Cliff Hodges mentioned the album's "traditionalist roots" and how it "used orchestral music as its base camp", also stating how "as the music builds [Jenkinson] washes his wonderful, abstract pigments all over those traditionalist forms". Paul Attard of Slant Magazine concluded: "it's nothing Squarepusher hasn't done before, but it's rendered with the polish and executed with the ease of an artist who knows exactly how to make it land." An article for Tinnitist written by Darryl Sterdan said "Kammerkonzert displays Jenkinson's strength not only as a producer but as a composer, shown by the album's mercurial juxtapositions".

== Track listing ==
All tracks are written by Tom Jenkinson.

Kammerkonzert track listing
No.	Title	Length
1.	"K1 Advance"	2:16
2.	"K2 Central"	4:24
3.	"K3 Diligence"	4:11
4.	"K4 Fairlands"	5:06
5.	"K5 Fremantle"	7:26
6.	"K6 Headquarters"	4:58
7.	"K7 Museum"	6:55
8.	"K8 Park"	2:03
9.	"K9 Reliance"	3:32
10.	"K10 Terminus"	4:23
11.	"K11 Tideway"	5:22
12.	"K12 Uplands"	1:09
13.	"K13 Vigilant"	5:07
14.	"K14 Welbeck"	5:51
Total length:		62:43

== Personnel ==
Credits are adapted from the liner notes.

- Tom Jenkinson – performance, production
- Jason Mitchell – mastering
- Jo Apps – photography
- Sean Kuhnke – design

== Charts ==
Chart performance for Kammerkonzert
Chart (2026)	Peak position
Belgian Albums (Ultratop Flanders)	103
UK Albums Sales (OCC)	30
UK Independent Albums (Official Charts)	16
