= Yōichirō =

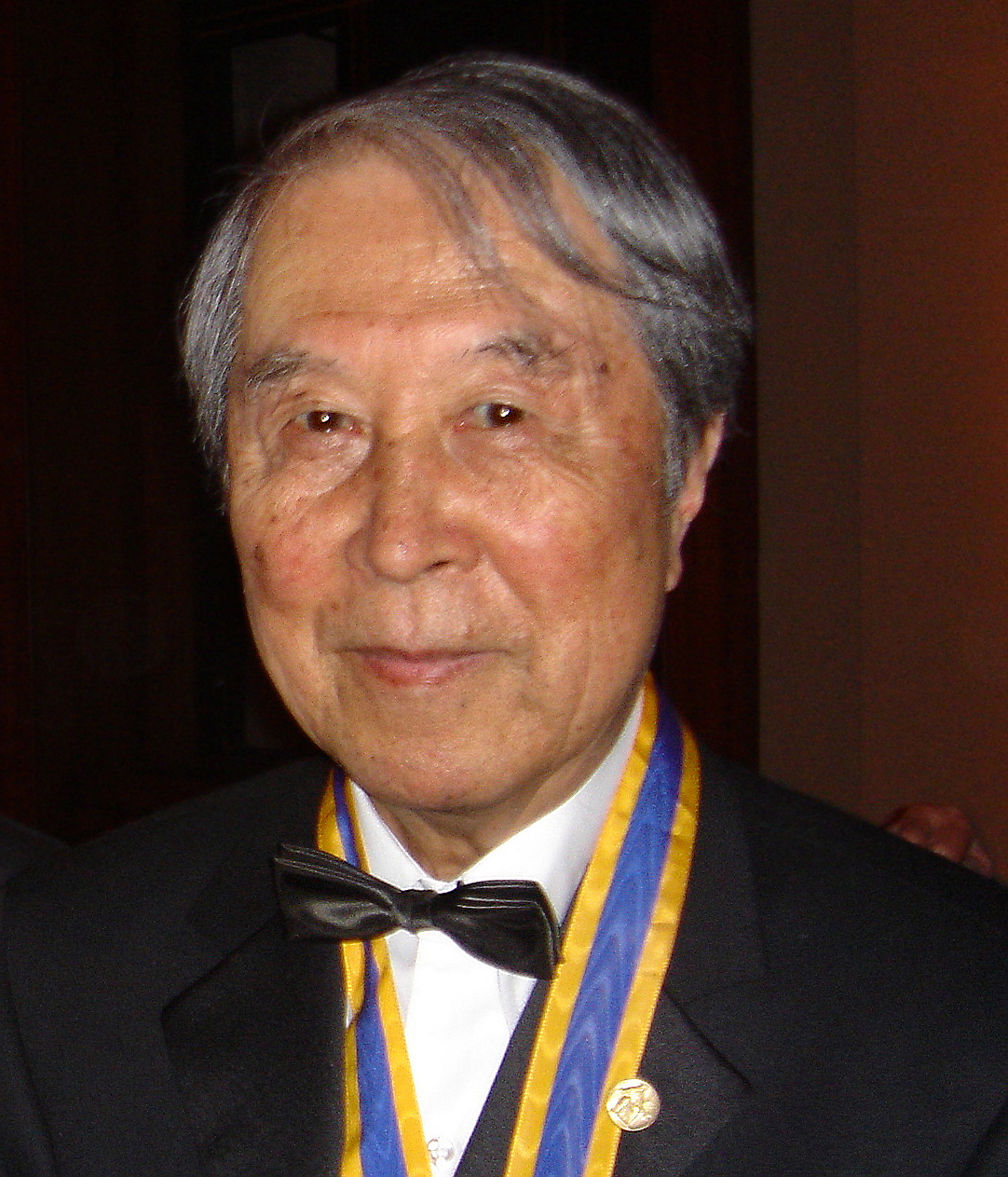
- Yoichiro Nambu (1921–2015), Japanese-American physicist
- Pronunciation: joɯitɕiɾoɯ (IPA)
- Gender: Male

Origin
- Origin: Japanese
- Meaning: Different meanings depending on the kanji used

Other names
- Alternative spelling: Yoitiro (Kunrei-shiki) Yoitiro (Nihon-shiki) Yōichirō, Yoichiro, Youichirou (Hepburn)

Yōichirō, Yoichiro, Youichirou or Yohichiroh is a masculine Japanese given name.

== Written forms ==
Yōichirō can be written using different combinations of kanji characters. Some examples:

The characters used for "ichiro" (一郎) literally means "first son" and usually used as a suffix to a masculine name, especially for the oldest son. The "yo" part of the name can use a variety of characters, each of which will change the meaning of the name ("洋" for ocean, "陽" for sunshine, "曜" and so on).

- 洋一郎, "ocean, first son"
- 陽一郎, "sunshine, first son"
- 庸一郎, "common, first son"
- 楊一郎, "willow, first son"
- 耀一郎, "shine, first son"

Other combinations...

- 陽市朗, "sunshine, city, clear"
- 耀市郎, "shine, city, son"
- 洋一朗, "ocean, one, clear"
- 蓉一朗, "lotus, one, clear"

The name can also be written in hiragana よういちろう or katakana ヨウイチロウ.

== Notable people with the name ==
- Yoichiro Esaki (江崎 洋一郎) (born 1958), Japanese politician
- Yoichiro Hirase (平瀬 與一郎) (1859–1925), Japanese malacologist
- Yoichiro Kakitani (柿谷 曜一朗) (born 1990), Japanese footballer
- Yoichiro Kawaguchi (河口 洋一郎) (born 1952), Japanese artist
- Yoichiro Morikawa (森川 陽一郎) (born 1979), Japanese film director, screenwriter and actor
- Yoichiro Murakami (村上 陽一郎) (born 1936), Japanese philosopher
- Yoichiro Nambu (南部 陽一郎) (1921–2015), Japanese-born American physicist
- Yoichiro Takahashi (高橋 陽一郎) (born 1963), Japanese film and television director
- Yoichiro Suzuki (鈴木 洋一郎; born 1952), Japanese particle physicist
- Yoichiro Yoshikawa (吉川 洋一郎; 1957–2026), Japanese composer, music arranger and film producer
