= Be Up a Hello =

Studio album by Squarepusher
- Released: 31 January 2020
- Genre: Drill and bass; IDM; jungle
- Length: 47:12
- Label: Warp
- Producer: Tom Jenkinson

Squarepusher chronology
All Night Chroma (2019)	Be Up a Hello (2020)	Dostrotime (2024)

Be Up a Hello is the twelfth studio album by British electronic musician Tom Jenkinson under the alias of Squarepusher. It was released through Warp Records on 31 January 2020. It is Jenkinson's first album under the Squarepusher alias in five years, following Damogen Furies (2015). The first single, "Vortrack", was released on 6 December 2019. The second single, "Nervelevers", was released on 8 January 2020. A release party was held at the Five Miles nightclub in London on 1 February 2020.

== Background ==
After the release of Damogen Furies, Jenkinson took a 5 year hiatus from releasing music under the Squarepusher alias. In 2018, he contributed music to Daydream, a 1 hour long programme meant to help children fall asleep. On 20 November 2019, Jenkinson released the single "Vortrack" onto streaming services. This included a "Fracture Remix". On 8 January 2020, Jenkinson released another single, titled "Nervelevers".

== Release ==
Be Up a Hello was officially released on 31 January 2020 by Warp. It was released on CD and LP. On the album, Jenkinson decided to reuse analogue synthesizers that he used in the early 1990s rather than his own technology that he developed and used on albums like Ufabulum (2012) and Damogen Furies (2015). Jenkinson also made use of vintage effects units and a VIC-20.

== Reception ==
Professional ratings
Aggregate scores
Source	Rating
Metacritic	76/100
Review scores
Source	Rating
AllMusic	4/5 stars
Pitchfork	6.4/10
The Guardian	3/5 stars
PopMatters	8/10

Be Up a Hello received generally favourable reviews from critics. At Metacritic, which assigns a normalized rating out of 100 to reviews from professional publications, the album received an average score of 76, based on 14 reviews, indicating 'generally favourable reviews'.

Reviewing the album for AllMusic, Fred Thomas said that "After several records of heady composition and high-concept music, Be Up a Hello is refreshingly direct." Shawn Reynaldo of Pitchfork commented that "For years, Squarepusher fans have been clamoring for Jenkinson to get back to his roots, and Be Up the Hello is the closest he's come to his '90s self in quite some time." Writing for The Quietus, Nick Roseblade said that "Be Up a Hello is Jenkinson's strongest album for a decade and is easily up there with his best work." Kyle Cochrun from PopMatters stated that "Jenkinson consistently delivers electronic albums jam-packed with ideas and vibrant tone color, of which Be Up a Hello slots in as yet another example of the creative colossus that is Squarepusher." Writing for Inverted Audio, Damien Cummings said that "In the end, Be Up a Hello is a fantastic addition to an already stellar canon of work, and while this album may remind you of his earlier work, it doesn't feel retro in the slightest."

== Track listing ==
Be Up a Hello track listing
No.	Title	Length
1.	"Oberlove"	3:51
2.	"Hitsonu"	4:13
3.	"Nervelevers"	5:29
4.	"Speedcrank"	5:53
5.	"Detroit People Mover"	4:27
6.	"Vortrack"	5:27
7.	"Terminal Slam"	4:56
8.	"Mekrev Bass"	7:11
9.	"80 Ondula"	5:45
Total length:		47:12

Japanese edition bonus track
No.	Title	Length
10.	"Vortrack" (Fracture Remix)	8:04
Total length:		55:16

== Charts ==
Chart performance for Be Up a Hello
Chart (2020)	Peak position
Belgian Albums (Ultratop Flanders)	70
Belgian Albums (Ultratop Wallonia)	166
Scottish Albums (OCC)	55
UK Albums (OCC)	77
