= Go Plastic =

Studio album by Squarepusher
- Released: 25 June 2001
- Genres: Breakcore; Drill 'n' bass
- Length: 48:39
- Label: Warp
- Producer: Tom Jenkinson

Squarepusher chronology
Selection Sixteen (1999)	Go Plastic (2001)	Do You Know Squarepusher (2002)

Singles from Go Plastic
- 1. "My Red Hot Car" Released: 21 May 2001

Go Plastic is the fifth studio album by British electronic musician Tom Jenkinson, under the alias of Squarepusher. It was released through Warp Records on 25 June 2001. It peaked at number 100 on the UK Albums Chart.

== Production ==
Unlike many of his earlier albums such as Hard Normal Daddy and Music Is Rotted One Note, which often prominently featured live instrumentation (particularly drums and bass guitar), the sound palette on Go Plastic is almost exclusively synthetic, with an emphasis on high-velocity breakbeats subjected to extensive manipulation and granular effects. In a contemporaneous interview, Squarepusher claimed to be "fed up" with real instruments, wanting everything "brutal and digital."

Despite this, the album was not produced using a computer, but rather by utilizing a range of hardware including the Eventide DSP4000 and Eventide Orville digital effects processors, Yamaha QY700 sequencers, Yamaha TX81Z and FS1R synthesizers, and an Akai S6000 sampler.

== Release ==
Go Plastic was released by Warp Records on 25 June 2001. It was released on both CD and 2xLP.

== Reception ==
Professional ratings
Aggregate scores
Source	Rating
Metacritic	70/100
Review scores
Source	Rating
AllMusic	4/5 stars
Hot Press	favorable
LA Weekly	favorable
NME	9/10
Pitchfork	5.1/10
Playlouder	5/5 stars
PopMatters	favorable
Rolling Stone	2/5 stars
The Rolling Stone Album Guide	3/5 stars

At Metacritic, which assigns a normalised rating out of 100 to reviews from mainstream critics, Go Plastic received an average score of 70, based on 17 reviews, indicating generally favorable reviews.

In 2015, Exclaim placed it at number 2 on its list of "an essential guide to Squarepusher".

== Track listing ==
Go Plastic track listing
No.	Title	Length
1.	"My Red Hot Car"	4:42
2.	"Boneville Occident"	4:50
3.	"Go! Spastic"	6:21
4.	"Metteng Excuske v1.2"	1:08
5.	"The Exploding Psychology"	6:43
6.	"I Wish You Could Talk"	4:53
7.	"Greenways Trajectory"	7:10
8.	"Tommib"	1:19
9.	"My Fucking Sound"	7:05
10.	"Plaistow Flex Out"	4:28
Total length:		48:21

Japanese bonus track
No.	Title	Length
11.	"Hardcore Obelisk"	5:24

== Charts ==
Chart	Peak position
UK Albums Chart (OCC)	100
