= Bio-Sensor =

- Directed by: Takashi Fukumoto
- Produced by: Takashi Fukumoto (Toyolinks Corporation); Hitoshi Nishimura (Osaka University)
- Production companies: Osaka University Computer Graphics Research Group; Toyo Links Corporation; Bio-Meta Team
- Release date: 1984
- Running time: 4 minutes
- Country: Japan

Bio-Sensor (バイオセンサー, Baiosensa) is a 1984 Japanese animated surreal short film produced by Takashi Fukumoto at Toyo Links and Hitoshi Nishimura at Osaka University. It's notable for its early use of primitive motion capture, using profile and head-on films of a tiger walking (a la Muybridge).

== Crew ==
- Producer: Takashi Fukumoto (Toyo Links), Hitoshi Nishimura (Osaka University)
- Digitizers: Hiroyuki Hayashi, Masuharu Endo, Taku Kimura, Noriaki Murashima, Chiharu Kajitsuka, Shinji Tanaka, Hiroshi Yoshimura, Koji Ichihashi

=== Special thanks ===
==== Osaka University ====
- Koichi Omura
- Isao Shirakawa
- Makoto Hirai
- Masato Nishida
- Takashi Yamana
- Nariyoshi Yamai
- Hirohisa Wakai

==== Nippon Electronics College ====
- Yoichiro Kawaguchi
- Suma Noji
- Yuzuru Nakamura

== French parody ==
Sio-Benbor is a 1988 French parody of Bio-Sensor, created by a French company, Fantôme. It's notable for having a “really cute kitty” cat.
