= Star Time =

Star Time or Startime may refer to:

- Star Time (album), a 1991 box set by James Brown
- Star Time (film), a 1992 American horror film
- Star Time (TV series), a 1950–1951 American variety show that aired on the DuMont network
- Startime (American TV series), a 1959–1960 American anthology series that was broadcast on NBC
- Startime (Australian TV series), a 1962–1963 Australian variety show
- Startime International, a record label
- "Star Time 1", a song by Squarepusher from the 2009 album Numbers Lucent
