= Welcome to Europe =

"Welcome To Europe"

Single by Squarepusher
- A-side: "Welcome To Europe"
- B-side: "Hanningfield Window", "Exciton"
- Released: 2006
- Label: Warp Records WAP 215
- Songwriter: Tom Jenkinson
- Producer: Tom Jenkinson

Welcome To Europe is a single/song released as a 12" vinyl record by Squarepusher for the album Hello Everything, although the songs were made available previously through Bleep.com (all three in MP3 and two in FLAC formats).

== Welcome To Europe ==
"Welcome to Europe" was originally released as an MP3 file (320kbs) on bleep.com on September 4, 2006. On October 16, 2006 the song was released on the album Hello Everything. The song was then pressed as an A-Side on the single of the same name.

== Hanningfield Window ==
"Hanningfield Window" was originally released in MP3 (320kbs) and FLAC formats on bleep.com on September 18, 2006. On October 11, 2006 the song was released on the Japanese pressing of Hello Everything. The song was then released as a B-Side to the 12" vinyl single "Welcome to Europe".

== Exciton ==
"Exciton" was originally released in MP3 (320kbs) and FLAC formats on October 2, 2006. On October 11, 2006 the song was released on the Japanese pressing of Hello Everything. The song was then released as a B-Side to the 12" vinyl single "Welcome to Europe".

== Track listing ==
Side A

1. "Welcome To Europe" - 4:32

Side B

1. "Hanningfield Window" - 4:20
2. "Exciton" - 4:10
