= Step 1 (disambiguation) =

USMLE Step 1 is the first exam conducted in the process of medical licensing in the United States.

Step 1 may also refer to:

- Step 1 (album) and its track "Step One" by Jimmy McGriff
- Step One, a 1998 album by Steps
- "Step 1", a song by Squarepusher from Music Is Rotted One Note
- Step One Records, a record label based in Nashville, Tennessee
