= My Red Hot Car =

Single by Squarepusher

from the album Go Plastic
- Released: 21 May 2001
- Genre: 2-step garage, breakcore
- Length: 46:26 (CD); 20:22 (vinyl)
- Label: Warp; WAP147 (UK, 12"); WAP147CD (UK, CD)
- Songwriter: Tom Jenkinson
- Producer: Tom Jenkinson

Squarepusher singles chronology
"Vic Acid" (1997)	"My Red Hot Car" (2001)	"Do You Know Squarepusher" (2001)

"My Red Hot Car" is a song by Squarepusher, released as a single in 2001 on Warp Records. The lead track on the single is "My Red Hot Car (Girl)", which leaves the pop music aspects of the song intact. An extended version of "My Red Hot Car" is featured on the album Go Plastic. The single is notable for two different hidden tracks, based on format: the CD version features an ambient piece after 23 minutes of silence, while the vinyl features a percussion-less version of "I Wish You Obelisk" presented behind a silent, locked groove, meaning the needle must be lifted halfway through the second side and placed after the locked groove in order to hear it.

The single was selected as NME's Single of the Week in its week of release.

== Track listing ==
=== Compact disc pressing ===
No.	Title	Length
1.	"My Red Hot Car (Girl)"	5:01
2.	"My Red Hot Car"	4:18
3.	"Hardcore Obelisk"	5:25
4.	"I Wish You Obelisk" (includes hidden track beginning at 26:33)	31:40
Total length:		46:26

=== Vinyl pressing ===
Side A
No.	Title	Length
1.	"My Red Hot Car (Girl)"	5:01
2.	"My Red Hot Car"	4:18
Total length:		9:19

Side B
No.	Title	Length
1.	"Hardcore Obelisk"	5:25
2.	"I Wish You Obelisk"	3:34
3.	"I Wish You Obelisk (remix)"	2:05
Total length:		11:04

== Song usage ==
Miss Kittin used "My Red Hot Car" on her mix album A Bugged Out Mix.
