= Venus No. 17 =

EP by Squarepusher
- Released: 12 July 2004
- Genre: Drum and bass; techno
- Label: Warp Records
- Producer: Tom Jenkinson

Squarepusher chronology
Ultravisitor (2004)	Venus No. 17 (2004)	Hello Everything (2006)

Venus No. 17 Maximised

Venus No. 17 is an extended play by English electronic musician Tom Jenkinson under the alias Squarepusher. It was released on 12 July 2004 through Warp Records. It was originally issued as a 12" vinyl record and a promotional CD.

In 2024, the EP was re-released and remastered for the first time under the name Venus No. 17 Maximised. This remastered EP was released with the 20th anniversary edition of Ultravisitor as a bonus disc, and compiled extra songs not present on the original, such as the Square Window EP, which was a promotional CD given out with WarpMart preorders of Ultravisitor.

Some of the tracks from the EP appear on other releases from Jenkinson; the song "Venus No. 17" also appears on Square Window, and the song "Tundra 4" is a reworking of "Tundra" from his debut album, Feed Me Weird Things.

== Track listing ==
=== Venus No. 17 ===
Sides indicated are for the vinyl version.

Side one
No.	Title	Length
1.	"Venus No. 17"	6:35
2.	"Venus No. 17 (Acid Mix)"	5:33
Total length:		12:08

Side two
No.	Title	Length
1.	"Tundra 4"	12:40
Total length:		12:40

Promo CD release
No.	Title	Length
1.	"Venus No. 17"	6:44
2.	"Venus No. 17 (Acid Mix)"	5:39
3.	"Tundra 4"	12:40
Total length:		25:30

=== Venus No. 17 Maximised ===
Sides indicated are for the vinyl version. All tracks are remastered

Side one
No.	Title	Length
1.	"Square Window"	5:00
2.	"Abacus 2"	5:14
3.	"Venus No. 17"	6:44
4.	"Itti-Fack"	0:45
5.	"Melt 14.6"	2:00
Total length:		19:43

Side two
No.	Title	Length
1.	"Venus No. 17 (Acid Mix)"	5:38
2.	"Tundra 4"	12:39
3.	"Talk About Me & You"	3:07
Total length:		21:24
