= Squeak =

Squeak may refer to:

- Squeak (programming language)
- Squeak!, a 2003 children's television series
- Squeak, a type of animal sound
- Squeak, a fictional character from the Doctor Who episode "Survival"
- Squeak, a fictional character from the comic strip Garfield
- "Squeak", a song by Squarepusher (credited as Tom Jenkinson) from Bubble and Squeak
