= Ultravisitor =

Studio album by Squarepusher
- Released: 8 March 2004
- Genre: Drum and bass; musique concrète; nu jazz; IDM
- Length: 79:41
- Label: Warp
- Producer: Tom Jenkinson

Squarepusher chronology
Do You Know Squarepusher (2002)	Ultravisitor (2004)	Venus No. 17 (2004)

Ultravisitor is the seventh studio album by English electronic musician Tom Jenkinson, under the alias of Squarepusher. It was released on 8 March 2004 through Warp Records. In September 2024, Jenkinson announced a remaster of the album to commemorate its 20th anniversary, as well as an expanded and remastered edition of Venus No. 17, which was released on 25 October 2024.

== Background ==
The album incorporates many of the various musical styles exhibited by Jenkinson on his previous albums, including drum and bass, acid techno, jazz fusion, and electronic noise. A few of the tracks feature layered, modulated, or filtered bass guitar.

In an interview with I-D, Jenkinson confirmed that most of the tracks on Ultravisitor were recorded from shows in the UK, US and Canada. "The point of using live versions of the tracks is that they show stupid people that, though their own stubbornness prevents them from being able to engage with my music, they hear other people cheering in the background, and realise that although this music is obscure, it cannot be totally inaccessible because other people like it."

Jenkinson has stated that the track "50 Cycles" took over a month to complete; "I think the most time-consuming was 50 Cycles on Ultravisitor. Roughly speaking it took a month to make. This was the last piece to be completed on Ultravisitor, which contains several other pieces that also took unprecedentedly long to complete."

== Release ==
Ultravisitor was released on 8 March 2004. It was released on standard and special edition CDs, as well as on 2xLP. The special edition of the album came with a hardbound case and six page booklet. Jenkinson has stated that "Ultravisitor is my spectacle of beauty and of terror. It is unknowable, and will never be understood by anybody, least of all its creator.

== Anniversary Edition ==
On 19 September 2024, Warp Records announced that the album would be remastered and reissued to coincide with its 20th anniversary. The reissue also included a bonus album, Venus No. 17 Maximised. This album consisted of material derived from the promo-only EP, Square Window, which was given out with original WarpMart pre-orders of Ultravisitor, as well as the Venus No. 17 EP. The reissue was released on 20 October 2024, on 2xCD, 2xLP and streaming services.

== Reception ==
Professional ratings
Aggregate scores
Source	Rating
Metacritic	74/100
Review scores
Source	Rating
AllMusic	4.5/5 stars
The Daily Telegraph	(favourable)
The Guardian	3/5 stars
The Independent	3/5 stars
The Observer	4/5 stars
Pitchfork	7.9/10

At Metacritic, which assigns a normalised rating out of 100 to reviews from mainstream critics, Ultravisitor received an average score of 74, based on 21 reviews, indicating a score of "generally favorable".

Ultravisitor was generally well received by critics. Reviewing the album for Pitchfork, Dominique Leone of gave the album a positive review, stating "In some ways, Ultravisitor is the only Squarepusher album you need to know about. It contains instances of every idea, texture or beat he's presented until now, and unlike recent releases Do You Know Squarepusher or Go Plastic, little of it sounds stale." Writing for AllMusic, John Bush called the album "vastly more impressive than anyone could've expected from Squarepusher". Joshua Ostroff of Exclaim! said it was "an album of surprising heart and laid-back calm, albeit still boasting bursts of mayhem."

Other critics were not so positive, however; reviewing the album for The Observer, Emma Warren said "There will be people who think of Squarepusher's music as the kind of clever and very important racket they should like - but never actually want to listen to. And if one fast-forwarded to the middle of 29-year-old Tom Jenkinson's ninth album, you'd be forgiven for thinking they were right." Additionally, Leone also commented that "At almost 80 minutes, Ultravisitor contains too much music to really hold together as a cohesive statement." Dorian Lynskey of The Guardian gave the album three stars, saying that "Ultravisitor is yet another scattershot Squarepusher album [...] that infuriates as often as it delights."

== Track listing ==
All tracks written and produced by Tom Jenkinson.

Ultravisitor track listing (Note: the anniversary edition includes the same tracklist, however all songs are remastered.)
No.	Title	Length
1.	"Ultravisitor"	8:32
2.	"I Fulcrum"	3:31
3.	"Iambic 9 Poetry"	6:55
4.	"Andrei"	2:00
5.	"50 Cycles"	8:33
6.	"Menelec"	5:43
7.	"C-Town Smash"	1:29
8.	"Steinbolt"	7:44
9.	"An Arched Pathway"	4:06
10.	"Telluric Piece"	1:53
11.	"District Line II"	8:33
12.	"Circlewave"	6:28
13.	"Tetra-Sync"	9:27
14.	"Tommib Help Buss"	2:10
15.	"Every Day I Love"	2:39
Total length:		79:41
