= Square Window =

EP by Squarepusher
- Released: March 8, 2004
- Genre: Drill n bass
- Length: 19:00
- Label: Warp Records
- Producer: Tom Jenkinson

Squarepusher chronology
Do You Know Squarepusher (2002)	Square Window (2004)	Venus No. 17 (2004)

Square Window is a promotional 3" CD EP by Squarepusher, distributed only with pre-orders of Ultravisitor from Warp Records' online store. The five songs on this EP were also included on the second disc of the Japanese version of Ultravisitor.

== Track listing ==
1. "Square Window" – 5:01
2. "Abacus 2" – 5:13
3. "Venus No. 17" – 6:44
4. "Itti-Fack" – 0:44
5. "Melt 14.6" – 1:16
