= Nux vomica (disambiguation) =

Nux vomica is part of the binomial nomenclature for the plant species Strychnos nux-vomica.

Nux Vomica may also refer to:

- Nux Vomica, an album by the Veils
- "Nux Vomica", a song by Squarepusher (credited as the Duke of Harringay) on the album Alroy Road Tracks
