= Big Loada =

EP by Squarepusher
- Released: 21 July 1997
- Recorded: 1996–1997
- Genre: Drill 'n' bass; IDM; jungle
- Length: 28:47
- Label: Warp
- Producer: Tom Jenkinson

Squarepusher chronology
Hard Normal Daddy (1997)	Big Loada (1997)	Burningn'n Tree (1997)

Big Loada is an EP by English electronic musician Squarepusher. It was released on 21 July 1997 by Warp in the United Kingdom. It was later released, with an expanded track listing, on 13 October 1998 by Nothing Records in the United States.

== Release ==
Big Loada served as Squarepusher's fourth release on Warp in the United Kingdom, following the Port Rhombus EP, the "Vic Acid" single, and the album Hard Normal Daddy.

The Nothing Records issue of Big Loada has a rearranged track listing with additional tracks unavailable in the United States at the time. Warp had not opened their American division yet, and arranged to release some of their material through Nothing. The rearrangement of the tracks is to highlight the "Come On My Selector" video, directed by Chris Cunningham, and which was included on the re-release. Tracks 8, 9 and 10 make up the full Port Rhombus EP, Jenkinson's first release on Warp. Tracks 11 and 12 are two B-sides to the "Vic Acid" single (although the G7000 mix of "Fat Controller" was not included on this release). This edition has modified cover artwork, as the prominent Warp Records logo had to be removed.

Some Nothing Records versions of Big Loada are actually copies of Budakhan Mindphone that have been incorrectly packaged and labelled.

== Reception ==
Professional ratings
Review scores
Source	Rating
AllMusic	4/5 stars
NME	7/10
The Rolling Stone Album Guide	4/5 stars
Select	3/5
Uncut	4/5 stars

In 2017, Pitchfork placed Big Loada at number 9 on its list of "The 50 Best IDM Albums of All Time".

== Track listing ==
=== Warp edition ===
No.	Title	Length
1.	"A Journey to Reedham (7.AM Mix)"	6:35
2.	"Full Rinse (Featuring MC Twin Tub)"	2:23
3.	"Massif (Stay Strong)"	6:26
4.	"Come On My Selector"	3:24
5.	"The Body Builder (Dressing Gown Mix)"	3:02
6.	"Tequila Fish"	6:09
7.	"Jacques Mal Chance (Il N'a Pas De Chance)"	0:48
Total length:		28:47

=== Nothing edition ===
No.	Title	Length
1.	"Come On My Selector"	3:24
2.	"A Journey to Reedham (7.AM Mix)"	6:35
3.	"Full Rinse (Featuring MC Twin Tub)"	2:23
4.	"Massif (Stay Strong)"	6:26
5.	"The Body Builder (Dressing Gown Mix)"	3:02
6.	"Tequila Fish"	6:09
7.	"Jacques Mal Chance (Il N'a Pas De Chance)"	0:48
8.	"Port Rhombus"	6:41
9.	"Problem Child"	5:43
10.	"Significant Others"	3:28
11.	"Lone Ravers (Live in Chelmsford Mix)"	5:01
12.	"The Barn (303 Kebab Mix)"	2:11
Total length:		51:51

Bonus enhanced content
No.	Title	Length
13.	"Come On My Selector" (music video)	7:24
Total length:		59:15

== Charts ==
Chart (1997)	Peak position
UK Singles (Official Charts Company)	134
