= Plug Me In (disambiguation) =

Plug Me In is a 2007 box set by rock band AC/DC.

Plug Me In may also refer to:

- Plug Me In (album), a 1968 album by Eddie Harris
- "Plug Me In", a song by George Harrison from the bonus disc Apple Jam, released with his 1970 album All Things Must Pass
- "Plug Me In", a song by Shobaleader One (led by Squarepusher) from the 2010 album Shobaleader One: d'Demonstrator
- "Plug Me In", a song by lil soda boi from their 2018 album "Eco"
