= Music for Robots =

Music for Robots may refer to:

- Music for Robots (website) indie music blog
- Music for Robots, 1961 LP by Frank Coe and Forrest J Ackerman
- Music for Robots (EP), a 2014 EP by Squarepusher
