= Dostrotime =

Studio album by Squarepusher
- Released: 1 March 2024
- Genre: IDM; drum and bass; experimental; jazz
- Length: 59:14 (Standard); 60:28 (Japanese version)
- Label: Warp
- Producer: Tom Jenkinson

Squarepusher chronology
| Be Up a Hello (2020) | Dostrotime (2024) | Kammerkonzert (2026) |

Singles from Dostrotime
- 1. "Wendorlan" Released: 22 February 2024

Dostrotime is the sixteenth studio album by British electronic musician Tom Jenkinson, under the alias of Squarepusher. It was released through Warp Records on 1 March 2024. According to Jenkinson, Dostrotime was inspired by the "novel, eerie, sublime silence" of the COVID-19 lockdown. The album was released on physical formats (CD and LP) as well as digital distribution platforms such as Bandcamp and Bleep. Its release was delayed on platforms such as Spotify and Apple Music until later in 2024. A single for the album, "Wendorlan", was released on 23 January 2024, coupled with a music video using an oscilloscope.

== Background ==
On 21 January 2024, subscribers to Squarepusher's email newsletter received a download for a wav file, titled "XY.wav". When this file was placed into an oscilloscope and the signal properly plotted, the word "Dostrotime" was revealed. On 23 January 2024, the music video for the lead single "Wendorlan" was released on YouTube. The visuals for the music video were made by Jenkinson himself, using an oscilloscope. It was filmed in one take and, according to Jenkinson, he used "custom processing to generate the XY signal from components of track audio and control data". "Wendorlan" was released onto streaming services on 22 February 2024, with both a "Slamstep Remix" and a "XY Code S1575F7.VS050" version, which contained the same audio as "XY.wav".

Jenkinson revealed that the album was majorly inspired by the COVID-19 lockdown, saying "For me, the lockdown of 2020 will always stand out as a remarkable time partly for the viscerality of its terrors, but also because of its novel, eerie, sublime silence. It afforded me (and no doubt other fortunate loners) a respite from the incessant distractions that can get in the way of important things such as doing nothing – or recording music."

Jenkinson also revealed the title of the album itself was inspired by the lockdowns:

The cancellation of all live commitments meant the prospect of a year's worth of itineraries, airport security, hotels and no sleep was erased, and for some time I experienced a simple happiness not familiar in my adulthood.

In a way it reminded me of being a child, where one knows big and awful stuff happens on the horizon but the current moment is a blissful sanctuary. Without customary interruptions, time elapsed differently: Dostrotime.

== Release ==
Dostrotime was released on 1 March 2024 on CD, 2xLP and digitally through Bleep and Bandcamp. The album was not initially released on streaming services such as Spotify or Apple Music; Warp Records made a statement saying that "the album will not be available on streaming services initially, but is available on LP, CD and digitally via our store and good shops worldwide." The album was eventually released on streaming services on 5 July 2024.

== Reception ==
Professional ratings
Review scores
| Source | Rating |
|---|---|
| AllMusic | 4/5 stars |
| Sputnikmusic | 4/5 |

Dostrotime has been described as IDM, drum and bass, experimental, and jazz. Overall, the album was received positively by critics. Paul Simpson of AllMusic gave the album a good review, stating that "As a whole, Dostrotime is easily one of the most well-rounded Squarepusher albums, displaying his range as an artist while housing some of his nuttiest tracks." John Doran of The Quietus also gave a good review, saying "The album is a pleasingly symmetrical trip through What Squarepusher Solo Can Do In 2024, and, to me at least, it feels like a palate-cleanser [...]" Mark Nelson of Sputnikmusic called the album "his best body of work in two decades". Pseudonymous author "Benci" of Igloo Magazine said that Dostrotime "strikes with bold tracks that are not afraid to go all in, whether that'd be with their explosiveness, intricate live playing, or insane drum spasms". Jordan Darville of The Fader also said that "All in all, Dostrotime is pure Squarepusher: even in its familiar moments, you could never really predict it."

=== Year-end lists ===
Select year-end rankings for Dostrotime
| Publication/critic | Accolade | Rank | Ref. |
|---|---|---|---|
| Bleep | Top 10 Albums of 2024 | 1 | |

== Track listing ==
All tracks written and produced by Tom Jenkinson.

Dostrotime track listing
| No. | Title | Length |
|---|---|---|
| 1. | "Arkteon 1" | 3:00 |
| 2. | "Enbounce" | 6:30 |
| 3. | "Wendorlan" (Original Mix) | 6:19 |
| 4. | "Duneray" | 6:29 |
| 5. | "Kronmec" | 4:37 |
| 6. | "Arkteon 2" | 2:33 |
| 7. | "Holorform" | 4:44 |
| 8. | "Akkranen" | 5:29 |
| 9. | "Stromcor" | 5:01 |
| 10. | "Domelash" | 6:18 |
| 11. | "Heliobat" | 3:47 |
| 12. | "Arkteon 3" | 4:21 |
| Total length: | | 59:14 |

Japanese bonus track
| No. | Title | Length |
|---|---|---|
| 1. | "Heliobat" (Tokyo Nightfall) | 1:14 |
| Total length: | | 60:28 |
