= Eventration =

Eventration is the protrusion of contents of the abdomen through a defect or weakness in the abdominal wall. This can refer to:

- Diaphragmatic eventration
- Herniation
- Evisceration (disambiguation)
