= Hello Everything =

Studio album by Squarepusher
- Released: 16 October 2006
- Genre: IDM
- Length: 60:04
- Label: Warp
- Producer: Tom Jenkinson

Squarepusher chronology
Venus No. 17 (2004)	Hello Everything (2006)	Just a Souvenir (2008)

Professional ratings
Aggregate scores
Source	Rating
Metacritic	64/100
Review scores
Source	Rating
The Guardian	4/5 stars
The Independent	3/5 stars
PopMatters	(8/10)
Tiny Mix Tapes	2/5 stars
URB	2.5/5 stars
Pitchfork Media	(7.5/10)

Hello Everything is the eighth album by Squarepusher, released on 16 October 2006 on Warp. Prior to its release, three downloadable singles were made available from Bleep (Warp's download store) — "Welcome to Europe", "Hanningfield Window" and "Exciton"; the last two are exclusive to the Japanese version of the album. All three tracks were released on the 12" vinyl single Welcome to Europe. Limited editions of the album included a bonus 3" CD, Vacuum Tracks. This bonus material consists of five drone tracks similar to the track "Vacuum Garden".

The song "Hello Meow" is used for Adult Swim's "Next Sunday on [adult swim]" bumpers, and "Welcome to Europe" has been used in commercials for the network's evening lineup.

The song "Planetarium" is used as the music intro for the French video game show "Chez Marcus" on channel Nolife, and in the video game LittleBigPlanet 2.

== Track listing ==
No.	Title	Length
1.	"Hello Meow"	4:31
2.	"Theme from Sprite"	2:57
3.	"Bubble Life"	2:53
4.	"Planetarium"	6:09
5.	"Vacuum Garden"	6:02
6.	"Circlewave 2"	3:53
7.	"Cronecker King"	0:48
8.	"Rotate Electrolyte"	7:48
9.	"Welcome to Europe"	4:32
10.	"Plotinus"	7:36
11.	"The Modern Bass Guitar"	5:38
12.	"Orient Orange"	10:54

=== Vacuum Tracks ===
No.	Title	Length
1.	"4026 Melt 1"	3:10
2.	"4026 Melt 3"	3:07
3.	"4026 Melt 4"	3:25
4.	"4026 Melt 5"	4:31
5.	"4026 Melt 6"	5:19
