= Maximum Priest E.P. =

EP by Squarepusher
- Released: 16 July 1999
- Length: 28:26
- Label: Warp
- Producer: Tom Jenkinson

Squarepusher chronology
Budakhan Mindphone (1999)	Maximum Priest E.P. (1999)	Selection Sixteen (1999)

Maximum Priest E.P. is a 1999 EP by Squarepusher, released on Warp Records. It features remixes by Autechre and Luke Vibert. According to the back of the packaging for physical releases, the cover art is a still taken from the movie “Holding Hands With Lipman 3”.

== Track listing ==
1. "Song: Our Underwater Torch" – 6:23
2. "Decathlon Oxide" – 4:05
3. "You're Going Down" – 3:35
4. "Cranium Oxide" – 0:32
5. "Two Bass Hit" (ae Mix) – 4:01
6. "Circular Flexing" (Yee-King Mix) – 5:36
7. "Shin Triad" (Wagonchrist Mix) – 4:15
