= Yoichiro Kawaguchi =

Japanese artist

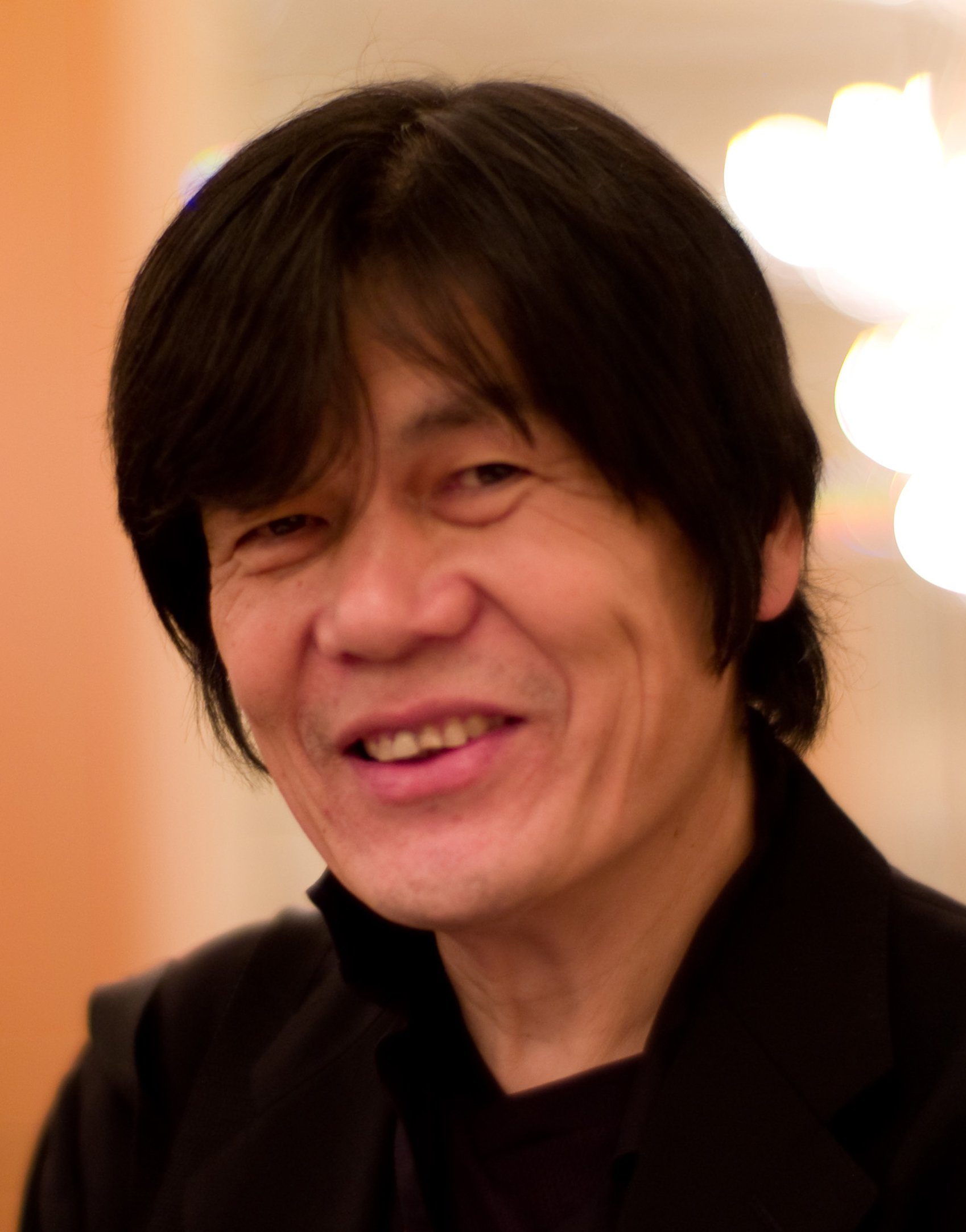
Yoichiro Kawaguchi

Yoichiro Kawaguchi (河口 洋一郎, Kawaguchi Yoichirō; born 1952 in Tanegashima, Kagoshima) is a Japanese computer graphics artist and professor emeritus at the University of Tokyo.

== Career ==
Kawaguchi rose to international prominence in 1982 when he presented "Growth Model" in the international conference SIGGRAPH.

In 2013, Kawaguchi designed Cosmo, a robot that performs keyboards with a laser. Cosmo was designed to be one of the members of Squarepusher's virtual band Z-Machines, which was created to promote the alcoholic beverage ZIMA. They performed their debut piece on 24 June 2013 in Tokyo, Japan.

On March 31, 2018, he retired from his post as a professor at the University of Tokyo and received the title of professor emeritus. In the same year he was appointed president of the Digital Content Association of Japan.

== Honours ==
- Medal with Purple Ribbon (2013)
- Person of Cultural Merit (2023)
