= Evisceration =

Evisceration (pronunciation: /ɪvɪsəˈreɪʃən/) is disembowelment, i.e., the removal of viscera (internal organs, especially those in the abdominal cavity). The term may also refer to:

- Evisceration (autotomy), ejection of viscera as a defensive action by an animal
- Evisceration (ophthalmology), removing the internal material from the eye
- Evisceration Plague, an album by American death metal band Cannibal Corpse, or a song on the album
- Pelvic evisceration (or pelvic exenteration), a radical surgical treatment that removes all organs from a person's pelvic cavity
- "Eviscerate" and "Eviscerate (Version)", two songs by Squarepusher both from the album Conumber E:P
