= Do You Know Squarepusher (song) =

Single by Squarepusher

from the album Do You Know Squarepusher
- Released: 10 December 2001
- Genre: Intelligent dance music
- Length: 4:55
- Label: Warp Records WAP 155
- Songwriter(s): Tom Jenkinson

Squarepusher singles chronology
"My Red Hot Car" (2001)	"Do You Know Squarepusher" (2001)

"Do You Know Squarepusher" is a track by Squarepusher from the 2002 album Do You Know Squarepusher. The track was originally released as an untitled single in 2001. The only writing that appears on the release is "Squarepusher"; however, the only song which appears on the release is the track later renamed "Do You Know Squarepusher". The single is a 12" vinyl and is a single-sided pressing.

The single was selected as NME's "Single of the Week" in its week of release. It also received a very positive review at Drowned in Sound, where it received a 10/10 rating.

== Track listing ==
Side A

1. "Do You Know Squarepusher" – 4:55

Side B

- Side B is intentionally left blank
