= Selection Sixteen =

Studio album by Squarepusher
- Released: 8 November 1999
- Genre: Drum and bass, acid techno
- Length: 46:30
- Label: Warp
- Producer: Tom Jenkinson

Squarepusher chronology
Maximum Priest E.P. (1999)	Selection Sixteen (1999)	Go Plastic (2001)

Professional ratings
Review scores
Source	Rating
Allmusic	4/5 stars

Selection Sixteen is the fourth studio album by English electronic musician Squarepusher, released on 8 November 1999 by Warp. According to the CD, the cover art is from a film called Acid Trayners 4, which seems to be different pictures of an oscilloscope. Throughout the album, the bass, hooked to an audio/midi converter, plays an important part in the composition of synth and drum parts.

== Track listing ==
No.	Title	Length
1.	"The 'Eye"	2:17
2.	"Square Rave"	3:01
3.	"Time Borb"	1:03
4.	"Dedicated Loop"	3:47
5.	"Tomorrow World"	4:56
6.	"Cool Veil"	0:32
7.	"Schizm Track #1"	5:07
8.	"Freeway"	1:37
9.	"Snake Pass"	3:30
10.	"Yo"	0:28
11.	"Mind Rubbers"	4:05
12.	"Tesko"	0:20
13.	"Acid Tape Track"	3:53

== "Anti-Greylord Protection Scheme Prelude" ==
Most releases of Selection Sixteen include "Anti-Greylord Protection Scheme Prelude", which was originally released as a separate EP with a slightly different track order. "Ceephax Mix" was created by Squarepusher's brother, Andy Jenkinson, a.k.a. Ceephax Acid Crew.

On the original release, "Schizm Track #2 Mix" is the first track.

1. "8 Bit Mix #1" – 1:04
2. "8 Bit Mix #2" – 0:55
3. "Schizm Track #2 Mix" – 3:45
4. "Ceephax Mix" (remixed by Andy Jenkinson) – 6:02
