= Squarepusher Plays... =

EP by Squarepusher
- Released: 1996
- Label: Rephlex DOG 037 EP

Squarepusher chronology
Feed Me Weird Things (1996)	Squarepusher Plays... (1996)	Port Rhombus EP (1996)

Squarepusher Plays... is a 12" vinyl record release by Squarepusher. "Squarepusher Theme" was originally released on Feed Me Weird Things via Rephlex Records and the other two tracks were released on the Japanese import and 25th anniversary edition of Feed Me Weird Things as bonus tracks.

An etching in the runout groove on side B reads "I cannot be arsed with toilet humour".

== Track listing ==
Side A

1. "Squarepusher Theme" – 6:20

Side B

1. "Theme From Goodbye Renaldo" – 6:02
2. "Deep Fried Pizza" – 3:50
