= Yamaha FS1R =

Sound synthesizer module

FS1R
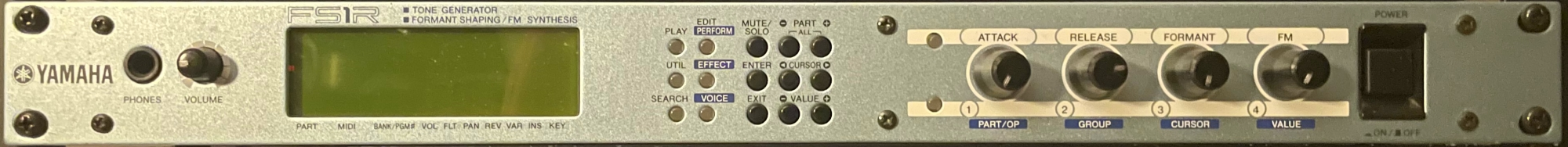
- Yamaha FS1R
- Manufacturer: Yamaha
- Dates: 1998 - 2000
- Price: £699 GBP

Technical specifications
- Polyphony: 32 voices
- Timbrality: 4
- Oscillator: 16 (8 pitched, 8 unpitched), each with: attenuation envelope; frequency envelope One common pitch envelope
- LFO: 2
- Synthesis type: Digital Frequency modulation; Formant synthesis; Subtractive synthesis
- Filter: Resonant multimode filter with envelope generator
- Aftertouch expression: Yes
- Velocity expression: Yes
- Storage memory: 1408 factory voices; 128 user voices; 384 factory performances; 128 user performances
- Effects: 1 insert, 2 send

Input/output
- Keyboard: none
- External control: MIDI

FS1R audio demonstration
A sequence showing the combined FM synthesis and formant parameters in a single patch, along with the FS1R's onboard delay and reverb.

The Yamaha FS1R is a sound synthesizer module, manufactured by the Yamaha Corporation from 1998 to 2000. Based on Formant synthesis, it also has FM synthesis capabilities similar to the DX range. Its editing involves 2,000+ parameters in any one 'performance', prompting the creation of a number of third party freeware programming applications. These applications provide the tools needed to program the synth which were missing when it was in production by Yamaha. The synth was discontinued after two years, probably in part due to its complexity (particularly the formant sequencing), poor front-panel controls, brief manual and limited polyphony.

The FS1R synthesizer has a new set of wave forms over the earlier DX line of FM synthesizers, which have since been incorporated into the new Montage line from Yamaha (with the exception of the Formant wave form). These wave forms include Sine, All1, All2, Odd1, Odd2, Res1, Res2, and Formant. The new wave forms are each constructed with a large number of inherent harmonics making FM synthesis far more efficient. Each one of these operator wave forms can replace an entire column of operators in a Yamaha DX7 synthesizer algorithm.

Formants are mainly associated with modeling the human voice, but have other uses as well. Formants are present in all instruments that use a resonating body, like the violin, viola, cello, bass viol, bassoon, saxophone, English horn, clarinet, oboe, acoustic guitar, etc. The fixed body of the instrument acts like a set of fixed frequency band pass filters, which is what a formant is. The resonating body instrument was previously very difficult to model using the DX7 family of FM synthesizers, and lacked authentic real instrument patches. FS1R's formant wave form capabilities allows users to access more realistic sounds absent from other models at the time. This capability is largely unknown due to the path synthesizer development has taken, the sample-based synthesizers has bypassed the need for combining formant synthesis with FM.

Sample-based synths limit the user to a set of preset instrument patches, the user can't create their own instrument from scratch to create a custom new sound. The FM style of synthesizer has this capability and is drawing a new set of users to the older technology. The new FM-X synth engine in the Yamaha Montage is based on features from the FS1R.

== Formant sequencing ==
The FS1R uses the "formant sequence," this being a series (128 or 512) of "frames" that define the level and frequency of each of up to eight 'voiced' (pitched) and eight 'unvoiced' (un-pitched) formant generators over time. The number of frames limits the typical length of a sequence to a few seconds, though this length and pitch can be varied in real-time with few or no artifacts. Applying a formant sequence to a sound allows a complex, evolving sound to be programmed in a relatively short time. 90 formant sequences were supplied with the FS1R.

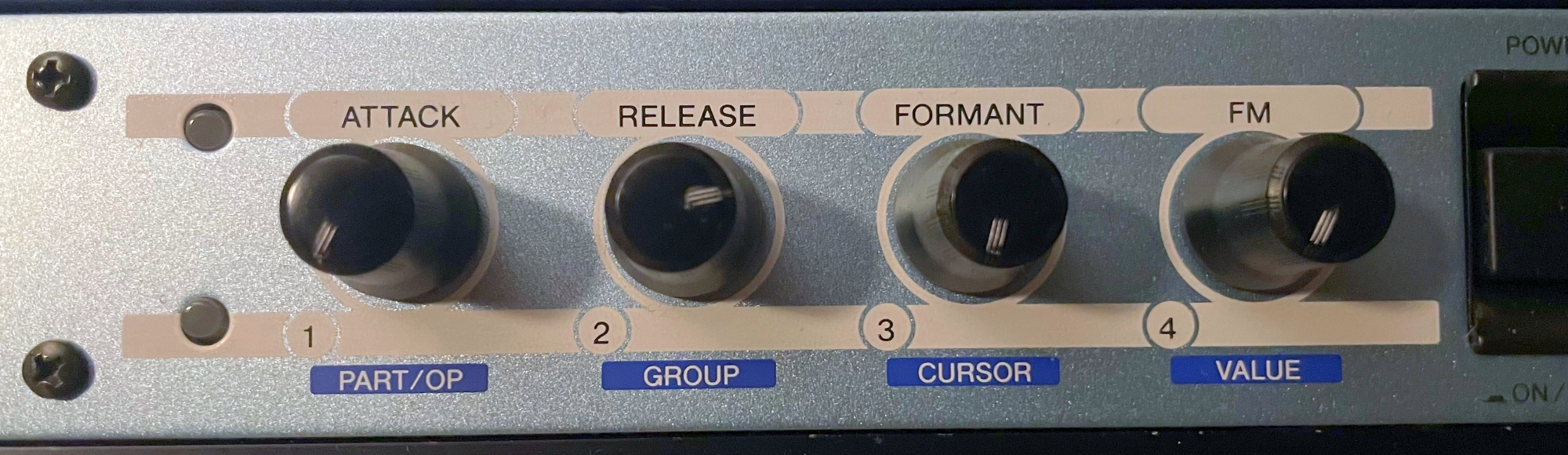
The 'formant' controls exclusive to the FS1R unlike other FM synthesizers.

Yamaha FS1R Front Panel Yamaha FS1R Control Screen Sakura Free FS1R Editor

== Problems and shortcomings ==
A 4-part synth with 32 voices was viewed as inadequate by 1998's standards [subjective] although the FS1R was designed not as an all-in-one workstation for producing entire songs but as a way to add original, complex tones that could not be produced by other synthesis methods.

Software developed by Yamaha to convert samples to formant sequences was well known but never released for general use. Eventually, a programmer (Wouter van Nifterick, see FS1R utilities below) produced a freeware alternative and users could finally access all the unit's power a number of years after its initial release. Since this time additional fseq editors have popped up, but all of them suffer from the same problem as the original Yamaha editor. The sounds they produce are very gravelly and barely resemble the sound of the original sample.

Rumours abounded of an 'FS2R' successor, with a USB port to connect to a Windows PC/Macintosh equipped with suitable editing software, but no such machine was forthcoming. The formant wave forms in the synth are unable to accurately mimic human speech, which may have been one of the original goals of the synthesizer's development.

In late September 2026, FSVR was released, a VST/AudioUnit plugin equivalent to the FS1R, for free.

== Notable users ==
- Aphex Twin
- Autechre
- Boris Blank
- Covenant
- Enigma
- Plaid
- Squarepusher
- .snd
