= Shobaleader One: d'Demonstrator =

2010 studio album by Shobaleader One

Studio album by Shobaleader One
- Released: 18 October 2010
- Genre: Electronic; electronic rock; R&B; electro; funk; IDM
- Length: 44:39
- Label: Warp

Shobaleader One chronology
Shobaleader One: d'Demonstrator (2010)	Elektrac (2017)

Squarepusher chronology
Solo Electric Bass 1 (2009)	Shobaleader One: d'Demonstrator (2010)	Ufabulum (2012)

Shobaleader One: d'Demonstrator (or simply d'Demonstrator) is the first studio album by Shobaleader One, a five-member band founded by Squarepusher. The album was released on 18 October 2010 through Warp Records. The album followed their first release, a single titled "Cryptic Motion". The album takes inspiration from various genres, such as electronic, rock, and R&B. It received mixed reviews from critics, from magazines like Pitchfork and Drowned in Sound; some critics said it was accessible, and some found it disappointing. The album peaked at number 36 in the UK Dance Charts.

== Background ==
Squarepusher's previous studio album, Just a Souvenir (2008), was a recreation of one of his dreams where he sees a concert of a band in front of a huge, glowing clothes hanger, which would inspire the creation of Shobaleader One. The Shobaleader One members Strobe Nazard, Sten t'Mech, Arg Nution, and Company Laser mailed Squarepusher about forming a band. After being "impressed by their perseverance", Squarepusher met with the members of the band, and formed Shobaleader One. The members of the band, except Squarepusher, had backgrounds in metal and R&B. Some critics have questioned if Shobaleader One is an actual band, rather than an alias of Squarepusher. BBC Music attributed the doubt with Squarepusher's "refusal to name names". The first release of the band was "Cryptic Motion", a single released on 30 August 2010 under Ed Banger Records.

== Composition ==
Shobaleader One: d'Demonstrator has been described as electronic, electronic rock, R&B, electro, funk, and IDM. According to AllMusic, it is a concept album. Most tracks on the album have vocals, which are under a vocoder, and a midtempo beat. The opener, "Plug Me In" has been described as slow jam and techno, composed with snares, acoustic guitars, and a jazz-like cadence and melody. "Laser Rock" has a lick that has been bitcrushed, accompanied with synthesizers. "Megazine" takes inspiration from synthpop, and includes distorted bass and drum machines.

== Reception and release ==
Professional ratings
Aggregate scores
Source	Rating
Metacritic	60/100
Review scores
Source	Rating
AllMusic	3/5 stars
Drowned in Sound	8/10
The Independent	2/5 stars
MusicOMH	3.5/5 stars
Pitchfork	4/10
PopMatters	3/10

After being released on 18 October 2010 through Warp, the album received mixed reviews. According to the review aggregator Metacritic, Shobaleader One: d'Demonstrator received "mixed or average reviews" based on a weighted average score of 60 out of 100 from 10 critic scores. AllMusic writer John Bush said that "the album will have listeners thinking of Daft Punk one minute and stark '80s television themes the next", and talked about the similarities of Shobaleader One to Daft Punk, an electronic music duo. Writer Alex Denney for BBC Music said it "[e]motionally [is] a bit blank", though "certainly has its endearingly eccentric moments". William Grant for Drowned in Sound said that it "[strikes] a finer balance between the accessible and the surreal than pretty much all of [Squarepusher]'s previous releases". The Independent writer Andy Gill said that "[i]t starts out okay", but "[reached] an unbearable Gothick cacophony" near the album's end. Ben Hogwood for MusicOMH said that it "adds up to a qualified success", though "there is an awful lot to take in". Pitchfork writer Jess Harvell negatively criticised the album, and said that "Shobaleader One just sounds lifeless. There's little thrilling, or perverse, about it". Jason Cook for PopMatters said that it "isn't fundamentally bad. There are playful bass lines, its never-ending vocal pieces sung through some vocoder and harominzed [sic], replete with the least interesting aesthetics that Daft Punk have wondrously given us thus far", and felt disappointed with the album.

== Track listing ==
All tracks are written by Shobaleader One.

Shobaleader One: d'Demonstrator track listing
No.	Title	Length
1.	"Plug Me In"	4:49
2.	"Laser Rock"	4:43
3.	"Into the Blue"	4:46
4.	"Frisco Wave"	3:45
5.	"Megazine"	4:34
6.	"Abstract Lover"	3:46
7.	"Endless Night"	5:05
8.	"Cryptic Motion"	6:13
9.	"Maximum Planck"	6:58
Total length:		44:39

== Personnel ==
Credits adapted from AllMusic.

- Arg Nution – guitar
- Company Laser – drums
- Donald Milne – photography
- Sam Blunden – art direction, design
- Squarepusher – bass, vocals, composer, director, producer
- Sten t'Mech – guitar
- Strobe Nazard – keyboards

== Charts ==
Chart performance for Shobaleader One: d'Demonstrator
Chart (2010)	Peak position
UK Dance Albums (OCC)	36
