= Port Rhombus (EP) =

Port Rhombus EP

EP by Squarepusher
- Released: 1 July 1996
- Length: 15:58
- Label: Warp
- Producer: Tom Jenkinson

Squarepusher chronology
Squarepusher Plays... (1996)	Port Rhombus EP (1996)	Hard Normal Daddy (1997)

Port Rhombus EP is a 1996 EP by Squarepusher. It was the first Squarepusher release on Warp Records. There is also a promo version, with identical tracks, but dated 1994. Also compiled in the US version of Big Loada on Nothing Records.

== Track listing ==
1. "Port Rhombus" – 6:49
2. "Problem Child" – 5:43
3. "Significant Others" – 3:28
