= Elektrac =

Live album by Shobaleader One
- Released: 10 March 2017
- Length: 65:40
- Label: Warp
- Producer: Tom Jenkinson

Shobaleader One chronology
Shobaleader One: d'Demonstrator (2010)	Elektrac (2017)

Squarepusher chronology
Damogen Furies (2015)	Elektrac (2017)	All Night Chroma (2019)

Professional ratings
Aggregate scores
Source	Rating
Metacritic	71/100
Review scores
Source	Rating
AllMusic	4/5 stars
Exclaim!	8/10
The Line of Best Fit	8/10
The Music	3.5/5 stars
Pitchfork	5.7/10
PopMatters	8/10 stars
Spectrum Culture	3.25/5 stars

Elektrac is a live album by British electronic musician Squarepusher's live group Shobaleader One. It was released on 10 March 2017 on Warp Records.

== Track listing ==
All tracks are written by Tom Jenkinson.

Elektrac
No.	Title	Length
1.	"The Swifty"	5:30
2.	"Coopers World"	5:29
3.	"Don't Go Plastic"	7:14
4.	"Iambic 5 Poetry"	5:37
5.	"Squarepusher Theme"	6:14
6.	"E8 Boogie"	6:56
7.	"Deep Fried Pizza"	7:10
8.	"Megazine"	4:32
9.	"Delta-V"	4:04
10.	"Anstromm Feck 4"	5:09
11.	"Journey to Reedham"	6:55
Total length:		65:40

== Charts ==
Chart (2017)	Peak position
US Dance/Electronic Album Sales (Billboard)	13
