= Solo Electric Bass 1 =

Live album by Squarepusher
- Released: 17 August 2009
- Recorded: September 2007
- Genre: Jazz
- Length: 39:27
- Label: Warp
- Producer: Tom Jenkinson

Squarepusher chronology
Numbers Lucent (2009)	Solo Electric Bass 1 (2009)	Shobaleader One: d'Demonstrator (2010)

Professional ratings
Aggregate scores
Source	Rating
Metacritic	58/100
Review scores
Source	Rating
BBC	average
Culturedeluxe	7/10
Drowned in Sound	4/10
Pitchfork	5.6/10

Solo Electric Bass 1 is a live album by Squarepusher. The album consists of twelve tracks recorded from Squarepusher's September 2007 live performance at Cité de la Musique in Paris, France, as part of the Jazz à la Villette 2007 festival. In contrast to Squarepusher's multi-instrumental performances, the tracks on Solo Electric Bass 1 were performed using only a 6-string electric extended-range bass guitar and amplifier. The release is limited to 850 copies worldwide.

== Track listing ==
Solo Electric Bass 1 track listing
No.	Title	Length
1.	"seb-1.01"	2:38
2.	"seb-1.09"	3:32
3.	"seb-1.10"	2:00
4.	"seb-1.04"	1:50
5.	"seb-1.06"	3:35
6.	"seb-1.02"	1:58
7.	"seb-1.03"	5:00
8.	"seb-1.05"	4:41
9.	"seb-1.07"	1:54
10.	"seb-1.08"	5:21
11.	"seb-1.11"	1:31
12.	"seb-1.12"	5:27
