= Buzz Caner =

Studio album by Chaos A.D.
- Released: 1998 May 25
- Genre: Acid techno
- Length: 70:47
- Label: Rephlex

Chaos A.D. chronology
| Burningn'n Tree (1997) | Buzz Caner (1998) | Remixes 12" (1998) |

Professional ratings
Review scores
| Source | Rating |
|---|---|
| AllMusic | 4/5 stars |

Buzz Caner is an album by Chaos A.D., an alias of Squarepusher (Tom Jenkinson). Instead of Squarepusher's unusual drum and bass sound, this album uses a more techno-based acid house sound.

== Track listing ==
=== CD ===
| No. | Title | Length |
|---|---|---|
| 1. | "Thin Life" | 5:20 |
| 2. | "Mess Head" | 7:06 |
| 3. | "Bioslate" | 6:35 |
| 4. | "Generation Shit" | 3:10 |
| 5. | "Dreaded Pestilence" | 6:22 |
| 6. | "Mind War Electro" | 9:00 |
| 7. | "Friend Track" | 3:54 |
| 8. | "Psultan Part 1" | 5:17 |
| 9. | "Theme From Cumberland Wrestling" | 4:39 |
| 10. | "Male Pill Part 6" | 6:51 |
| 11. | "Up the Gary" | 6:21 |
| 12. | "Davey's Safety Lamp" | 6:12 |

=== 3×12" vinyl ===
Side A
| No. | Title | Length |
|---|---|---|
| 1. | "Thin Life" |
| 2. | "Messhead" |

Side B
| No. | Title | Length |
|---|---|---|
| 3. | "Bioslate" |
| 4. | "Generation Shit" |

Side C
| No. | Title | Length |
|---|---|---|
| 5. | "Dreaded Pestilence" |
| 6. | "Mind War Electro" |

Side D
| No. | Title | Length |
|---|---|---|
| 7. | "Friend Track" |
| 8. | "Psultan Part 1" |

Side E
| No. | Title | Length |
|---|---|---|
| 9. | "Theme From CUmberland Wrestling" |
| 10. | "Male Pill Part 6" |

Side F
| No. | Title | Length |
|---|---|---|
| 11. | "Up the Gary" |
| 12. | "Davey's Safety Lamp" |
