= Tried by 12 =

Single by East Flatbush Project

from the album First Born (Overdue)
- Released: 1996
- Genre: Hip-hop
- Length: 2:58
- Label: 10/30 Uproar
- Songwriter(s): R. Smith; S. Bellamy
- Producer(s): Spencer Bellamy

East Flatbush Project singles chronology
"A Madman's Dream" / "Can't Hold It Back" (1994)	"Tried by 12" (1996)	"Everything We Spit Is Hard" (2000)

"Tried by 12" is a single by American record producer Spencer Bellamy under the pseudonym East Flatbush Project, featuring American rapper Des. It was released in 1996 through 10/30 Uproar Records. Tried by 12 (Remixes), an EP featuring remix versions of the song, was released in 1998 through Chocolate Industries and Ninja Tune. It is Bellamy's most successful song to date.

== Release ==
The single was originally released in 1996 through 10/30 Uproar Records. Marvin "Seven" Bedard, who is the co-founder of Chocolate Industries, heard the song and decided to get it remixed. He then got in touch with East Flatbush Project's Spencer Bellamy. The song was remixed by Autechre, Bisk, Freeform, Funkstörung, The Herbaliser, Ko-Wreck Technique, Nick Fury, Phoenecia, Sluta Leta, Squarepusher, and Trapazoid (Richard Devine). Kevin Foakes played Autechre's remix to Ninja Tune, and the label licensed the release for a wider market. The remix EP was released in 1998 through Chocolate Industries and Ninja Tune, with the artwork designed by The Designers Republic.

The song was later included on East Flatbush Project's album, First Born (Overdue) (2009).

== Critical reception ==
According to Rob Theakston of AllMusic, the single "took the hip-hop community by storm, as well as the electronic world." Jack Erwin of Complex stated, "there is an underlying truth to the lyrics of the original 'Tried by 12' that bluntly describes both the violence that continues to permeate America and the role of rap music as a mirror to reflect our own worst instincts." Nate Patrin of Stereogum commented that "Des, née Ron Smith, is the rapper who made the titular refrain 'I'd rather be tried by 12 than carried by six' feel so central to the '90s-and-onward American street-justice vernacular." In a review of the remix EP, Tim Haslett of CMJ New Music Monthly stated, "What distinguishes this effort from the plethora of remix work is that on first hearing, some of the reinterpretations bear absolutely no resemblance whatever to the original, but that impression is deceptive because they all retain the parched groove and moody, contemplative textures of the original version." He added, "This is where experimental electronics and hip-hop meet in a way that will change the received wisdom about each form."

=== Accolades ===
Accolades for "Tried by 12"
Publication	Year	List	Rank	Ref.
Complex	2015	The 100 Greatest Hip-Hop Beats of All Time	89	
Complex	2015	The 100 Best New York City Rap Songs	84	
Complex	2016	The Best Rap Songs of 1996	29	
Fact	2015	The 100 Best Indie Hip-Hop Records of All Time	7	
Stereogum	2020	20 Essential Late '90s Underground Rap Songs	—	

== Legacy ==
At the 2011 BET Hip Hop Awards, Eminem and his Shady Records signees Slaughterhouse (Joe Budden, Crooked I, Joell Ortiz, and Royce da 5'9") and Yelawolf rapped over the instrumental of "Tried by 12". The performance was called "Shady 2.0 Cypher". XXL included the performance on its list of the "Top 10 Biggest Moments of 2011".

== Track listing ==
All tracks are written by R. Smith and S. Bellamy.

"Tried by 12" (12-inch single) track listing
No.	Title	Length
1.	"Tried by 12" (radio edit)	2:56
2.	"Tried by 12" (original)	2:58
3.	"Tried by 12" (instrumental)	2:57
4.	"Tried by 12" (acapella)	2:36
