= Budakhan Mindphone =

EP by Squarepusher
- Released: 1 March 1999
- Length: 30:28
- Label: Warp
- Producer: Tom Jenkinson

Squarepusher chronology
Music is Rotted One Note (1998)	Budakhan Mindphone (1999)	Maximum Priest E.P. (1999)

Professional ratings
Review scores
Source	Rating
AllMusic	3/5 stars
The Encyclopedia of Popular Music	3/5 stars
NME	7/10 stars
Pitchfork	7.5/10

Budakhan Mindphone is the fourth EP by English electronic musician Squarepusher, released on 1 March 1999 by Warp. It follows in much the same vein as its predecessor Music is Rotted One Note, and is often classified as an EP due to its relative brevity; the cover refers to it as "a mini-album".

== Track listing ==
No.	Title	Length
1.	"Iambic 5 Poetry"	5:31
2.	"Fly Street"	4:52
3.	"The Tide"	4:25
4.	"Splask"	3:08
5.	"Two Bass Hit (Dub)"	3:32
6.	"Varkatope"	4:09
7.	"Gong Acid"	4:49
Total length:		30:26

== Charts ==
Chart (1999)	Peak position
UK Albums (OCC)	183

== See also ==
- Squarepusher 1998–99: Budakhan Mindphone
