= Numbers Lucent =

EP by Squarepusher
- Released: 20 January 2009
- Genre: Electronic; drum and bass; breakcore
- Length: 24:58
- Label: Warp
- Producer: Tom Jenkinson

Squarepusher chronology
Just a Souvenir (2008)	Numbers Lucent (2009)	Solo Electric Bass 1 (2009)

Professional ratings
Review scores
Source	Rating
Pitchfork	6.5/10

Numbers Lucent is a six-track EP by English electronic musician Squarepusher, which was released on 20 January 2009.

The cover artwork is in a similar vein to that of his previous release, Just a Souvenir, but the tracks featured here are more uptempo and energetic. There is a strong early 1990s rave feel to many of the tracks.

== Track listing ==
Numbers Lucent track listing
No.	Title	Length
1.	"Zounds Perspex"	4:07
2.	"Paradise Garage"	3:55
3.	"Heliacal Torch"	4:10
4.	"Star Time 1"	4:06
5.	"Arterial Fantasy"	4:21
6.	"Illegal Dustbin"	4:18

== Charts ==
Chart performance for Numbers Lucent
Chart (2009)	Peak position
France (SNEP)	100
