= Feed Me Weird Things =

Studio album by Squarepusher
- Released: 3 June 1996
- Recorded: December 1994 – February 1996
- Genre: Drill 'n' bass; IDM; jungle; jazz fusion
- Length: 66:27
- Label: Rephlex
- Producer: Tom Jenkinson

Squarepusher chronology
Bubble and Squeak (1996)	Feed Me Weird Things (1996)	Squarepusher Plays... (1996)

Feed Me Weird Things is the debut studio album by English electronic musician Tom Jenkinson under the alias Squarepusher. It was released on 3 June 1996 through Rephlex Records.

Upon release, Feed Me Weird Things peaked at number 10 on the UK Dance Albums Chart. The album received positive reviews from critics and has been retrospectively cited as a landmark release in the drill 'n' bass subgenre. A 25th anniversary remastered edition was released on 4 June 2021 by Warp.

== Background and production ==
Around late 1994, Tom Jenkinson started experimenting with breakbeats and incorporating them into the electronic music he produced. His earliest songs in this new style were released on the Spymania label. Jenkinson produced the tracks on Feed Me Weird Things from December 1994 to February 1996, while he was a student at Chelsea College of Art and Design. He used his student loans to purchase much of the equipment that he utilised in recording the album.

Richard D. James (also known as Aphex Twin), who co-founded Rephlex Records (where the album was originally released), selected the tracks that appeared on the final album. The tracks were mastered by Paul Solomons at the studio Porky's.

== Title and packaging ==
According to Jenkinson, the title Feed Me Weird Things was inspired by a conversation with Steve Beckett, a co-founder of the label Warp, "in which he told me about his girlfriend who would ask him to 'feed me drum & bass'." Jenkinson collaborated on the artwork for Feed Me Weird Things with Johnny Clayton.

The packaging for the album features various photographs taken by Jenkinson at different London locations in February 1996, which were subsequently edited by Clayton. The front cover photograph was taken inside a job centre in Palmers Green. The album's liner notes were penned by Richard D. James.

== Release ==
Feed Me Weird Things was released on 3 June 1996 by Rephlex Records. It entered the UK Dance Albums Chart at number 10 on 15 June. On 4 June 2021, Warp released a remastered edition of Feed Me Weird Things for the album's 25th anniversary.

== Critical reception ==
Professional ratings
Review scores
Source	Rating
AllMusic	4/5 stars
Jazzwise	4/5 stars
Mojo	4/5 stars
Muzik	5/5
NME	8/10
Pitchfork	8.0/10
PopMatters	8/10
Record Collector	4/5 stars
The Rolling Stone Album Guide	3/5 stars
Uncut	8/10

Muzik's Calvin Bush praised Feed Me Weird Things as "the kind of album Miles Davis might have made if he had been wired into breakbeats, Aphex Twin and Ninja Tune." Ben Willmott of NME deemed it Jenkinson's "most consistently varied, bedazzling and rounded deposit to date." New York Times critic Neil Strauss said that Jenkinson "deftly combines the laid-back cool of fusion jazz with the frenetic intensity of drum-and-bass" and "makes one realize just how wide a window of opportunity for musicians drum-and-bass has opened." At the end of 1996, The Wire named Feed Me Weird Things one of the year's 50 best records.

Writing for Spin, Ken Micallef said that with Feed Me Weird Things and its follow-up Hard Normal Daddy (1997), Jenkinson "did to jungle what Frank Zappa did to rock—satirized its excesses with a maze of neurotic, scurrying notes, while adding a nerdy musicality that practically invented a new genre." AllMusic credited the 1996 releases of Feed Me Weird Things and Plug's Drum 'n' Bass for Papa as catalysts for the popularisation of the drill 'n' bass subgenre. Ben Cardew of Pitchfork called Feed Me Weird Things "a time capsule of the era's drill'n'bass and jazzy jungle" that demonstrated Jenkinson's innovative fusion of "the maximal drum programming of drum 'n' bass" with live fretless bass guitar playing. AllMusic's Paul Simpson wrote that the album showed that Jenkinson "was capable of doing things nobody else had dreamt of before, and it still holds some of his all-time best material." San Diego Union-Tribune journalist AnnaMaria Stephens cited Feed Me Weird Things as one of the most important IDM albums. In 2007, The Guardian listed it as one of "1000 Albums to Hear Before You Die".

== Track listing ==
All tracks are written by Tom Jenkinson.

No.	Title	Length
1.	"Squarepusher Theme"	6:20
2.	"Tundra"	7:53
3.	"The Swifty"	5:18
4.	"Dimotane Co"	4:53
5.	"Smedleys Melody"	2:32
6.	"Windscale 2"	6:35
7.	"North Circular"	6:07
8.	"Goodnight Jade"	2:45
9.	"Theme from Ernest Borgnine"	7:55
10.	"U.F.O.'s over Leytonstone"	6:37
11.	"Kodack"	7:13
12.	"Future Gibbon"	2:19
Total length:		66:27

Japanese and 25th anniversary edition bonus tracks
No.	Title	Length
13.	"Theme from Goodbye Renaldo"	6:01
14.	"Deep Fried Pizza"	3:49
Total length:		76:17

== Charts ==
Chart (1996)	Peak position
UK Dance Albums (OCC)	10

Chart (2021)	Peak position
Dutch Vinyl Albums (Dutch Charts)	14
Japanese Albums (Oricon)	87
Japanese Top Albums Sales (Billboard Japan)	78
Scottish Albums (OCC)	16
UK Albums Sales (OCC)	12
UK Dance Albums (OCC)	2
UK Independent Albums (OCC)	4
