= Bubble and Squeak (EP) =

EP by Tom Jenkinson
- Released: May 1996
- Genre: Electronic
- Label: Worm Interface wi006
- Producer: Tom Jenkinson

Tom Jenkinson chronology
| Alroy Road Tracks (1995) | Bubble and Squeak (1996) | Feed Me Weird Things (1996) |

Professional ratings
Review scores
| Source | Rating |
|---|---|
| AllMusic | 3/5 stars |

Bubble and Squeak is an EP by Tom Jenkinson, better known as the artist Squarepusher. The EP was released on 12" vinyl format only. The name is a reference to an English dish. Three versions of the release were produced: an initial pressing with yellow hand-drawn silk-screened sleeves, limited to 200 copies; a pressing in a photo sleeve depicting a man walking through a tunnel; and a pressing in a generic grey die-cut sleeve.

== Track listing ==
Side A

1. "Bubble" - 6:15

Side B

1. "Squeak" - 7:27
