= Conumber E:P =

EP by Squarepusher
- Released: 1995
- Label: Spymania
- Producer: Tom Jenkinson

Squarepusher chronology
Crot EP (1994)	Conumber E:P (1995)	Alroy Road Tracks (1995)

Conumber E:P is the first release by Tom Jenkinson under the alias Squarepusher. The album was pressed as a 12-inch vinyl, the first release on the Spymania label.

"Conumber", "Eviscerate", and "Male Pill 5" were later released on the Squarepusher compilation Burningn'n Tree. "Eviscerate (Version)" also appears on the album in a shortened form.

== Track listing ==
Side A

1. "Conumber"
2. "Eviscerate"

Side B

1. "Male Pill 5"
2. "213 (Maritime.epsosis)"
3. "Eviscerate (Version)"
4. "Spymania Theme"
