= Ufabulum =

Studio album by Squarepusher
- Released: 14 May 2012
- Genre: Electronic; IDM
- Length: 51:15 (Standard); 65:31 (Special edition)
- Label: Warp
- Producer: Tom Jenkinson

Squarepusher chronology
| Shobaleader One: d'Demonstrator (2010) | Ufabulum (2012) | Music for Robots (2014) |

Alternative cover
- Special Edition

Singles from Ufabulum
- 1. "Dark Steering" Released: 16 April 2012

Ufabulum is the tenth album by British electronic musician Tom Jenkinson, under the alias of Squarepusher. It was released on 15 May 2012 through Warp Records. Jenkinson has stated that "It's music which is generated purely from programming. There's no live guitar or drums, there's nothing in it which is live, really." At the time of release, Jenkinson made several appearances in festivals across the world, including his first show in Brazil, at the Sónar Festival.

== Release ==
Ufabulum was released by Warp Records on 14 May 2012 in Europe, and 15 May 2012 in North America. Although Jenkinson didn't comment on what the album sounded like, in a press release he said "I've started thinking about pure electronic music again. Something very melodic, very aggressive." The album was released on CD and 2xLP as a standard edition, as well as a special edition with alternate cover art and a set of bonus tracks, later titled Enstrobia.

== Reception ==
Professional ratings
Aggregate scores
| Source | Rating |
|---|---|
| Metacritic | 70/100 |
Review scores
| Source | Rating |
| AllMusic | 4/5 stars |
| Financial Times | 4/5 stars |
| MusicOMH | 2.5/5 stars |
| NME | 6/10 |
| Pitchfork | 6.3/10 |
| The Skinny | 4/5 stars |
| Slant Magazine | 3.5/5 stars |
| Spin | 7/10 |
| Sputnikmusic | 2/5 stars |

At Metacritic, which assigns a normalised rating out of 100 to reviews from mainstream critics, Ufabulum received an average score of 70, based on 20 reviews, indicating generally favorable reviews.

Most critics gave the album a positive review. Writing for AllMusic, Fred Thomas gave the album a score of 4 out of 5, saying: "The most striking aspect of Ufabulum is the sense that Jenkinson is building on top of foundations he laid himself. Where early Squarepusher records were notable for their innovative work with beat programming or infusion of organic instruments with electronic mayhem, the songs here seem to begin with that template of jittery beats and grow into dense compositions." Simon Garner of The Quietus gave the album a mostly positive review, stating "Ufabulum is anchored in his strengths, and could be bolder in its experimentation, but there is enough new here to suggest that with a few more incremental changes he may once again make a truly surprising record." Reviewing the album for Slant Magazine, Manan Desai said "This may not be the most challenging or experimental Squarepusher album, but it feels like a step forward for an IDM artist who's been at it for nearly two decades."

Other critics were not so positive towards the album. Angus Finlayson of Fact criticised the album, saying "Back when he started, it's easy to imagine Jenkinson yearning for better gear to realise his increasingly quixotic ideas. Now the genie's out of the bottle, though, the results are far from pretty." Reviewing the album for BBC Music, Garry Mulholland said "Ufabulum is all synth instrumentals all of the time and, unlike previous albums, doesn't feature a standout classic that draws you into the album's less accessible elements."

== Track listing ==
All tracks are written by Tom Jenkinson.

Ufabulum track listing
| No. | Title | Length |
|---|---|---|
| 1. | "4001" | 6:35 |
| 2. | "Unreal Square" | 5:17 |
| 3. | "Stadium Ice" | 4:21 |
| 4. | "Energy Wizard" | 3:48 |
| 5. | "Red in Blue" | 3:11 |
| 6. | "The Metallurgist" | 3:50 |
| 7. | "Drax 2" | 7:22 |
| 8. | "Dark Steering" | 6:51 |
| 9. | "303 Scopem Hard" | 4:56 |
| 10. | "Ecstatic Shock" | 5:08 |
| Total length: | | 51:15 |

Japanese bonus track
| No. | Title | Length |
|---|---|---|
| 11. | "On Crack" | 2:29 |

Special edition CD with Enstrobia EP
| No. | Title | Length |
|---|---|---|
| 1. | "Angel Integer" | 4:04 |
| 2. | "Panic Massive" | 3:46 |
| 3. | "40.96a" | 6:27 |
| Total length: | | 14:16 |

== Personnel ==
- Tom Jenkinson – music, artwork (LED imagery)
- Nick Robertson – design, photography
- Donald Milne – photography

== Charts ==
Chart performance for Ufabulum
| Chart (2012) | Peak position |
|---|---|
| Belgian Albums (Ultratop Flanders) | 83 |
| Belgian Albums (Ultratop Wallonia) | 196 |
| UK Dance Albums (OCC) | 15 |
| UK Independent Albums (OCC) | 18 |
