= Just a Souvenir =

Studio album by Squarepusher
- Released: 27 October 2008
- Genre: Jazz; electronic; drum and bass
- Length: 44:26
- Label: Warp
- Producer: Tom Jenkinson

Squarepusher chronology
Hello Everything (2006)	Just a Souvenir (2008)	Numbers Lucent (2009)

Professional ratings
Aggregate scores
Source	Rating
Metacritic	66/100
Review scores
Source	Rating
AllMusic	4/5 stars
Drowned in Sound	7/10
The Guardian	4/5 stars
Pitchfork	7.6/10
PopMatters	7/10

Just a Souvenir is the ninth album by Squarepusher, released in October 2008.

The album originated in a daydream, in which Tom Jenkinson envisioned a rock band performing a concert against the backdrop of a large, glowing coathanger. The performance quickly became surreal: among other things, a river forces the band to kayak whilst performing; the guitarist is able to accelerate or decelerate time at will; and every drum in the drummer's kit begins to switch places with each another. As such, the majority of the album consists of Jenkinson's own version of jazz fusion, threaded through with classical guitar, math rock and funk recordings.

== Track listing ==
Just a Souvenir track listing
No.	Title	Length
1.	"Star Time 2"	5:02
2.	"The Coathanger"	4:03
3.	"Open Society"	1:04
4.	"A Real Woman"	3:04
5.	"Delta-V"	4:08
6.	"Aqueduct"	1:38
7.	"Potential Govaner"	2:11
8.	"Planet Gear"	4:03
9.	"Tensor in Green"	3:42
10.	"The Glass Road"	7:10
11.	"Fluxgate"	1:08
12.	"Duotone Moonbeam"	2:27
13.	"Quadrature"	3:20
14.	"Yes Sequitur"	1:27

Japanese bonus track
No.	Title	Length
15.	"Syntax 2"	1:45

== Charts ==
Chart performance for Just a Souvenir
Chart (2008)	Peak position
UK Dance Albums (OCC)	5
UK Independent Albums (OCC)	30
