= Do You Know Squarepusher =

Studio album by Squarepusher
- Released: 30 September 2002
- Genre: Electronic
- Length: 32:13
- Label: Warp
- Producer: Tom Jenkinson

Squarepusher chronology
Go Plastic (2001)	Do You Know Squarepusher (2002)	Ultravisitor (2004)

Singles from Do You Know Squarepusher
- 1. "Do You Know Squarepusher" Released: 2001

Professional ratings
Aggregate scores
Source	Rating
Metacritic	62/100
Review scores
Source	Rating
AllMusic	3/5 stars
BBC	unfavorable
MusicOMH	favorable
Pitchfork	4.8/10
Playlouder	3.5/5 stars
PopMatters	mixed
Stylus Magazine	F

Do You Know Squarepusher is the sixth studio album by Squarepusher, released on Warp in 2002. It peaked at number 35 on the UK Independent Albums Chart. It includes a cover of Joy Division's "Love Will Tear Us Apart". The CD version of the album includes an additional disc of live recordings, titled Alive in Japan.

== Track listing ==
All tracks are written by Tom Jenkinson, except where noted.

Do You Know Squarepusher
No.	Title	Length
1.	"Do You Know Squarepusher"	5:05
2.	"F-Train"	4:19
3.	"Kill Robok"	3:34
4.	"Anstromm-Feck 4"	3:29
5.	"Conc 2 Symmetriac"	1:23
6.	"Mutilation Colony"	10:48
7.	"Love Will Tear Us Apart" (Ian Curtis, Peter Hook, Stephen Morris, Bernard Sumner)	3:32
Total length:		32:13

Alive in Japan
No.	Title	Length
1.	"Mutilation Colony (Excerpt)"	2:43
2.	"The Exploding Psychology"	7:39
3.	"My Red Hot Car"	5:02
4.	"Do You Know Squarepusher"	5:01
5.	"Direct to Mental"	3:23
6.	"Boneville Occident"	7:13
7.	"Go! Spastic"	8:47
8.	"Greenways Trajectory"	9:50
9.	"My Fucking Sound"	8:56
10.	"Anstromm-Feck 4"	4:18
Total length:		62:55

== Charts ==
Chart	Peak position
UK Independent Albums (OCC)	35
