= Damogen Furies =

Studio album by Squarepusher
- Released: 20 April 2015
- Genre: Drum and bass, IDM, drill 'n' bass, glitch
- Length: 43:25
- Label: Warp
- Producer: Tom Jenkinson

Squarepusher chronology
Music for Robots (2014)	Damogen Furies (2015)	Elektrac (2017)

Damogen Furies is the eleventh studio album by British electronic musician Squarepusher. It was announced on 18 February 2015 and released on 20 April 2015. Along with the announcement of the album, the third track, "Rayc Fire 2", was released for free on Squarepusher's site, on which a series of live dates in support of the album were also announced.

== Critical reception ==
Professional ratings
Aggregate scores
Source	Rating
Metacritic	73/100
Review scores
Source	Rating
AllMusic	3.5/5 stars
Exclaim!	7/10
The Guardian	3/5 stars
NME	8/10
Pitchfork	7.3/10
PopMatters	7/10 discs
Q	3/5 stars
Record Collector	4/5 stars
Resident Advisor	3.3/5
Uncut	4/5 stars

Daryl Keating of Exclaim! wrote that Damogen Furies is "a scattershot release, but one that's definitely worth exploring," citing "a return to the jazz-fuelled, IDM-inflected drum & bass of Squarepusher's heyday" while also remaining "stuck in the fantasy world that has marred his last few releases."

== Track listing ==
The track listing below is as presented on the CD. On the double LP release, the track listing is reversed.

All tracks are written by Tom Jenkinson.

No.	Title	Length
1.	"Stor Eiglass"	4:32
2.	"Baltang Ort"	6:14
3.	"Rayc Fire 2"	4:44
4.	"Kontenjaz"	3:44
5.	"Exjag Nives"	5:20
6.	"Baltang Arg"	6:50
7.	"Kwang Bass"	6:15
8.	"D Frozent Aac"	5:48
Total length:		43:25

Japanese CD and Japanese iTunes bonus track
No.	Title	Length
9.	"Straks Nombir"	1:00
Total length:		44:25

== Charts ==
Chart (2015)	Peak position
Belgian Albums (Ultratop Flanders)	96
UK Albums (OCC)	110
US Top Dance Albums (Billboard)	8
