= Alroy Road Tracks =

EP by The Duke Of Harringay
- Released: 1995
- Label: Spymania spy 002
- Producer: Tom Jenkinson

The Duke Of Harringay chronology
Conumber E:P (1995)	Alroy Road Tracks (1995)	Bubble and Squeak (1996)

Alroy Road Tracks is an extended play credited to "The Duke Of Harringay", an alias for Squarepusher. It was released on 12" vinyl format only, the second release on the Spymania label. All tracks were later released on the Squarepusher compilation Burningn'n Tree.

== Track listing ==
Side A

1. "Central Line" - 3:57
2. "Sarcacid Part 1" - 5:56
3. "Sarcacid Part 2" - 5:05

Side B

1. "Nux Vomica" - 7:57
2. "Toast For Hardy" - 9:23
