= Squarepusher =

British musician

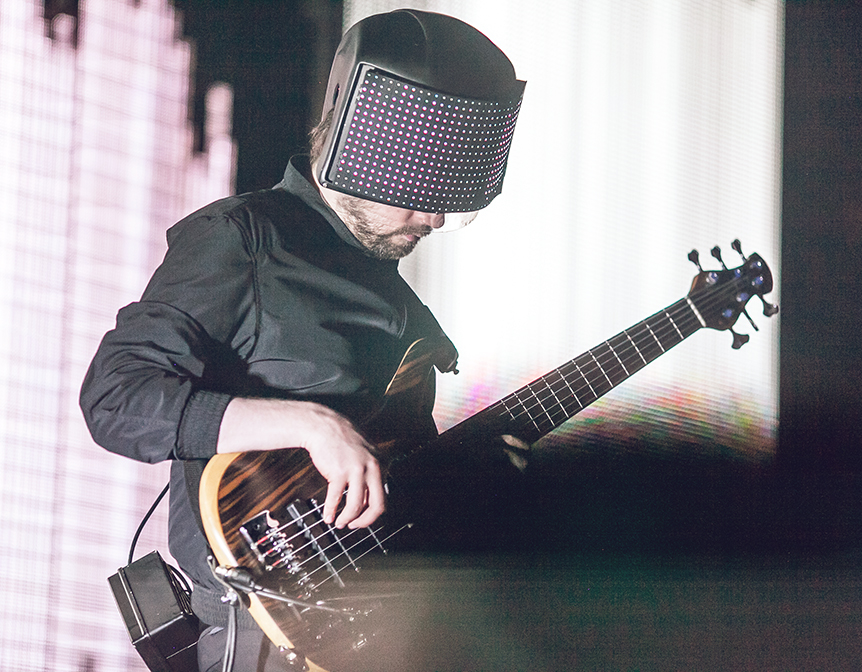
- Jenkinson performing in 2012

Background information
- Also known as: Chaos A.D. The Duke of Harringay; Tom Jenkinson
- Born: Thomas Russell Jenkinson; 17 January 1975 (age 51)
- Origin: Chelmsford, Essex, England
- Genres: IDM; electronic; DnB; acid; drill and bass; jazz fusion
- Occupations: Musician; record producer; DJ
- Instruments: Bass guitar; guitar; keyboards; synthesisers; drums; percussion
- Years active: 1993–present
- Labels: Warp; Rephlex; Worm Interface; Nothing
- Website: www.squarepusher.net

Thomas Russell Jenkinson (born 17 January 1975), known professionally as Squarepusher, is an English electronic musician, record producer, bassist, multi-instrumentalist and DJ. His music spans several genres including drum and bass, IDM, acid techno, jazz fusion, and electroacoustic music. His recordings are often typified by a combination of complex drum programming, live instrumental playing, and digital signal processing. Since 1995, he has recorded for Warp Records as well as smaller labels, including Rephlex Records. He is the older brother of Ceephax Acid Crew (Andy Jenkinson).

== Early life ==
Tom Jenkinson was born and grew up in Chelmsford, Essex, England. The first school he attended was affiliated with Chelmsford Cathedral, exposing him to organ music. He took an interest in this, as well as in music reproduction equipment. In 1986, Jenkinson went to the King Edward VI Grammar School in Chelmsford. One of his formative musical experiences came from seeing guitarist Guthrie Govan playing in the school's inter-house music competition. He developed a lasting friendship with Govan. Jenkinson joined his first band at 12, a Metallica-influenced thrash metal group consisting of several other pupils from the school. Over subsequent years Jenkinson played bass guitar in various local bands, playing numerous shows around East Anglia and London, and took part in some studio recordings.

In 1991, Jenkinson became interested in house music, hardcore, acid house and techno. He cited hearing the track "LFO" by LFO as an early influence.

Initially considering a degree in physics, Jenkinson enrolled as a Fine Arts student at the Chelsea College of Arts in London. After receiving a student loan, Jenkinson instead spent the money on musical equipment, including drum machines, a mixer, and an Akai S950 sampler.

== Career ==
=== 1993–1995: Early career ===
In August 1993, Jenkinson recorded a piece named "O'Brien"; with his friend, Hardy Finn, he raised enough money to release it with additional material on a vinyl 12". Jenkinson and his friends took the copies of the record to various local record shops but found reactions disappointing. In late 1994, Jenkinson began pursuing his fascination for integrating breakbeats into electronic music. At this time, Jenkinson was becoming obsessed with bringing a "dark psychedelia" to drum and bass (which would eventually reach its zenith with Go Plastic from 2001). By 1995 he was playing live sets, including a performance at Eurobeat 2000 at Turnmills in 1995, and "O'Brien" was part of his setlist. In 1995, he heard future Nothing Records label-mate Luke Vibert's track "Military Jazz" (released under his Plug alias) and was inspired by its approach:

This track came on and, amongst the road noise and chatter, I heard what I thought was some sort of hip-hop track being played by a band. As the track progressed, I became more intrigued, as it sounded like they were trying to play as if it had been programmed. Then the Amen [break] came in, and I was floored; it sounded like a drummer playing breakbeats, and made me totally rethink my ideas of programming breaks.

The first recordings using Jenkinson's new setup were released on the Spymania label. Two EPs, Conumber and Alroy Road Tracks, were released in 1995 under the pseudonyms Squarepusher and The Duke of Harringay, respectively. Jenkinson began receiving invitations from clubs to play regular sets, including The Sir George Robey in Finsbury Park.

It was after a gig at the George Robey where Jenkinson met Richard D. James, known professionally as Aphex Twin. The two became friends, and they agreed to release Jenkinson's first album on James' own label, Rephlex Records. Jenkinson sent James a compilation on DAT of forty tracks recorded from 1994 to 1995. James selected twelve of these tracks to form Squarepusher's debut studio album, Feed Me Weird Things, which was released on Rephlex in June 1996.

=== 1995–1999: Warp ===
In 1995, Jenkinson contributed a remix to DJ Food's "Refried Food" remix EP, released on Ninja Tune. The remix led Ninja Tune to offer Jenkinson a record contract, which - along with another offer from Belgium's R&S Records - he declined in favor of a contract offered by Warp Records. Jenkinson accepted the five-album record contract with Warp in December 1995.

Early that year Jenkinson made the acquaintance of Talvin Singh who offered him a slot at his club night "Anokha" held at the Blue Note Club in Hoxton Square, London. Jenkinson and Singh went on to play together on several occasions during this period, including improvised sessions at the end of the night at Anokha, one of which featured guitarist Guthrie Govan, and also at the first Big Chill Festival in 1996.

Shortly after the release of Feed Me Weird Things came the Port Rhombus EP, Jenkinson's first release on Warp Records. The title track was initially a remix of a track by Ken Ishii, commissioned by R&S Records in Belgium. However, the remix was rejected on the basis of it having insufficient similarity to Ishii's piece. "Significant Others" used the DR660 drum machine running through a spring reverb, that Squarepusher found at a jumble sale.

Using the same equipment from the sessions that produced the majority of Feed Me Weird Things, Squarepusher now set about working on the material for his first album for Warp, Hard Normal Daddy. His broad conception for this record was "to push away from the jazz influence that was being felt at the time to a more soundtrack-type of sound". According to Squarepusher, he was listening to—amongst other things—early Lalo Schifrin and the "Deathwish" soundtrack by Herbie Hancock around this time. However, the album also contains some abrupt diversions into quite different musical territory, evidenced in what Squarepusher calls the "Industrial Psychedelia" of "Chin Hippy" and "Rustic Raver".

Squarepusher's electric bass work becomes apparent on this record. He states that he was "still battling with the influence of (Jaco) Pastorius." He wanted to "make the styles interrogate each other, such that one track would question the premises of another and vice versa. As such I suppose it might indicate tentativeness, but in my mind at the time I liked the idea of bringing musical assumptions into question by smashing stylistically divergent elements into each other". In this he follows a precedent set by Frank Zappa, who Squarepusher claimed is "always hovering in the background" for him.

The sleeve artwork was generated from a set of images taken by Squarepusher wandering about Chelmsford town centre. The front cover image is based on a view of the gasometers situated at Wharf Road, near where he lived as a teenager. The 8-bit graphics reflected Squarepusher's resurgence of interest in old video consoles and home computers at that time. This location was subsequently used in some of the press shots in the Hello Everything promotional campaign.

In January 1997, Squarepusher moved to a flat on Albion Road in Stoke Newington, London. This particular residence was shown in the Jockey Slut "All Back to Mine" article from that year, and it was also where Squarepusher's appearance in the "xxx" documentary was filmed.

"Journey To Reedham" brings the 8-bit computer influence right into the foreground. The piece was the first to be recorded of the set and was originally commissioned to be used in a computer game, but Squarepusher decided it was too important to hand over to somebody else's project. The track immediately became a favourite at live performances and was still making appearances as an encore in Tom's run of live shows in 2013. "The Body Builder" was Tom's favourite of the set. This exemplifies a more abstract take on the 8-bit aesthetic, with sounds constructed to deliberately resemble computer game sound effects. "Come on My Selector" has become one of Squarepusher's most well-known tracks, partly due to it having a video by director Chris Cunningham. Doing the video led Squarepusher to develop a friendship with Chris Cunningham.

This period also saw the release of the Burningn'n Tree album, which was a compilation of Tom's Spymania releases. The set includes three pieces that were recorded in late 1995 during the Feed Me Weird Things sessions that were not originally released on Spymania.

Squarepusher started considering new ideas about how to put music together. At this time James introduced Squarepusher to the music of Tod Dockstader, an American composer who had worked extensively in the 1960s, principally realising his compositions by tape editing. Alongside this Squarepusher was becoming interested in the work of 20th Century composers such as Stockhausen and Ligeti, specifically their electronic and electroacoustic works.

After Budakhan Mindphone was completed in May 1998, Squarepusher went to South East Asia for two months, and on this trip acquired a selection of Gamelan instruments. He stated that he was keen to carry on with the method of making music he had developed making the "abstract jazz" elements of Music Is Rotted One Note. Given that the "abstract jazz/musique concrète" idea had in Tom's view been proven by Music Is Rotted One Note. He decided to switch focus slightly and approach the following phase with a less rigorous aesthetic in mind.

This is the first record where Squarepusher started using effects processors in such a way that values for the available parameters would all vary as the piece progressed. Squarepusher relates that "Iambic 5 Poetry" is "apparently one of Björk's favourite songs". This period also produced the "Maximum Priest" EP. "Our Underwater Torch" was partially inspired by a developing obsession he had for the sounds of water. He stated that this piece was obliquely inspired by the films Solaris and Stalker by the Russian director Andrei Tarkovsky. The organ in this piece is triggered directly from an electric bass. "Decathlon Oxide" carried on the ideas initiated in "Fly Street" and "Varkatope" from Budakhan Mindphone and features a Gamelan gong. The record also contains remixes by Luke Vibert, Autechre and Matthew Yee-King. Very few live shows happened around this time, although Squarepusher claims he did in fact do quite a few performances unannounced: He did organise two shows for an ephemeral organisation known as the "Squarepusher Ensemble" which amongst others featured Jamie Lidell on vocals, Mick Beck on saxophone and Squarepusher on bass. The idea of the group was to try to approximate some of the aesthetic of Music Is Rotted One Note and Budakhan Mindphone. The improvisation took place with no guidelines.

In March 1999, with the Budakhan Mindphone and "Maximum Priest" sessions wrapped up, he found himself in quite changed circumstances. He had made new friends in Sheffield and found himself a regular DJ and punter at various club nights around Sheffield. At this point he became quite skilled at tape editing. Another element that he was keen to bring back was the usage of sampled breakbeats. At this time, Squarepusher was frequenting a Manchester-based club night called "Schizm". It was run by friends of Sean Booth and Rob Brown from Autechre who themselves had played there on occasion.

=== 2000–2013: Go Plastic to Ufabulum ===
Early 2000 saw Squarepusher consider "radical tactics". He states it became clear that it was high time return to sequencers and leave behind the live-playing approach, which he had adopted since late 1997. Around this time, he started seeing more of Chris Cunningham.

He was also revisiting a lot of the mid-1990s drum and bass that had so inspired his early releases. He describes the set-up for Go Plastic as follows: "It was the next stage in the "liquid effects processing" idea. "To me it was all about trying to make it sound totally liquid and psychedelic, like liquid LSD. Not evil though, "evil" music just sounds daft and theatrical to me. I've always had a Frankenstein-thing going on, ever since I was kid when I was playing around with electronics. I love the idea of the set-up having such a complex level of internal activity that it begins to resemble a living being." "My Red Hot Car" is his most well known piece. That and "Boneville Occident" were two of the earliest pieces from these sessions. The piece "Tommib" was so named after Squarepusher recalls that: "Aphex [Twin] was helping me edit a track for Vic Acid and he named the project 'Tommib' and I always remembered that for some reason." Squarepusher claims that "My Fucking Sound" was written specifically with Chris Cunningham in mind: "We had talked a lot in that period about working together, loads of ideas were flying around. That track was intended for Chris to use, and that project was called "Spectral Musicians." He recalls that "Aphex [Twin] rang up when I was finishing off the track. He asked what I was up to and I said something like "I've got 31 bars left to write on this track I'm doing." He just started laughing and said he never thought of music like that. I suppose it does sound a bit strange and clinical."

After the sessions were completed in December 2000, he rang Steve Beckett to play him the record: "We hadn't talked since he left Sheffield more than a year before. I told him to come round and it totally blew his head off." Squarepusher started playing live again at this point: "I played all of this new stuff supporting Tortoise at the Shepherd's Bush Empire. I did a gig at The 100 Club and I had Chris [Cunningham] supporting me doing a DJ set."

He played his first shows in America at this point, one of which was at the Coachella Festival. The plans to collaborate with Chris Cunningham were duly interrupted as well.

In the Summer of 2001, Warp cut a one-sided promo of the track "Do You Know Squarepusher". After a brief during the latter half of 2001, he set up the studio at his new residence. Around this time, he started to work with computer-based synthesis and signal processing.

The cover version of "Love Will Tear Us Apart" has a particular story to it: "It was around this time that Rob Mitchell at Warp died. I was really fond of Rob. The last evening I spent with him was in Sheffield and he had been playing me some music by Joy Division. I decided to record that song as a memorial to him, but at the same time I really didn't want to try and divert attention from the tragedy of his death to my record, that would have been repulsive. So I kept the story to myself'. Also included in this set is an edited recording of Tom's appearance at Fuji Rock Festival in Japan in Summer 2001. He spent the remainder of 2002 working on software patches and recorded many pieces in that period that were to feature in his show at Warp's 20th anniversary party in Sheffield in 2009.

2003 saw two of Squarepusher's pieces being performed by the London Sinfonietta as part of the South Bank's Ether Festival: "It was an interesting idea. They chose "Port Rhombus" and "The Tide".

He claims the idea that had been initiated with "Mutilation Colony", namely to combine the DSP algorithmic approach with the live instrumentation based approach of Music Is Rotted One Note was now at the forefront of his mind. His studio set-up at that time incorporated all of the equipment he had amassed so far. Parts of certain tracks on Ultravisitor and four entire pieces were recorded at shows in the UK and the US in summer of 2003. As such, Squarepusher says "The start of Ultravisitor features ambient sound from the very same piece being played at a show in L.A. and the outro features ambient sound from a gig at the Leadmill in Sheffield. "Menelec" features an introduction from a show in Nottingham and the outro comes from Toronto I think. The start of "Steinbolt" was recorded in L.A. and the lots of Tetra-Sync including the live electric bass was recorded at the Bowery Ballroom in New York, apart from the intro which comes from Montreal."

He states that "Ultravisitor seems like a big argument to me. In fact I've always liked that idea, that the way you structure albums and songs is that one element raises questions about other elements. That feels interesting to me, but Ultravisitor seems to do that to the extent that it risks being completely incoherent. But that is also the fun of it. I am fond of it."

The sleeve artwork, the first to contain a portrait of Squarepusher. He toured with the London Sinfonietta, performing the piece "Tundra 4" live. After the Sinfonietta tour, he toured America and Japan.

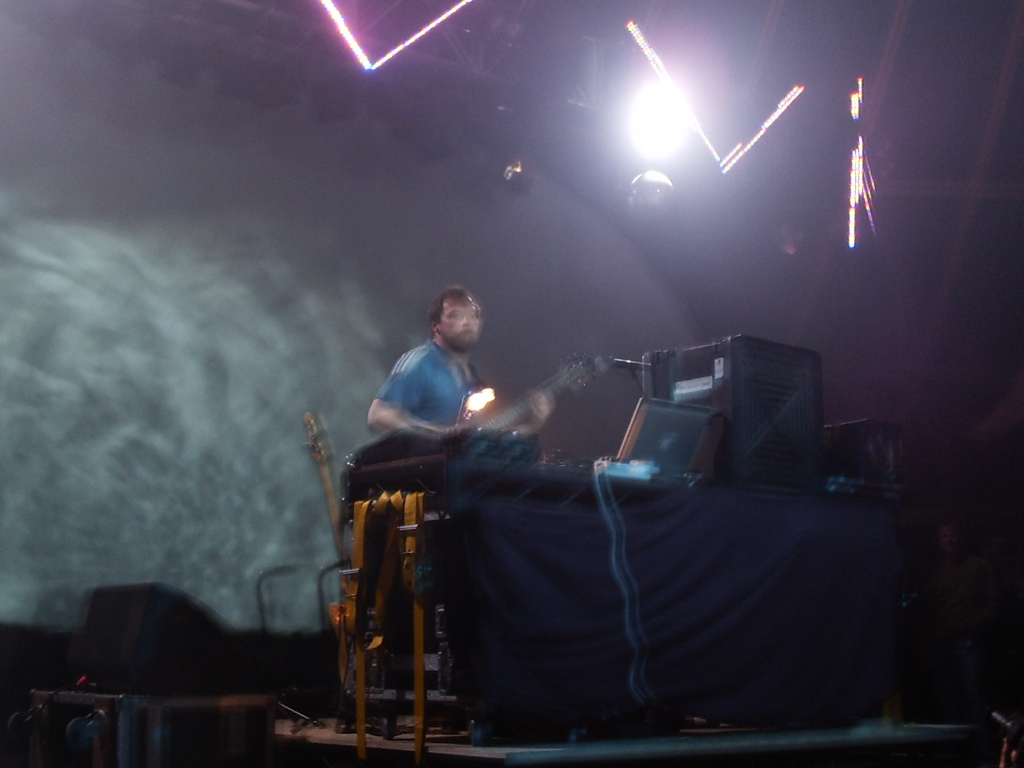
Squarepusher performing at Glade Festival in 2005

He states that at this point he had no immediate plans to make a record and that it seemed entirely possible that he would not make another. Nevertheless, some pieces were made in this period. A series of acid tracks were made, some of which were used in Tom's appearance at Warp's 20th anniversary in Sheffield 2009. "Welcome To Europe" and "The Modern Bass Guitar" were also made in this period using the same software system that Squarepusher had designed when he made Ultravisitor. The synth bassline in "The Modern Bass Guitar" was triggered from an electric bass using the midi bass system. January 2005 saw the re-establishment of the studio at Tom's residence in Essex. The pieces "Theme From Sprite", "Bubble Life", "Vacuum Garden", "Circlewave 2" and "Orient Orange" were all made in early 2005.

All of these tracks are based on live drumming tracks, which Squarepusher had planned out quite meticulously beforehand, in contrast to similarly realised tracks on Music Is Rotted One Note. "Hello Meow", "Planetarium", "Rotate Electrolyte" and "Plotinus" were made over the Summer and Autumn of 2005. The track "Hello Meow" was filmed at Koko in November 2005 and was edited into a promotional video for Hello Everything in 2006. "Planetarium" samples a particular variant of the Amen breakbeat which came from "a dodgy bootleg 12" from 1991 called Rave Masters Volume One.

Regarding the overall process of making Hello Everything, he states "There never really were any Hello Everything sessions, unlike a lot of the things I'd done before". Some editions of the album came with an extra CD entitled "Vacuum Tracks".

Squarepusher appeared at Glastonbury and Glade Festival in the summer of 2005. Then in November 2005 he toured the UK with Luke Vibert and Cassette Boy featuring dates in London, Norwich, Falmouth, Birmingham, Newcastle, Leeds and Glasgow amongst others. This tour marked the first occasion when he had appeared in concert using live visuals.

At the time of the release of Hello Everything, Squarepusher appeared on the BBC's Culture Show and was interviewed by Lauren Laverne, and also performed a short version of what was to become one of the pieces on Solo Electric Bass. It also became apparent that one of the reasons for him being requested to appear was that Andre 3000, who was also appearing on the show, had expressed such admiration for Tom's work that he would like to work with him. He also appeared at the John Peel tribute event at the Electric Ballroom in Camden around the time of the release of the record. Late 2006 saw him generate the material that was eventually to be issued in 2009 as Numbers Lucent.

After the material that went to comprise Numbers Lucent was finished at the end of 2006, Tom exhausted his interest in making electronic music: "At that point, I'd been working on electronic music in some shape or form for around fifteen years and without hardly any breaks. As I've said, one of my problems is that once I've established that an idea is in some way valid, that's generally enough for me. I'm just acutely aware of how limited time is and I think I'd rather spend it doing what I do best which is taking risks and making experiments." "I was interested to see if I could develop a way of making music that was less destructive, because I was aware of how much I had brutalised myself living such an insane life over the last twelve years or so, how little I'd slept and so on. I started thinking again about doing more playing, more bass stuff again. It's always been hard to give my bass playing any kind of priority when all of the mayhem is happening in the studio." So Tom chose to switch all of his attention to bass and to shut down the studio.

"Glenn Max, curator at the South Bank, was really encouraging and offered me a nice gig in the Queen Elizabeth Hall to showcase it." Tom went on to spend every day playing the solo pieces, re-writing them and practising them: "It became a lifestyle in the end and that was what I wanted. Tom also says that "I've never been entirely comfortable with the whole virtuoso thing. They are so many dangers associated with it. It's odd because it's so effortless for me to play that I end up falling into that virtuoso camp by default. But if that's where I am, I'm going to make some trouble in there. So I started to play around with the pieces in a way, playing them too fast. Sort of trying to make it a bit more punk and messy rather than like a spotless article of refinement."

The solo bass recording from Cité de la Musique is presented unedited as it was played on the night. The recording was released in 2009. Tom went on to sell out the Queen Elizabeth Hall and the Cité de la Musique in Paris with his Solo Electric Bass shows. Both were recorded and featured the saxophonist Evan Parker.

At the end of 2007, Squarepusher found himself at the close of the solo bass project. "I was still playing all the time every day. So it seemed logical to get recording again, but make it live playing-centred." He claims he was fed up with the unprocessed sound of the bass that was tied up in the concept of the solo bass material, so he started experimenting with new DSP algorithms specifically for the bass. Also he had become a fan of the band Lightning Bolt over the last few years and was inspired to develop an electric bass sound with "absolutely face-ripping distortion."

When Squarepusher came to tour this album, he decided he would need a drummer: "I called Glenn [Max] at the South Bank and asked him if he knew any good drummers. He suggested Alex Thomas. I checked him out and he was amazing so we went for it." Squarepusher and Thomas went on to tour in November and December 2008, and then from April 2009 through the summer playing various festivals. This tour also saw Squarepusher develop the LED aspect to his show to the extent that on stage he had a massive screen behind Alex's drum kit showing visual content triggered by his electric bass.

Regarding this album being an abrupt stylistic departure from earlier releases Toms says that: "On an instinctive level, I just can't resist seeing what happens when you press certain buttons, and especially the ones that the grown-ups tell you not to press. And as I've said, to me it's all about the experiments." In April 2011, Squarepusher played at a benefit concert for the Japanese Red Cross in the wake of the tsunami which devastated Japan on 11 March 2011.

Of the general direction, he says: "I've reached guitar overload. I've started thinking about pure electronic music again. Something very melodic, very aggressive." He used a custom LED mask as part of the live presentation of this material. At the time, he made several appearances in festivals across the world including his first show in Brazil and during the Sónar Festival in Barcelona in June.

=== 2013–present: Music for Robots to Kammerkonzert ===
On 13 February 2014, an EP entitled Music for Robots was announced, a collaborative project composed by him and performed by the three robots that comprise the Z-Machines. Squarepusher first started working with the team of Japanese roboticists behind the Z-Machines in 2013, who had commissioned him to write music for robots that were capable of playing beyond the capabilities of the most advanced musicians. Following the success of the first piece of music, entitled "Sad Robot Goes Funny", Squarepusher went on to compose four more pieces for the robots, which comprise the EP Music for Robots, released in April 2014.

On 20 April 2015, the album Damogen Furies was released. All the recordings on Damogen Furies were recorded in one take and were made using software that Squarepusher programmed himself, specially designed for spontaneous and streamlined live performance. The release of the album saw him headlining his "biggest ever" show at the Troxy in London, as well as headlining the White Stage at Fuji Rock Festival, Japan, his first appearance at the festival since 2001.

In 2016 and 2017, Squarepusher once again took his Shobaleader One band on the road. In March 2017, the band released their first live album Elektrac, featuring versions of past Squarepusher songs. Also in 2016, Jenkinson also wrote a suite of short organ pieces to be performed by James McVinnie for "The Secret Life of Organs", a UK tour celebrating the country's great organs as the first 'synthesisers' invented centuries before their electronic counterparts. A recording of this performance would later be released as the collaborative album All Night Chroma in September 2019.

In 2018, he provided the ambient soundtrack for the CBeebies hour long wind-down programme Daydreams, narrated by Olivia Colman. The same year, Jenkinson broke his wrist in Norway and was forced to temporarily stop playing guitar. The incident caused him to re-explore instruments he had previously played in the 1990s, which informed his subsequent album Be Up a Hello. Jenkinson was also influenced by the death of childhood friend Chris Marshall, to whom he dedicated the album. Be Up a Hello was released on 31 January 2020, preceded by the singles "Vortrack" and "Nervelevers". The album marked a return to Squarepusher's drill 'n' bass and acid roots.

On 21 January 2024, Squarepusher sent out an email to his subscribers on the Warp Records email list, linking to a download for a WAV file named "XY.wav". Plugging the WAV file into an oscilloscope and plotting the signal as an XY plot would reveal the word "Dostrotime", the title of his next album. Dostrotime was released on CD, LP, and digital download on 1 March 2024. The single "Wendorlan" was released to promote the album.

In February 2026, Squarepusher released "K2 Central" as the lead single to his album Kammerkonzert, which was released on Warp in April 2026. The album incorporates elements of orchestral music, including harpsichord, glockenspiel, and a string quartet.

== Political commitment ==
=== 2016: MIDI SANS FRONTIÈRES ===
In July 2016, in response to the Brexit vote, Jenkinson composed the song "Midi Sans Frontières" and released it for free, inviting anyone to remix the track and release it themselves. The project was "an attempt to challenge the toxic legacy, namely the legitimisation of racist and xenophobic attitudes in the UK, generated by several leading campaigners in the UK's referendum on membership in the EU," Jenkinson wrote in an accompanying essay, "It is not offered as a substitute for progressive political action but as a complement to it. I put it forward in defiance of the bigotry threatening the fragile connections that exist between us all. I hope it will be an opportunity to reaffirm some of those connections amidst a very disturbing situation." All people were invited to collaborate using the stems, sheet music, and MIDI files provided by Squarepusher, with the only stipulation being that, to be listed in the site's archive, any work had to be titled "Midi Sans Frontières". In the following months, nearly 300 remixes were listed on the site.

== Discography ==
=== Albums ===
Year	Title	Peak positions		
Year	Title	UK	BEL (FL)	US Dance
1996	Feed Me Weird Things	—	—	—
1997	Hard Normal Daddy	115	—	—
1998	Music Is Rotted One Note	—	—	—
1999	Selection Sixteen	—	—	—
2001	Go Plastic	100	—	—
2002	Do You Know Squarepusher	192	—	—
2004	Ultravisitor	90	—	9
2006	Hello Everything	89	—	16
2008	Just a Souvenir	—	—	17
2012	Ufabulum	101	83	14
2015	Damogen Furies	110	96	8
2020	Be Up a Hello	77	70	—
2024	Dostrotime	85	141	—
2026	Kammerkonzert	—	103	—

=== EPs, singles and promos ===
Year	Title	Notes	Peak positions	
Year	Title	Notes	UK	BEL (FL)
1994	Crot EP	Credited to Tom Jenkinson.	—	—
1994	Stereotype EP	Self-released as "Stereotype". Reissued by Warp in 2025.	—	—
1995	Conumber E:P	Released on Spymania. Partially compiled into Burningn'n Tree.	—	—
1995	Alroy Road Tracks	Released on Spymania under the alias The Duke of Harringay, later compiled into Burningn'n Tree.	—	—
1996	Bubble and Squeak	Credited to Tom Jenkinson.	—	—
1996	Dragon Disc 2	Split EP with Dunderhead, credited to Tom Jenkinson.	—	—
1996	Squarepusher Plays...	Both exclusive tracks ("Theme From Goodbye Renaldo" and "Deep Fried Pizza") appear as bonus tracks on the Japanese release of Feed Me Weird Things.	—	—
1996	Port Rhombus EP	Also compiled on the US version of Big Loada on Nothing Records	182	—
1997	Vic Acid	Single	156	—
1997	Big Loada	Also released on Nothing Records in 1998.	134	—
1998	Remixes 12"	Released under the alias Chaos A.D. on Rephlex.	—	—
1999	Budakhan Mindphone	EP	183	—
1999	Maximum Priest EP	EP	—	—
1999	Anti-Greylord Protection Scheme Prelude	EP, included with most copies of Selection Sixteen	—	—
1999	I Am Carnal, And I Know That You Approve	Collaborative EP with Richard Thomas	—	—
2001	"My Red Hot Car"	Single, reached number 1 on the UK Budget Albums Chart.	—	—
2001	"Do You Know Squarepusher"	Single for the album of the same name; no titles appear on this release, just the song "Do You Know Squarepusher".	—	—
2003	"Ultravisitor"	Single for Ultravisitor.	—	—
2004	Square Window	EP	—	—
2004	Venus No. 17	EP	103	—
2006	"Welcome to Europe"	Exclusive digital single No. 1: released 4 September (Also available on Hello Everything).	—	—
2006	"Hanningfield Window"	Exclusive digital single No. 2: released 18 September.	—	—
2006	"Exciton"	Exclusive digital single No. 3: released 2 October.	—	—
2006	Vacuum Tracks	Released with certain editions of Hello Everything.	—	—
2006	"Welcome to Europe"	12" vinyl single.	—	—
2009	Numbers Lucent	EP	—	—
2010	Shobaleader One: Cryptic Motion	Single by Shobaleader	—	—
2012	"Dark Steering"	Single from Ufabulum	—	—
2013	Enstrobia	Bonus EP with Ufabulum special edition	—	—
2014	Music for Robots	EP with the Z-Machines	—	171
2020	Lamental EP	EP following Be Up a Hello	—	—
2024	"Wendorlan"	Single from Dostrotime	—	—

=== Other ===
- Burningn'n Tree (1997) - compilation
- Buzz Caner (1998) - as Chaos A.D.
- Solo Electric Bass 1 (2009) - live
- Shobaleader One: d'Demonstrator (2010) - as Squarepusher Presents: Shobaleader One
- KCRW Session (2012)
- Elektrac (2017) - as Shobaleader One
- All Night Chroma (2019) - with James McVinnie; as Tom Jenkinson

=== Remixes ===
Year	Original artist	Title
1996	DJ Food	"Scratch Yer Head" (Squarepusher Mix)
1996	Funki Porcini	"Carwreck" (Squarepusher Mix)
1998	East Flatbush Project	"Tried By 12" (Squarepusher Mix)
2001	Chaos A.D.	"Psultan" (Squarepusher Mix)
2009	Charlotte Hatherley	"White, Pt. 2" (Squarepusher Mix)
2013	Ghostpoet	"Meltdown" (Squarepusher Remix)
2016	Michael Gordon & Mantra Percussion	"Timber Remixed: Squarepusher"
2019	Close Up Over	"Caz" (Squarepusher Remix)
2020	Deftones	"Pink Maggit" (Squarepusher Remix)
2021	GoGo Penguin	"F Maj Pixie" (Squarepusher Remix)
2021	Danny Elfman	"We Belong" (Squarepusher Remix)
2025	Machine Girl	"Ass2Mars" (Squarepusher Remix)

== See also ==
- Warp Records
- Rephlex Records
