= Yoichiro Murakami =

Japanese scholar

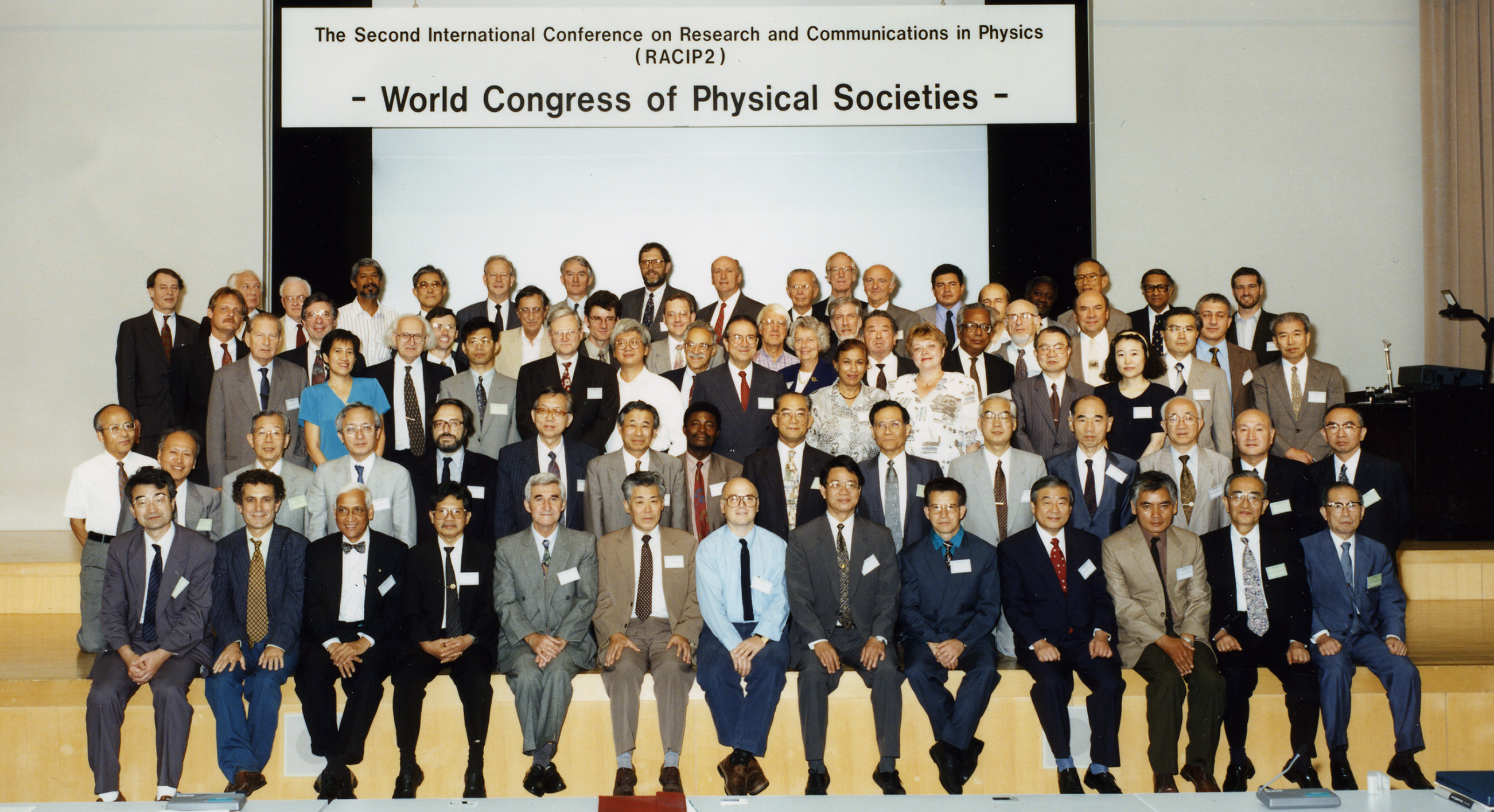
- Murakami at the Second International Conference on Research and Communications in Physics
- Born: 9 September 1936 (age 89); Tokyo, Japan
- Education: Tokyo University
- Scientific career
- Workplaces: Sophia University; International Christian University

Yoichiro Murakami (村上 陽一郎, Murakami Yōichirō) born in Tokyo, Japan on September 9, 1936, is a Japanese scholar. He specializes in the areas of history of science and philosophy of science.

== Early life ==
Murakami studied at the Hibiya High School before attaining his undergraduate degree at Tokyo University in the field of education.

== Academic career ==
After teaching for a brief period at Sophia University in Yotsuya, Murakami moved to teach at International Christian University in Mitaka, Tokyo.

Murakami has written numerous books and essays on a variety of subjects in the field of the study of science. Under the history of science his field of specialization lies in physics. His current research focuses primarily on the philosophical concept of the reconciliation of border transgression in the context of the paradigm.

== Other interests ==
Murakami is also known to play the cello.
