= Music for Robots (EP) =

EP by Squarepusher
- Released: April 2014
- Genre: Experimental, jazz, electronic, IDM
- Length: 23:23
- Label: Warp Records

Squarepusher chronology
Ufabulum (2012)	Music for Robots (2014)	Damogen Furies (2015)

Music for Robots is a collaborative project composed by Squarepusher and performed by the three robots that comprise the Z-Machines.

Having been approached by the team of Japanese roboticists behind the three Z-Machine robots to compose music for the project in 2013, Squarepusher composed the piece "Sad Robot Goes Funny" which was used in a film of the robots performing directed by Daito Manabe.

Following the success of the initial piece of music, Squarepusher went on to compose and record the additional four pieces that make up the Music for Robots EP.

== Track listing ==
No.	Title	Length
1.	"Remote Amber"	2:24
2.	"Sad Robot Goes Funny"	5:14
3.	"World Three"	4:39
4.	"Dissolver"	7:16
5.	"You Endless"	3:50

== Charts ==
Chart (2014)	Peak position
Belgian Albums (Ultratop Flanders)	171
