= Music Is Rotted One Note =

Studio album by Squarepusher
- Released: 12 October 1998
- Genre: IDM; jazz fusion; post-rock
- Length: 48:28
- Label: Warp
- Producer: Tom Jenkinson

Squarepusher chronology
Remixes 12" (1998)	Music Is Rotted One Note (1998)	Budakhan Mindphone (1999)

Music Is Rotted One Note is the third studio album by English electronic musician Squarepusher, released on 12 October 1998 by Warp. The album is a departure for Squarepusher, with only elements of the familiar drum and bass style appearing in a largely jazz fusion production.

== Background and composition ==
The production of Music Is Rotted One Note did not involve any sequencing or sampling equipment, which had featured heavily on Squarepusher's previous work. Many of the tracks instead have a "live" feel, played by Squarepusher on the drums and bass guitar. His own comments on the album include:

One of the reasons that I headed in that direction as opposed to the more computer sequence-type stuff is because I was actually beginning to feel really limited using sequencers and samplers... I was really beginning to yearn for the sort of unpredictability of the randomness of improvising with live instruments. I was just starting to choke. The sequencer is too square, too digital. I just wanted to get really fucking loose and just start again somehow.

There were also other principles at play at this time relating to harmonic content. One was that I was to abandon the overt usage of melody. This was because I had come to see it as a cheap way of getting people to like my music. It disgusted me that it was so easy to appeal to people and I thus introduced arbitrary rules to make it harder.

== Reception ==
Professional ratings
Review scores
Source	Rating
AllMusic	4.5/5 stars
NME	8/10
Pitchfork	9.8/10
The Rolling Stone Album Guide	1.5/5 stars
Spin	7/10

In 2003, Pitchfork placed Music Is Rotted One Note at number 89 on its list of the best albums of the 1990s.

== Track listing ==
All tracks are written by Tom Jenkinson.

No.	Title	Length
1.	"Chunk-S"	2:20
2.	"Don't Go Plastic"	4:20
3.	"Dust Switch"	4:28
4.	"Curve 1"	2:06
5.	"137 (Rinse)"	3:45
6.	"Parallelogram Bin"	2:24
7.	"Circular Flexing"	4:57
8.	"Ill Descent"	2:37
9.	"My Sound"	6:07
10.	"Drunken Style"	0:45
11.	"Theme from Vertical Hold"	4:25
12.	"Ruin"	1:56
13.	"Shin Triad"	2:26
14.	"Step 1"	1:46
15.	"Last Ap Roach"	4:00

== Charts ==
Chart (1998)	Peak position
UK Independent Albums (OCC)	40
