= Hard Normal Daddy =

Studio album by Squarepusher
- Released: 28 April 1997
- Genres: Drill 'n' bass; IDM
- Length: 62:37
- Label: Warp
- Producer: Tom Jenkinson

Squarepusher chronology
Port Rhombus EP (1996)	Hard Normal Daddy (1997)	Big Loada (1997)

Singles from Hard Normal Daddy
- 1. "Vic Acid" Released: 31 March 1997

Hard Normal Daddy is the second studio album by English electronic musician Tom Jenkinson under the alias Squarepusher, released on 28 April 1997. The album was Jenkinson's first studio album as Squarepusher for Warp. A single for the track "Vic Acid" was released in 1997 prior to the album's release.

Hard Normal Daddy received positive reviews from critics and was listed as one of the best albums of 1997 by NME and The Wire. The album has received further acclaim years after its release, with Stylus Magazine referring to it in 2003 as Squarepusher's "masterpiece" and Pitchfork ranking it in 2017 as one of the greatest IDM albums of all time.

== Background ==
Tom Jenkinson was offered to sign to Ninja Tune, Rephlex Records, R&S Records and Warp. Jenkinson eventually chose Warp as he was more interested in the label's music.

=== Music ===
Pitchfork's Seth Colter Walls cited the album's musical style as an early example of the drill 'n' bass subgenre, described by the online music database AllMusic as a version of drum 'n' bass that warped "old midtempo beats and breaks into a frenzied, experimental potpourri of low-attention-span electronic music."

Baltimore Sun critic J. D. Considine described the album as jazz fusion influenced, characterising its contents as "lyrical, complicated keyboard riffs, dense, churning beats, nimble, melodic fretless bass – add in a saxophone, and you'd have the drum 'n' bass equivalent of Weather Report." Tom Jenkinson has stated that his music on Hard Normal Daddy was not influenced by jazz fusion but by funk-oriented music such as Herbie Hancock's Death Wish soundtrack and 1970s television themes from police and detective shows.

== Artwork ==
The album art for Hard Normal Daddy was designed by Jenkinson and Johnny Clayton, who had previously collaborated on the artwork for Jenkinson's 1996 debut album as Squarepusher, Feed Me Weird Things. Clayton encouraged Jenkinson to again take inspiration from Jenkinson's hometown of Chelmsford, which had also inspired the artwork for Feed Me Weird Things. Given a camera, Jenkinson took photos of various locations in the town, including sheds where illegal raves were held and the local park, which are depicted in the CD packaging, as well as a run-down gas container that features on the album cover. The packaging artwork has a note of dedication to the Chelmsford rave scene.

== Release ==
Hard Normal Daddy was released by Warp on 28 April 1997. It was released on compact disc, double vinyl, cassette and digital download. A single was released for the album for the track "Vic Acid" on 31 March 1997 by Warp on compact disc and 12-inch vinyl.

== Reception ==
Professional ratings
Review scores
Source	Rating
AllMusic	5/5 stars
Muzik	7/10
NME	6/10
The Rolling Stone Album Guide	3.5/5 stars

Hard Normal Daddy received positive reviews upon release. In a contemporary review, Muzik critic Rupert Howe praised Hard Normal Daddy as an album of "style, wit and crafty ingenuity", albeit one that "isn't always quite as clever as it would like to think it is". Writing for NME, Andy Crysell noted Jenkinson's "passion for jazz that separates him from that other most weirdy and beardy of dance warriors" but called the album "schizophrenic", expressing frustration at its "high-velocity experimentation" and perceived emphasis on virtuosity.

NME placed Hard Normal Daddy at number 34 on its list of best albums of 1997. The Wire named it among the best albums of the year. In December 1998, Alternative Press ranked Hard Normal Daddy at number 54 on its list of the 90 best albums of the 1990s.

== Legacy ==
Years after release, Hard Normal Daddy has been acclaimed by critics. Retrospectively, Sean Cooper of AllMusic gave Hard Normal Daddy five out of five stars, comparing it favourably to similar releases from the music labels Spymania and Rephlex and describing the album as "substantially cleaner and more thought out than previous releases" from those labels. Cooper further praised the album for not "simply relying on the shock value of 'tripping-over-myself' drum programming and light-speed fretless bass noodling." In 2003, Todd Burns of Stylus Magazine referred to the album as Squarepusher's "masterpiece" and wrote that Jenkinson "refrains from such mind numbing repetition and put down his most accomplished work to that point." In 2004's The New Rolling Stone Album Guide, critic Douglas Wolk wrote that on the album, Jenkinson "either sublimates [his beats] to tunes like 'Cooper's World' that approximate an early-'70s sort of funk-jazz hybrid, or makes them carry delirious tracks like 'Chin Hippy' with almost no help".

Writing in Spin, jazz writer Ken Micallef noted the album for its influence on the drill 'n' bass subgenre and stated that, with Feed Me Weird Things and Hard Normal Daddy, Jenkinson "did to jungle what Frank Zappa did to rock—satirized its excesses with a maze of neurotic, scurrying notes, while adding a nerdy musicality that practically invented a new genre." In 2017, Pitchfork placed Hard Normal Daddy at number 24 on its list of "The 50 Best IDM Albums of All Time".

In 1999, Jenkinson referred to the music on Feed Me Weird Things and Hard Normal Daddy as "already beginning to sound a bit... It sort of reminds me of being a bit younger in a way. It's a bit more (of a) naive approach, a bit more fresh. The sound as well. I've gotten better production".

== Track listing ==
All songs composed by Tom Jenkinson.

No.	Title	Length
1.	"Cooper's World"	5:09
2.	"Beep Street"	6:37
3.	"Rustic Raver"	5:08
4.	"Anirog D9"	1:11
5.	"Chin Hippy"	3:16
6.	"Papalon"	8:10
7.	"E8 Boogie"	8:13
8.	"Fat Controller"	5:38
9.	"Vic Acid"	3:07
10.	"Male Pill Part 13"	8:38
11.	"Rat/P's and Q's"	4:33
12.	"Rebus"	2:47
Total length:		62:37

== Personnel ==
- Tom Jenkinson – writing, production
- Frank Arkwright – mastering
- John Clayton – visuals

== Charts ==
Chart (1997)	Peak position
UK Albums (Official Charts)	115

== See also ==
- 1997 in music
- Music of the United Kingdom (1990s)
