= Bleep (store) =

Online music store

Bleep Limited
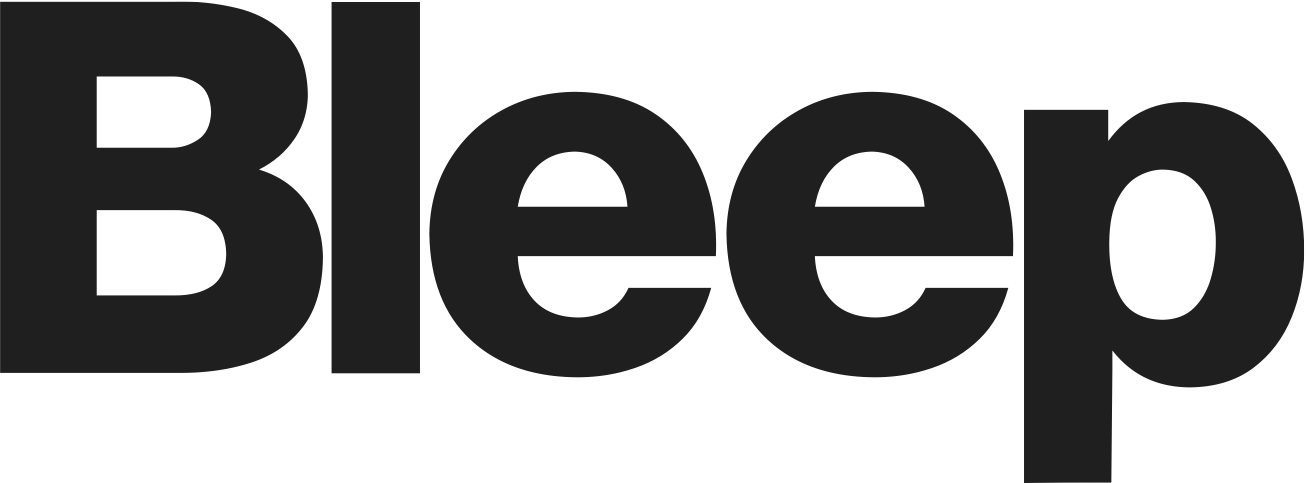
- Launch date: 14 January 2004; 22 years ago
- Pricing model: Fixed
- Availability: United Kingdom, United States, Europe
- Website: bleep.com

Bleep is an online independent record shop that mainly showcases music from independent artists and labels. Created by Warp Records and launched in January 2004, Bleep offers single tracks and whole albums as both digital and physical purchases, the latter including vinyl records, compact cassettes and CDs. All music they sell is free of digital rights management (DRM) technologies. They also sell DVDs, clothing, and other merchandise from a variety of labels and designers.

Since its launch, the range of music offered by Bleep has grown and now provides music from independent labels, including Rough Trade, Domino, 4AD, One Little Independent Records, XL Recordings, Ninja Tune, Stones Throw, Hyperdub, Planet Mu, Big Dada, and Tempa. Throughout the years Bleep has also developed a curatorial side in addition to its retail one via the monthly NTS shows, podcast and mix series, weekly roundups of recommended new music featuring the Album Of The Week, stage presence at festivals and more.

== Overview ==
Bleep was launched initially on 14 January 2004 as a download store for releases on Warp Records. The website quickly expanded its catalogue to include releases on other labels, gaining enough popularity to receive nomination for a Webby Award in the music category on 7 May 2004 alongside iTunes, Beatport, Live365 and musicplasma. In 2006, Bleep passed the million downloads threshold and in October of that year won the UK Digital Music Award for "Best Music Store".

Bleep provides music encoded as MP3 files, FLAC files, or WAV files, all of which are free of digital rights management (DRM) technology in addition to vinyl and cassette records.

In November 2008, Bleep merged with Warpmart, which had been Warp's store for physical releases. This has resulted in Bleep being not only a download store, but a full mail order retail service.

Entire tracks and albums can be previewed prior to purchase.

A large catalogue of rare titles has been acquired from many small labels from all over the world.

Ochre, the direct to consumer music retail platform that evolved from Bleep.com, is used to power Bleep.com as well as the sites of various independent labels.

== See also ==
- Beatport
- Electronic dance music
- Juno Records
