= List of UK Singles Downloads Chart number ones of the 2020s =

This is the list of the number-one songs of the UK Singles Downloads Chart during the 2020s. As of 27 August 2026, 170 different singles have topped the chart during the 2020s.

== Number one songs ==
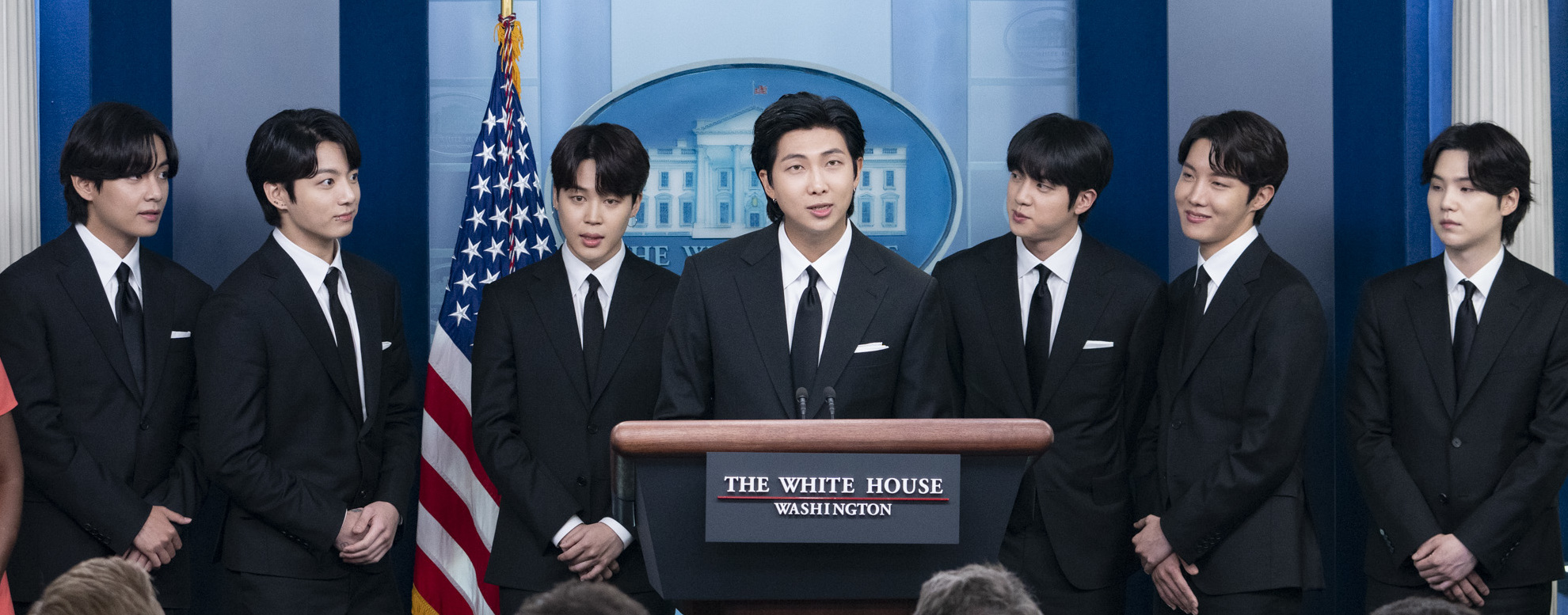
BTS have topped the chart eight times during the 2020s so far, the most by any artist.

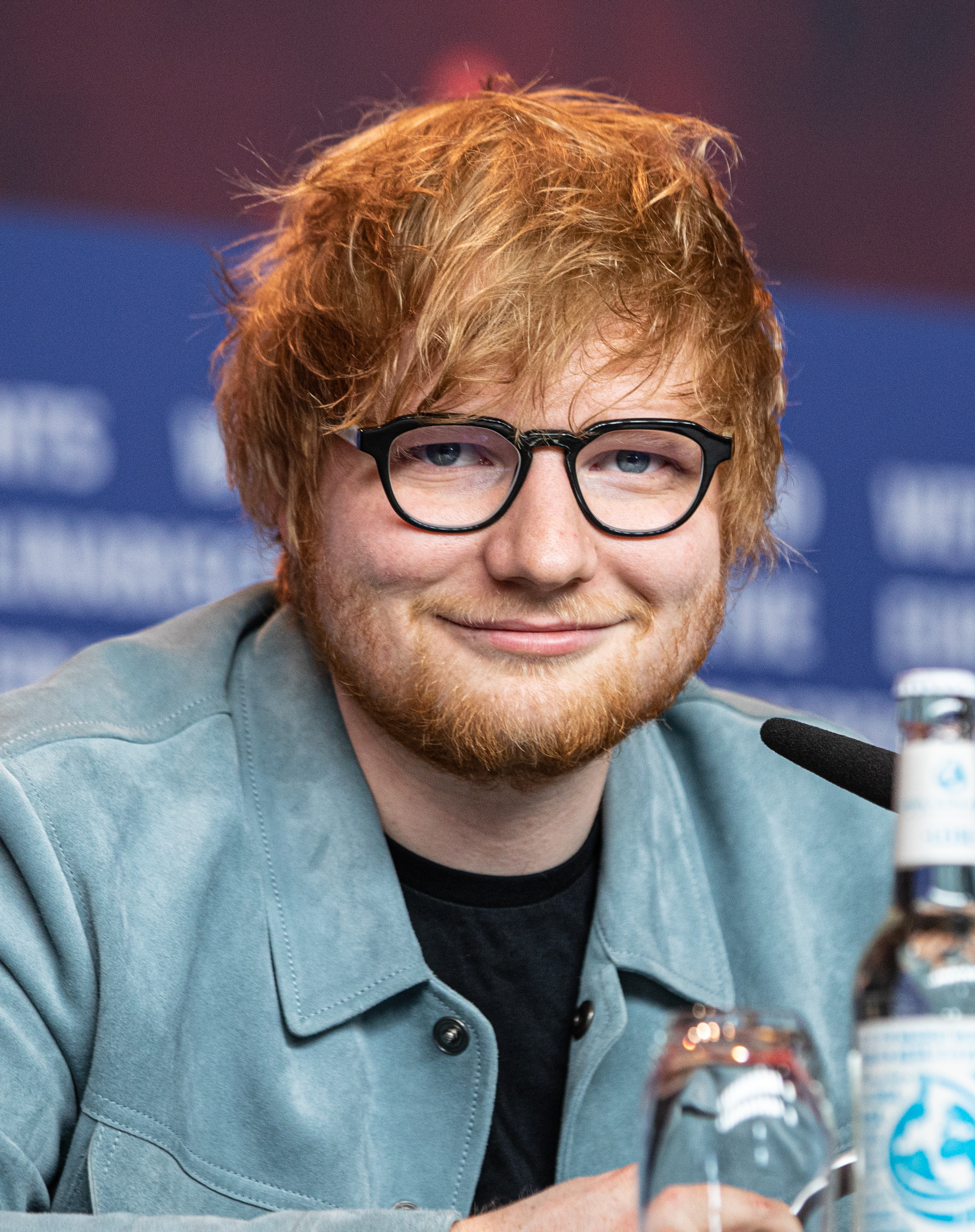
Ed Sheeran has spent 26 weeks at the top of the chart during the 2020s so far, the most by any artist.

Key
No.	nth single to top the UK Singles Downloads Chart
re	Return of a single to number one
†	Most-downloaded single of the year

No.	Artist (Note: The artist, single, date of reaching number one and number of weeks at number one are those given by the Official Charts Company.)	Single	Record label	Reached number one (for the week ending)	Weeks at number one
2020
re	Tones and I	"Dance Monkey"	Bad Batch	2 January 2020	1
381	Lewis Capaldi	"Before You Go"	EMI	9 January 2020	1
re	Tones and I	"Dance Monkey"	Bad Batch	16 January 2020	1
382	The Weeknd	"Blinding Lights" †	Republic	23 January 2020	2
383	André Rieu	"Ode to Joy"	Decca	6 February 2020	1
re	The Weeknd	"Blinding Lights" †	Republic	13 February 2020	2
384	Billie Eilish	"No Time to Die"	Interscope	27 February 2020	1
385	BTS	"On"	Big Hit	5 March 2020	1
386	Lady Gaga	"Stupid Love"	Interscope	12 March 2020	1
re	The Weeknd	"Blinding Lights" †	Republic	19 March 2020	4
387	Matt Lucas	"Thank You Baked Potato"	Loudmouth Music	16 April 2020	1
re	The Weeknd	"Blinding Lights" †	Republic	23 April 2020	1
388	Michael Ball, Captain Tom and The NHS Voices of Care Choir	"You'll Never Walk Alone"	Decca	30 April 2020	1
389	Live Lounge Allstars	"Times Like These"	BBC/Columbia	7 May 2020	2
re	The Weeknd	"Blinding Lights" †	Republic	21 May 2020	2
390	Lady Gaga and Ariana Grande	"Rain on Me"	Interscope	4 June 2020	4
391	Jawsh 685 and Jason Derulo	"Savage Love (Laxed – Siren Beat)"	RCA	2 July 2020	4
392	Joel Corry featuring MNEK	"Head & Heart"	Asylum/Perfect Havoc	30 July 2020	1
393	Nathan Dawe featuring KSI	"Lighter"	Atlantic	6 August 2020	1
re	Joel Corry featuring MNEK	"Head & Heart"	Asylum/Perfect Havoc	13 August 2020	3
394	BTS	"Dynamite"	Big Hit	3 September 2020	2
395	Miley Cyrus	"Midnight Sky"	RCA	17 September 2020	2
396	Sigala & James Arthur	"Lasting Lover"	Ministry of Sound	1 October 2020	1
397	Everton F.C.	"Spirit of the Blues"	13th Moon	8 October 2020	1
re	Miley Cyrus	"Midnight Sky"	RCA	15 October 2020	2
re	Joel Corry featuring MNEK	"Head & Heart"	Asylum/Perfect Havoc	29 October 2020	1
398	KSI featuring Craig David and Digital Farm Animals	"Really Love"	BMG	5 November 2020	1
399	Paul Harvey and BBC Philharmonic	"Four Notes – Paul's Tune"	Redrocca	12 November 2020	2
400	BBC Radio 2 Allstars	"Stop Crying Your Heart Out"	Decca	26 November 2020	1
401	BTS	"Life Goes On"	Big Hit	3 December 2020	1
402	Liam Gallagher	"All You're Dreaming Of"	Warner	10 December 2020	1
403	Mental As Anything	"Live It Up"	Crimson	17 December 2020	1
404	Rock Choir/Vocal Group/Caroline Redman Lusher	"Keeping the Dream Alive"	Rock	24 December 2020	1
405	LadBaby	"Don't Stop Me Eatin'"	FrtyFve	31 December 2020	1
2021
406	Asian Dub Foundation	"Comin' Over Here"	Xray	7 January 2021	1
407	Little Mix	"Sweet Melody"	RCA	14 January 2021	1
408	Olivia Rodrigo	"Drivers License"	Interscope	21 January 2021	1
409	Anne-Marie, KSI and Digital Farm Animals	"Don't Play"	Atlantic	28 January 2021	1
410	Nathan Evans, 220 Kid and Billen Ted	"Wellerman"	Polydor	4 February 2021	4
411	Ella Henderson and Tom Grennan	"Let's Go Home Together"	Atlantic	4 March 2021	1
412	Rag'n'Bone Man	"All You Ever Wanted"	Best Laid Plans/Columbia	11 March 2021	1
re	Nathan Evans, 220 Kid and Billen Ted	"Wellerman"	Polydor	18 March 2021	2
413	KSI featuring Yungblud and Polo G	"Patience"	BMG/Interscope	1 April 2021	1
re	Ella Henderson and Tom Grennan	"Let's Go Home Together"	Atlantic	8 April 2021	1
414	Joel Corry, Raye and David Guetta	"Bed"	Asylum/Perfect Havoc	15 April 2021	1
415	Rag'n'Bone Man and Pink	"Anywhere Away from Here"	Best Laid Plans/Columbia	22 April 2021	1
416	Riton, Nightcrawlers and Mufasa & Hypeman	"Friday"	Ministry of Sound	29 April 2021	1
re	Rag'n'Bone Man and Pink	"Anywhere Away from Here"	Best Laid Plans/Columbia	6 May 2021	1
417	Little Mix	"Confetti"	RCA	13 May 2021	1
re	Rag'n'Bone Man and Pink	"Anywhere Away from Here"	Best Laid Plans/Columbia	20 May 2021	2
418	BTS	"Butter"	Big Hit	3 June 2021	2
419	Anne-Marie and Niall Horan	"Our Song"	Atlantic	17 June 2021	1
420	Woody & Kleiny and The Hoosiers	"Route 66"	FrtyFve	24 June 2021	1
421	KSI	"Holiday"	BMG	1 July 2021	1
422	Ed Sheeran	"Bad Habits" †	Asylum	8 July 2021	10
423	Elton John and Dua Lipa	"Cold Heart"	EMI	16 September 2021	3
424	Coldplay and BTS	"My Universe"	Parlophone	7 October 2021	1
re	Elton John and Dua Lipa	"Cold Heart"	EMI	14 October 2021	2
425	Adele	"Easy on Me"	Columbia	28 October 2021	2
426	Ed Sheeran	"Shivers"	Asylum	11 November 2021	2
re	Elton John and Dua Lipa	"Cold Heart"	EMI	25 November 2021	1
427	Anne-Marie and Niall Horan	"Everywhere"	Atlantic/Capitol	2 December 2021	1
re	Elton John and Dua Lipa	"Cold Heart"	EMI	9 December 2021	1
428	Ed Sheeran and Elton John	"Merry Christmas"	Atlantic	16 December 2021	2
429	LadBaby featuring Ed Sheeran and Elton John	"Sausage Rolls for Everyone"	FrtyFve	30 December 2021	2
2022
430	Gayle	"ABCDEFU"	Atlantic	13 January 2022	2
431	Lost Frequencies and Calum Scott	"Where Are You Now"	Insanity	27 January 2022	1
432	Meat Loaf	"Bat Out of Hell"	Epic	3 February 2022	1
re	Lost Frequencies and Calum Scott	"Where Are You Now"	Insanity	10 February 2022	1
433	Liam Gallagher	"Everything's Electric"	Warner	17 February 2022	1
434	Ed Sheeran	"The Joker and the Queen"	Asylum	24 February 2022	5
435	Jax Jones featuring MNEK	"Where Did You Go?"	Polydor	31 March 2022	1
436	Camila Cabello featuring Ed Sheeran	"Bam Bam"	Asylum/Columbia	7 April 2022	1
437	Harry Styles	"As It Was"	Columbia	14 April 2022	1
438	Pink Floyd featuring Andriy Khlyvnyuk	"Hey, Hey, Rise Up!"	Rhino	21 April 2022	1
re	Harry Styles	"As It Was"	Columbia	28 April 2022	1
439	The Wanted	"Gold Forever"	Geffen	5 May 2022	1
re	Harry Styles	"As It Was"	Columbia	12 May 2022	1
440	Lizzo	"About Damn Time"	Atlantic	19 May 2022	1
441	Sam Ryder	"Space Man"	Parlophone	26 May 2022	2
442	The Kunts	"Prince Andrew Is a Sweaty Nonce"	Radical Rudeness	9 June 2022	1
443	Kate Bush	"Running Up That Hill"	Fish People	16 June 2022	3
444	LF System	"Afraid to Feel"	Warner	7 July 2022	5
445	Beyoncé	"Break My Soul"	Columbia/Parkwood Entertainment	11 August 2022	1
446	KSI featuring Tom Grennan	"Not Over Yet"	Atlantic	18 August 2022	1
re	LF System	"Afraid to Feel"	Warner	25 August 2022	2
447	Elton John and Britney Spears	"Hold Me Closer"	EMI/RCA	8 September 2022	1
448	David Guetta and Bebe Rexha	"I'm Good (Blue)"	Parlophone	15 September 2022	1
449	Lewis Capaldi	"Forget Me"	Vertigo	22 September 2022	1
re	David Guetta and Bebe Rexha	"I'm Good (Blue)"	Parlophone	29 September 2022	6
450	Rihanna	"Lift Me Up"	Def Jam	10 November 2022	1
451	Taylor Swift	"Anti-Hero"	EMI	17 November 2022	2
452	Meghan Trainor	"Made You Look"	Epic	1 December 2022	1
453	Joel Corry and Tom Grennan	"Lionheart (Fearless)"	Atlantic	8 December 2022	1
454	Lewis Capaldi	"Pointless"	Vertigo	15 December 2022	2
455	LadBaby	"Food Aid" †	BMG	29 December 2022	1
2023
456	The Sidemen	"Christmas Drillings"	Sidemen	5 January 2023	1
re	Meghan Trainor	"Made You Look"	Epic	12 January 2023	1
re	Lewis Capaldi	"Pointless"	Vertigo	19 January 2023	1
457	Miley Cyrus	"Flowers" †	Columbia	26 January 2023	8
458	Calvin Harris and Ellie Goulding	"Miracle"	Columbia	23 March 2023	1
459	Jimin	"Set Me Free Pt. 2"	Big Hit	30 March 2023	1
460	Jimin	"Like Crazy"	Big Hit	6 April 2023	2
re	Calvin Harris and Ellie Goulding	"Miracle"	Columbia	20 April 2023	1
461	Lewis Capaldi	"Wish You the Best"	Vertigo	27 April 2023	3
462	The Krown Jewelz	"Scrap the Monarchy"	Pegging Prince	18 May 2023	1
463	Loreen	"Tattoo"	UMG International	25 May 2023	1
464	Kylie Minogue	"Padam Padam"	BMG	1 June 2023	5
465	Stephen Sanchez	"Until I Found You"	Republic	6 July 2023	1
re	Kylie Minogue	"Padam Padam"	BMG	13 July 2023	2
466	Jungkook featuring Latto	"Seven"	Big Hit	27 July 2023	1
467	Sinéad O'Connor	"Nothing Compares 2 U"	Chrysalis	3 August 2023	1
468	Calvin Harris and Sam Smith	"Desire"	Columbia	10 August 2023	3
469	Oliver Anthony	"Rich Men North of Richmond"	DistroKid	31 August 2023	1
470	Miley Cyrus	"Used to Be Young"	Columbia	7 September 2023	1
471	Kylie Minogue	"Tension"	BMG	14 September 2023	1
472	V	"Slow Dancing"	Big Hit	21 September 2023	1
473	Fred Again	"Adore U"	Atlantic	28 September 2023	1
474	Cassö, Raye and D-Block Europe	"Prada"	Ministry of Sound	5 October 2023	1
475	Jungkook featuring Jack Harlow	"3D"	Big Hit	12 October 2023	1
476	Jennie	"You & Me"	Interscope	19 October 2023	1
re	Cassö, Raye and D-Block Europe	"Prada"	Ministry of Sound	26 October 2023	2
477	The Beatles	"Now and Then"	Apple	9 November 2023	1
478	Jungkook	"Standing Next to You"	Big Hit	16 November 2023	1
479	Change and Check Choir/Joss Stone	"Golden"	ITV Studios	23 November 2023	1
480	Jack Harlow	"Lovin on Me"	Atlantic	30 November 2023	2
481	The Pogues featuring Kirsty MacColl	"Fairytale of New York"	Pogue Malone	14 December 2023	1
482	The Krackpots	"Proper Christmas"	Official Kulture	21 December 2023	1
483	Creator Universe	"I Wish It Could Be Christmas Everyday"	We Create Popular	28 December 2023	1
2024
484	Sam Ryder	"You're Christmas to Me"	East West/Rhino	4 January 2024	1
485	Noah Kahan	"Stick Season"	Republic	11 January 2024	1
486	Teddy Swims	"Lose Control" †	Warner	18 January 2024	1
487	Ariana Grande	"Yes, And?"	Republic	25 January 2024	1
re	Teddy Swims	"Lose Control" †	Warner	1 February 2024	3
488	Beyoncé	"Texas Hold 'Em"	Columbia/Parkwood	22 February 2024	5
489	V	"Fri(end)s"	Big Hit Music	28 March 2024	1
re	Beyoncé	"Texas Hold 'Em"	Columbia/Parkwood	4 April 2024	1
490	J-Hope, Gaeko and Yoon Mi-rae	"Neuron"	Big Hit Music	11 April 2024	1
re	Beyoncé	"Texas Hold 'Em"	Columbia/Parkwood	18 April 2024	1
491	Perrie	"Forget About Us"	Columbia	25 April 2024	1
492	Hozier	"Too Sweet"	Island	2 May 2024	2
re	Teddy Swims	"Lose Control" †	Warner	16 May 2024	1
493	RM	"Come Back To Me"	Big Hit	23 May 2024	1
494	Shaboozey	"A Bar Song (Tipsy)"	Dogwood/Empire	30 May 2024	1
495	RM	"Lost"	Big Hit	6 June 2024	1
496	Eminem	"Houdini"	Interscope	13 June 2024	1
497	Jungkook	"Never Let Go"	Big Hit	20 June 2024	1
re	Shaboozey	"A Bar Song (Tipsy)"	Dogwood/Empire	27 June 2024	2
498	Jimin featuring Loco	"Smeraldo Garden Marching Band"	Big Hit	11 July 2024	1
re	Shaboozey	"A Bar Song (Tipsy)"	Dogwood/Empire	18 July 2024	2
499	Jimin	"Who"	Big Hit	1 August 2024	3
500	Chase & Status and Stormzy	"Backbone"	0207/EMI/Merky	22 August 2024	1
501	Lady Gaga and Bruno Mars	"Die with a Smile"	Atlantic/Interscope	29 August 2024	1
502	Coldplay	"We Pray"	Parlophone	5 September 2024	1
re	Lady Gaga and Bruno Mars	"Die with a Smile"	Atlantic/Interscope	12 September 2024	1
503	Linkin Park	"The Emptiness Machine"	Warner	19 September 2024	1
504	Teddy Swims	"Bad Dreams"	Atlantic	26 September 2024	1
re	Lady Gaga and Bruno Mars	"Die with a Smile"	Atlantic/Interscope	3 October 2024	1
505	Kylie Minogue	"Lights Camera Action"	BMG	10 October 2024	1
506	Lisa	"Moonlit Floor"	RCA	17 October 2024	1
507	Marti Pellow/Change and Check Choir	"Love Is All Around"	ITV Studios	24 October 2024	1
508	Rosé and Bruno Mars	"APT."	Atlantic	31 October 2024	1
509	Jin	"I'll Be There"	Big Hit	7 November 2024	1
510	Sam Clegg	"Send Me a Sign"	Sam Clegg Music	14 November 2024	1
re	Rosé and Bruno Mars	"APT."	Atlantic	21 November 2024	1
511	Jin	"Running Wild"	Big Hit	28 November 2024	1
re	Rosé and Bruno Mars	"APT."	Atlantic	5 December 2024	1
512	V and Park Hyo-shin	"Winter Ahead"	Big Hit	12 December 2024	1
513	Sir Starmer and Granny Harmers	"Freezing This Christmas"	IMusician Dissident Brit	19 December 2024	3
2025
re	Rosé and Bruno Mars	"APT."	Atlantic	9 January 2025	2
514	Myles Smith	"Nice to Meet You"	Sony Music	23 January 2025	1
515	Lola Young	"Messy"	Island	30 January 2025	2
516	James Marriott	"I Don't Want to Live Like This"	Independent	13 February 2025	1
re	Lola Young	"Messy"	Island	20 February 2025	4
517	J-Hope featuring Miguel	"Sweet Dreams"	Big Hit	20 March 2025	1
518	Doechii	"Anxiety"	Capitol	27 March 2025	1
519	J-Hope	"Mona Lisa"	Big Hit	3 April 2025	1
520	Alex Warren	"Ordinary" †	Atlantic	10 April 2025	1
521	Ed Sheeran	"Azizam"	Asylum	17 April 2025	2
re	Alex Warren	"Ordinary" †	Atlantic	1 May 2025	3
522	Calvin Harris featuring Clementine Douglas	"Blessings"	Columbia	22 May 2025	1
523	Jin	"Don't Say You Love Me"	Big Hit	29 May 2025	1
re	Alex Warren	"Ordinary" †	Atlantic	5 June 2025	2
524	Ed Sheeran	"Sapphire"	Asylum	19 June 2025	1
525	J-Hope featuring GloRilla	"Killin' It Girl"	Big Hit	26 June 2025	1
re	Ed Sheeran	"Sapphire"	Asylum	3 July 2025	1
526	Lewis Capaldi	"Survive"	Polydor	10 July 2025	2
re	Ed Sheeran	"Sapphire"	Asylum	24 July 2025	1
527	Yungblud	"Changes"	Capitol	31 July 2025	1
re	Alex Warren	"Ordinary" †	Atlantic	7 August 2025	1
528	Huntrix	"Golden"	K-Pop Demon Hunters	14 August 2025	7
529	Lewis Capaldi	"Something in the Heavens"	Polydor	2 October 2025	1
530	Raye	"Where Is My Husband!"	Human Re Sources	9 October 2025	1
re	Lewis Capaldi	"Something in the Heavens"	Polydor	16 October 2025	1
531	Taylor Swift	"The Fate of Ophelia"	EMI	23 October 2025	1
re	Huntrix	"Golden"	K-Pop Demon Hunters	30 October 2025	1
re	Taylor Swift	"The Fate of Ophelia"	EMI	6 November 2025	6
re	Raye	"Where Is My Husband!"	Human Re Sources	18 December 2025	1
532	Together for Palestine	"Lullaby"	T4P	25 December 2025	2
2026
re	Raye	"Where Is My Husband!"	Human Re Sources	8 January 2026	2
533	Bruno Mars	"I Just Might"	Atlantic	22 January 2026	1
534	Victoria Beckham	"Not Such an Innocent Girl"	Virgin	29 January 2026	1
535	Harry Styles	"Aperture"	Columbia	5 February 2026	1
536	Bruce Springsteen	"Streets of Minneapolis"	Columbia	12 February 2026	1
537	Two Connors	"Familiar Faces"	Isekai Broke	19 February 2026	1
538	Taylor Swift	"Opalite"	EMI	26 February 2026	1
539	Sam Fender and Olivia Dean	"Rein Me In"	Polydor	5 March 2026	1
540	Alex Warren	"Fever Dream"	Atlantic	12 March 2026	1
541	Harry Styles	"American Girls"	Columbia	19 March 2026	1
542	Bebe Rexha and Faithless	"New Religion"	Bebe Rexha Music/Empire	26 March 2026	1
543	BTS	"Swim"	Big Hit	2 April 2026	4
544	Olivia Rodrigo	"Drop Dead"	Geffen	30 April 2026	1
re	Alex Warren	"Fever Dream"	Atlantic	7 May 2026	1
545	The Chemical Brothers	"Go"	Virgin	14 May 2026	4
546	Ariana Grande	"Hate That I Made You Love Me"	Republic	12 June 2026	1
547	Taylor Swift	"I Knew It, I Knew You"	EMI	19 June 2026	1
548	BTS	"Come Over"	Big Hit	26 June 2026	1
549	Hugel, Imael Angel and Ultra Naté	"Movin' to the Sun"	Make the Girls Dance	2 July 2026	4
550	BTS	"Normal"	Big Hit	30 July 2026	1
re	Sam Fender and Olivia Dean	"Rein Me In"	Polydor	6 August 2026	2
551	Madonna and Kylie Minogue	"Love Sensation"	Warner	20 August 2026	1
re	Hugel, Imael Angel and Ultra Naté	"Movin' to the Sun"	Make the Girls Dance	27 August 2026	2
552	Ella Langley	"Choosin' Texas"	Columbia/Sawgod	4 September 2026	1
re	Hugel, Imael Angel and Ultra Naté	"Movin' to the Sun"	Make the Girls Dance	11 September 2026	3
553	Taylor Swift	"Patient Zero"	EMI	8 October 2026	1
re	Hugel, Imael Angel and Ultra Naté	"Movin' to the Sun"	Make the Girls Dance	15 October 2026	1
554	Jamie Miller	"Babydoll"	Republic	22 October 2026	5

=== By artist ===
Seven different artists have had at least four number-one singles on the UK Singles Downloads Chart so far during the 2020s. The totals below include only credited performances..

Artist	Number-one singles
BTS	8
Ed Sheeran	6
Lewis Capaldi	6
Taylor Swift	5
Jimin	4
J-Hope	4
Kylie Minogue	4

=== By weeks at number one ===
Twenty three artists have spent seven or more weeks at the top of the UK Singles Downloads Chart so far during the 2020s. The totals below include only credited performances, and do not include appearances on charity ensembles.

Artist	Weeks at number one
Ed Sheeran	26
Miley Cyrus	13
BTS	13
Lewis Capaldi	12
Taylor Swift	12
The Weeknd	11
Elton John	11
Kylie Minogue	10
Hugel	10
Imael Angel	10
Ultra Naté	10
Bruno Mars	9
Beyoncé Knowles	8
Lady Gaga	8
Huntrix	8
Raye	8
Alex Warren	8
Dua Lipa	7
LF System	7
David Guetta	7
Bebe Rexha	7
Joel Corry	7
Jimin	7

=== By record label ===
Thirteen records labels have spent 10 weeks or more so far at number one during the 2020s.

Record label	Number-one singles	Weeks at number one
Columbia	18	40
Big Hit	27	33
Atlantic	18	32
EMI	9	22
Asylum	8	29
Republic	4	18
Warner	6	16
Polydor	5	14
BMG	7	13
Interscope	7	12
RCA	6	12
Parlophone	3	10
Make The Girls Dance	1	10
