= Fuck the Tories =

2022 single by the Kunts

Single by the Kunts
- Released: 16 December 2022
- Genre: Punk rock; comedy music
- Length: 2:17
- Label: Tactical Voting

The Kunts singles chronology
"Fuck Off Boris You Cunt" (2022)	"Fuck the Tories" (2022)	"Scrap the Monarchy" (2023)

Music video
- "Fuck the Tories" on YouTube

Music video
- "Stuff the Tories" (SFW version) on YouTube

"Fuck the Tories" (stylised as "Fuck the T*ries") is a single by the Kunts, a band created by Kunt and the Gang, released in 2022. It is a satirical protest song attacking the Conservative Party, known colloquially as the Tories, who formed the government of the United Kingdom from 2010 to 2024. The song was released in an attempt to be the UK Singles Chart Christmas number one.

The Kunts have had two previous attempts to get the Christmas No. 1, in 2020 and 2021 with the songs "Boris Johnson Is a Fucking Cunt" and "Boris Johnson Is Still a Fucking Cunt" respectively which both reached No. 5, and in 2022 issued the anti-monarchist single "Prince Andrew Is a Sweaty Nonce" during the week of the Platinum Jubilee of Elizabeth II. The song reached No. 7.

== History ==
"Fuck the Tories" was the third attempt by the Kunts to be the UK Christmas No. 1 single. In 2020, their first attempt, "Boris Johnson Is a Fucking Cunt", reached No. 5. In 2021, their follow-up single, "Boris Johnson Is Still a Fucking Cunt", also reached No. 5. On both occasions, the No. 1 went to the YouTuber LadBaby, who went on to become the joint-record hold for the most Christmas No. 1s with the Beatles (as well as breaking the record for most consecutive Christmas No. 1s, previously held by the Beatles and the Spice Girls), with a series of charity singles involving sausage rolls raising money for the Trussell Trust. This has resulted in a rivalry between the two, with LadBaby saying that, "it takes a certain sort of person to download a song with that in the title". The Kunts frontman, Kunt, has attacked LadBaby by starting work on a musical about him entitled The Great Sausage Roll Swindle, and revealing lyrics to a song calling LadBaby a "sausage roll cunt".

On 11 December 2022, LadBaby announced a new song in attempt to be Christmas No. 1 for the fifth time in a row, a cover of "Do They Know It's Christmas?" with finance expert Martin Lewis and other musicians. Kunt reacted to the news by calling out Lewis, describing LadBaby as, "the sausage roll grifter", and urged people to instead donate money to the Trussell Trust directly. Kunt said in an interview with Clash that he was confused that while the original "Do They Know It's Christmas?" 100% of their proceeds to the charity, LadBaby was being more ambiguous by offering 100% of their profits. In an interview NME, Kunt said: "Having seen him lie to his fans this week by telling them the best way to donate to charity is to buy his song, I fully despair for anyone that is still falling for his ‘It’s all for charity’ schtick." The Kunts were given some positive press coverage, with Adam Miller in The Herald reporting the attempt while attacking LadBaby's song as cynical, writing: "If I wanted guilt and sausage rolls I'd meet my mum for lunch."

The song attacks the Conservative Party, nicknamed the Tories, with the band describing it as a, "barbed but factually accurate protest song shining a light in simplest terms on 12 years of Conservative corruption, lies and incompetence". Examples of lyrics in the song include the line: "They fucked up the economy, they fucked the NHS / they fucked up the environment we're in a fucking mess". If the song were to reach No. 1, it would break the record for the most uses of the word "fuck" in a UK Christmas No. 1, currently held by "Killing in the Name" by Rage Against the Machine, which reached the position in 2009 and uses the word 17 times.

A music video for the song was released on 2 December 2022, which features people acting as various Conservative politicians in a wrestling match, including a man in a Boris Johnson mask. On 8 December 2022, a video for a safe-for-work version of the song retitled "Stuff the T*ries" was released. Twelve different versions of the song were launched in order to increase the chances of the song making it up in the charts, with remixes of the original being made by sks2002, Petrol Bastard, Spray, Mr.B The Gentleman Rhymer, Rob Manuel, Cassetteboy and Armagortion. Over the course of the week a further eight releases also came out, which included alternative versions created by The Kunts and remixes by artists Ricardo Autobahn and sc.Dave!, comedian Tom Mayhew and online personality Supertanskiii.

On 18 December, the song reached No. 12 in the midweek chart, but BBC Radio 1 show The Official Chart: First Look On Radio 1, presenters Vick Hope and Katie Thistleton neither named the Kunts or the song, despite the safe-for-work version. The song was also banned by the Bauer Media Group and GB News. Amazon refused to display the song's artwork. On 21 December, the track had risen to No. 8. Ultimately, the track reached No. 7, losing to LadBaby for a third time. In response to the news Kunt mocked LadBaby by creating a posting a poster on Twitter parodying the cover of the album The Great Rock 'n' Roll Swindle.

== Reception ==
Amelia Vandergast of Reyt Good Magazine gave a mixed review of "Fuck the Tories", praising the sentiment behind the song, but being critical of the songwriting. Joyzine gave the song a positive review, arguing, "there is a message of Christmas hope, love and charity still lit in the hearts of so many of all us people."

== Aftermath ==
In November 2023, The Kunts announced that their next attempt at the Christmas No. 1 would be a song called "Proper Christmas" under new name "The Krackpots". The tune was the same as "Fuck the Tories". Unlike their previous attempts at the Christmas chart, but following on from the band's last single, "Scrap the Monarchy" as The Krown Jewels, it featured no swearing.

== Charts ==
Chart performance for "Fuck The Tories"
Chart (2022)	Peak position
UK Singles (OCC)	7
UK Indie (OCC)	4

== See also ==
- Tory scum
