= The Grand Old Duke of York =

Nursery rhyme

Nursery rhyme
- Published: 1642
- Songwriter: unknown

"The Grand Old Duke of York" is an English children's nursery rhyme, often performed as an action song. The eponymous duke has been argued to be a number of the bearers of that title, particularly Prince Frederick, Duke of York and Albany (1763–1827), and its lyrics (where the duke marches ten thousand soldiers up and down a hill for no apparent reason) have become proverbial for futile action. It has a Roud Folk Song Index number of 742. "The Grand Old Duke of York" is also sung to the tune of "A-Hunting We Will Go".

The oldest version of the song that survives is from 1642, under the title 'Old Tarlton's song', attributed to the stage clown Richard Tarlton (1530–1588). The lyrics of this version were referring to a King of France instead of a Duke.

== Words ==
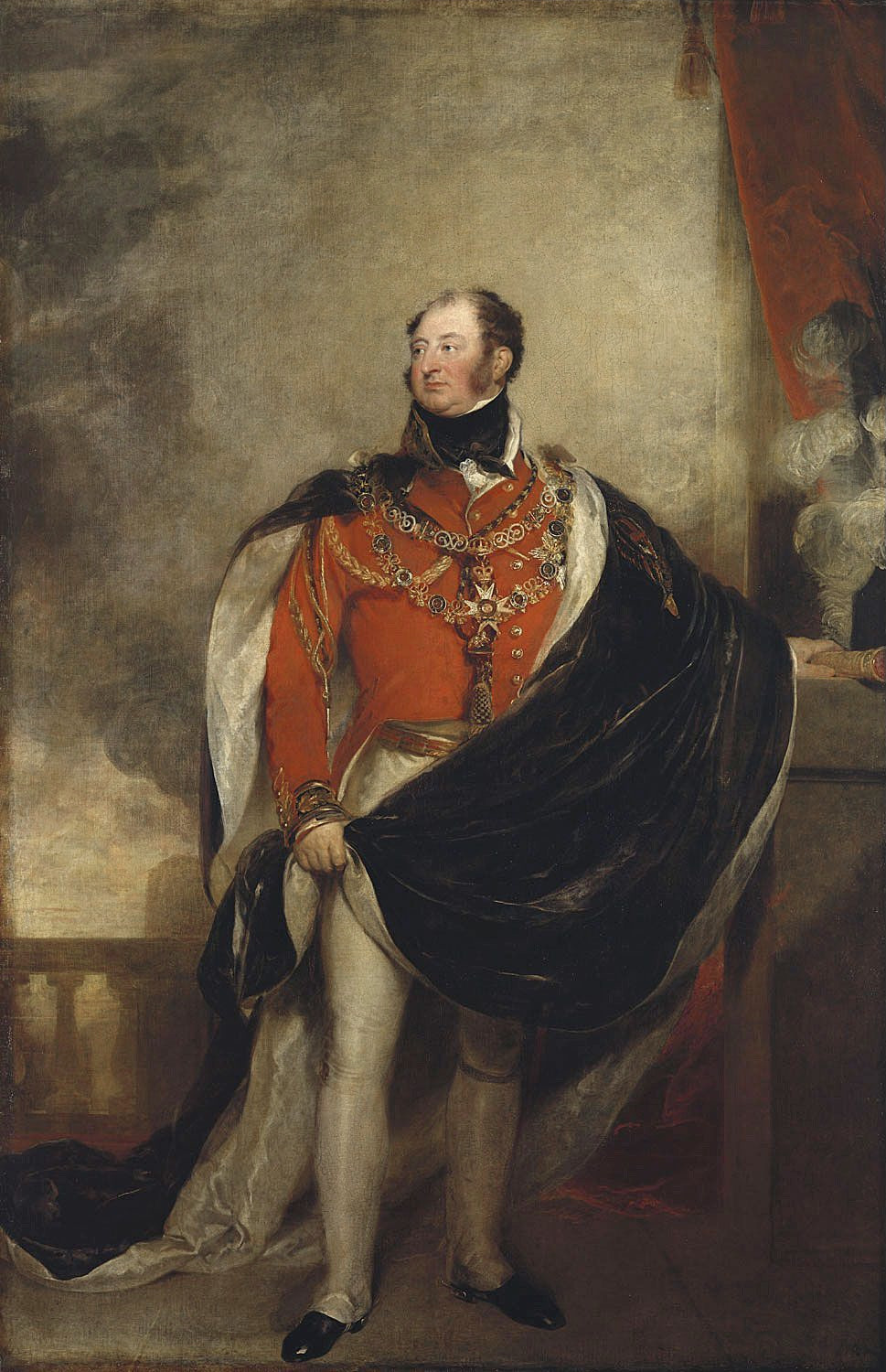
Portrait of the Duke of York by Thomas Lawrence. The song is often associated with the Duke of York and the Flanders Campaign of the 1790s.

A modern version is:

Oh, the grand old Duke of York,
He had ten thousand men;
He marched them up to the top of the hill,
And he marched them down again.

When they were up, they were up,
And when they were down, they were down,
And when they were only halfway up,
They were neither up nor down.

== Origins ==
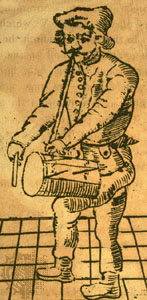
Richard Tarlton in the 1580s with his pipe and tabor

Like many popular nursery rhymes the origins of the song have been much debated and remain unclear. Unusually the rhyme clearly refers to a historical person and debates have tended to circulate around identifying which Duke is being referred to in the lyrics. The lyrics were not printed in their modern form until relatively recently, in Arthur Rackham's Mother Goose in 1913. Prior to that a number of alternatives have been found including a note that in Warwickshire in 1892 the song was sung of both the Duke of York and the King of France; from 1894 that it was sung of Napoleon. The oldest version of the song that survives is from 1642, under the title 'Old Tarlton's song', attributed to the stage clown Richard Tarlton (1530–1588) with the lyrics:

The King of France with forty thousand men,
Came up a hill and so came downe againe.

As a result, the argument has been made that it may have been a common satirical verse that was adapted as appropriate and, because it was recorded in roughly the modern form, has become fixed on the Duke of York. Candidates for the duke in question include:

- Richard, Duke of York (1411–1460), who was defeated at the Battle of Wakefield on 30 December 1460. Richard's army, some 8,000 strong, was awaiting reinforcements at Sandal Castle in Wakefield (the castle was built on top of a Norman motte). He was surrounded by Lancastrian forces some three times that number, but chose to sally forth to fight. Richard died in a pitched battle at Wakefield Green, together with between one third and one half of his army.
- James II (1633–1701), formerly Duke of York, who in 1688 marched his troops to Salisbury Plain to resist the invasion from his son-in-law William of Orange, only to retreat and disperse them as his support began to evaporate.
- The most common attribution is to Prince Frederick, Duke of York and Albany (1763–1827), the second son of King George III and Commander-in-Chief of the British Army during the French Revolutionary Wars and the Napoleonic Wars. His most significant field command was during the Flanders Campaign of 1793–94. Despite the British troops having some success against the French, in the summer of 1794 the Duke was obliged to retreat into the Netherlands and he was subsequently recalled to England. Flanders having something of a reputation for being flat, the specific location of the "hill" in the nursery rhyme has been suggested to be the town of Cassel, which is built on a hill which rises 176 metres (about 570 feet) above the flat lands of French Flanders in northern France.

Apart from the ducal title in the song and the events of their lives there is no external evidence to link the rhyme to any of these candidates.

== Dutch version ==
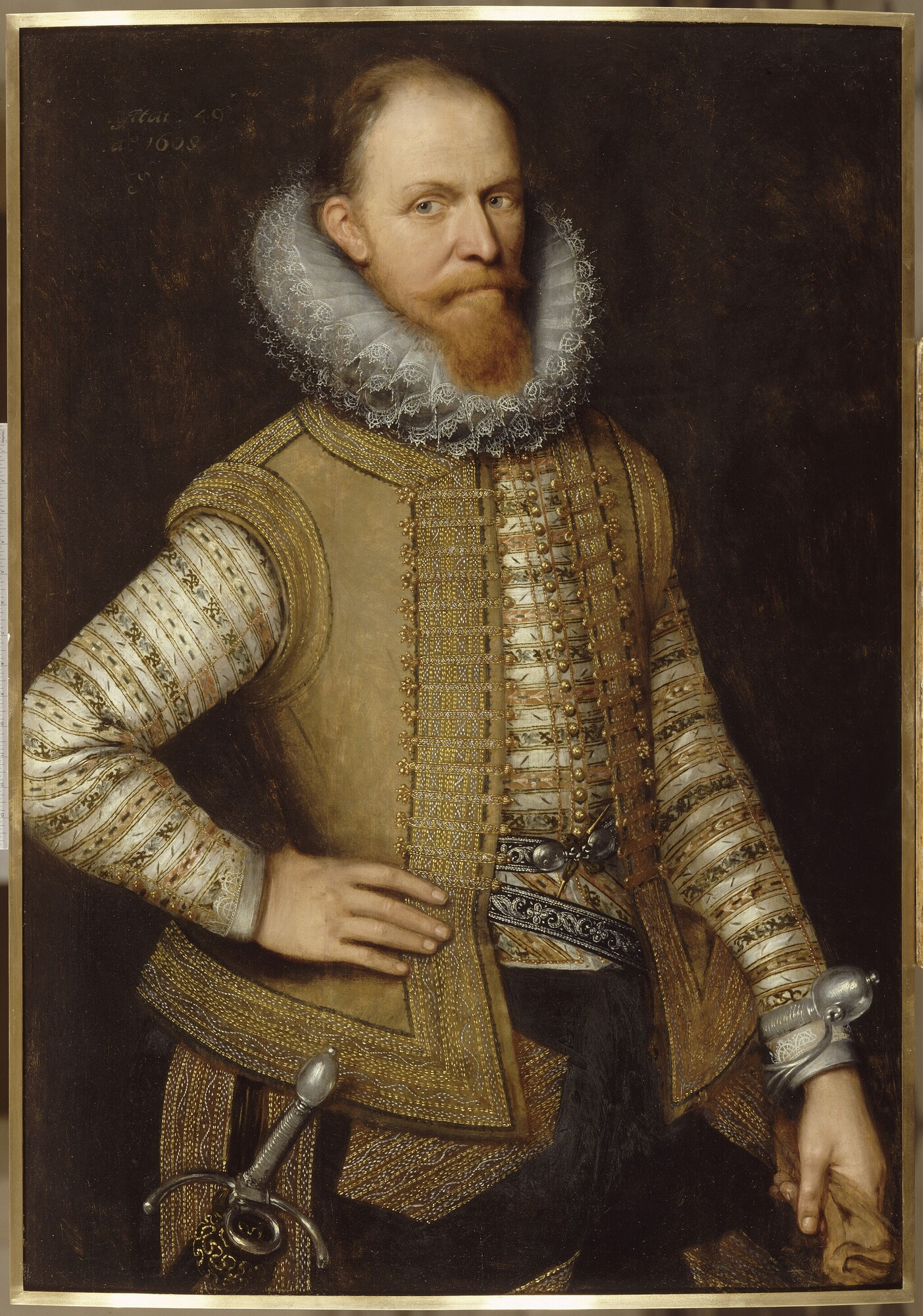
Maurice, Prince of Orange

A Dutch adaptation of the song replaces the Duke of York with Maurice, Prince of Orange (1567–1625), whose practice of training mercenaries (completely new and mocked at first) became famous after his success in war. It is not known when the British song crossed the North Sea, but it is now well known within the Dutch scouting movement.

De held prins Maurits kwam
met honderdduizend man
daar ging hij mee de heuvel op
en ook weer naar benee
en was 'ie bovenan
dan was 'ie niet benee
en was 'ie halverwege
was 'ie boven noch benee

The hero Prince Maurice came
with a hundred thousand men
with them he went up the hill
and also down again
and when he was up
then he wasn't down
and when he was half-way
he was neither up nor down

== In popular culture ==
In February 2022, parodies of the nursery rhyme appeared, referencing the then Duke of York, Andrew Mountbatten-Windsor's reported £12 million out-of-court settlement with Virginia Giuffre. Then in May there were further references to the nursery rhyme in the satirical single "Prince Andrew Is a Sweaty Nonce" by the musician Kunt and the Gang.
