= Proper Christmas =

2023 single by the Krackpots

Single by The Krackpots
- Released: 8 December 2023
- Genre: Punk rock; comedy
- Label: Official Kulture

The Krackpots singles chronology
"Bum the Runner" (2023)	"Proper Christmas" (2023)

Music video
- "Proper Christmas" on YouTube

"Proper Christmas" is the latest single by the Krackpots, a band created by Kunt and the Gang, released on 8 December 2023. It is a follow-up to three previous singles released by the group under the name the Kunts, with which they attempted to make the UK Singles Chart Christmas number one, a trio of swear-word-laden satirical punk rock songs entitled "Boris Johnson Is a Fucking Cunt" from 2020, "Boris Johnson Is Still a Fucking Cunt" from 2021, and "Fuck the Tories" from 2022.

== History ==
While "Proper Christmas" is the first single attempt by the Krackpots, it is the fourth attempt by the people who make up the band, formerly known as "The Kunts". In 2020, their first attempt, "Boris Johnson Is a Fucking Cunt", reached No. 5. In 2021, their follow-up single, "Boris Johnson Is Still a Fucking Cunt", also reached No. 5. In 2022, their third song, "Fuck the Tories", reached No. 7. On all three occasions, the No. 1 went to the YouTuber LadBaby, who went on to become the record holder for the most Christmas No. 1s with the Beatles (as well as breaking the record for most consecutive Christmas No. 1s, previously held by the Beatles and the Spice Girls), with a series of charity singles involving sausage rolls raising money for the Trussell Trust. This has resulted in a rivalry between the two, with LadBaby saying that, "it takes a certain sort of person to download a song with that in the title". On 21 November 2023, LadBaby announced that they would not release a Christmas single in 2023. Kunt mockingly responded on social media saying that he was withdrawing from the race and supporting The Krackpots. On the same day, the Krackpots announced that "Proper Christmas" would be released on 8 December under the label Official Kulture. On 1 December, a video of the song was released featuring puppets performing the song.

"Proper Christmas" is performed to the same tune as "Fuck the Tories". Unlike the band's previous attempts at the Christmas No. 1, this song features no swearing, following on in the style of a single the band released earlier in 2023 as the Krown Jewelz entitled "Scrap the Monarchy".

In the first singles chart update beginning on 11 December 2023, "Proper Christmas" reached No. 37 in the chart, but it fell out of the top 100 in the official chart. However, it did reach No. 2 on the Official Singles Sales Chart, and No. 1 in the Official Singles Downloads Chart.

== Charts ==
Chart performance for "Proper Christmas"
Chart (2023)	Peak position
UK Indie (OCC)	30
