= Rock and Roll (Gary Glitter song) =

- Original 7-inch single

Single by Gary Glitter

from the album Glitter
- A-side: "Rock and Roll Part 1"
- B-side: "Rock and Roll Part 2"
- Released: 3 March 1972
- Recorded: 1971
- Genre: Glam rock
- Length: 3:04 (Part 1); 3:00 (Part 2)
- Label: Bell
- Songwriters: Gary Glitter; Mike Leander
- Producer: Mike Leander

Gary Glitter singles chronology
"Rock and Roll" (1972)	"I Didn't Know I Loved You (Till I Saw You Rock and Roll)" (1972)

"Rock and Roll" is a song by the English singer Gary Glitter, released in 1972 from his debut studio album, Glitter. Co-written by Glitter and Mike Leander, the song is in two parts: Part 1 is a vocal track with a "Rock and Roll, Rock" chorus and some verses reflecting on the history of the genre, while Part 2 is an instrumental piece aside from the regular exclamation of the word "Hey" in different tones as the only lyric.

"Rock and Roll" peaked at number two on the UK singles chart, staying at number two for three consecutive weeks and was kept off the number one spot by Donny Osmond's cover of "Puppy Love". In concert, Glitter often merged both parts of "Rock and Roll" into one performance.

"Rock and Roll" is Glitter's only top ten single in the United States. It was also in North America that "Rock and Roll Part 2" became popularly associated with sports, (especially in American football and Ice hockey), as a number of professional teams began to play the song during games to invigorate the audience. Since Glitter's convictions for child sex offences, the song's continued use has been controversial.

In the UK, "Rock and Roll" was one of over 25 hit singles for Glitter. In the US, the instrumental version (Part 2) attracted the vast majority of the attention; it hit No. 7 on the Billboard Hot 100. The running time of the US mono 45, which is mixed different from the LP, is 3:10 whilst it is 2:58 on the US LP.

In France, "Rock and Roll Part 1" was the more successful side, peaking at number one.

== Popular use ==
=== Sports ===
In North America, "Rock and Roll Part 2" became popularly associated with sports, as a number of professional teams adopted the song for use during games, primarily to signify scores and victories, or to otherwise invigorate the crowd. It is often referred to as "The Hey Song", as the only intelligible word in Part 2 is the exclamation of "Hey", punctuating the end of several instrumental phrases and repeated three times at the song's chorus. It was played first in a sport setting in 1974 at games for the Kalamazoo Wings of the high-minor International Hockey League by Kevin O'Brien, the team's public relations and marketing director. When he went to work for the NHL's Colorado Rockies in 1976, he brought the song with him. After the Rockies moved to New Jersey as the New Jersey Devils in 1982, the Denver Nuggets and Denver Broncos picked up the tradition and were the first NBA and NFL teams to play the song during games. At sporting events, fans often insert their own "Hey," or sometimes other chanted syllables (such as "you suck!"—which controversially led to a decision by the Devils to switch to a song by New Jersey-native Bon Jovi instead). The song was then later made famous as the win song played at Chicago Stadium and United Center for the 1990s Chicago Bulls dynasty led by Michael Jordan.

In 1999, Glitter was convicted of downloading child pornography in England, and in 2006 of child sexual abuse charges in Vietnam. After the second conviction was upheld in court, the NFL asked teams to stop playing the song. The NFL allowed a cover version of the song by the Tube Tops 2000 to be played, but in 2012, the NFL instructed teams to "avoid" the song following negative reaction from British media to the New England Patriots' use of the song. In 2014, Billboard reported that the song was slowly falling out of favour due to both the controversies, and teams electing to replace it with newer songs. Following the 2014-15 season, the NHL officially banned use of the song following the controversies, with the New Jersey Devils and San Jose Sharks (although the Sharks used an organ version) being the last two teams to use the song.

=== Film and television ===
The song was first used in 1988's Doctor Who as an adaptation "Doctorin' the Tardis" then in 1994's Mighty Ducks 2 and again in the 1996 Adam Sandler film Happy Gilmore.

In 2019, "Rock and Roll Part 2" appeared in Todd Phillips' film Joker as Arthur Fleck dances down a staircase, generating public controversy. Some sources indicated that Glitter, as co-writer of the song, would receive a lump sum and royalties for its use. According to the Los Angeles Times, Glitter does not receive payment when the song is used, as he has sold the rights, and the US rights to the song are now owned by Universal Music Publishing Group.

In the 2026 episode "Guinea Pig on a Stick" of the television series South Park, "Rock and Roll Part 2" is featured at the beginning with Eric Cartman also singing it to the tune of "sloppy joes".

== Chart performance ==
Chart (1972)	Peak position
Australia (Go-Set Top 40)	2
Belgium (Ultratop 50 Flanders)	4
Canadian RPM Top Singles	3
France (SNEP)	1 (Part 1); 9 (Part 2)
Irish Singles Chart	4
Netherlands (Dutch Top 40)	7
Netherlands (Single Top 100)	6
New Zealand (Listener)	8
Switzerland (Schweizer Hitparade)	4
UK (Official Charts Company)	2
U.S. Billboard Hot 100	7
West Germany (GfK)	4

== Cover versions ==
A cover version of Part 1, entitled 'Rock 'n' Roll', was recorded and released by British electronic music group The Human League and included on their EP Holiday '80 (1980). The group also performed the track on Top of the Pops in May 1980, although the single failed to make the Top 40. Another version of the Human League's recording makes a direct segue into a cover version of the Iggy Pop track "Nightclubbing".

Northern Ireland post-punk group The Undertones recorded "Rock n Roll" for their fourth BBC Radio 1 session for John Peel in January 1980. The track has its first official release in 2004.

Philadelphia post-punk band Executive Slacks released their version of part 2 (entitled "Rock 'n' Roll" or "Rock & Roll", depending on the release) as a 12" single in 1986, performed on electronic instruments, guitar and percussion.

Part 2 was heavily sampled in the Timelords' hit "Doctorin' the Tardis" with the lyrics changed to reflect Doctor Who and the TARDIS.

Part 2 was sampled on the song "Mas Tequila" by Sammy Hagar and The Waboritas, off the band's 1999 album Red Voodoo.

Part 2 was also sampled by Argentinian musician Gustavo Cerati in his song "Paseo Inmoral" from his album Bocanada (1999).

The song was a major influence for the 2011 song "Howlin' for You" by The Black Keys, with vocalist Dan Auerbach saying it was built around the drum beat from "Rock and Roll."

Part 2 is used as the tune for "Boris Johnson Is Still a Fucking Cunt" by the Kunts.
