= Mick's Tape =

Studio album by Cassetteboy
- Released: 2005
- Genre: Hip hop mashup
- Label: Antidote; Sanctuary

Cassetteboy chronology
The Parker Tapes (2002)	Mick's Tape (2005)

Professional ratings
Review scores
Source	Rating
AllMusic	3.5/5 stars

Mick's Tape is an album from UK group Cassetteboy.

== Overview ==
The album contains some mashup work by Cassetteboy, but also samples other tracks by various artists. Tracks by other artists include Squarepusher's "The Exploding Psychology", "Good Morning! How are you? Shut up!" by Ivor Cutler and "I Hear Voices" by MF Doom. Nearly all tracks not by Cassetteboy have been altered in some way, with the exception of "The Exploding Psychology". Several of the titles of the tracks allude to their contents, such as "Sirdy Bong", which is a Drum n' Bass remix of the "Birdy Song", and "The Formby Goes Out The Window" which samples George Formby's rendition of "Banjo Boy".

== Critical reception ==
BBC Music called the album a "generally entertaining and pretty risqué listening experience". The Independent wrote: "Thanks, then, to Cassetteboy for restoring the mix-tape to its more entertaining, inventive origins in hip-hop patchworks like Paul's Boutique and 3 Feet High and Rising''.

== Track listing ==
1. CassetteBoy: "Awaketh: The Queen"
2. CassetteBenders: "What We're Enjoying"
3. CassetteBoob: "This Woman Stinks!"
4. Ivor Cutler: "Good Morning! How Are You? Shut Up!"
5. CassetteBarber: "A Good Walk, Spoiled (Part 1)"
6. Jaylib: "Starz"
7. CassetteBrianMay: "The Formby Goes Out the Window"
8. Lyn Taitt & The Comets: "As a Human (Life Is Easy)"
9. Curtis Mayfield: "Trippin' Out"
10. CassetteBaby: "Cobblers"
11. MDK: "Breaking Down"
12. CassetteBoneyM: "Tube Boob"
13. BBC Radiophonic Workshop: "Tomorrow's World"
14. CassetteBothered: "C U in Court"
15. Lord Kitchener: "Love in the Cemetery"
16. CassetteBlooper: "The Blurb Donor"
17. MF Doom: "I Hear Voices"
18. CassetteBurglar: "Pint of Churchill's Please Treacle"
19. Happy Mondays: "Kuff Dam"
20. CassetteBedlamicBlokes: "German Frosties"
21. CassetteBobPinate: "WPC Maugham Elk Legs"
22. CassetteBellyUp: "Gopher"
23. Ipambelf: "The Shark Boy of Bora Bora"
24. CassetteBritney's Twisters: "A Good Walk Spoiled, Spoiled (Part 2)"
25. Ramsey Lewis: "Hang On Sloopy"
26. CassetteBobForApples: "Don Rathbone"
27. Hylda Baker & Arthur Mullard: "Get Back"
28. MC Cox: "OPT"
29. CassetteBaneOfTheirOwnLives: "Dogs Again Is It?"
30. CassetteButter: "Cock Boy"
31. Fela Kuti: "Water Get No Enemy"
32. CassetteBag: "I've Seen the Horses at Longleat"
33. Screaming Lord Sutch and the Savages: "Jack the Ripper"
34. CassetteBad: "What's Come Over You?"
35. CassetteBedKnobsAndBroomSticks: "Sirdy Bong"
36. Jehst: "Adventures In New Bohemia"
37. CassetteBexhill-On-Sea: "Jesus Christ"
38. CassetteBoringNow: "A Good Walk Spoiled, Spoiled 3"
39. Squarepusher: "The Exploding Psychology"
40. Cassettezzzzzzzz: "Hoes Down"
41. The Manor Boys: "Rich is Gay"
42. Fennesz: "Caecilia"
43. Shalamar: "Make That Move"
44. CassetteBye!: "What We're Enduring"
