= Portrait of Prince Frederick, Duke of York =

1816 painting by Thomas Lawrence

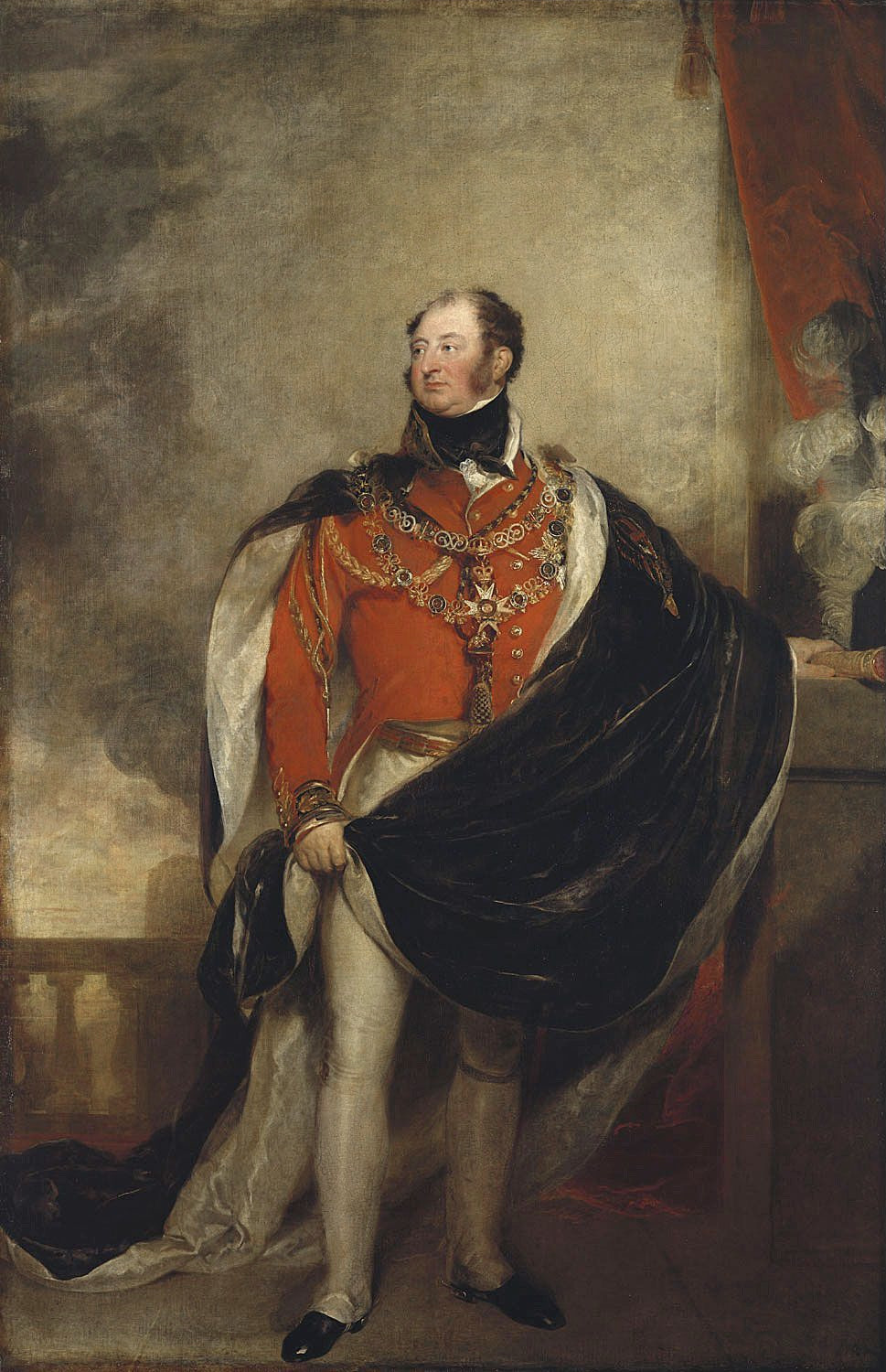
- Artist: Thomas Lawrence
- Year: 1816
- Medium: Oil on canvas
- Dimensions: 274.9 cm × 179.1 cm (108.2 in × 70.5 in)
- Location: Royal Collection; Windsor Castle

The Portrait of Prince Frederick, Duke of York, is a portrait painting of 1816 by the English artist Thomas Lawrence.

== History and description ==
It depicts Prince Frederick, Duke of York, the Commander in Chief of the British Army. A royal duke, he was the second son of George III and younger brother of the Prince Regent. From 1820 to his death in 1827 he was heir presumptive to the British throne.

The Duke of York joined the army at an early age. He was made Commander in Chief in his early thirties. He held the post from 1795 to 1809 and again from 1811 to 1827. He was forced to resign the command in 1809 due to accusations made by his former lover Mary Anne Clarke, but returned to the position two years later. Today he is perhaps best known for his association with the nursery rhyme The Grand Old Duke of York which reputedly refers to his unsuccessful military command during the Flanders Campaign, twenty years before the portrait was painted.

Lawrence was the leading portrait painter of the Regency era. He shows the Duke in a full-length view wearing the uniform of a Field Marshal. He displays the "star of the Garter and the collars of the Garter and Bath, holding across his body the mantle of the Garter with his Marshal's baton in his left hand". The work was exhibited at the Royal Academy's Summer Exhibition in 1816, one of three portraits of the Duke that Lawrence displayed there between 1814 and 1822. The portrait was commissioned by the Duke's elder brother the Prince Regent for four hundred guineas. Part of the Royal Collection, today it hangs in the Waterloo Chamber at Windsor Castle which commemorates those involved in the defeat of Napoleon.

== Bibliography ==
- Levey, Michael. Sir Thomas Lawrence. ISBN 0300109989. Yale University Press, 2005.
- Robinson, John Martin. Windsor Castle: Official Guidebook. ISBN 1902163346. Royal Collection, 2006.
- Smailes, Helen, Black, Peter & Stevenson, Lesley. Andrew Geddes, 1783–1844: Painter-printmaker: "A Man of Pure Taste". ISBN 1903278163. National Gallery of Scotland, 2001.
- Stephenson, Charles. The Admiral's Secret Weapon: Lord Dundonald and the Origins of Chemical Warfare. ISBN 1843832801. Boydell, 2006.
- Winterbottom, Derek. The Grand Old Duke of York: A Life of Prince Frederick, Duke of York and Albany 1763–1827. ISBN 1473845807. Pen and Sword, 2016.
