= Spymania =

Spymania is a British independent record label, which has released music by Squarepusher, Jamie Lidell, MDK, Si Begg, Wafta, Cassetteboy, Spandex, and Steven Taylor (Beckett & Taylor). Most recently, prominent artist Chronic (Owen Smith) has been offered a deal.

This label garnered a reputation as a breeding ground for underground artists such as Squarepusher and Jamie Lidell, who both went on to become well-established artists on the Warp Records roster.

One of the most popular Spymania releases was the Welcome To Celebrity Fog Donkey CD compilation, described in the NME as the "Finest release yet from the consistently astounding Spymania imprint."

Spymania would appear to be on indefinite hiatus, despite regular updates to the label website. Its artists are still active however, Barry's Bootlegs are releasing Cassetteboy albums and related projects on a regular basis, and Hand on the Plow continues to put out new music by Spandex and Beckett & Taylor. MDK released a new 12" on WeMe Records in 2007.
