= Scrap the Monarchy =

2023 single by the Krown Jewelz

Single by the Krown Jewelz
- Released: 5 May 2023
- Genre: Punk rock; comedy
- Length: 2:29
- Label: Pegging Prince

The Krown Jewelz singles chronology
"Fuck the Tories" (2022)	"Scrap the Monarchy" (2023)	"Bum the Runner" (2023)

Music video
- "Scrap the Monarchy" on YouTube

"Scrap the Monarchy" is a single by the Krown Jewelz, a band created by Kunt and the Gang, who had previously released songs as the Kunts. The song, aimed at the British monarchy, serves as a follow-up to the Kunts' 2022 single "Prince Andrew Is a Sweaty Nonce"; the track attacks Prince Andrew, Duke of York, William, Prince of Wales and King Charles III. The single was released on 5 May 2023, the day before King Charles III's coronation, reaching No. 9 in the UK Singles Chart and No. 1 in the UK Independent Singles Chart.

== History ==
The Krown Jewels previously released a series of tracks as The Kunts, which entered the UK Singles Chart despite little mainstream press coverage and no radio airtime. Three previous songs attacking the Government of the United Kingdom and the Conservative Party: "Boris Johnson Is a Fucking Cunt", "Boris Johnson Is Still a Fucking Cunt" and "Fuck the Tories" reached the top ten in the singles charts. In 2022, the band released "Prince Andrew Is a Sweaty Nonce" during the week of the Platinum Jubilee of Elizabeth II, which reached No. 20 in the UK Singles Chart, and No. 1 in the UK Independent Singles Chart.

On 6 April 2023, the band announced the details of "Scrap the Monarchy" and revealed that it would be released on 5 May 2023, the day before Charles III's coronation. They also revealed the lyrics to the track which, unlike their previous songs, contain no major swearing in order that it could be covered by the press, played on the radio, and announced on BBC Radio 1's chart shows. The song makes references to Charles III's relationship with paedophile Jimmy Savile and Prince Andrew's involvement in the Jeffrey Epstein scandal, as well as claiming that Prince William is guilty of virtue signalling. The announcement also listed details of a music video featuring the band dressed as guardsmen, the band with their heads on spikes, and a look-alike of Charles III featuring saveloy sausages for fingers; this move likely serves to make a mockery of the King's 'sausage fingers', as are the contrasting, abnormally thick hands on the cover.

On Kunt's blog, a campaign was launched to get members of the public to record their own lyrics to the music, with nine to be selected for release as downloads. Eventually 30 versions were released of the song's launch. To promote the song, Kunt created an artwork entitled "A Waste Of Money", which consisted of 100 fake £10 banknotes featuring the King, which Kunt wiped his bottom with.

In the first chart update, the song reached No. 17 in the singles chart. When this was announced on The Official Chart: First Look On Radio 1, presenters Vick Hope and Katie Thistleton named the Krown Jewelz, but did not name the song. The song, however, was named on The Official Chart on Radio 1, but not played. It reached No. 9 in the Singles Chart and No. 1 in the Independent Singles Chart. The song was the highest new entry the week it released, selling 22,870 copies.

== Charts ==
Chart performance for "Scrap the Monarchy"
Chart (2023)	Peak position
UK Singles (OCC)	9
UK Indie (OCC)	1

== See also ==
- Republicanism in the United Kingdom
