= Tory scum =

Political phrase in the United Kingdom

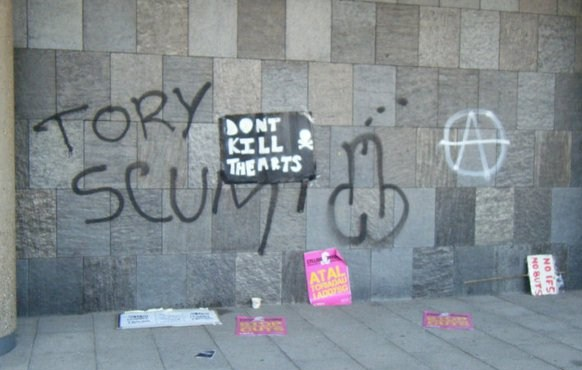
Anti-Conservative graffiti — the words "Tory scum" next to a penis graffiti. A spray-painted circle-A graffiti can also be seen, along with a poster displaying a skull and crossbones — created during the 2010 student protests.

Tory scum is a phrase used to describe members of the United Kingdom's Conservative Party ("Tory" is a colloquial name for the Conservatives) by its opponents. Journalist Michael White called the phrase a regularly used "ancient British roar"; David Graeber, a "familiar slogan"; and Fintan O'Toole joked that in some parts of England the phrase was thought to be the actual name of the Conservative Party.

In November 2023 the High Court in England ruled that it was "reasonable" for two protesters to have called Iain Duncan Smith “Tory scum” at the 2021 Conservative Party Conference. The protestors had been acquitted the year before of using threatening, abusive or insulting words or behaviour with intent, and the High Court found that "the use of Tory scum was to highlight the policies" of Mr Duncan Smith, contributing to the "reasonableness of the conduct".

Conservative politician Jacob Rees-Mogg, at his party's conference in Birmingham in 2021, said he didn't mind people calling him "Tory scum", adding, "That's rather marvellous, having a democracy where you can walk through the streets and people can exercise their rights to peaceful protest".

== Use in the United States ==
Since at least the time of the American War of Independence from Britain, Americans referred to those loyal to the British crown – known as Loyalists or Tories — as "Tory scum". After the revolutionary war, the phrase could also be directed at Americans considered disloyal to the United States.

== Gallery ==
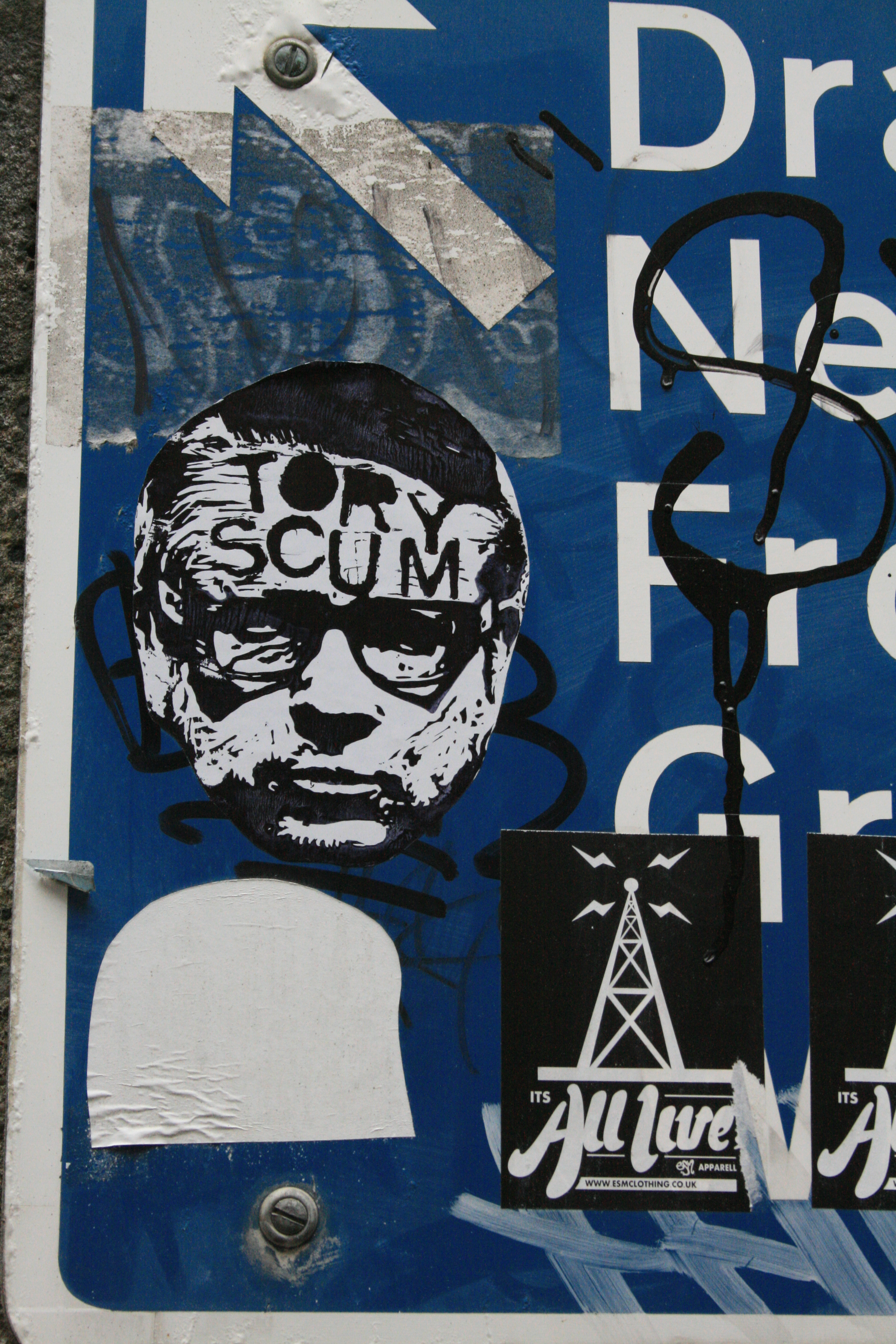
Sticker of Conservative politician Michael Gove with "Tory scum" written on his forehead

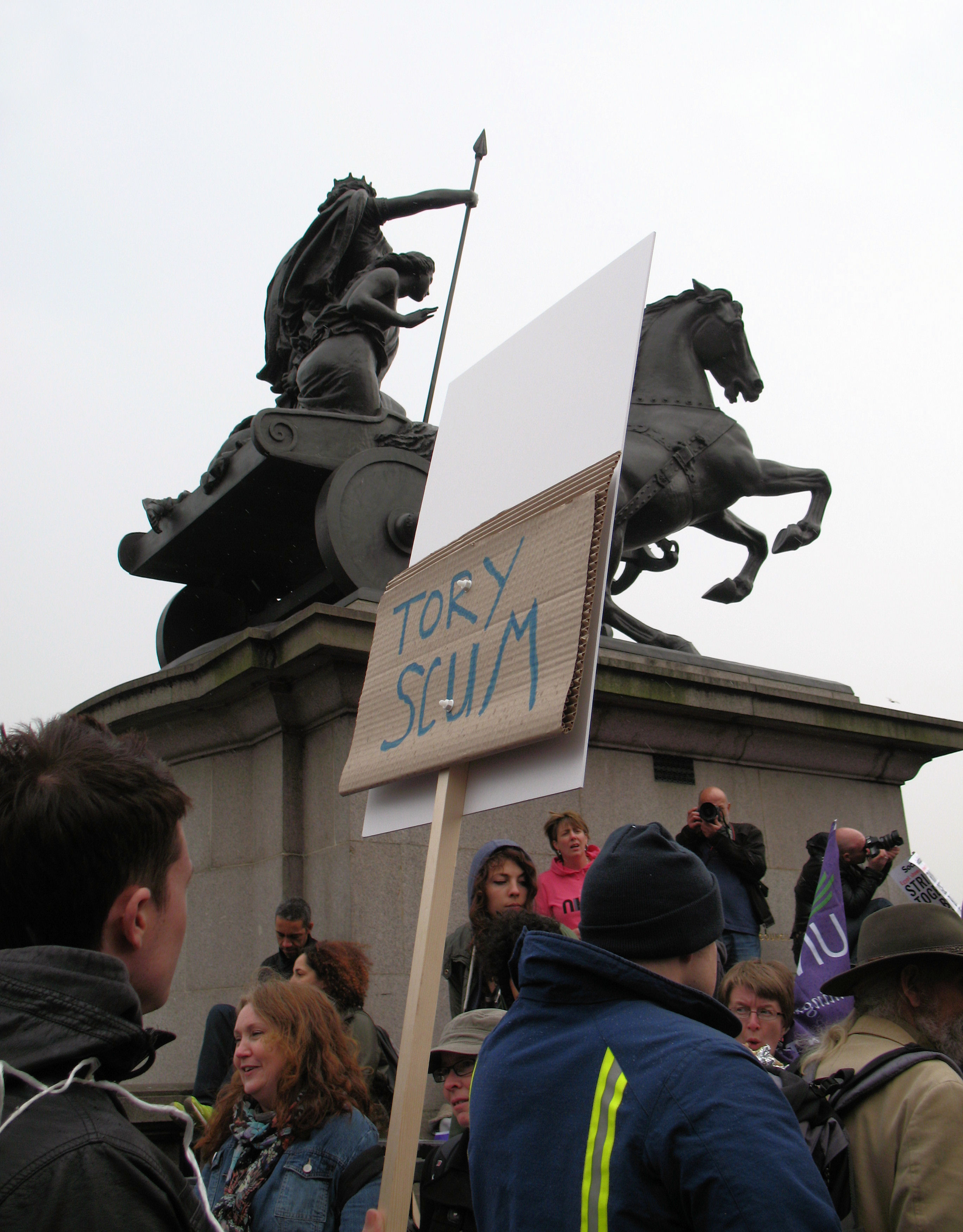
"Tory scum" protest placard in a march as it passes the statue of Boadicea and Her Daughters in London

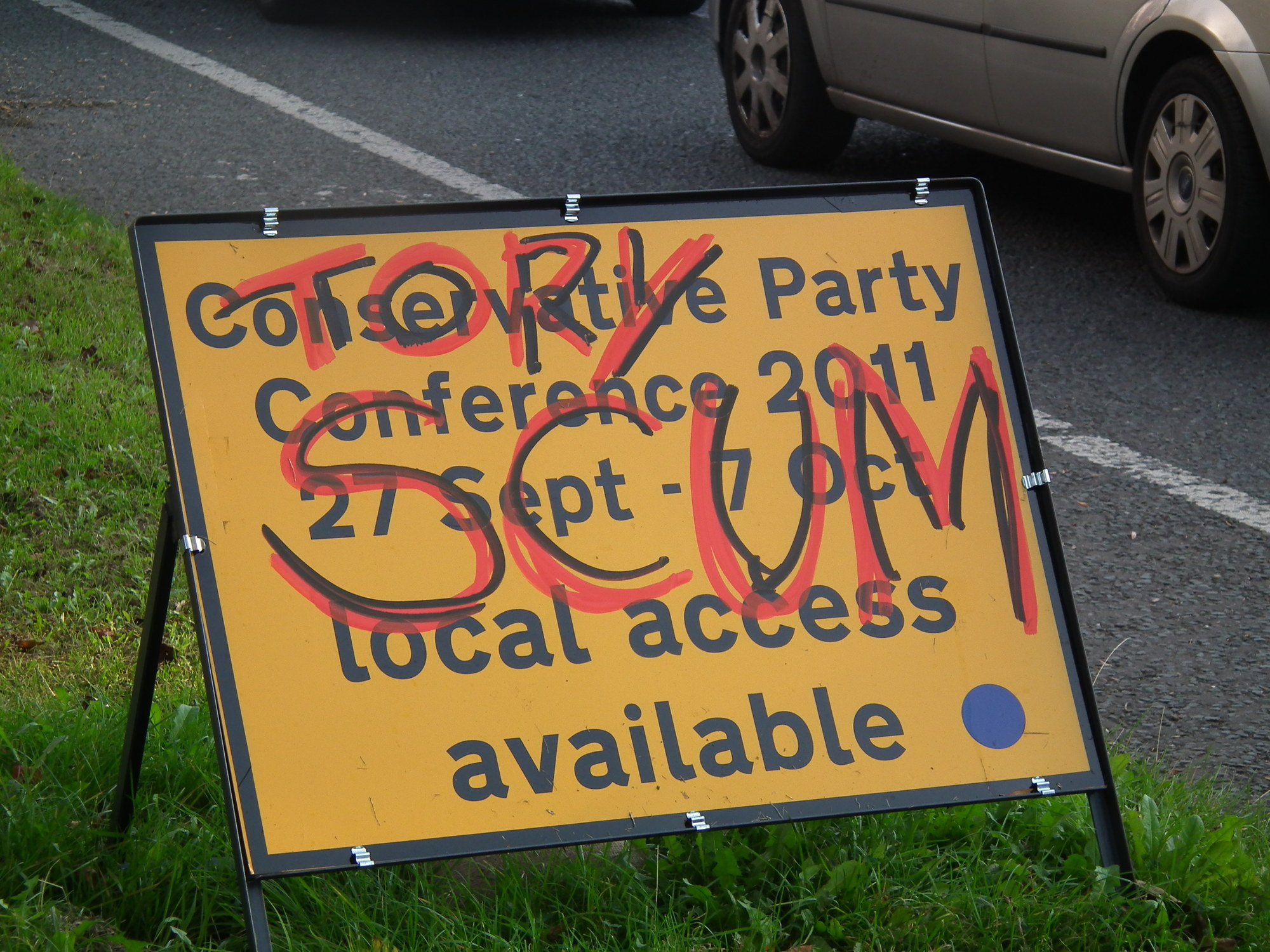
"Tory scum" graffitied over a road sign about the Conservative Party Conference

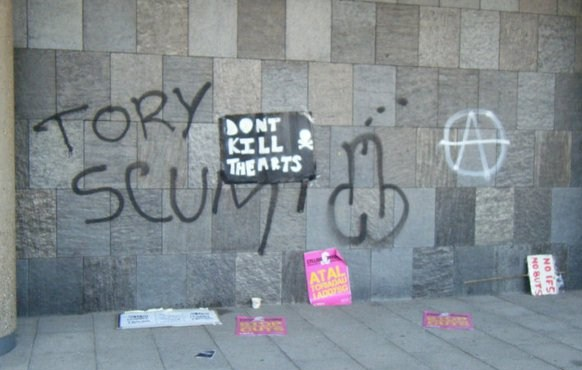
"Tory scum" graffitied on a wall of 30 Millbank (then home to Conservative Campaign Headquarters) during the 2010 student protests in London

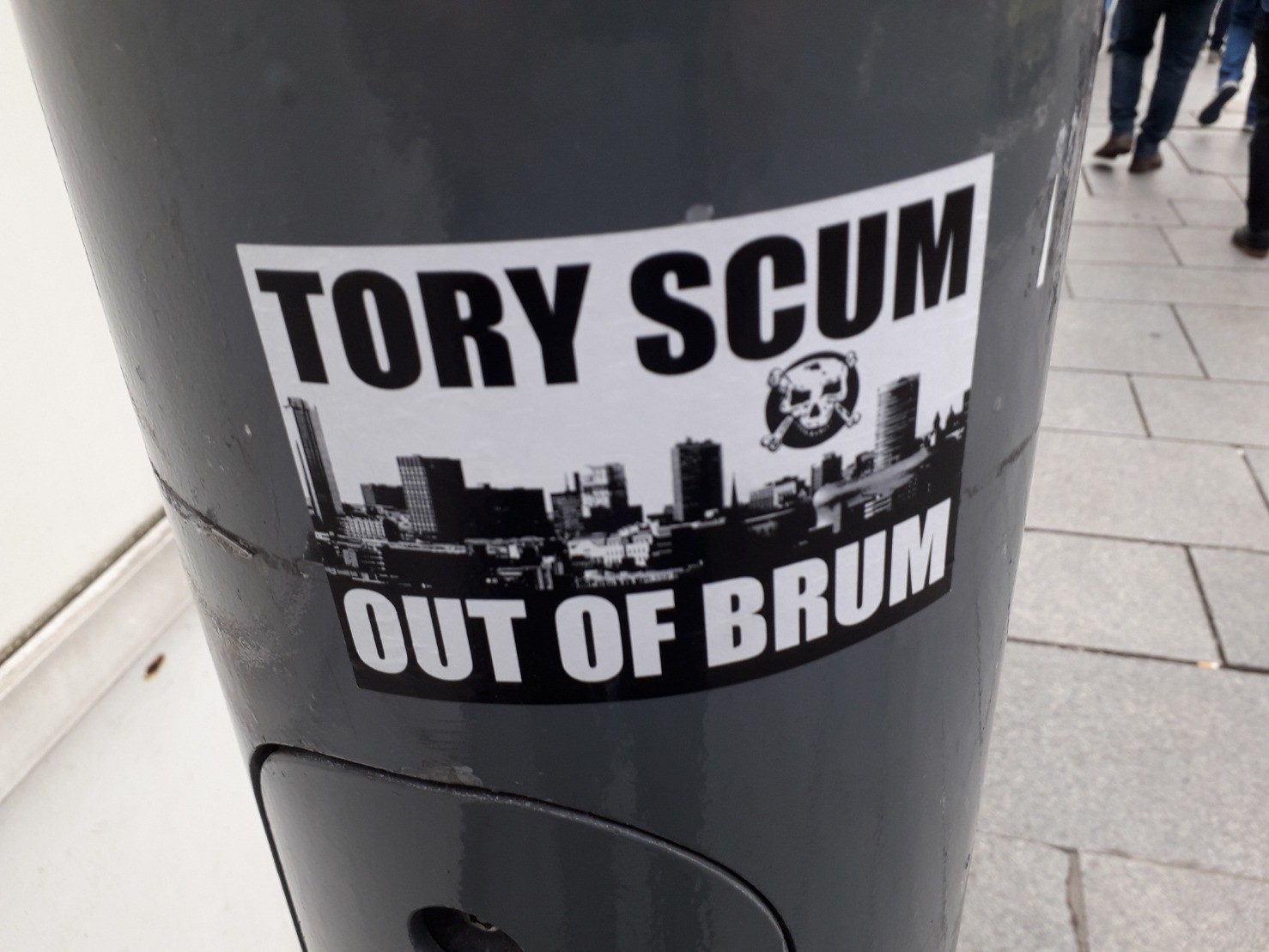
Sticker, stuck to a lamp post in Birmingham, displaying the words "Tory scum out of Brum"

== See also ==
- Fuck the Tories
