= Movin' to the Sun =

Single by Hugel and Ultra Naté

from the album Twenty One
- Released: 22 May 2026
- Genre: House
- Length: 2:22
- Label: Make the Girls Dance
- Songwriters: Florent Hugel; Imael Angel; Loris Cimino; Maximilian Riehl
- Producers: Hugel; Late Nine; Maximilian Riehl; Loris Cimino

Hugel singles chronology
"Tarde" (2026)	"Movin' to the Sun" (2026)	"Ron Y Coco" (2026)

Ultra Naté singles chronology
"Push the Vibe" (2026)	"Movin' to the Sun" (2026)	"Restless" (2026)

"Movin' to the Sun" is a song by French producer Hugel and American singer Ultra Naté, released by Make the Girls Dance Records on 22 May 2026, and is from Hugel's debut studio album Twenty One. The house track was produced by Hugel and Late Nine, and was written by Hugel, Loris Cimino and Maximilian Riehl, with Imael Angel receiving writing credits for the song's concept.

== Background and release ==
Hugel spoke to British radio station Capital Dance about the songwriting process, which began with Imael Angel, who used AI to write the song. The French producer used this AI-generated track as a basis for a new version recreated by himself from scratch, contacting his long-standing friend and collaborator Naté, who loved the idea and recorded her vocals. Hugel described the track as his fastest-growing record, which in a few weeks has become the fourth most Shazamed song of the moment. In addition, it reached the number one position on the Beatport chart.

Premiered at Hugel's Coachella set, it was released as the lead single of his debut studio album Twenty One. The song's title gave its name to the summer 2026 tour, organised as part of the album's promotional campaign. The release of the song and the announcement of the album were seen as a turning point in Hugel's career, moving away from the traditional structures of the electronic dance music scene for a more organic and atmospheric sound.

== Composition ==
A house song with influences of tech house, it marks the second collaboration between Hugel and Naté, the French producer having already remixed Naté's 1997 song "Free". It was described as powerful, sunny and suitable for summer, with the energetic and festive sounds for which Hugel is known. The production has been described as bold and experimental for Hugel, with its minimalist aesthetic and syncopated vocals that depart from traditional song structures. The lyrics have been described as rich in imagery, expressing a quest for warmth, both literally and figuratively.

Hugel saw the collaboration as a bridge between generations. It was described as a fusion between two styles of house music, blending Naté's traditional house with Hugel's contemporary Afro house and Latin house sounds. The song incorporates Hugel's groove and club-oriented structure, Angel's modern vocal part and Naté's voice reminiscing the key moments in house music. In an interview for French radio station Radio FG, Hugel said that choosing Naté as a collaborator rather than a pop artist made all the difference for this kind of release, helping to revive the spirit of house music of that era.

== Personnel ==
- Hugel – composition, lyrics, production, keyboards, programming
- Late Nine, Maximilian Riehl, Loris Cimino – composition, lyrics, production, keyboards, programming
- Imael Angel – composition, lyrics
- Ultra Naté – vocals
- Jada Givenchy – recording engineering
- Joel Woolfenden – mastering engineering
- John "J-C" Carr – recording engineering

== Charts ==
=== Weekly charts ===
Weekly chart performance
Chart (2026)	Peak position
Argentina Anglo Airplay (Monitor Latino)	12
Australia (ARIA)	21
Australia Airplay (RCS)	1
Australia Dance (ARIA)	1
Austria (Ö3 Austria Top 40)	2
Austria Airplay (MusicTrace)	16
Belarus Airplay (TopHit)	1
Belgium (Ultratop 50 Flanders)	14
Belgium (Ultratop 50 Wallonia)	4
Bolivia Anglo Airplay (Monitor Latino)	10
Bulgaria Airplay (PROPHON)	1
Canada Hot 100 (Billboard)	42
Canada CHR/Top 40 (Billboard)	36
Central America Anglo Airplay (Monitor Latino)	10
Chile Airplay (Monitor Latino)	8
Colombia Anglo Airplay (Monitor Latino)	4
CIS Airplay (TopHit)	1
Croatia International Airplay (Top lista)	6
Czech Republic Airplay (ČNS IFPI)	3
Czech Republic Singles Digital (ČNS IFPI)	21
Dominican Republic Anglo Airplay (Monitor Latino)	12
Ecuador Anglo Airplay (Monitor Latino)	5
El Salvador Airplay (ASAP EGC)	5
Estonia Airplay (TopHit)	2
France (SNEP)	23
France Airplay (SNEP)	11
Germany (GfK)	2
Germany Airplay (MusicTrace)	8
Germany Dance (GfK)	1
Global 200 (Billboard)	27
Global Dance Radio (Billboard/WARM)	2
Greece International (IFPI)	4
Guatemala Anglo Airplay (Monitor Latino)	17
Honduras Anglo Airplay (Monitor Latino)	3
Hungary (Dance Top 40)	1
Hungary (Editors' Choice Top 40)	9
Hungary (Single Top 40)	12
Ireland (IRMA)	14
Italy (FIMI)	5
Italy Airplay (EarOne)	4
Kazakhstan Airplay (TopHit)	9
Latin America Anglo Airplay (Monitor Latino)	4
Latvia Airplay (LaIPA)	1
Latvia Streaming (LaIPA)	2
Lebanon (Lebanese Top 20)	3
Lithuania (AGATA)	5
Lithuania Airplay (TopHit)	1
Luxembourg (Billboard)	4
Malta Airplay (Radiomonitor)	7
Mexico Anglo Airplay (Monitor Latino)	2
Moldova Airplay (TopHit)	6
Netherlands (Dutch Top 40)	19
Netherlands (Single Top 100)	16
New Zealand (Recorded Music NZ)	18
New Zealand Airplay (RCS)	16
North Macedonia Airplay (Radiomonitor)	1
Norway (VG-lista)	26
Panama Airplay (Monitor Latino)	17
Paraguay Airplay (Monitor Latino)	17
Peru Anglo Airplay (Monitor Latino)	2
Poland Airplay (OLiS)	17
Poland Streaming (OLiS)	24
Portugal (AFP)	19
Portugal Airplay (AFP)	13
Puerto Rico Anglo Airplay (Monitor Latino)	14
Romania (Billboard)	21
Romania Airplay (UPFR)	1
Romania Airplay (Media Forest)	2
Romania TV Airplay (Media Forest)	19
Russia Airplay (TopHit)	1
Russia Streaming (TopHit)	27
San Marino Airplay (SMRTV Top 50)	1
Serbia Airplay (Radiomonitor)	6
Slovakia Airplay (ČNS IFPI)	10
Slovakia Singles Digital (ČNS IFPI)	4
Slovenia Airplay (Radiomonitor)	10
Spain Airplay (Promusicae)	45
South Africa Airplay (TOSAC)	17
Spain (Promusicae)	65
Sweden (Sverigetopplistan)	26
Sweden Dance (Sverigetopplistan)	2
Switzerland (Schweizer Hitparade)	2
Turkey International Airplay (Radiomonitor Türkiye)	3
Ukraine Airplay (TopHit)	1
UK Singles (Official Charts)	2
UK Dance (Official Charts)	1
UK Independent (Official Charts)	1
Uruguay Airplay (Monitor Latino)	6
US Dance Airplay (Billboard)	1
US Digital Song Sales (Billboard)	13
US Hot Dance/Electronic Songs (Billboard)	6
Venezuela Airplay (Monitor Latino)	19

=== Monthly charts ===
Monthly chart performance
Chart (2026)	Peak position
Belarus Airplay (TopHit)	3
CIS Airplay (TopHit)	1
Estonia Airplay (TopHit)	2
Kazakhstan Airplay (TopHit)	9
Latvia Airplay (TopHit)	2
Lithuania Airplay (TopHit)	1
Moldova Airplay (TopHit)	8
Romania Airplay (TopHit)	2
Russia Airplay (TopHit)	1
Russia Streaming (TopHit)	30
Ukraine Airplay (TopHit)	13

== Certifications ==
Certifications for "Movin' to the Sun"
Region	Certification	Certified units/sales
France (SNEP)	Gold	100,000^{‡}
Italy (FIMI)	Gold	100,000^{‡}
New Zealand (RMNZ)	Gold	15,000^{‡}
United Kingdom (BPI)	Gold	400,000^{‡}
Streaming
Czech Republic (ČNS IFPI)	Gold	2,500,000^{†}
Greece (IFPI Greece)	Gold	1,000,000^{†}
Slovakia (ČNS IFPI)	Platinum	1,700,000^{†}
^{‡} Sales+streaming figures based on certification alone.^{†} Streaming-only figures based on certification alone.

== Release history ==
Release dates and formats for "Movin' to the Sun"
Region	Date	Format	Label	Ref.
Various	22 May 2026	Digital download; streaming	Make the Girls Dance	
Italy	22 May 2026	Radio airplay	Make the Girls Dance	
