= Kunt and the Gang =

British musical comedian

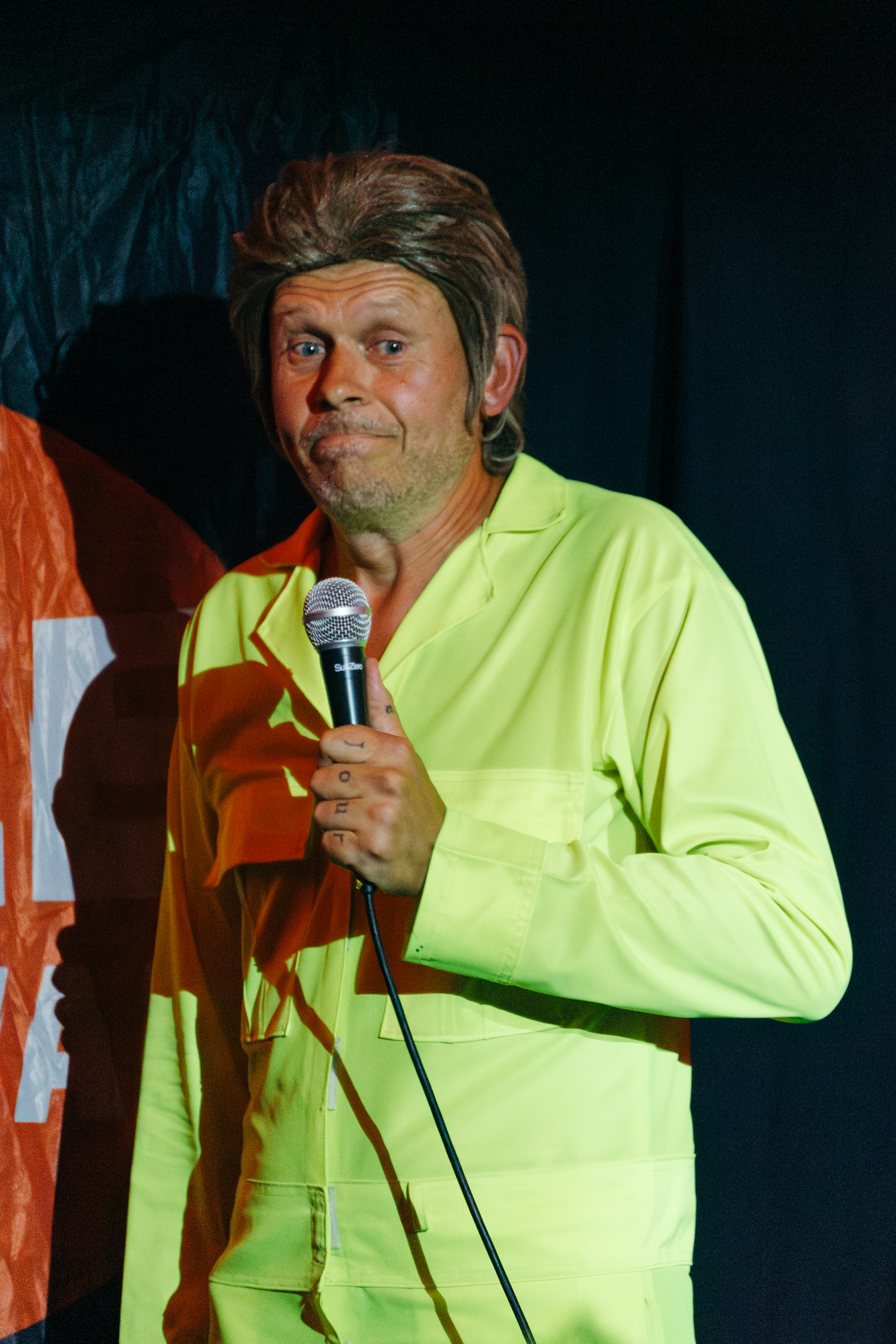
- Kunt performing at the 2025 Edinburgh Festival Fringe

Background information
- Also known as: The Kunts, Kunt and the Gang Presents, Little Kunt, Mr. Tuppence, Künt, The Krown Jewelz, The Krackpots
- Born: Wayne Clements; 1973 (age 52–53)
- Origin: Basildon, Essex, England
- Genres: Synth-pop; comedy; novelty; punk rock
- Years active: 2003–2016, 2019–present
- Labels: Disco Minge, Direct Action, Radical Rudeness
- Members: Kunt; Little Kunt (hand puppet); Rubber Jonny (as the Kunts); Fucksticks (as the Kunts); Carsehole (as the Kunts)
- Past members: Skidmark (as the Kunts)
- Website: kuntandthegang.co.uk

Kunt and the Gang is a British dark musical comedy act from Basildon, Essex. Despite the "and the Gang" in the stage name (a reference to the American funk band Kool & the Gang), the act comprises a single performer: Wayne Clements, a comedian and singer-songwriter.

Clements is also known for founding the spin-off project the Kunts, who have had four top-twenty hits on the UK Singles Chart including the controversial track "Boris Johnson Is a Fucking Cunt" and its follow-up "Boris Johnson Is Still a Fucking Cunt", which reached number five for Christmas 2020 and 2021 respectively. These were followed by "Prince Andrew Is a Sweaty Nonce" (no. 20) and "Fuck the Tories" (no. 7). A fifth hit, "Scrap the Monarchy" was released as "the Krown Jewelz" and reached number nine.

Kunt and the Gang has also released music under the pseudonym of his hand puppet sidekick, Little Kunt, and the moniker of Kunt and the Gang Presents (for Shannon Matthews: The Musical, a comedy musical based on the faked kidnapping of Yorkshire girl Shannon Matthews).

Kunt and the Gang rose to prominence making crude synthpop songs related to sexual intercourse and controversial public figures, including paedophiles Jimmy Savile and Rolf Harris, and was initially active from 2003 to 2016. In 2010, Clements first achieved chart success when his single "Use My Arsehole as a Cunt (The Nick Clegg Story)" reached number No. 66 on the UK Singles Chart at Christmas time. The following year, another single, "Fucksticks (Royal Wedding Souvenir Version)", also entered the same chart, this time at number No. 63.

He released ten studio albums before retiring his main act in 2016, and published an autobiography, iKunt, in December 2018. He then came out of retirement in 2020, streaming during the COVID-19 pandemic, which ultimately led to his first unlikely chart success later in the year.

== History ==
Kunt and the Gang's live show initially generated popularity through numerous years playing at pubs and smaller venues, and building a niche audience. He would then make content for early social networking platforms, predominately MySpace and then YouTube; and proclaimed himself a "minor internet hit singer".

Kunt and the Gang's early work is best known for its simple electronic production and controversial lyrical content, dealing with such taboo subjects as masturbation and sexual fantasies. Kunt and the Gang's later work took a darker turn, following the Operation Yewtree police investigation into the crimes of prolific paedophile Jimmy Savile, often touching on the subject of paedophilia and featured several ironic tributes to both Savile and Rolf Harris, alongside Ian Watkins.

Until 2008, when his touring schedule became too intense, he was a council worker in Basildon. His early musical efforts included a comedy punk band called Serious Problem and a synth-pop duo Pubic Cube. In the year prior to forming Kunt and the Gang, under the name Wayne Clements, he co-wrote and produced a number of songs for The Glambassador, an album by DJ and alternative scenester Boogaloo Stu, and also wrote and produced synth-pop albums under the guise of Mister Midi and Macondo. He also put together a compilation of contemporary electronic pop music, Robopop: Volume I.

=== The Kunts ===
In December 2020, Kunt, performing with his newly formed punk band, The Kunts, joined the race for the Christmas number one single again, with a short song about Prime Minister Boris Johnson called "Boris Johnson Is a Fucking Cunt". Its rivals in the 2020 race were "Don't Stop Me Eatin'" by LadBaby (a parody cover of "Don't Stop Believin'" by Journey, which also featured Ronan Keating on some versions), Russ Abbot's "Atmosphere", former chart toppers Justin Bieber and The Lewisham & Greenwich NHS Choir (teaming up for a version of Bieber's "Holy"), Liam Gallagher's "All You're Dreaming Of" and Ed Sheeran's "Afterglow". The band were backed in the race by Black Mirror's Charlie Brooker, as well as Glen Matlock of the Sex Pistols and like LadBaby, also released additional versions of the song, including a censored sausage roll based version.

The song about Boris Johnson was revealed on BBC Radio 1 by Vick Hope and Katie Thistleton on 20 December 2020. During the show, the presenters did not mention the song's title or play it on air because of the offensive language in it, stating: "Now at 19 we've got a track about Boris Johnson that has so many bad words in it we can't play it on daytime Radio 1." The record was a new entry at number 19, with LadBaby at number 1, climbing to number 8 the next day. On 23 December 2020, it was reported that a number of bookmakers had put odds on the record being the Christmas number one at 8/1, after it had become the second most downloaded song on iTunes and Amazon. The song ultimately reached number 5 on the Christmas chart, after accumulating 45,119 sales, and unlike many of the other Christmas campaign singles (such as rivals LadBaby) made the Official Audio Streaming Chart as well.

In November 2021, the Kunts launched an online campaign to get their single "Boris Johnson Is Still a Fucking Cunt" to Christmas number one. The song was released on 17 December 2021. The song reached number 5 in the Christmas midweek chart. During this campaign the band made numerous references to similarly subversive act the KLF, including in the music video (based, along with the song, on "Doctorin' the Tardis") and in promotional imagery, which shows Kunt and the band reading The Manual, a book written by The KLF as "the Timelords". Similarly to their previous hit, The Kunts song for 2021 had several different versions, many of which were remixed by guest artists such as Cassetteboy and B3ta founder Rob Manuel. Again the song had a radio-friendly versions with no foul language, substituting the phrase "sausage roll" for "fucking cunt." It is believed this is made in reference to LadBaby, who have had three previous number one Christmas singles based around sausage rolls. While the 2020 single had 23 different mixes, the release for 2021 has scaled this back to 13. The song reached number 5 in the Christmas chart.

On 27 May 2022, to coincide with the Platinum Jubilee of Queen Elizabeth II The Kunts released "Prince Andrew Is a Sweaty Nonce", with the aim of matching the Sex Pistols' achievement of getting a protest song about the British royal family to number two in the Jubilee charts. It peaked at number 20.

On 16 December 2022, the Kunts returned with "Fuck the Tories" in a third attempt to claim the Christmas number-one; the song ranked seventh in the chart.

On 5 May 2023, the Kunts released "Scrap The Monarchy" under the name of the Krown Jewelz. The song reached number 9 in the singles chart.

Another Christmas number-one attempt was released on 8 December 2023, titled "Proper Christmas", and released under the name "The Krackpots". The song missed the top 100 of the official chart, but did chart at number 2 on the Official Singles Sales Chart.

=== Shannon Matthews: The Musical ===
Theatre troupe Tuppence Ha'penny performed Shannon Matthews: The Musical (based on the 2010 album) at the 2022 Edinburgh Festival Fringe. In September 2022, a film version was crowdfunded via Kickstarter. The funding goal was reached within 24 hours. The film was released in 2024.

=== Murder-on-Thames ===
Kunt launched another Kickstarter in October 2026, this time for a satirical true-crime documentary called Murder-on-Thames.

== Discography ==
=== Albums ===
List of albums
Year	Title
2004	I Have a Little Wank and I Have a Little Cry
2007	I Have Another Wank and I Have Another Cry
2008	One Last Wank and One Last Cry
2010	Kunt and the Gang Presents Shannon Matthews: The Musical
2011	Hurry Up and Suck Me Off Before I Get Famous
2011	Kiss You Under the Cameltoe (The Christmas Singles)
2013	Kuntrarian (Little Kunt's Solo Album)
2014	Japs iTunes
2016	Blue ROFL
2019	Bite Ô Ma Bite
2020	Kunts Punk in Your Face (as The Kunts)
2021	Korona Klub Klassics Volume 1
2024	Shannon Matthews: The Musical...The Movie: The Official Soundtrack
2026	It's All A Load of Bollocks and They're All Just Cunts (as The Kunts)

=== Compilation albums ===
List of compilations
Year	Title
2009	Here's One I Knocked Out Earlier
2010	Complete Kunt: The Greatest Minor Internet Hits of Kunt and the Gang
2012	Sloppy Seconds: More Titbits from the Kunt Archives
2013	Fresh Kunt (download only Greatest Hits)
2015	Kunt'll Fix It (a mixture of greatest hits and new songs)
2021	NSFW: The Very Worst of Kunt and the Gang & The Kunts

=== Charted singles ===
List of charted singles
Year	Artist	Single	UK	UK Indie	UK Indie Breakers
2010	Kunt and the Gang	"Use My Arsehole as a Cunt (The Nick Clegg Story)"	66	8	2
2011	Kunt and the Gang	"Fucksticks (Royal Wedding Souvenir Version)"	63	10	3
2020	The Kunts	"Boris Johnson Is a Fucking Cunt"	5	3	—N/a
2021	The Kunts	"Boris Johnson Is Still a Fucking Cunt"	5	2	—N/a
2022	The Kunts	"Prince Andrew Is a Sweaty Nonce"	20	1	—N/a
2022	The Kunts	"Fuck the Tories"	7	4	—N/a
2023	The Krown Jewelz	"Scrap the Monarchy"	9	1	—N/a
2023	The Krackpots	"Proper Christmas"	—N/a	30	6

=== Other songs ===
List of other songs
Year	Title
2004	"Santa's Sack"
2006	"Fucksticks" (First Release)
2006	"This Christmas"
2007	"All I Want For Christmas is You (To Bring Me Off)"
2008	"Jesus (Baby With a Beard)"
2008	”Perverts on the Internet”
2008	"Men with Beards (What Are They Hiding?)"
2009	"I Sucked Off a Bloke: 2 New Songs Tour Souvenir"
2009	"Kuntish Christmas"
2011	"Jesus (Baby With a Beard)" (reissue)
2011	”Jimmy Savile and the Sexy Kids”
2014	"The Wrong Ian Watkins"
2014	”That’s Why I’m Voting UKIP”
2022	"Fuck Off Boris You Cunt" [The Kunts]
2023	"Rishi Sunak is a Rat-Faced Cunt" [The Kunts]
2023	"Rolf Harris and the Sexy Kids"
2023	"Bum the Runner" [The Kunts]
2025	"Is the Pope Gonna Croak?"
