= Prince Andrew Is a Sweaty Nonce =

2022 song by the Kunts

Single by the Kunts
- Released: 27 May 2022
- Genre: Punk rock
- Length: 1:46
- Label: Radical Rudeness

The Kunts singles chronology
"Boris Johnson Is Still a Fucking Cunt" (2021)	"Prince Andrew Is a Sweaty Nonce" (2022)	"Fuck Off Boris You Cunt" (2022)

Music video
- "Prince Andrew Is a Sweaty Nonce" on YouTube

"Prince Andrew Is a Sweaty Nonce" is a 2022 punk rock single by the Kunts, a band created by the dark comedy singer Kunt and the Gang. The song is directed at Prince Andrew, Duke of York (later Andrew Mountbatten-Windsor), and references his relationship with convicted child sex offender Jeffrey Epstein; the word "nonce" is British prison slang referring to child sexual abusers or, more generally, paedophiles. The song reached No. 20 in the UK Singles Chart, and No. 1 in the UK Independent Singles Chart and UK Singles Sales Chart. The song is a follow-up to the band's previous tracks "Boris Johnson Is a Fucking Cunt" from 2020, and "Boris Johnson Is Still a Fucking Cunt" from 2021.

== History ==
In May 2022, Kunt announced in a newsletter that the Kunts would release "Prince Andrew Is a Sweaty Nonce" on 27 May, to coincide with the charts at the time of the Platinum Jubilee of Elizabeth II on 3 June. As with the previous chart attempts, multiple versions of the song and 24-hour streams were released. Versions have been made by Ricardo Autobahn and Rob Manuel. The tracks were released by the band's independent Radical Rudeness label. In the newsletter, Kunt said that the song was: "our attempt for the Jubilee chart Number 2 (let's face it, even if we did sell enough they'd never let it be Number 1 anyway!)" This references the Sex Pistols song "God Save the Queen", which reached No. 2 in the UK Singles Chart during Elizabeth II's Silver Jubilee (1977), leading to claims that the song was deliberately kept off No. 1. In a press note, Kunt said the single was intended to reopen the conversation around Prince Andrew at a time the establishment wanted to hide it, and in particular Prince Andrew's relationships with Jeffrey Epstein and Virginia Giuffre.

The song's lyrics and promotion exploit the poorly received 2019 Newsnight interview in which Prince Andrew alleged an inability to sweat to rebut one accusation and a trip to PizzaExpress in Woking as an alibi for another. It also refers to Andrew's out-of-court settlement of Giuffre's lawsuit, for an undisclosed amount reported at £12 million by some news sources.

The song features a satirical reworking of the nursery rhyme "The Grand Old Duke of York", which includes the following lyrics:

The grand old Duke of York
He said he didn't sweat
So why did he pay 12 million quid
To a girl he'd never met?

A video for the song was to be released on Kunt's YouTube channel on 20 May, but on 19 May the channel was taken down before he was able to post it. Within half-an-hour he appealed, but this was turned down. Kunt criticised the channel's removal saying it was "most unusual" for it to be taken down the day before the video's debut. He also said it was annoying that unlike "Boris Johnson Is a Fucking Cunt", which was not played on radio due to the swearing, "Prince Andrew Is a Sweaty Nonce" has no swearing, and the only explicit content is at the end when a man playing Prince Andrew has his naked buttocks censored by a PizzaExpress logo (though with the words "Pizza Express" replaced by "Sweaty Nonce"). He thus encouraged his followers to download the video from the song's website princeandrew.info and post it on as many YouTube channels as possible.

== Promotion ==
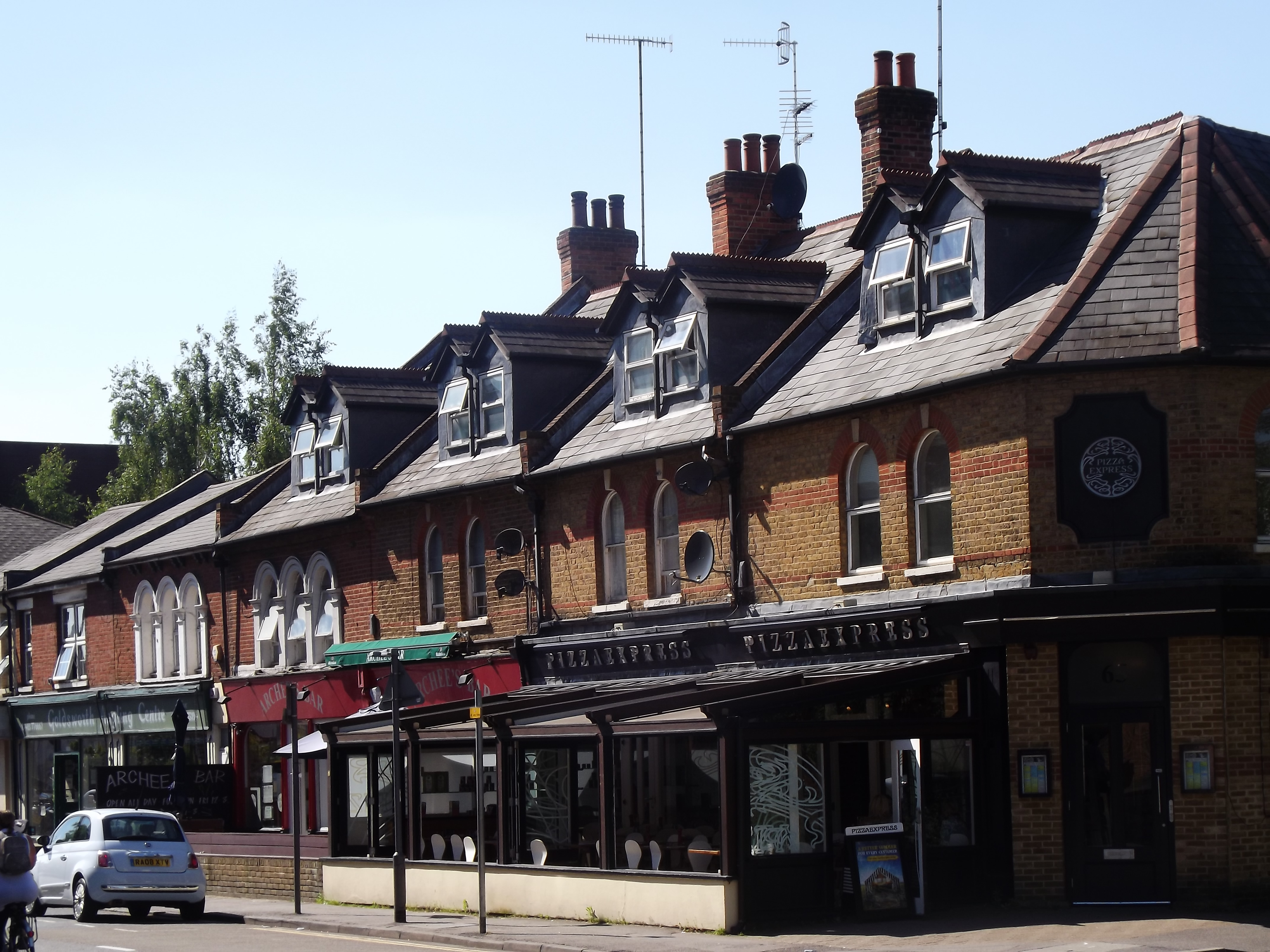
PizzaExpress, Goldsworth Road, Woking

To promote the song, Kunt hosted a flash mob on 29 May at the Woking PizzaExpress. The band also put out a video of the "Randy Andy's Memory Loss Remix" via the website Chortle, which uses footage from the Newsnight interview. In the mid-week Singles Chart update on 30 May, "Prince Andrew Is a Sweaty Nonce" reached No. 36.

The song's cover image shows Prince Andrew, holding a slice of pizza while smiling and sweating profusely. He stands underneath a string of bunting made from Union Jack pennants, with one section replaced with a slice of pizza.

== Reception ==
Before the song was released, Andy Malt at Complete Music Update compared the song to "God Save the Queen", saying that the Kunts make the Sex Pistols track "seem a bit twee".

On 31 May 2022, the Official Charts Twitter account announced it was one of the 'highest trending' songs in the UK. In June 2022, at the Glastonbury Festival, graffiti of the words 'Prince Andrew Is a Sweaty Nonce' appeared. Kunt responded to the news saying that it was: "Nice to see the good folk at Glastonbury are ready to welcome Prince Andrew back into public life."

On 6 April 2023, the Kunts announced they would be releasing a follow-up song under the new name the Krown Jewels. The song, "Scrap the Monarchy", was released on 5 May 2023, the day before the coronation of Charles III and Camilla.

== Personnel ==
The performers on the track are:

- Kunt – vocals
- Carsehole – lead guitar
- Rubber Johnny – bass guitar
- Fucksticks – drums

== Charts ==
Chart performance for "Prince Andrew Is a Sweaty Nonce"
Chart (2022)	Peak position
UK Singles (Official Charts)	20
UK Indie (Official Charts)	1
