= Cassetteboy =

English electronic music and comedy duo

Background information
- Origin: Brixton, London, England
- Genres: Electronic music, turntablism, plunderphonics
- Years active: 2000–present
- Labels: Barry's Bootlegs, Spymania, Antidote
- Members: Steve Warlin; Mark Bolton
- Website: YouTube channel

Cassetteboy are an English electronic music and comedy duo. The pair have achieved success with their cut-ups of celebrities such as Alan Sugar and David Cameron to make parodies of their subjects. Several of the duo's videos have gone viral, with 50 millions views on their own YouTube alone. Despite their success, Cassetteboy made no money from their videos due to their questionable legal status, until a revision of UK copyright law in 2014.

== Career ==
=== Members ===
Cassetteboy is a duo of Mark Bolton and Steve Warlin, though the pair prefer to remain anonymous. Bolton has worked writing audio descriptions for the blind, while Warlin has worked in various Irish pubs and in an art gallery.

The duo's name comes from the use of audio cassette in their early work. Their musical approach can be traced from the origins of sampling, musique concrète and plunderphonics. Most pieces are constructed from numerous audio and video snippets taken from TV, radio, film and popular music; The Parker Tapes was constructed using the laborious, primitive process of manually splicing segments of audio together via a two-deck tape system, or ghettoblaster; later albums are constructed digitally using sound editing software.

=== Early work ===
The duo formed in the mid-1990s as a hobby, making mixtapes for friends. They started adding humorous material between music, which ultimately took up so much time that they moved over to comedy full-time. Their initial appearance was on the Di and Dodi Do Die 7" Record released in 2000 on the Spymania offshoot Barry's Bootlegs, owned by a mysterious character known as Barry Evans, thought to be a pseudonym. As well as producing two albums of their own, they have recorded on an album with DJ Rubbish entitled Inside A Whale's Cock Vol 1, which includes humorous cover versions of songs by Alanis Morissette and Jennifer Lopez (a skiffle cover of "Jenny from the Block"), along with a parodical take on a song by The Streets.

In 2002 they released The Parker Tapes, which included the song "Fly Me To New York", a satirical political swipe at the 9/11 bombing, which includes Frank Sinatra's voice cut up to create the dialog. Joliver is a cut up of various Jamie Oliver samples, proclaiming himself to be a 'tosser', whilst 'Nogged Out with Sharon Davies' transforms David Bowie's 'Space Oddity' to hilarious effect. 'Pasta Rasta's Camo Visor Advisor (Revised)' is a cut up version of the song 'Camouflage' by Stan Ridgeway. 'Old Time Romantic Doves' chops up Lee Dorsey's 'Get Out My Life, Woman', whilst 'Dancing with Manatees' uses elements of Aphex Twin's 'Every Day'. Other sample sources include The Fall, Doctor Who, The Professionals, Madonna, many television advertisements, Coronation Street, The Smiths, BBC News, and St Winifred's School Choir, although cataloguing every sample used on the album is a near-impossible task. In addition to this, the album contains several longer, hip-hop inspired loops as interludes. The album received a favourable review in the New Musical Express upon release.

Their 2008 album, Carry On Breathing, was a concept album that "tells the story of human life through the medium of EastEnders samples". It contains the usual mix of samples from a variety of sources, including EastEnders, Doctor Who, American Dad!, The Simpsons, and many other samples taken from British Television and radio broadcasts. Cassetteboy disclosed the names of the band members shortly before the release of this album. Three of the track titles refer to the book Earth Inc., written by Michael Bollen.

In 2008, Bolton released Earth Inc., a satirical novel about consumerism. The book took six and a half years to write.

=== Viral videos ===
In 2008, the duo progressed to using videos and the internet, in order to teach themselves video editing. They initially struggled with new technology; the "Cassetteboy" page on Facebook and feed on Twitter were owned by other people. The first video uploaded to YouTube was a mashup of then Prime Minister Gordon Brown.

In 2009, they released Cassetteboy vs The Bloody Apprentice, a parody of the UK version of The Apprentice, primarily featuring the mashed-up dialogue of Alan Sugar. As of October 2014, the video has had over 5 million views on YouTube. Sugar says he has watched the video, while Apprentice judge Nick Hewer declared himself to be a fan of it. In 2010, a video clip by Cassetteboy appeared on "Friday Night With Jonathan Ross" using further clips of Sugar. In December 2014, the duo created a sequel to the video from later series of The Apprentice.

Cassetteboy contributed some of the video clips for spoof clip show 2009 Unwrapped with Miranda Hart, and is credited on at least one episode of BBC Radio 4's spoof clip show Listen Against. In 2010, the duo helped judge entries for London Recut, a project to encourage amateur filmmakers to produce their own work about the city.

In October 2014, Cassetteboy released "Cameron's Conference Rap", featuring cut-up clips of British Prime Minister David Cameron speaking at the annual Conservative Party Conference, set to Eminem's "Lose Yourself". During the following week, the video was viewed 3.5 million times, while Cameron's official speech video only had 44,000.

In September 2015, Cassetteboy responded to the "Piggate" scandal (the claim that Cameron had once inserted "a private part of his anatomy" into the mouth of a dead pig's head in an initiation ritual) with the viral hit Gettin' Piggy With It.

In April 2016, Cassetteboy released "Cassetteboy vs Jeremy Hunt", in response to strike action by NHS junior doctors over contract changes introduced by Jeremy Hunt, the current UK Health Secretary. The video contains mashups of Hunt's recent speeches over the tune of YMCA by the Village People.

=== Live performances ===
The duo have started to perform live concerts, which feature a variety of video mashups and other satirical material. They favour performing pop hits with additional voices for humorous effect, such as 50 Cent's "In Da Club" with Jeremy Paxman overdubbed. They have made several appearances at the Glastonbury Festival and appeared at the Edinburgh Fringe Festival with DJ Rubbish.

== Political campaigns ==
The context of their work is often political, but always maintains a humorous aspect. The duo describe themselves as left-leaning politically and think that "it’s good to have a point of view and too much comedy these days is bland and inoffensive". They are opposed to copyright law, saying that they could only have ever achieved popularity by creating works that violate copyright. The legal situation means that they have made no money from their videos despite millions of views. The duo have been approached by advertising agencies to make videos, but have been forced to refuse due to the resulting work being illegal.

In 2014, Cassetteboy welcomed a change in UK law that allows portions of works to be reused for satirical or parody purposes. In an interview for The Guardian, Cassetteboy said "There’s obviously public demand for our videos, but it was more or less impossible for people to pay us to actually make them". The duo compared their edited parody of Dragon's Den to the live-action sketch by Harry and Paul, noting that the content was similar but the legal status significantly different. They take an ambivalent attitude towards copyright infringement as it prevents them from being paid while also allowing them to create work for free, and believe it cannot be effectively controlled.

In December 2021, Cassetteboy remixed the satirical punk rock song "Boris Johnson is Still a Fucking Cunt", which was in the running to become the Christmas Number One slot alongside LadBaby's "Sausage Rolls for Everyone". After LadBaby's Mark Hoyle criticised the song in an interview, Cassetteboy joined the discussion stating that "Looks like 'Boris Johnson is Still a F***ing C***' getting to number one would annoy LadBaby too, who seems to be tough on food poverty, completely f***ing oblivious to the causes of food poverty."

== Selected discography ==
- The Parker Tapes 2002, Barry's Bootlegs/Spymania
- Festive Christmas 2002, Barry's Bootlegs
- Inside a Whale's Cock Vol 1 2003, Barry's Bootlegs
- Dead Horse 2005, Barry's Bootlegs
- Mick's Tape 2005, Antidote
- Carry On Breathing 2008, Barry's Bootlegs
