= Meat Beat Manifesto discography =

This is the discography for Meat Beat Manifesto.

== Albums ==
=== Studio albums ===
- 1989 Storm the Studio
- 1990 Armed Audio Warfare
- 1990 99%
- 1992 Satyricon
- 1996 Subliminal Sandwich
- 1998 Actual Sounds + Voices
- 2002 RUOK?
- 2005 At The Center
- 2008 Autoimmune
- 2010 Answers Come in Dreams
- 2018 Impossible Star
- 2019 Opaque Couché
- 2023 Man from Mantis
- 2024 Extinct (with Merzbow)

=== Remix albums ===
- 2003 Storm The Studio RMXS
- 2004 ...In Dub

=== Live albums ===
- 2006 Live '05

=== Compilation ===
- 1997 Original Fire
- 2007 Archive Things 1982-88

== EPs & singles ==
- 1987 Suck Hard (limited release of 1500 copies on vinyl)

A1 "I Got The Fear" (4:59)
B1 "Kick That Man" (5:26)
B2 "Kneel And Buzz" (4:33)
B3 Untitled (0:42)

- 1988 I Got The Fear
- 1988 Strap Down
- 1988 God O.D.
- 1990 Dog Star Man
- 1990 Helter Skelter/Radio Babylon
- 1990 Psyche Out
- 1991 Version Galore
- 1991 Now
- 1992 Edge of No Control
- 1993 Mindstream
- 1993 Peel Session
- 1993 Australian Tour EP
- 1996 Transmission
- 1996 Asbestos Lead Asbestos
- 1996 It's The Music
- 1997 Original Fire
- 1998 Acid Again
- 1998 Prime Audio Soup
- 2000 Eccentric Objects
- 2002 What Does It All Mean?
- 2004 Battersea Shield
- 2004 Echo In Space Dub / Retrograde Pt. 2 Dub We R 1
- 2005 Radio Free Republic/Lovefingers
- 2005 Off-Centre
- 2008 Guns N Lovers
- 2008 Lonely Soldier
- 2008 Tour 2008 EP
- 2010 Totally Together
- 2012 Test EP
- 2015 2.2 (Kasm02)
- 2016 2016 Tour EP
- 2019 Pin Drop / No Design

== Video releases ==
- 2004 ...In Dub
- 2006 Travelogue Live '05

== Compilation appearances ==
- 1991 Volume (magazine) - Volume One - "Love Mad"
- 1995 Survival 2000 - "Simulacra Part 2"
- 1995 Trance Atlantic - "Simulacra Part 1"
- 1995 EBN - telecommunication breakdown - production, manipulation by Jack dangers (TVT 4710 2) (enhanced w/ floppy disc)
- 1996 FMCD 44 - "Electric People (Jack Dangers Remix)"
- 1996 Volume (magazine) - Volume Sixteen - "Future Worlds (Alternative Version)"
- 1996 In Defense of Animals Volume 2 - "We Done It Again"
- 1996 Offbeat: A Red Hot Soundtrip - "I Control (Audio Collage #2)"
- 1997 Plastic Compilation Volume 1 - "She's Unreal (Alternate Mix 3)"
- 1998 For the Masses - "Everything Counts"
- 1999 Convergence (Where Live Meets Electronic) - "Source of Uncertainty: 1996"
- 1999 Hot Wheels Turbo Racing "Original Game Soundtrack" - "Eclectic People"
- 1999 Earth Dance - "Anon"
- 2000 Better Living Through Circuitry - "Parts 1-4"
- 2003 The Animatrix: The Album - "Martenot Waves"
- 2004 Moog Original Film Soundtrack - "Unavailable Memory"
- 2005 Destroy All Humans! Soundtrack - "Mind Over Matter" and "We Shall Destroy You"
- 2006 Underworld: Evolution Soundtrack - "Suicide"
- 2008 Rebirth 1.0 - "The Unprintable Word"
- 2008 Brainwaves 2008 - "Reanimator pts. 5-8", "Apathetic Sympathetic"
- 2016 Cold Waves V - "Falling Upright (Acucrack Tough N Ruthless Remix)"
- 2018 Cold Waves VII - "Brain Wrong"
- 2020 Cold Waves 2020 - "Distorted Information"

== Music videos ==
- 1989 I Got The Fear
- 1989 Strap Down
- 1990 99%
- 1990 Psyche Out
- 1992 Edge of No Control
- 1992 Mindstream
- 1996 Asbestos Lead Asbestos
- 1997 Helter Skelter '97
- 1998 Prime Audio Soup
- 2004 Fromage

== Selected remixes ==
- Atomic Babies "Cetch Da' Monkey"
- Boom Boom Satellites "4 a Moment of Silence"
- Banco de Gaia "How Much Reality Can You Take"
- Bush "Insect Kin"
- Consolidated "Butyric Acid"
- David Bowie "Pallas Athena"
- Deepsky "Stargazer"
- Depeche Mode "Rush"
- Excepter "Kill People"
- D.H.S. "House of God"
- Empirion "Narcotic Influence"
- God Lives Underwater "Rearrange" (Example 1 + 2)
- MC 900 Ft. Jesus "Killer Inside Me"
- Nine Inch Nails "Closer (Deviation)"
- Nine Inch Nails "The Perfect Drug"
- Orbital "Oolaa"
- Scorn "Silver Rain Fell"
- The Shamen "Ebeneezer Goode", "Hyperreal"
- The Young Gods "Kissing the Sun"
- Tower of Power "What Is Hip"
- Twilight Circus Dub Sound System "Highway"
