= Autoimmune (album) =

Studio album by Meat Beat Manifesto
- Released: 8 April 2008
- Recorded: Room 5
- Genres: Electronica, trip hop, dubstep, hip hop, breakbeat, IDM
- Length: US version 65:45; UK version 50:27
- Labels: Metropolis Records MET531; Planet Mu ZIQ202
- Producer: Jack Dangers

Meat Beat Manifesto chronology
At the Center (2005)	Autoimmune (2008)	Answers Come in Dreams (2010)

Professional ratings
Review scores
Source	Rating
AllMusic	4.5/5 stars
PopMatters	6/10

Autoimmune is an album by Meat Beat Manifesto. Though the album was originally announced as a 20-track double-CD release, frontman Jack Dangers decided to shorten the album to a single disc with different track listings between the US and European releases. Stylistically, it steps up the pace from other recent Meat Beat Manifesto albums, using elements of dub, hip-hop, industrial, breakbeat and more, and it is regarded as a partial return to the early industrial sound of the band in the late 1980s. The album has also been described as Dangers' take on dubstep, though he has stated that Meat Beat Manifesto has always utilized the underlying concepts of that particular genre. Autoimmune is the first Meat Beat Manifesto album with Danger's vocals since Actual Sounds + Voices in 1998; he appears on the track "Solid Waste". The album cover continues the checkerboard/grid theme also seen on earlier Meat Beat Manifesto albums Actual Sounds + Voices, RUOK? and the Off-Centre EP. Most of the remaining songs that were excised from the original double-disc concept were later released on an EP available only on the Autoimmune tour.

== Track listing ==
All tracks by Jack Dangers

The UK track listing is shorter and in a different order, and includes two songs not on the US release: "House of Unique Stink" and "(Live) And Direct (Live)". Several songs are also altered in their mix. For example, "Less" includes an extra two minutes of ambient sound on the UK release, whereas "Spanish Vocoder" is missing a minute and a half of ambient sound at the end.

=== US CD Metropolis ===
1. "International" - 1:39
2. "I Hold the Mic!" (Featuring: Daddy Sandy) - 4:52
3. "Hellfire" - 5:23
4. "Less" - 5:16
5. "Solid Waste" - 3:50
6. "Lonely Soldier" - 5:28
7. "Children of Planet Earth" - 5:00
8. "Young Cassius" (Featuring: MC Azeem) - 5:37
9. "Guns N Lovers" - 5:54
10. "Return to Bass" - 3:55
11. "62 Dub" - 5:49
12. "Colors of Sound" - 5:05
13. "Spanish Vocoder" - 6:11
14. "International Reprise" - 1:46

=== UK CD Planet Mu ===
1. "I Hold The Mic!" (Featuring: Daddy Sandy) - 4:53
2. "Children Of Planet Earth" - 4:06
3. "House of Unique Stink" - 5:00
4. "(Live) And Direct (Live)" - 4:00
5. "Less" - 7:11
6. "Lonely Soldier" - 5:27
7. "Spanish Vocoder" - 4:40
8. "Return To Bass" - 3:58
9. "Guns N Lovers" - 5:52
10. "Hellfire (Remix)" - 5:20

== Outtakes and B-sides ==
These tracks appeared on an exclusive tour EP after the release of Autoimmune and were originally intended to appear on the planned double-disc release of the album. "Bush of Lies" was first released as a free download on the band's official website.

1. "Fuck People Abstract" - 1:47
2. "Bush Of Lies" - 4:48
3. "Born To Trouble" - 2:37
4. "Hardware Performance" - 6:00
5. "Apathetic - Sympathetic" - 3:49

== Personnel ==
- Jack Dangers – performer, producer, mixing, programming
- Lynn Farmer – drums
- Ben Stokes – video
- Kenneth James Gibson – bass and percussion on "House Of Unique Stink"
- Mark Pistel – wires
- Daddy Sandy – vocals on "I Hold the Mic!"
- MC Azeem – vocals on "Young Cassius"
- DJ Z-Trip – turntables
- Rich Borge – album art
