= ...In Dub =

Remix album by Meat Beat Manifesto
- Released: 2004
- Genres: Dub, drum and bass

Meat Beat Manifesto chronology
Storm the Studio RMXS (2003)	...In Dub (2004)	At the Center (2005)

Professional ratings
Review scores
Source	Rating
AllMusic	4/5 stars

...In Dub is a dub remix album by Meat Beat Manifesto. ...In Dub is mostly remixes of RUOK? material with select songs featuring vocals by DJ Collage; however, there are some original tracks. The album was issued as both a CD and a DVD which contains minimalistic music videos. Both versions also have separate track listings.

== Track listing ==
=== CD version ===
1. "Introduction Dub" – 1:30
2. "Echo in Space Dub" – 4:26
3. "Spinning Round Dub" – 5:32
4. "Fromage Dub" – 5:50
5. "Intermission Dub" – 4:07
6. "Super Soul Dub" – 5:26
  - Drums, Percussion, Songwriter: Lynn Farmer
7. "Caramel Dub" – 4:26
8. "Happiness Supreme Dub" – 4:44
9. "Retrograde Dub" – 5:22
10. "Timebomb Dub" – 3:24
11. "Radiation Dub" – 7:28
12. "Retrograde Pt. 2 Dub We R 1" – 4:59

=== DVD version ===
1. "Introduction Dub"
2. "Echo In Space Dub"
  - Vocals: DJ Collage
3. "Spinning Round Dub"
4. "Fromage Dub"
  - Vocals: DJ Collage
5. "Intermission Dub"
6. "Super Soul Dub"
  - Featuring: Lynn Farmer
  - Vocals: DJ Collage
7. "Caramel Dub"
8. "Happiness Supreme Dub"
9. "Retrograde Dub"
  - Vocals: DJ Collage
10. "Radiation Dub"
11. "This Is A Test"
12. "Deep Field Recording #3"
