= Pro.File 1 Meat Beat Manifesto/Jack Dangers Remix Collection =

Compilation album by Jack Dangers
- Released: 2002
- Label: Brooklyn Music Limited BML5007

Pro.File 1 Meat Beat Manifesto/Jack Dangers Remix Collection is a collection of remixes by Jack Dangers and his collaborative Meat Beat Manifesto.

== Track listing ==
1. DHS: "House Of God (Jack Dangers Mix)" - 7:15
  - Remix by: Jack Dangers
2. Nine Inch Nails: "Closer (Deviation)" - 6:16
  - Remix by: Jack Dangers
3. David Bowie: "You've Been Around (Dangers Mix)" - 6:57
  - Remix by: Jack Dangers
4. Deepsky: "Stargazer (Tuff Mix)" - 6:24
  - Remix by: Meat Beat Manifesto
5. Atomic Babies: "Cetcha Da' Monkey (Sonolgy Instrumental Mix)" - 6:10
  - Remix by: Meat Beat Manifesto
6. The Shamen: "Hyperreal (Selector Mix)" - 3:48
  - Remix by: Meat Beat Manifesto
7. David Byrne: "Ava (Nu Wage Mix)" - 3:57
  - Remix by: Meat Beat Manifesto
8. Freddy Fresh: "Party Right (All Terrain Mountain Mix)" - 9:04
  - Remix by: Jack Dangers
9. Banco de Gaia: "How Much Reality Can You Take? (Mysterious Drum Mix)" - 6:52
  - Remix by: Jack Dangers
10. Papa Brittle: "Status Quo (Westminster Dub)" - 8:24
  - Remix by: Jack Dangers
11. Tino: "Liquid Dub (Jack Dangers Mix)" - 5:15
  - Remix by: Jack Dangers
