= Battersea Shield (EP) =

EP by The Orb V Meat Beat Manifesto
- Released: November 2004
- Label: Malicious Damage
- Producer: Alex Paterson, Jack Dangers, Lynn Farmer

Battersea Shield is a 2004 EP by The Orb and Meat Beat Manifesto. It was sold in an embossed tin based on the design of the Battersea Shield, instead of a standard jewel case.

A different version of "Matron" was previously released as "Horn of Jericho" on the Meat Beat Manifesto album RUOK?. "Insane" was recorded and mixed at Concrete Hull in 2004. "1855 BC" reuses samples which were used in previous Meat Beat Manifesto tracks.

== Track listing ==
1. "Matron" - 7:12
2. "1855 BC" - 18:55
3. The Orb: "Insane" - 6:14
