= Variaciones Espectrales =

Studio album by Jack Dangers
- Released: 2002
- Recorded: Tape Lab, California sometime in October 2001

Jack Dangers chronology
Tape Music (2001)	Variaciones Espectrales (2002)	Forbidden Planet Explored (2004)

Professional ratings
Aggregate scores
Source	Rating
Metacritic	75/100
Review scores
Source	Rating
AllMusic	4/5 stars
Q	3/5 stars
Alternative Press	8/10

Variaciones Espectrales is the first proper album credited to Jack Dangers. It was recorded as part of the Series 7 collection for Bella Union, an independent record label, the directive being that Dangers had to record one song a day for seven days. Lynn Farmer is credited to playing drums on tracks 2, 3 and 4. The material present often sounds very reminiscent of the Meat Beat Manifesto album RUOK? which appeared later in the same year, and it is likely that some of these tracks represented early sketches of RUOK? material; the last track "Echo In Space", in particular, is nearly identical to "No Echo In Space" from RUOK?

== Track listing ==
1. "Nano" - 5:38
2. "Every Technique" - 1:13
3. "No Secrets No Surprises" - 4:58
4. "Zxero" - 3:57
5. "Short Heavies" - 3:14
6. "3:00 Min" - 3:04
7. "Echo In Space" - 7:36
