= Archive Things 1982–88 =

Compilation album by Meat Beat Manifesto / Perennial Divide
- Released: 2007 April
- Recorded: 1982–1988
- Genre: Industrial

Archive Things 1982–88 is a compilation of Jack Dangers early work, much of which was issued in very limited editions.

== Track listing ==
CD 1

1. Meat Beat Manifesto: "Guitarworks" - 4:43
2. Meat Beat Manifesto: "1234" - 2:02
3. Meat Beat Manifesto: "West Window" - 1:13
4. Meat Beat Manifesto: "Falling" - 1:56
5. Meat Beat Manifesto: "B.R.E.L." - 7:12
6. Meat Beat Manifesto: "International Disease" - 5:28
7. Meat Beat Manifesto: "Dirty Ray" - 4:21
8. Meat Beat Manifesto: "I Got The Fear" - 5:03
9. Meat Beat Manifesto: "Design For Living" - 6:10
10. Meat Beat Manifesto: "Kneel And Buzz" - 4:18
11. Meat Beat Manifesto: "Untitled 5" - 4:58
12. Meat Beat Manifesto: "Snareworks" - 1:40
13. Meat Beat Manifesto: "Synthesizer Test" - 4:30
  - Producer - Andy Partridge
14. Meat Beat Manifesto: "Lid Locks" - 6:13
15. Space Children: "Let's Go Disco 7"" - 3:58

CD 2 All songs by Perennial Divide

1. "Blow" - 4:33
2. "Parricide" - 2:21
3. "Word Of The Lord" - 4:19
4. "Captain Swing" - 4:33
5. "Rescue" - 5:00
6. "The Fall" - 5:32
7. "Trip" - 4:56
8. "Tuna Hell" - 1:13
9. "Burning Dogs" - 5:49
10. "End Of The Line" - 5:20
11. "Burn Down 7"" - 4:23
12. "Permanent Way 7" (4:04
13. "Beehead 7"" - 4:11
14. "Leathernecks 7"" - 4:22
  - Engineer - Colin James, Jack Dangers
  - Remix - MBM
15. "E.C.T. 7"" - 4:32
  - Engineer - Colin James, Jack Dangers
  - MBM
