= ¡Hello Friends! =

Compilation album by Jack Dangers
- Released: 2001 February 13
- Label: Shadow Records SDW097-2

¡Hello Friends! (subtitled Jack Dangers plays with the records of Tino Corp.) is a compilation album DJ'ed by Jack Dangers including music produced by himself and Ben Stokes.

== Track listing ==
1. Loop Finder General: "Shave My Head" – 4:00
2. Tino: "Tropical Soul/Tino's Beat" – 3:38
3. Tino: "Christmas In Hawaii" – 2:48
4. Tino: "Exercise For The Left Hand" – 2:43
5. Tino: "Mambothon" – 7:02
6. Tino: "Kick It Dub" – 4:09
7. Bo Square: "Numbers" – 5:45
  - Produced by: Mike Powell
8. Tino: "D.U.B. Dub" – 3:05
9. Tino: "Toasted Dub" – 4:15
10. Tino: "Elegant Dub" – 3:40
  - Produced by: Mike Powell
11. Tino: "Ritmos Latinos" – 3:48
12. Meat Beat Manifesto: "Structures" – 4:17
13. Tino: "La Tino Beat" – 2:56
14. DHS: "House Of God (Jack Dangers Mix)" – 2:42
  - Remix by: Jack Dangers
15. DHS: House Of God (DHS Mix)" – 6:57
- A music video is also included on the CD in .mov format:
  - Ben Stokes: "Tino's Factory Video" – 3:34
