= World Domination Enterprises =

English post-punk band (1984–89)

- Origin: London, England
- Genres: Noise rock Post-punk; Experimental
- Years active: 1984–1989
- Labels: Karbon; Product Inc (Mute Records); Immaculate Records
- Past members: Keith Dobson; Steve Jameson; Digger Metters; Simon Doling

World Domination Enterprises was an English post-punk band active in the mid/late 1980s. Fronted by former Here & Now drummer Keith Dobson, the band's dissonant sound mixed elements of punk, noise, dub, hip hop, and rockabilly. They were best known for their cover version of LL Cool Js "I Can't Live Without My Radio", and first single "Asbestos Lead Asbestos". The latter song was later referenced in the 1990 Carter USM single "Rubbish", and covered by Meat Beat Manifesto on their 1996 album Subliminal Sandwich.

Their debut album Let's Play Domination was released in 1988. The band was linked with the Mutoid Waste Company, and played at many of their events, as well as CND benefits. Much of their back catalogue was compiled on the 2009 reissue of Let's Play Domination.

== Selected discography ==
Chart placings shown are from the UK Indie Chart.

=== Albums ===
- Let's Play Domination (1988)
- Love From Lead City (1988)

=== Singles ===
- "Asbestos Lead Asbestos" (1985)
- "Catalogue Clothes" (1986) (#24)
- "Hotsy Girl" (1987) (#15)
- "I Can't Live Without My Radio" (1988) (#8)
- "The Company News" (1989)
- "Go Dominator/Woke Up Just In Time (2020)"
