= Off Centre (disambiguation) =

Off Centre is an American TV show.

Off Centre or Off Center may also refer to:

- Off Centre (album), by Gilbert O'Sullivan, 1980
- Off-Centre (EP), by Meat Beat Manifesto, 2005
- Off Center (short story collection), by Damon Knight, 1965
- Off Centre, Indian television news show broadcast by CNN-News18
