= Live '05 =

Live album by Meat Beat Manifesto
- Released: February 09 2006
- Recorded: 2005
- Genre: Electronica, trip hop, big beat
- Label: Tino Corp.

Live '05 is a live album by Meat Beat Manifesto initially sold during their live tour in 2006. Left over copies were sold online via the band's official website. The concert recorded took place at Cabaret Metro in Chicago on June 22, 2005. This is a limited edition of 1,000 and each disc is packaged in a digipak signed and customized by Jack Dangers. On the reverse side, near the center of the disc, the text "NEAT BEAT MANIFESTO-LIVE '05" is printed.

== Credits ==
- Video Sampler, Vocals, Synthi Aks, Bass Flute: Jack Dangers
- Video Sampler, DVJ: Ben Stokes
- Sampler, Serge Modular: Mark Pistel
- Drums: Lynn Farmer

== Track listing ==
1. "I Am Electro" - 6:25
2. "Spinning Round" - 5:31
3. "Hello Teenage Amerika" - 5:52
4. "Radio Babylon" - 8:20
5. "God O.D." - 5:45
6. "No Purpose No Design" - 5:27
7. "It's The Music" - 5:57
8. "Nuclear Bomb" - 6:12
9. "Helter Skelter" - 8:18
10. "Edge Of No Control" - 5:18
11. "Prime Audio Soup" - 7:02
12. "Do It With Soul" - 4:46
