= Subliminal Sandwich =

Studio album by Meat Beat Manifesto
- Released: 4 June 1996
- Recorded: 1993–1996 in San Francisco, London and Chicago
- Genre: Electronica; trip hop; big beat; ambient; electro-industrial; experimental
- Length: 68:50 (disc 1); 69:03 (disc 2)
- Label: Nothing/Interscope
- Producer: Jack Dangers

Meat Beat Manifesto chronology
Satyricon (1992)	Subliminal Sandwich (1996)	Actual Sounds + Voices (1998)

Professional ratings
Review scores
Source	Rating
AllMusic	4/5 stars
Alternative Press	4/5 stars
Muzik	4/5 stars
NME	8/10
Rolling Stone	3.5/5 stars
Sputnikmusic	4/5 stars

Subliminal Sandwich is a 1996 double album released by Meat Beat Manifesto on Interscope Records. The album is often more experimental than the group's prior material, composed of lengthier pieces that incorporate more ambient textures and drones with and fewer samples or defined song structures.

Subliminal Sandwich was composed during Meat Beat Manifesto's 1993 tour supporting their 1992 album Satyricon and would have been released in 1994 or 1995 if not for legal tangles with the band's Belgian label Play It Again Sam. Two singles were released from the album, the original song "Transmission" and a version of "Asbestos Lead Asbestos" from the 1988 album Let's Play Domination by World Domination Enterprises.

== Reception ==
In 2015, Fact Magazine ranked the album at number 47 in its list of "The 50 Best Trip-Hop Albums of All Time," saying "it remains an interesting offering, drawing links between trip-hop, dub, industrial and ambient with a touch of psychedelia."

== In other media ==
The song "She's Unreal" was featured on the soundtrack of the 1999 film The Blair Witch Project, on a "mix tape" entitled Josh's Blair Witch Mix.

== Track listing ==
All songs written by Jack Dangers (unless otherwise noted).

=== Disc one ===
1. "Sound Innovation" – 2:18
2. "Nuclear Bomb" – 6:12
3. "Long Periods of Time" – 4:33
4. "1979" – 5:25
5. "Future Worlds" – 4:56
6. "What's Your Name?" – 2:47
7. "She's Unreal" – 4:10
8. "Asbestos Lead Asbestos" (Keith Dobson) – 6:22
9. "Mass Producing Hate" – 3:01
10. "Radio Mellotron" – 1:07
11. "Assassinator" – 5:22
12. "Phone Calls from the Dead" – 3:13
13. "Lucid Dream" – 2:09
14. "Addiction" – 4:07
15. "No Purpose No Design" – 2:18
16. "Cancer" – 4:34
17. "Transmission" – 4:09
18. "We Done" – 2:07

=== Disc two ===
1. "Set Your Receivers" – 0:23
2. "Mad Bomber/The Woods" – 10:16
3. "The Utterer" – 6:51
4. "United Nations (E.T.C.)" – 4:05
5. "Stereophrenic" – 13:03
6. "Teargas" – 0:38
7. "Plexus" – 3:29
8. "Electric People" – 14:03
9. "Tweekland" – 7:55
10. "Simulacra" – 8:20

== Personnel ==
- Jack Dangers – voice, bass, waterphone, bass clarinet, mellotron, theremin, synthesizers, samples, turntables and dishes

=== Disc 1 collaborators ===
- Joe Gore – guitar (tracks 5, 6, 7, 14)
- Hell Louise – voice (tracks 6, 17)
- Mike Powell – theremin, b. voice (tracks 3, 9)
- Jonny Stevens – guitar (track 8)

=== Disc 2 collaborators ===
- Arjan Macnamara – Jupiter 8 (track 10)
- Mark Pistel – Moog, OB 8, e. bow, theremin (tracks 3, 8, 9)
- Mike Powell – theremin (track 5, 8)
- Philip Steir – Octapad (track 2)
- Jonny Stevens – 100 M system, Oberheim OBM-X (tracks 3, 5)
- Ben Stokes – percussion (track 3)
- Lee Walker – Jupiter 8, Jupiter 4 (tracks 4, 7)
- John Wilson – feedback generator (track 3)

== Art+Graphics ==
- Richard Borge - model making / graphic design
