= Hello Friends =

Hello Friends may refer to:

- ¡Hello Friends!, a compilation album DJ'ed by Jack Dangers
- Hello Friends (TV series), a Hindi language sitcom
- The signature catchphrase of American sportscaster Jim Nantz

== See also ==
- Hello Friend, a 2003 British film
- "Hello Friend" (song), a 1986 single by Chris Rea
