= Loudness Clarifies / Electronic Music from Tapelab =

Loudness Clarifies/Electronic Music From Tapelab

Studio album by Jack Dangers
- Released: 2 November 2004
- Recorded: 1993–2004
- Label: Important Records imprec042

Jack Dangers chronology
Forbidden Planet Explored (2004)	Loudness Clarifies/Electronic Music From Tapelab (2004)

Loudness Clarifies/Electronic Music From Tapelab is a double album by Jack Dangers. Disc two compiles ten years worth of Jack's experimental musique concrète tape work and is a selection of electro-acoustic works recorded between 1993 and 2003 for film, radio and television. Disc one is similar to Dangers' work with Meat Beat Manifesto.
