= DHS (disambiguation) =

DHS is the Department of Homeland Security, a U.S. federal executive department.

DHS, dhs, or DHs may also refer to:

== Currencies ==
- Dirham
  - Moroccan dirham
  - Emirati dirham

== Government agencies and programs ==
- Demographic and Health Surveys, an international USAID program
- Department of Human Services, government departments at national and subnational levels
- Los Angeles County Department of Health Services
- New York City Department of Homeless Services

== Science and technology ==
- 3-Dehydroshikimic acid (3-DHS), a chemical compound
- DNase I hypersensitive site, in genetics
- Dynamic hip screw, a surgical implant
- Docking Hub System, a former proposed International Space Station module

== Schools ==
- Dunman High School, a secondary school in Kallang, Singapore
- Dundonald High School, a public high school in Belfast, Northern Ireland
- Delmar High School, a public high school in Delmar, Delaware, United States
- Deerfield High School (Illinois), a public high school in Deerfield, Illinois, United States (Chicago metropolitan area)
- Dollarway High School, a public high school in Pine Bluff, Arkansas, United States
- Dulles High School (Sugar Land, Texas), a public high school in Sugar Land, Texas, United States (Houston metropolitan area)
- Davis High School (disambiguation)
- Dartmouth High School (disambiguation)

== Other uses ==
- Dame of the Order of the Holy Sepulchre, a Catholic order of knighthood
- Decent Homes Standard, a technical standard in the United Kingdom
- Desert Hot Springs, California, a city in the United States
- Digital Homicide Studios, a defunct video game developer
- Historical Dictionary of Switzerland (French: Dictionnaire historique de la Suisse)
- Dhaiso language (ISO 639-3 code: dhs)

== See also ==
- Discount Home Shoppers' Club (DHS Club), an American company
