= Travelogue Live '05 =

Video by Meat Beat Manifesto
- Released: 2006 November 21
- Recorded: 2005 June 22
- Length: mm:ss
- Label: Music Video Dist. MVD4542DVD

Travelogue Live '05 is a live DVD of a Meat Beat Manifesto performance at Cabaret Metro in Chicago, Illinois, on June 22, 2005. AllMusic called the video "a visually intriguing package" and "a fun jaunt and might spice up a party."

== Credits ==
- Drums - Lynn Farmer
- Sampler, Serge Modular - Mark Pistel
- Video Sampler, Dvj - Ben Stokes
- Video Sampler, Vocals, Synthi Aks, Bass Flute - Jack Dangers

== Track listing ==
1. "Hello Cleveland"
2. "I Am Electro"
3. "Spinning Round"
4. "Radio Babylon"
5. "Japan"
6. "God O.D."
7. "Europe"
8. "No Purpose No Design"
9. "Southern States"
10. "She's Unreal/Helter Skelter"
11. "The Light Incident"
12. "Edge Of No Control"
13. "Prime Audio Soup"
