= Forbidden Planet Explored =

Live album by Jack Dangers
- Released: July 20, 2004
- Recorded: March 6, 2004
- Label: Important Records imprec038

Jack Dangers chronology
Variaciones Espectrales (2002)	Forbidden Planet Explored (2004)	Loudness Clarifies / Electronic Music from Tapelab (2004)

Professional ratings
Review scores
Source	Rating
AllMusic	4/5 stars

Forbidden Planet Explored is a double album by Jack Dangers. The first CD is a live performance of the soundtrack to Forbidden Planet while the second CD is sci-fi sound effects.

== Liner notes ==
"Music feed recorded live at the I.D.E.A.L Festival, Le Lieu Unique in Nantes, France on March 6, 2004 during the screening of the film Forbidden Planet. Forbidden Planet Explored contains a second CD full of sci-fi sound effects inspired by the BBC Radiophonic Workshop (a highly innovative collaborative workshop responsible for early groundbreaking electronic music which were used as the soundtrack for numerous BBC programs starting in the sixties) and vintage sci-fi films such as Forbidden Planet. Sci Fi Sound Effects was created on his room-sized EMS Synthi 100. Jack's Synthi 100 is one of only 29 ever built and one of the few Synthi's known to be operational. From the Synthi 100 this maestro of sound is able to produce elaborate unheard tones, drones, bleeps and blobs. This CD is only available as an accompaniment to Forbidden Planet Explored."
