= 99% (Meat Beat Manifesto album) =

Studio album by Meat Beat Manifesto
- Released: December 1990
- Recorded: 1990
- Genre: Electro-industrial
- Length: 44:42
- Label: Mute
- Producer: Marc Adams, Jack Dangers, Craig Morrison, Jonny Stephens

Meat Beat Manifesto chronology
Armed Audio Warfare (1990)	99% (1990)	Satyricon (1992)

99% is the third studio album by British electronic music group Meat Beat Manifesto. The album peaked at No. 6 on the CMJ Radio Top 150.

== Critical reception ==
Professional ratings
Review scores
Source	Rating
AllMusic	3/5 stars
Entertainment Weekly	B+
NME	8/10
Q	3/5 stars
Select	3/5
Spin Alternative Record Guide	7/10
Tom Hull – on the Web	B+
The Village Voice	A−

The Washington Post wrote that "these 10 tracks employ some obnoxious samples and plenty of metallic wallop, but the ultimate effect is almost seamless."

== Track listing ==
No.	Title	Length
1.	"Now"	5:19
2.	"Psyche Out"	4:44
3.	"All the Things You Are"	4:40
4.	"Hello Teenage America"	2:05
5.	"10X Faster Than the Speed of Love"	5:56
6.	"99%"	0:19
7.	"Dogstar Man/Helter Skelter"	8:34
8.	"Think Fast"	5:01
9.	"Hallucination Generation"	2:40
10.	"Deviate"	5:24

== Personnel ==
- Jack Dangers
- Jonny Stephens
- Greg Retch
- Craig Morrison - cover art
