= Answers Come in Dreams =

Studio album by Meat Beat Manifesto
- Released: 12 October 2010
- Genre: Electronic, dubstep, ambient, glitch
- Length: US version 73:00; UK version 52:59
- Label: Metropolis Records; Hydrogen Dukebox
- Producer: Jack Dangers

Meat Beat Manifesto chronology
Autoimmune (2008)	Answers Come in Dreams (2010)	Impossible Star (2018)

Professional ratings
Review scores
Source	Rating
AllMusic	4/5 stars
PopMatters	7/10
Mojo	3/5 stars
Record Collector	4/5 stars
Tom Hull – on the Web	B+

Answers Come in Dreams is an album by Meat Beat Manifesto. It consists of lengthy ambient, glitch, and dubstep-focused pieces, with an attention to texture rather than the raw sampling and breakbeat rhythms seen on many of the group's previous releases.

== Track listing ==
=== US CD Metropolis ===
1. "Luminol" - 6:05
2. "Mnemonic" - 5:58
3. "MYC" - 7:09
4. "Let Me Set" - 5:40
5. "# Zero" - 4:37
6. "Quietus" - 6:33
7. "Token Words" - 6:48
8. "Waterphone" - 9:23
9. "010130" - 1:02
10. "Zenta!" - 5:09
11. "Please" - 5:23
12. "Chimie Du Son" - 9:18

=== UK CD Hydrogen Dukebox ===
1. "010130" - 1:04
2. "Quietus" - 4:30
3. "Mnemonic" - 4:20
4. "Luminol" - 6:04
5. "Please" - 5:24
6. "# Zero" - 4:36
7. "Token Words" - 6:50
8. "Waterphone" - 8:05
9. "Let Me Set" - 5:39
10. "Chimie Du Son" - 6:27

== Personnel ==
- Jack Dangers - performer, producer
- Dave Dasher - programming, sounds (on "MYC")
