= Dartmouth High School =

Dartmouth High School may refer to:

- Dartmouth High School (Nova Scotia), in Dartmouth, Nova Scotia, Canada
- Dartmouth High School (Sandwell), in England
- Dartmouth High School (Massachusetts), in Dartmouth, Massachusetts, United States
