= Off-Centre (EP) =

EP by Meat Beat Manifesto
- Released: 2005 October 25
- Length: Thirsty Ear THI57164.2

Off-Centre is a release by Meat Beat Manifesto which follows the album At The Center. Drums and percussion from tracks 1–4 are credited to David King. Steinway Grand Piano, Fender Rhodes and Hammond B3 instrumentation from tracks 1–4 are credited to Craig Taborn. Jack Dangers is crediting for writing, producing and engineering the album in addition to playing bass, bass flute, bass clarinet and everything else on tracks 1–4. Tracks 5 and 6 were recorded at Metro, Chicago, June 22, 2005. The live line up was Lynn Farmer on drums, Mark Pistel on sampler, and Ben Stokes and Jack Dangers on video sampler. One month before release Postcards and Maintain Discipline where available as free MP3s for download from Amazon.com. The album was released in CD format and 12" vinyl.

== Track listing ==
=== CD ===
1. "Wild (Rmx)" - 6:14
  - Flute: Peter Gordon
2. "Postcards" - 5:35
3. "Maintain Discipline" - 4:50
4. "Dummyhead Stereo" - 5:28
5. "Shotgun! (Blast To The Brain) (Live)" - 5:15
  - Drums: Lynn Farmer
  - Featuring: Ben Stokes, Mark Pistel
6. "Prime Audio Soup (Live)" - 7:06
  - Drums: Lynn Farmer
  - Featuring: Ben Stokes, Mark Pistel

=== 12" vinyl ===
Side A

1. "Wild (Remix)" - 6:14
2. "Dummyhead Stereo" - 5:28

Side B

1. "Postcards" - 5:35
2. "Maintain Discipline" - 4:50
