= Satyricon (Meat Beat Manifesto album) =

Studio album by Meat Beat Manifesto
- Released: September 29, 1992
- Recorded: 1992
- Genres: Electro-industrial, trip hop, breakbeat, IDM, techno, electronica
- Length: 64:23
- Label: Elektra
- Producer: Meat Beat Manifesto

Meat Beat Manifesto chronology
99% (1990)	Satyricon (1992)	Subliminal Sandwich (1996)

Professional ratings
Review scores
Source	Rating
AllMusic	4.5/5 stars
Q	3/5 stars
Select	5/5
Spin Alternative Record Guide	8/10

Satyricon is the fourth studio album by British electronic music group Meat Beat Manifesto.

== Track listing ==
1. "Pot Sounds" – 2:06
2. "Mindstream" – 4:52
3. "Drop" – 4:07
4. "Original Control (Version 1)" – 5:02
5. "Your Mind Belongs to the State" – 5:02
6. "Circles" – 4:15
7. "The Sphere" – 0:39
8. "Brainwashed This Way/Zombie/That Shirt" – 5:31
9. "Original Control (Version 2)" – 5:22
10. "Euthanasia" – 4:33
11. "Edge of No Control, Pt. 1" – 5:59
12. "Edge of No Control, Pt. 2" – 3:15
13. "Untold Stories" – 1:52
14. "Son of Sam" – 4:49
15. "Track 15" – 1:27
16. "Placebo" – 5:04

== Samples ==
Several of the dialogue samples used on Satyricon come from the 1974 John Carpenter film Dark Star, specifically:

- "Drop" samples the scene in which Bomb #20 refuses to detach from the bomb bay doors.
- "Track 15" includes a clip from the end of the film when Talby enters the Phoenix asteroid cluster, saying, "I'm beginning to glow."
- "Original Control (Version 2)" has a sample from the dinner discussion between Pinback and Doolittle: "Do you think we'll ever find any intelligent life out there?" ... "Who cares?"

Other samples found on the album include:

- "We have come to visit you in peace and with goodwill", from the film The Day the Earth Stood Still, in "Pot Sounds" and "Mindstream".
- "He must answers questions that cannot yet be...", from the film The Illustrated Man, in "Placebo".
- Interview samples from the Monkees' film Head and the James Toback documentary The Big Bang, in "Your Mind Belongs to the State".
- "I am Elektro", a sample from Elektro the robot, first seen at the 1939 New York World's Fair, in "Original Control (Version 2)".
- "Brainwashed This Way/Zombie/That Shirt" contains dialog from David Cronenberg's 1983 movie Videodrome.
