= Let's Play Domination =

Studio album by World Domination Enterprises
- Released: 1988
- Genre: Post-punk, noise rock
- Label: Product Inc.

World Domination Enterprises chronology
Let's Play Domination (1988)	Dub Domination (1988)

Let's Play Domination is the debut studio album by English rock band World Domination Enterprises, released in 1988 by Mute Records' subsidiary label Product Inc. World Dom guitarist/singer Keith Dobson re-released it on CD with bonus tracks in 2009 on his label Free Love Records.

== Songs ==
"Message for You People" opens side one with a thud reminiscent of a blowing speaker or depth charge explosion, then a pulsing bassline followed by "drums and blistering guitar noise." According to Wyndham Wallace of The Quietus wrote that Dobsons' guitar in the song "forever redefines concepts of ‘industrial’ music." According to Trouser Press, "[t]he astonishing high-pressure racket of Let's Play Domination's opening salvo ("Message for You People") may send you rushing to the turntable to see if your stylus is accidentally gouging a hole in the platter."

"Ghetto Queen" and "Blu Money", the latter featuring a refrain of "I blew money that I could've bought drugs with," have been described as "ghetto punk" in their musical style. Side two of the album is more downtempo. "The Bullit Man" is followed by "The Stack Blew Jack," possibly intentionally placed next to each other in the album "as they follow the same exact start/stop blueprint and melody scheme."

== Reception ==
Professional ratings
Review scores
Source	Rating
Trouser Press	favourable

It was included at number 89 in Alternative Press' list of the top 99 albums from 1985 to 1995. Dusted magazine wrote that "Let's Play Domination proves World Domination Enterprises had it in the mid to late 1980s, an era when a lot of people lost it, or never found it in the first place." In 2009, John Doran of the NME included the album in the magazine's "Unspun Heroes" series where the writers "[dig] up buried treasure from the depths of our collection." He called the band "truly radical post-punkers" and said that "World Domination Enterprises didn’t just bite the hand that fed. They gnawed the fingers off, chewed the bone, cartilage, skin and blood and then spat the mess back in the owner’s face." The same year, Wyndham Wallace of The Quietus wrote that:

"It was a noise like no other, wrapped around a skeletal framework of punk, dub, rockabilly, reggae, hip hop and pop. Even now, some twenty years later, nothing comes close to the sheer physical, brutal force in every sinew, cartilage and muscle right at the very heart of Let’s Play Domination, the 1988 debut album from World Domination Enterprises. Of the many and varied noise records that I have bought or had brought to my attention before and since — Sonic Youth, My Bloody Valentine, Health, Keiji Haino, Lightning Bolt — few provoke such extreme reactions from friends: it's either total, desperate terror or saucer-eyed shock and awe. Nothing shreds my speakers so regularly at such volume; its overpowering, monstrous immensity is a source of relief, a panacea for frustration, a primitive, deafening howl."

== Track List ==
All songs written by World Domination Enterprises (Keith Dobson, Steve Jameson, Digger Metters) unless otherwise indicated. The use of uppercase and lowercase letters are as they appear on the back cover and labels of the original Product Inc. LP and CD.

Side 1
No.	Title	Writer(s)	Length
1.	"Message for you people"	Keith Dobson	4:20
2.	"blu money"		2:27
3.	"Trouble Enough"		3:21
4.	"I can't live without my Radio" (LL Cool J cover)	James Todd Smith/Rick Rubin	3:30
5.	"Look out Jack"		1:24
6.	"Hotsy Girl"		1:39
7.	"Ghetto Queen"		2:46

Side 2
No.	Title	Writer(s)	Length
1.	"Asbestos lead Asbestos"	Keith Dobson	2:46
2.	"That woman"	Keith Dobson	1:59
3.	"Jah Jah Call You" (U-Roy cover)	U-Roy/Prince Jazzbo	4:54
4.	"Ragamuffin Man"		2:23
5.	"The bullit Man"		2:30
6.	"the Stack blew Jack"		1:22
7.	"Funkytown" (Lipps Inc. cover)	Steve Greenberg	2:36

2006 Product Inc. CD bonus tracks
No.	Title	Writer(s)	Length
15.	"Catalogue clothes" (From the 1986 12" single)		3:00
16.	"St. Etienne" (AKA "Dans une ville comme St. Etienne"; B-side of the "Catalogue clothes" 12" single)	Keith Dobson	2:09
17.	"I can't live without my Radio (Total mix)" (7" single edit version)	James Todd Smith/Rick Rubin	3:42

2009 Free Love CD bonus tracks
No.	Title	Writer(s)	Length
15.	"Catalogue clothes" (From the 1986 12" single)		2:55
16.	"Hotsy Girl" (Edited version of the Trashdown Mix, from the 1987 7" single)		1:40
17.	"Radio" ("I can't live without my Radio (Total mix)" 7" single edit version)	James Todd Smith/Rick Rubin	3:15
18.	"The Company News" (From the 1989 7"/12" single)		3:56
19.	"Do Do Go Go" (Previously unreleased demo)		3:46

The Product Inc. LP and CD both include a thank-you message from Dobson at the very end, hence the difference in run time of the 7" version of "Radio" between the two CD releases.
