= Actual Sounds + Voices =

Studio album by Meat Beat Manifesto
- Released: 30 June 1998
- Recorded: 1997–98
- Genres: Big beat; electro-industrial; breakbeat; electronica; IDM; nu jazz; experimental; ambient
- Length: 72:58
- Label: Nothing Records
- Producer: Meat Beat Manifesto

Meat Beat Manifesto chronology
Subliminal Sandwich (1996)	Actual Sounds + Voices (1998)	RUOK? (2002)

Professional ratings
Review scores
Source	Rating
AllMusic	4/5 stars
Pitchfork	8.5/10
Tom Hull – on the Web	B+
Uncut	3/5 stars

Actual Sounds + Voices is the sixth studio album by electronic music group Meat Beat Manifesto, released in 1998.

Like its predecessor, Subliminal Sandwich, the album deeply intertwines multiple forms of electronic music with live instruments such as the bass clarinet, saxophone, drums and Fender Rhodes. However, Actual Sounds + Voices is more influenced by jazz, coupled with a darker tone and characterized by persistent erratic breakbeats. "The Thumb" is a lengthy jazz fusion song featuring Bennie Maupin and Patrick Gleeson, both veterans of Herbie Hancock's early 1970s band.

== Track listing ==
1. "Everything's Under Control"—0:43
2. "Prime Audio Soup"—6:17
3. "Book of Shadows"—5:43
4. "Oblivion/Humans"—5:52
5. "Let's Have Fun"—3:30
6. "The Tweek"—2:25
7. "Acid Again"—5:47
8. "Let Go"—4:44
9. "Where Are You?/Enuff"—5:59
10. "Hail to the Bopp"—4:40
11. "3 Floors Above You"—5:00
12. "Funny Feeling"—6:10
13. "The Thumb"—10:47
14. "Wavy Line"—1:17
15. "Wildlife"—4:05

== Personnel ==
- Jack Dangers - producer, vocals, bass
- Lynn Farmer - drums, percussion
- John Wilson - prepared guitars

Additional musicians

- Bennie Maupin - saxophones, bass clarinet on "The Thumb"
- Patrick Gleeson - synthesizer on "The Thumb"

== In popular culture ==
The single "Prime Audio Soup" is featured in a scene of the 1999 film The Matrix and appears on the film's soundtrack.

It also appears in the 2002 documentary film The Smashing Machine: The Life and Times of Extreme Fighter Mark Kerr.
