= At the Center =

Studio album by Meat Beat Manifesto
- Released: 24 May 2005
- Genres: Nu jazz, breakbeat, house
- Length: 56:41
- Label: Thirsty Ear THI57159.2
- Producer: Jack Dangers

Meat Beat Manifesto chronology
Storm the Studio RMXS (2003)	At the Center (2005)	Autoimmune (2008)

Professional ratings
Review scores
Source	Rating
AllMusic	3.5/5 stars
The Guardian	3/5 stars
Pitchfork	7.1/10
Tiny Mix Tapes	3.5/5 stars
Tom Hull – on the Web	B+

At the Center is an album by Meat Beat Manifesto, released in 2005 as part of the "Blue Series" of Thirsty Ear records fusing jazz with electronica.

Jazz elements had been featured in occasional Meat Beat Manifesto songs over the years, but At the Center is the first outright jazz album in the group's catalog, with bandleader Jack Dangers' collaborators being a trio of prominent jazz players. The album is mostly funk- and fusion-oriented, with a few abstract or free-jazz leaning songs. It consists of instrumentals but has some scattered vocal samples, notably on two songs featuring vintage recordings of poet Lawrence Ferlinghetti reading newspaper classified advertisements (the album's notes misidentify Ferlinghetti as Kenneth Rexroth).

At the Center earned mostly positive reviews from critics of both jazz and electronic music. However, Dangers opted to not continue his exploration of jazz on subsequent Meat Beat Manifesto albums.

== Credits ==
Musicians

- David King: Drums, percussion
- Peter Gordon: Flute
- Craig Taborn: Steinway grand piano, Fender Rhodes electric piano, clavinet, Hammond B3 organ
- Jack Dangers: Bass, Bass flute, Bass clarinet, "everything else" (i.e., samples, synthesizer, shortwave radio, percussion, etc.).
- Kenneth Rexroth reading the want ads recorded by Henry Jacobs for KPFA, 1957. Courtesy of Henry Jacobs.

Technical personnel

- Artwork and Album Design: Robert Beam
- Producer and engineer: Jack Dangers

== Track listing ==
1. "Wild" – 5:18
2. "Flute Thang" – 4:47
3. "Murita Cycles" – 4:13
4. "Want Ads One" – 4:27
  - Voice: Lawrence Ferlinghetti
5. "Blind" – 5:16
6. "Musica Classica" – 3:34
7. "Bohemian Grove" – 5:20
8. "United Nations ETC. ETC." – 3:57
9. "Want Ads Two" – 4:25
  - Voice: Lawrence Ferlinghetti
10. "The Water Margin" – 6:34
11. "Shotgun! (Blast to the Brain)" – 4:59
12. "Granulation 1" – 3:51
