= Discount Home Shoppers' Club =

Discount Home Shoppers' Club, Inc.
- Founded: 1997
- Founder: Richard Burke
- Headquarters: Englewood, Florida
- Key people: Will Burke, Fabrizio Perotti, Giuseppe Francavilla

Discount Home Shoppers' Club, Inc. (DHS Club) is an American company based in Englewood, Florida. It was formed and incorporated in June 1997 by its founder and CEO, Richard Burke.

The DHS Club is a multi-business operation that consists of the ClubShop Mall (online shopping), Glocal Income (affiliate marketing), Glocal Generation (personalized networking), DHS Club Kids (non-profit organization), Ducks Nest Retreat (cabin rentals) and ClubShop Rewards (customer loyalty reward program).

== History ==
The DHS Club was founded in 1997 by Richard Burke, in an apartment over his garage. Soon after, the DHS Club started hiring employees and moved into a small office in Englewood, Florida. To establish a membership base, Burke recruited his oldest son Will Burke and his friend Paul Spence to become DHS Club independent sales representatives (VIP Members). The DHS Club incentivised VIP membership by offering residual income opportunities through member referrals, along with discounts on selected products and services.

One of the first main products the DHS Club had to offer at a discount was the Web TV. By 2000 the DHS Club had created an online shopping mall for their DHS Club Members that rewarded their members back with cash back rebates. ClubShop Mall online stores included Best Buy, Wal-Mart, Amazon and Dell.

By 2001, The DHS Club had over 1 million people join the DHS Club's online shopping mall and affiliate marketing programme.

In 2002, The DHS Club launched, ClubBucks Rewards, an offline shopping rewards program with participating merchants, so that members could get discounts and loyalty points. The DHS Club also purchased around 20 acres (81,000 m^{2}) of land in Southeast Tennessee and created a corporate retreat property and cabin rental property.

In December 2006, the DHS Club and ClubShop Mall were featured on the American television show, The World's Greatest.

By the end of 2007, ClubShop Malls were opened in the Netherlands Antilles, Malaysia and Suriname.

=== From DHS Club to Clubshop ===
In 2009 all business operations were unified under the Clubshop brand.

Outside the United States, the Club experienced growth in countries such as Italy, France, the Netherlands, and Belgium.

The members base kept growing up to nine million members.

Thousands of online and offline stores in the five continents became Clubshop Rewards Merchant Affiliates.

In 2018 the Clubshop brand was acquired by Proprofit Worldwide Ltd.

Proprofit is a marketing company founded in 2013 by Fabrizio Perotti and Giuseppe Francavilla, the Clubshop Executive Directors who successfully developed the DHS-Club and Clubshop brands in Italy from 2001 to 2012.

Since 2018, Clubshop has undertaken a business restructuring process intended to restore operations and growth to levels seen in the early 2000s.

== Controversy ==
In the early 2000s, DHS Club policy allowed DHS Club VIP members to sign up people for free to become DHS Club members. With this policy making it so easy to sign up new members, a few DHS Club VIP Members took advantage of the policy by signing people up to be DHS Club members without their consent. As a result, the DHS Club was put on many blacklists by spam prevention groups such as Spamhaus to prevent the DHS Club from sending email and DHS Club revenues dropped 70%. A Spamhaus spokesman said that spam played a major role in the club's success. In 2002, the DHS Club created a policy against spamming, and instituted a double opt-in process for all membership requests, to prevent anyone from being registered as a DHS Club member without expressly confirming their membership request.
