= Davis High School =

Davis High School or Davis Senior High School can refer to:

- A.B. Davis High School, former high school in Mount Vernon, New York
- A.C. Davis High School (Washington) in Yakima, Washington
- Ben Davis High School in Indianapolis, Indiana
- Benjamin O. Davis High School in Harris County, Texas
- Davis Aerospace High School, in Detroit, Michigan
- Davis High School (Oklahoma) in Davis, Oklahoma
- Davis High School (now Northside High School) in Houston, Texas
- Davis High School (Utah) in Kaysville, Utah
- Davis Senior High School (California) in Davis, California
- Grace M. Davis High School in Modesto, California
- Jeff Davis High School in Hazlehurst, Georgia
- Jefferson Davis High School (Montgomery, Alabama) in Montgomery, Alabama
- Lee Davis High School in Mechanicsville, Hanover County, Virginia
- Oregon-Davis Junior-Senior High School in Hamlet, Indiana

== See also ==
- Davis County Community High School in Bloomfield, Iowa
- Fort Davis High School in Fort Davis, Texas
