= RUOK? (album) =

Studio album by Meat Beat Manifesto
- Released: 14 October 2002
- Genre: Breakbeat, electronica, dub
- Length: 61:15
- Label: Run Recordings
- Producer: Jack Dangers

Meat Beat Manifesto chronology
Actual Sounds + Voices (1998)	RUOK? (2002)	Storm the Studio R.M.X.S. (2003)

Professional ratings
Aggregate scores
Source	Rating
Metacritic	68/100
Review scores
Source	Rating
AllMusic	4/5 stars
Alternative Press	4/5 stars
Q	3/5 stars
Uncut	3.5/5 stars
URB	4/5 stars

RUOK? is a 2002 album by the British industrial techno group Meat Beat Manifesto. Some editions included the mini Enhanced CD Free Piece Suite. The album was recorded at Tape Lab Studios in California and was mastered at The Exchange in London. It features the rare EMS Synthi 100 synthesizer.

"Horn of Jericho" was re-released as "Matron" on Battersea Shield (EP).

== Track listing ==
1. "Yüri" - 5:38
2. "Spinning Round" - 5:26
3. "Horn of Jericho" - 7:10
4. "What Does It All Mean?" - 5:20
5. "No Words Necessary" - 4:41
6. "Intermission" - 1:07
7. "Supersoul" - 5:35
8. "Handkerchief Head" - 6:35
9. "No Echo in Space" - 6:26
10. "Dynamite Fresh" - 5:41
11. "Retrograde" - 4:57
12. "Happiness Supreme" - 2:39

LP version (QS140) has only eight tracks with different order: 1; 2; 4; 8; 3; 7; 11; 9
