= Azeem (rapper) =

- Born: Azeem Ismail; New Brunswick, New Jersey
- Genres: Hip hop
- Occupations: Rapper, playwright
- Years active: 1991–present
- Website: www.thepoetazeem.com

Azeem Ismail, better known simply as Azeem is a hip-hop rapper and performance poet, residing in Brooklyn, New York.

== Biography ==
Azeem, born of Jamaican and Panamanian descent started his first band, Telefunken, in 1991, which was a combination of live instrumentation and hip-hop. Their first release came out in 1994 on the then newly formed Om Records.

Azeem's first break as a solo artist came at an open mic competition where he performed under the alias the "Invisible Man" against fifty other poets and lyricists for a spot on the Lollapolooza Tour.

This led to a PBS special (United States of Poetry) with Washington Square Films, and two book publishings.

In 1997, Azeem was hired by Bay Area artist, Michael Franti (The Disposable Heroes of Hiphoprisy and Spearhead) to assist him in composing songs for the second Spearhead album, Chocolate Supa Highway. This led to Azeem touring, writing, and performing with the band for two years. The single "Keep Me Lifted", a song that features Azeem, was the only song from the album to reach Billboard's Rap Charts.

In 1999, after his third tour with Spearhead, Azeem left to work as solo. 1999 saw the release of his first solo EP Garage Opera (Heratik), and he contributed a track to Afro-Mystik's Future Tropic album. Azeem followed up with the full-length album Craft Classic (Stray). The album's single "Rubber Glue" reached number two on the CMJ radio rap chart.

In 2003 Azeem released the 12-inch single "Family Man" (Bomb Hip-Hop) and toured Europe with the Bomb Hip-Hop Tour.

In early 2004 Azeem was the frontman on the VU release Mayhemystics (Wide Hive), which was nominated for a California Music Award.

In 2005 Azeem wrote and performed a play called Rude Boy. Azeem plays the character of Johnny Burke, a struggling and slightly disturbed "Jamerican" (Jamaican-American) who works as a janitor. The play is set at Johnny's place of work, a Mexican cardboard box factory. Azeem performed Rude Boy at: The Lincoln Center - NYC, Marsh Theater - SF, Oaklandish - Oakland, Hip Hop Theater Festival (Brava Theater)- SF, San Francisco Theater Fest - Yerba Buena Gardens San Francisco, Redline Theater - Chicago IL. He also produced and directed The Secret Circus, a performance art show at the Marsh Berkeley.

In 2008, Azeem released another solo effort Air Cartoons,

In 2010, Azeem performed live with Heavyweight Dub Champion.

== Discography ==
=== Albums ===
Artist	Title	Year	Label
Azeem	Garaga Opera	2000	Heratik
Azeem	Craft Classic	2001	Stray
Azeem with Variable Unit	Mayhemystics	2004	Wide Hive
Azeem	Show Business	2004	Bomb Hip-Hop
Zeph & Azeem	Rise Up	2007	Om
Azeem	Air Cartoons	2008	Oaklyn
Azeem, Ancient Astronauts	Broken Puppets	2017	Switchstance Recordings

=== Singles and EPs ===
Artist	Title	Year	Label
Azeem vs. Hydroponic Sound System	Family Man	2002	Bomb Hip-Hop

=== Other appearances ===
- Afro Mystic (1999), Om Records - "Shoplift The Future" and "Trivia Terrorist"
- Spearhead (1997), Capitol - "Keep Me Lifted", "Food for the Masses" and "Madness in the Hood"
- Groove Active (1997), Om Records - "The Message" (Telefunken)
- Grand Slam CD — Azeem the Invisible Man
