= Perennial Divide =

British electronic music band

Perennial Divide was a British electronic music band, formed in 1986 by Jack Dangers, Jonny Stephens, Andy Ward, Paul Freegard and Steve Searley. It was relatively short-lived; Dangers and Stephens left it in 1988 to form Meat Beat Manifesto.

== Discography ==
=== Burndown 12" vinyl (1986) ===
1. "New Foundation of Mankind" – 5:51
2. "The Permanent Way" – 5:13

=== Purge LP (1986; only 2000 copies pressed) ===
1. "Blow" – 5:52
2. "Parricide" – 2:08
3. "Word of the Lord" – 4:18
4. "Captain Swing" – 4:29
5. "Rescue" – 4:56
6. "The Fall" – 5:32
7. "Trip" – 6:07
8. "Tuna Hell" – 1:51
9. "Burning Dogs" – 3:47
10. "End of the Line" – 5:07

=== Beehead EP (1987) ===
1. "Bee Head" – 4:38 (produced by XTC's Andy Partridge)
2. "World Spread" – 5:27 (Produced by Johnny Pegg)
3. "Gentle as a Fawn Is Warm" – 4:05 (Produced by Johnny Pegg)
4. "Clamp" – 0:39 (Produced by Johnny Pegg)

=== Leathernecks (1988; test 12") ===
1. "Monster" – 5:59
2. "Leathernecks" – 3:58
3. (untitled) – 1:20
