= Storm the Studio =

Studio album by Meat Beat Manifesto
- Released: 20 February 1989
- Studios: The Slaughterhouse, South Yorkshire; F2 Studios, London; Drive Studios
- Genres: Breakbeat; electronic; industrial
- Length: 71:49
- Labels: Sweatbox; Wax Trax!
- Producer: Jack Dangers

Meat Beat Manifesto chronology
Storm the Studio (1989)	Armed Audio Warfare (1990)

Storm the Studio is the debut album by English electronic music group Meat Beat Manifesto, released on 20 February 1989 by Sweatbox Records in the United Kingdom and later that year by Wax Trax! in the United States. Recorded in three recording studios, the album contains four compositions, each split into separate parts, that mostly originated as twelve-inch singles the band released in 1988. The record's inventive musical style features elements of industrial music, electro, dub, noise rock and hip hop music, and incorporates breakbeats, noise and sporadic rap vocals. The group also incorporated heavy usage of sampling in a fashion they compared to pop art. Television was a further influence on the record, and numerous items of television dialogue appear throughout Storm the Studio as samples.

Named for a William S. Burroughs quote sampled on the album, Storm the Studio was greeted with critical acclaim upon release, and its dark tone helped distance Meat Beat Manifesto from the hedonistic dance music of the time. It has gone on to be considered a groundbreaking and innovative album, and has influenced numerous artists in the industrial, breakbeat, drum and bass and trip hop genres. It was re-released by TVT Records in 1993, Mute Records in 1994 and Run Recordings in 2003. A remix album, containing new remixes of the Storm the Studio by artists such as DJ Spooky and Jonah Sharp, was released by Tino Corp as Storm the Studio RMXS in 2003.

== Background and recording ==
Swindon-based Meat Beat Manifesto began in 1987 when Jack Dangers and Jonny Stephens of the pop group Perennial Divide – who they had formed in 1986 and recorded the album Purge (1986) with – began releasing electronic side-project twelve-inch singles under the Meat Beat Manifesto name on Perennial Divide's label Sweatbox Records, the first of which was "Suck Hard" (1987). These were followed by the singles which later formed the basis of Storm the Studio, namely "I Got the Fear", "Strap Down" and "God O.D." After Perennial Divide's dissolution, the newly prioritised Meat Beat Manifesto began recording their debut album soon after, naming the projected album Armed Audio Warfare and scheduling its release for May 1988, but the tapes were destroyed in a studio fire before the album could be released. Though the story was something of a rumour for many years, Jack Dangers confirmed the story of the fire in a 2010 interview.

The band recorded Storm the Studio, their replacement debut album, at The Slaughterhouse in South Yorkshire, F2 Studios in London and at Drive Studios. It was mixed and mastered at London's Townhouse Studios. The Sound Defence Policy, presumably a pseudonym for Dangers, is credited for the album's production. Nix Lowrey The Quietus later noted how the material on Storm the Studio was rumoured to be the subsequent resurrection and "reshaping" of the material destroyed in the fire, although the band recreated what their debut album was supposed to have been like on their second album Armed Audio Warfare (1990), which takes its name from the proposed debut album and among its tracks includes alternate versions of several of the songs on Storm the Studio, some in the form of remixes and others in the form of unreleased original versions.

== Composition ==
=== Production ===
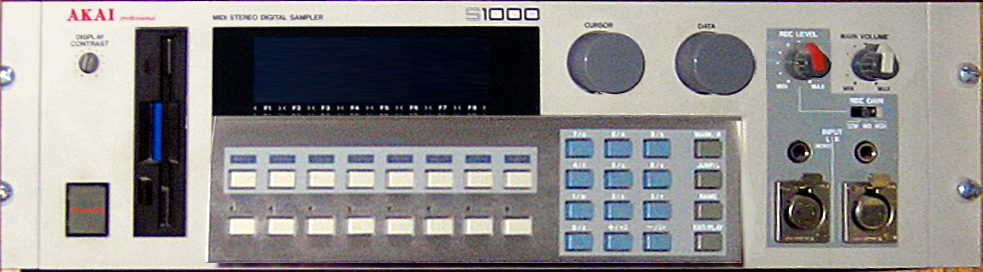
An Akai S1000 was used in the production of the album's samples.

Storm the Studio makes heavy usage of sampling, with samples being collected onto a Casio DA1 DAT machine and then moved to a fully expanded Akai S1000. Band member Marcus Adams explained that unlike contemporaneous artists who use sampling, who Adams felt were doing it "because it's hip [...] because Public Enemy do it," Meat Beat Manifesto used sampling "because it's a magpie thing [...] it's like pop art. The pop artists used to take other peoples' work and make it into their own, and we see sampling as doing that, we don't see it as 'we'll use that because it's a hip sound at the moment'."

Rather than primarily use music as a source for samples and influence, Storm the Studio was influenced by television and uses numerous samples of television shows and news items. According to Adams, the band would occasionally "get a track ready on the sampler so that we can sync that with the timecode, then the sampler is cued in so that when you play a record or tune in the television and as the track is running on, we can make samples which immediately go in time with the track." This allowed the band to capture certain television dialogue samples and edit them unit they were in sync with the track. One journalist noted that "[t]he way in which Dangers and Adams generate samples incorporates a random element - this makes it stranger still that the samples seem so carefully chosen." Jack Dangers enjoyed sampling sources that much of their audience would recognise, hence the appearance of a sample of a Michael Jackson song. The album was also the band's first release to use vocoders.

The group enjoyed experimenting with different sounds to see which would be worth incorporating into the final product. Adams recorded the squeak of his sneaker on the ground, then sampled it and slowed it down, but he felt it "sounded really stupid" so did not use it on the album. The usage of a sample from children's series Rainbow, in which Zippy says "You're supposed to listen to the rhythm George, the rhythm of the music," was explained by Adams: "There's not much else you can do when you're on the dole except watch Rainbow." The band taped every episode of the show for three years looking for the particular scene so they could sample it. Another of the album's television-sourced samples, a news broadcaster saying "a spokesman at the Health Ministry said that to talk repeatedly about AIDS would cause the public to panic, tourism will certainly be affected," was the result of what the group called a 'random edit,' although they kept it on the album because they felt it showed how the news "sounded like they were more concerned with tourism than peoples' lives. It was something that would make you think, rather than the 'DJ get on down' stuff."

=== Musical style ===
Three of the band's early singles, namely "God O.D.", "Strap Down" and "I Got the Fear", as well as the new composition "Re-Animator", feature on Storm the Studio disassembled and remixed into four separate parts each, with the exception of "Strap Down", which only has three parts. Each of the four pieces are intended to fill one side of the double vinyl. Trouser Press wrote that the album stretches "the concept of the remix further than most," finding few of the tracks on the album to sound similar to any of the record's other tracks, with Matthew Jeanes of Brainwashed echoing that "most of the record works through free association to connect the dots." Describing its musical style, Trouser Press felt the album took "the groundbreaking electronic grooves" of Cabaret Voltaire and Throbbing Gristle as its base and significantly toughened them up, sporadically adding raps in a stream-of-consciousness style. Band founder Jack Dangers explained: "If you listen to Storm The Studio, there's vocals for all of the songs, but there are 4 different versions of each and not so many vocals on the other versions."

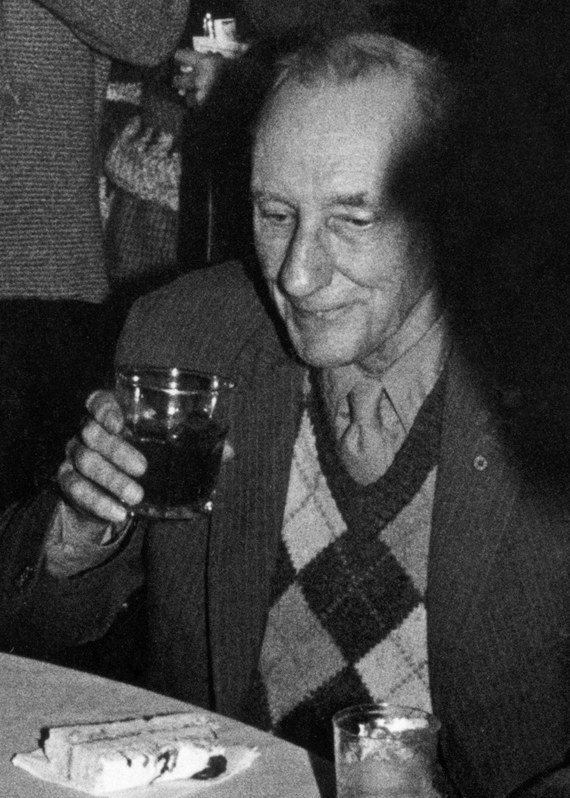
The album is named for a sample of William S. Burroughs saying "Storm the studio" which appears at the start of the album.

Andy Hermann of PopMatters wrote that people were unable to pigeonhole the album into a single genre successfully, writing that it was referred to by different people upon release as an industrial, acid house, techno or hip hop album. Similarly, Ron Nachmann of SF Weekly said the album disregarded "the genre rules of the time" in its combination of hip hop breakbeats, scratch edits, bulky samples, electro tone, dub techniques and "industrial attitude." John Bush of AllMusic felt the album combined the styles of noise rock, hip hop and "high-energy dub," while Robert Christgau made note of the "industrial-strength samples", "annihilating rhythm" and occasional detours into electro dance. Matthew Jeanes of Brainwashed said the album "runs the gamut from funky breaks to outright noise."

Although a thread runs through all four parts of the record's opening track "God O.D.", the piece changes drastically throughout, with the ending of Part 4 bearing no resemblance to Part 1. The composition is noisy and funky, with the lyrics "It's genocide, can't you see?/Genocide in the first degree" being shouted by the band's then-vocalist Johnny Stephens. The first part of "Re-Animator" is a funky club track containing vocals, whereas by the fourth part, the piece has transformed into a psychedelic dub style incorporating "half-time rhythm layers of tape noise, reverberating voices, and feedback," with Jeanes noting that "[s]ometimes a bass line or a sample repeats, other times, it doesn't."

"Strap Down" begins with drums that have been compared to machine guns and numerous loops that one reviewer felt "[sound] like a marching band fighting with a circus over a breakbeat." Several minutes of bass bursts, changes in rhythm the repetition of the title phrase follow, followed thereafter by the drastically different, seven-minute second part of the piece, which keeps to a fast tempo. At the six-minute mark, this part is starkly altered by the introduction of a self-described "annihilating rhythm." "I Got the Fear" repeats phrases from previous tracks, such as "reanimate" and "re-animator", turning the album "into a kind of mobius strip of samples and themes" in the words of Jeanes, who commented that "If Jack Dangers isn't literally sampling himself here, he is quite figuratively doing it by recycling his own ideas from one track to the next without any regard for which sounds or ideas belong to which songs."

== Release ==
In the United Kingdom, Storm the Studio was released on 20 February 1989 by Sweatbox Records, a label who signed the group after they presented them with some demo recordings. In the United States, it was released by Wax Trax!, which led to the group being regarded as an industrial band, despite Dangers' and Jonny Stephens' dislike for being pigeonholed. Dangers later told one interviewer he was not concerned by the labelling, as he felt "industrial" meant different things in different countries. He later said that when he moved to the United States, "industrial was like Ministry, Front Line Assembly, Nine Inch Nails. I just didn't get it, there were too many guitars. Industrial to me is Einstürzende Neubauten, Test Dept, SPK. I love those bands; if we're only connected to that light, great. It was mainly the Wax Trax thing, because we were licensed to Wax Trax. We weren't on Wax Trax anywhere else in the world. It was only here."

Storm the Studio features artwork designed by the agency Accident, and was named after one of the album's samples, a clip of postmodernist writer William S. Burroughs declaring "Storm the studio," which is used as the start of "God O.D. (Part 1)". "Strap Down (Part 3)" was only made available on the vinyl editions and later the digital edition, with the song being removed from CD and cassette releases. Regardless, American CD releases have incorrectly listed Part 3 on the sleeve. The album had become out of print after several years, leading to the album's CD re-release in the United States by TVT Records in 1993 and by Mute Records in 1994, the latter time with different artwork, designed by Rich Borge. Storm the Studio and Armed Audio Warfare were re-released again by Run Recordings on 22 July 2003, newly remastered by Jack Dangers and again with redesigned album sleeves by Rich Borge."

== Critical reception ==
Professional ratings
Review scores
Source	Rating
AllMusic	4.5/5 stars
Spin Alternative Record Guide	8/10
Tom Hull – on the Web	B+
The Village Voice	B+

Upon release, Storm the Studio received acclaim from music critics and was praised for its distinctive style. Writing for The Village Voice, Robert Christgau wrote that, "Bill Burroughs having given the word, these Brit art-schoolers shape two years of 12-inches into four sides of industrial-strength samples and 'annihilating rhythm.' And though they do sometimes settle for electrodance, the laughs and abrasions keep on coming."

Among retrospective reviews, Matthew Jeanes of Brainwashed noted that although Storm the Studio was "released on the cusp of the DJ record/remix fetish of the 1990s," when maxi-singles containing numerous remixes of the A-side were commonplace, Storm the Studio was "about as far from a remix 12" as possible" despite only listing four songs, citing this as one of several enigmatic qualities to the album. He wrote that "somehow getting lost" in the album makes a degree of sense, given that the record "is constantly folding in on itself from different direction," and also found that the album's eclectic style and "memorable lead ins" transformed the album into "the perfect DJ tool except for the fact that it's almost impossible to know what the record is going to sound like wherever you drop the needle. I love that this record takes so many strange turns, even if I've never known quite how to navigate through them."

John Bush of AllMusic called the album a "four-track mini-album" and noted the influence of dub and hip hop on the remixes, while also stating that the album is "just as dense and sample-heavy" as the original singles created by the band. Jason Josephes of Pitchfork later called the album a "sheer work of genius." Dutch magazine OOR ranked the album at number 25 in their list of the 50 best albums of 1989, while in 1994, Nieuwe Revu ranked the album at number 62 in its list of the "Top 100 Albums of All Time." In 2006, VPRO named the album as one of the 299 greatest albums of all time, and in 2014, Rockdelux named the album as one of the 500 greatest albums released between 1984–2004. The album is also celebrated in a brief blurb included in the liner notes of the compilation box set Black Box – Wax Trax! Records: The First 13 Years (1994).

== Legacy ==
Storm the Studio has been hailed as groundbreaking and innovative by music critics. The album was released when "house and techno ruled the dancefloor" in the words of Ron Nachmann of SF Weekly, who wrote that Storm the Studio marked a change in that it "put said dance floor on notice" with a message that "simplistic hedonism was dead." He wrote that the album's titular William S. Burroughs sample upended the "get down" paradigm of dance music and "urged listeners to seize the means of production, to create chaos, to do something." He also described the album as having "blasted the genre rules of the time, boosting hip hop breakbeats, substantive samples, scratch edits, and electro flavor with dub technique and industrial attitude." Andy Hermann of PopMatters, who called the album genuinely "seminal", wrote that the album's musical style was so unprecedented that critics found it hard to write about:

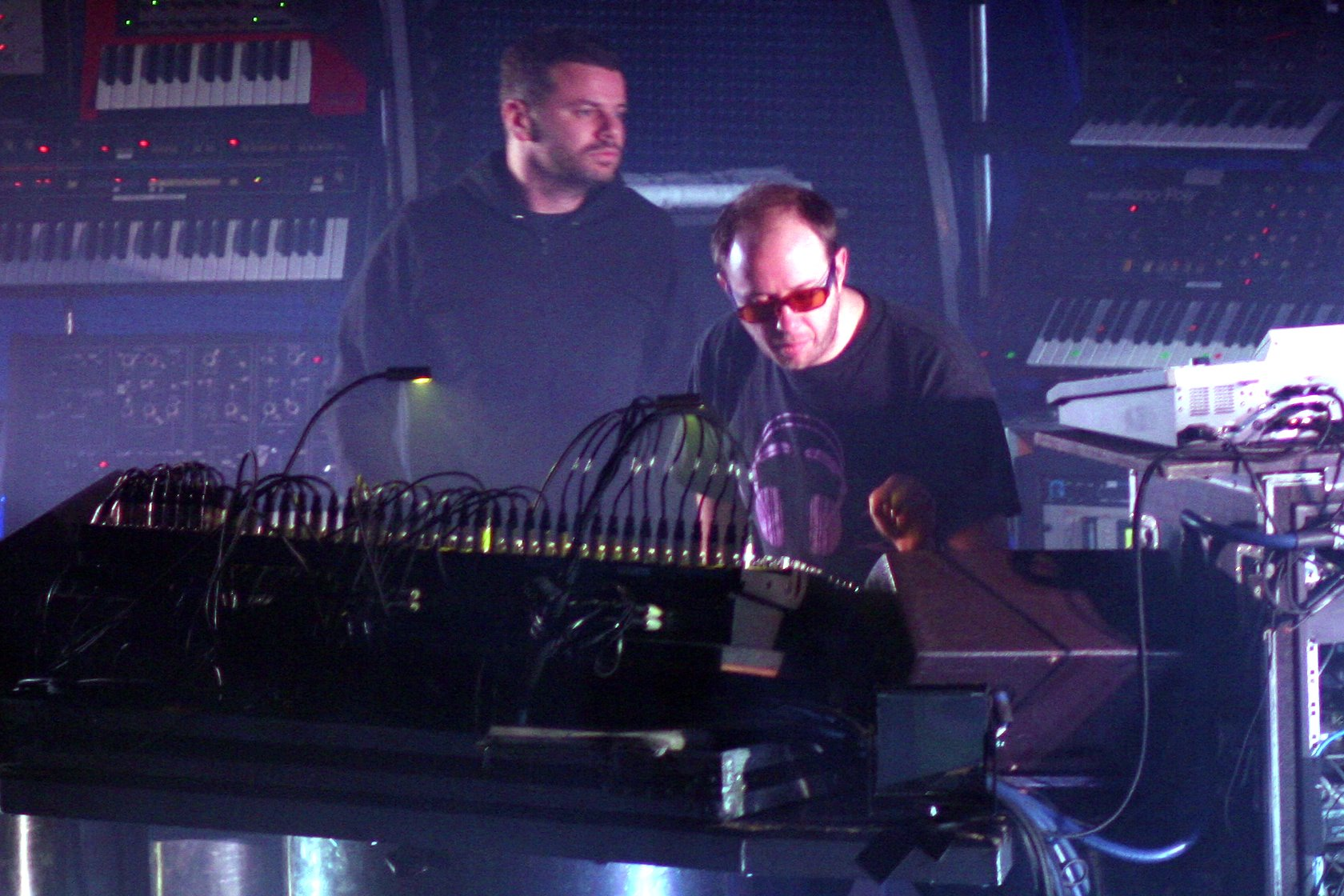
Storm the Studio influenced The Chemical Brothers' musical approach.

"We music critics are a little too fond of the word "seminal", but once in awhile we actually apply it to something worthy of the term. Take Meat Beat Manifesto’s 1989 debut album Storm the Studio, which is about as seminal as it gets, a release so groundbreaking and forward-thinking that when it first came out, no one really had the vocabulary to describe it. People called it industrial, techno, acid house, even hip-hop, which seems ridiculous in retrospect, but terms like darkcore, breakbeat, trip-hop, and that most heinous of genre names, IDM, hadn't been invented yet, so there was simply no way to pigeonhole Jack Dangers' and Jonny Stephens' dark, restless, sample-laden soundscapes."

The album has proven influential, with Alex Veronac of Release Magazine writing that the album affected many musicians and producers in the techno, noise, industrial and dance scenes, while William Tilland of AllMusic wrote that the album's "heavy, pounding mix of dub, hip-hop, and incipient techno impulses" were influential on many drum and bass and trip hop artists which emerged throughout the 1990s. Quinn Morrison Vice wrote that the "seminal" album remains "a truly major milestone of breaks-based electronica." He stated that: "The influence of this record cannot be overestimated. Without it, the music of everyone from Nine Inch Nails to the Chemical Brothers to Fatboy Slim just wouldn't be the same." Nix Lowrey of The Quietus noted the album's influence on the Chemical Brothers' debut album Exit Planet Dust (1995).

A remix album of newly commissioned remixes of the Storm the Studio material, Storm the Studio RMXS, was released by Tino Corp on 23 September 2003. Those remixing the material on the album include Eight Frozen Modules, Merzbow and Frank Bretschneider, English producers Scanner and Jonah Sharp, and American producers DJ Spooky, DJ Swamp and The Opus. Meat Beat Manifesto have continued playing material live from the album; for their 2008 tour, which included accompanying visuals, Dangers tracked down the television clips that were used on the Storm the Studio material on the set list. During the band's sets, the accompanying visuals to the samples were displayed on-screen. The band would continue to use the visuals in later performances of the material. In 2008, Dangers described Storm the Studio as "a part of me," despite admitting he rarely plays the album.

== Track listing ==
All songs written by Jack Dangers

1. "God O.D. (Part 1)" – 5:19
2. "God O.D. (Part 2)" – 6:42
3. "God O.D. (Part 3)" – 5:21
4. "God O.D. (Part 4)" – 2:55
5. "Re-Animator (Part 1)" – 6:06
6. "Re-Animator (Part 2)" – 4:08
7. "Re-Animator (Part 3)" – 5:30
8. "Re-Animator (Part 4)" – 4:00
9. "Strap Down (Part 1)" – 5:49
10. "Strap Down (Part 2)" – 6:59
11. "Strap Down (Part 3)" – 8:02 (vinyl only)
12. "I Got the Fear (Part 1)" – 6:14
13. "I Got the Fear (Part 2)" – 3:59
14. "I Got the Fear (Part 3)" – 3:06
15. "I Got the Fear (Part 4)" – 5:21

The version of "Strap Down (Part 3)" on the remastered album on Bandcamp removes the long unadorned sample of Rev. Jimmie Rodgers Snow preaching against rock 'n' roll in 1956 from the beginning, reducing its length to 7:42. The music is otherwise unaffected.

== Personnel ==
- Jack Dangers – writing
- Accident – sleeve design
- The Sound Defence Policy – production
- Simon Collins – live drum samples on 'God O.D.'
