= Meat Beat Manifesto =

British electronic music group

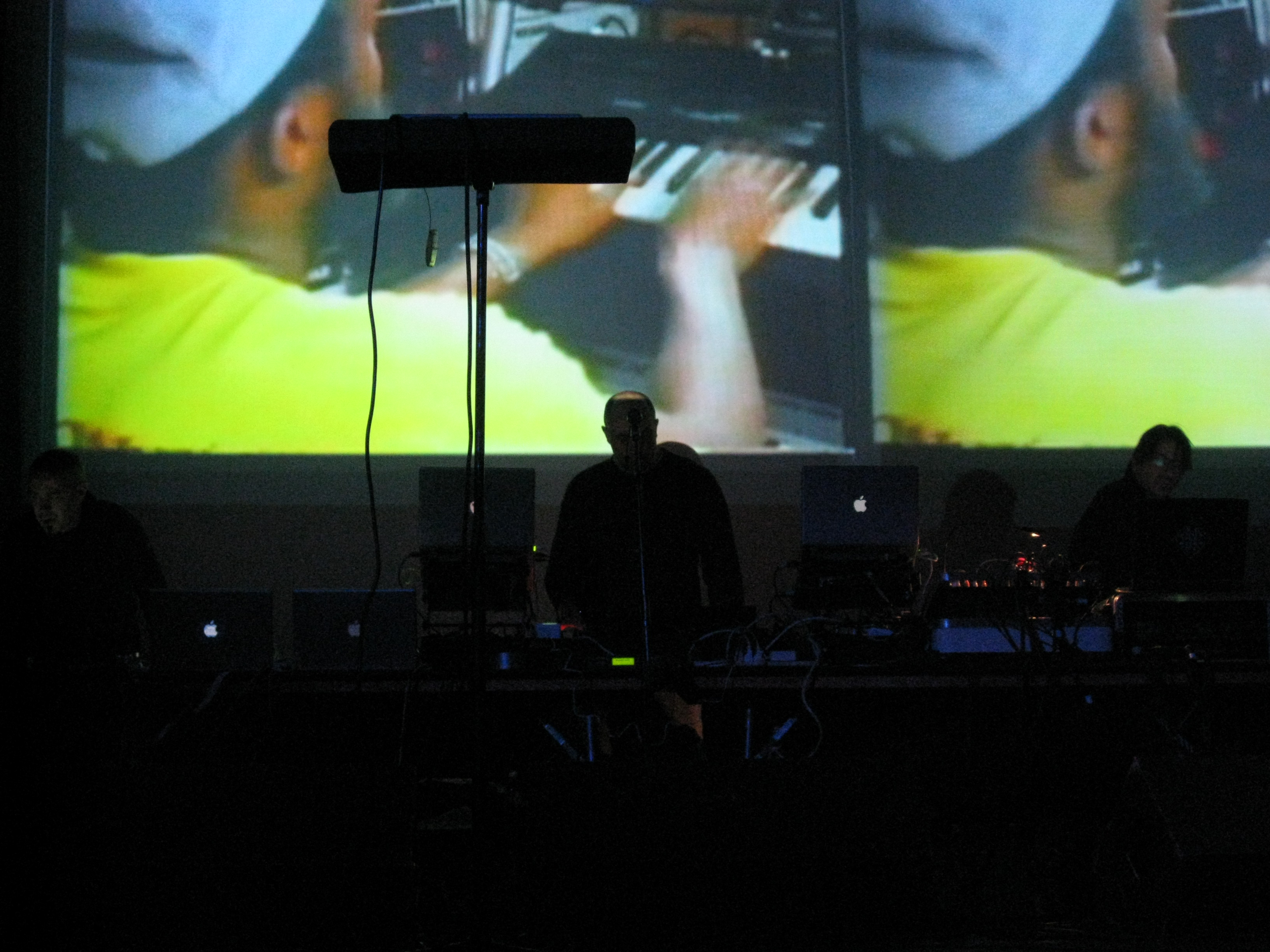
- Meat Beat Manifesto live in 2008

Background information
- Origin: Swindon, Wiltshire, England
- Genres: Breakbeat; electronic; industrial
- Years active: 1987–present
- Labels: Mute, Wax Trax!, Nothing, Brainwashed, Thirsty Ear, Planet Mu, Tino Corp.
- Members: Jack Dangers; Lynn Farmer; Mark Pistel; Benjamin Stokes
- Past members: Marcus Adams; Colin James; Craig Morrison; Mike Powell; Jonny Stephens; Jon Wilson; Simon Collins
- Website: www.meatbeatmanifesto.com

Meat Beat Manifesto, often shortened as Meat Beat, Manifesto or MBM, is an electronic music group originally consisting of Jack Dangers and Jonny Stephens that was formed in 1987 in Swindon, United Kingdom. The band, fronted by Dangers (the only permanent member), has proven versatile over the years, experimenting with techno, breakbeat, industrial, dub and jazz fusion while touring the world and influencing major acts such as Nine Inch Nails, the Chemical Brothers and the Prodigy. Some of the band's earlier work has been credited with influencing the rise of the trip hop, big beat, and drum and bass genres.

== History ==
=== Early years ===
Dangers and Stephens had formed the English pop group Perennial Divide in 1986 with Paul Freeguard and released the first few Meat Beat Manifesto singles as a side project. The first release under the Meat Beat name was 1987's Suck Hard EP on Sweat Box Records. They left Perennial Divide in 1988 to record a full Meat Beat album. The tapes of what would have been the debut MBM album were claimed to have been destroyed in a studio fire before it could be released (detailed in a publicity statement). The former founder of Sweat Box Records (Rob Deacon) said that the fire never happened. Jack Dangers confirmed the story of the fire in a 2010 interview. The pair then recorded the LP Storm The Studio, which got them pigeonholed as an industrial act because Sweat Box Records sold the rights to the LP to Wax Trax Records for release in the United States. In response, they released 99% in May 1990, which was more techno-influenced and characterized by heavy beats and ubiquitous samples. In August they released Armed Audio Warfare, which was an effort to re-create the lost tracks of the would-be début album.

The band's live show was conceived as an intense audio-visual experience, with dancers, led by choreographer Marcus Adams, in costumes and sets designed by artist Craig Morrison and video clips accompanying live instruments, sequenced electronic instruments, and live DJing. In the United States, they opened for Nine Inch Nails on their debut national tour in 1990. In 1991, they performed at The Limelight in Manhattan and toured North America with Consolidated. Despite his contributions being nonmusical in nature, Adams was credited as a full band member and appeared in many of the band's record sleeves and promo photos until the release of Satyricon in 1992. Adams also appeared in several of MBM's early videos, such as "Strapdown" and "Psyche-Out".

1992's Satyricon continued to show Meat Beat adopting a more mainstream electronic sound, crediting influences of such newly popular dance bands as Orbital, The Shamen, and The Orb, all of whom had either remixed or been remixed by MBM. The album produced the hits "Mindstream" and "Circles". "Original Control (Version 2)", renamed "I Am Electro" in later compilations, is the best-known track from the album, featuring samples of recordings from the 1939 World's Fair exhibit Elektro The Robot, and was the opening song in MBM's 2005–2006 tour.

=== Nothing Records years, 1994–1998 ===
In 1993, Dangers relocated from England to San Francisco, resulting in Stephens' departure from the band. At this time, Nothing Records was founded as an imprint of Interscope with the purpose of signing industrial and electronic bands to capitalize on the recent success of Nine Inch Nails. Nothing, helmed by Trent Reznor, signed Meat Beat Manifesto and in 1996 the double album Subliminal Sandwich was released. While this album represented MBM's major-label debut, it failed to achieve the critical and commercial successes of previous releases. The album is notable for the last appearance of Jonny Stephens who contributed guitar on the track "Asbestos Lead Asbestos." After Subliminal Sandwich, Dangers put together an album called Original Fire that collected various studio rarities, B-sides, and fan favorites from the early years of MBM, in addition to some new remixes of the material. Also in 1996, the group contributed to the AIDS benefit album Offbeat: A Red Hot Soundtrip produced by the Red Hot Organization.

In 1997, Dangers recruited drummer Lynn Farmer and multi-instrumentalist John Wilson (MBM member 1995–1998, former Supreme Love Gods) to record and release Actual Sounds + Voices in 1998, which found the group's earlier flirtations with jazz fusion featured more prominently; the record included appearances by saxophonist Bennie Maupin. The album yielded the single "Prime Audio Soup" which was featured in the film The Matrix and its soundtrack. While Jon Wilson left the band prior to the 1998–1999 tour, Farmer remains with the band as of Spring 2007. Wilson was replaced by former Consolidated programmer Mark Pistel, who also remains a contributing member.

During these years, Dangers contributed a pair of remixes to high-profile Nine Inch Nails releases Closer to God and The Perfect Drug. After the release of Actual Sounds + Voices, Meat Beat Manifesto was let go by Nothing Records and once more appeared on independent labels.

Meat Beat Manifesto headlined the Organic '96 Music Festival in the USA on June 22, 1996 at the Snow Valley Ski Resort in Running Springs, California. This festival also featured Underworld, Orbital, The Chemical Brothers, and The Orb.

=== RUOK?, 2000–2004 ===
In 2000, Dangers released a 12" MBM EP of four new songs called Eccentric Objects which demonstrated a shift in Dangers' output towards simpler song structure and less sonically dense layering. This evolution in form was full realized two years later, in 2002, with the release of Meat Beat Manifesto's seventh full-length album, RUOK?. This album prominently featured Dangers' newly acquired EMS Synthi 100, as well as guest contributions from turntablist Z-Trip and The Orb's Alex Paterson. In 2003 MBM released a remix album for Storm The Studio, followed by ...In Dub, a remix album of RUOK?.

=== At the Center, 2005–2007 ===
At the Center was released on 29 May 2005. A part of independent label Thirsty Ear's 'Blue Series' fusing jazz with electronic genres, the album is a collaboration between Jack Dangers and jazz musicians Peter Gordon (flute), Dave King (drums), and Craig Taborn (keyboards). While Dangers had, in the past, flirted with jazz instrumentation and sampling on a handful of Meat Beat Manifesto tracks, At the Center was a marked variation of the expected MBM sound and was more of a one-off experiment than a whole new direction for the band. The album has been well received by many critics, with one reviewer calling it "one of the best albums of the year in any genre." An EP of outtakes, live tracks and a remix titled Off-Centre was released shortly after.

From 2005 through 2006, MBM launched a worldwide tour, their first since 1999, making use of video sampling technology that allowed the band to trigger video clips in real-time, on two large screens positioned stage front, while the band performed either side-stage or behind the screens, out of the audience's view; instead, live video footage of the band performing was displayed onscreen alongside the pre-assembled clips. Many of the video clips used were the sources of samples previously used in various MBM tracks, such as footage of Elektro the Robot and clips from films such as Head and Dark Star. Dangers and crew performed a wide variety of hits and fan favorites from the entire back catalog, though relatively little of the new jazz fusion material from At the Center was played.

In 2006, Meat Beat Manifesto's "Suicide" was released on the Underworld: Evolution soundtrack and is the only MBM track to date to prominently feature a guitar.

In May 2007 Dangers released a double CD titled Archive Things 1982-88 / Purged. The first disc contained many early Meat Beat Manifesto experimentations, including demos of what would later become seminal MBM tracks such as "I Got the Fear". The second disc was an instrumental version of the Perennial Divide album, Purge.

=== Autoimmune and Answers Come in Dreams, 2008–2010 ===
MBM's ninth studio album, Autoimmune, was released on 7 April 2008 in Europe via Planet Mu Records and on 8 April 2008 in the US and Canada via Metropolis Records., with each territory's issue featuring a different track listing. The album featured the first vocals by Dangers himself since 1998's Actual Sounds + Voices, as well as collaborations with DJ Z-Trip, MC Azeem, and Kenneth James Gibson. The album has been described as a return to an older, harder MBM sound and as a dubstep album, though Dangers has stated that he prefers not to fall into any specific genre or category with his work. The lead single, "Guns And Lovers" was released as a digital single via iTunes on 18 March 2008, while the track "Lonely Soldier" was released as a single via bleep.com. Meat Beat Manifesto once more toured to support the new album with the same stage setup as the 2005–2006 tour.

Meat Beat Manifesto released Answers Come in Dreams in late 2010, once more via Metropolis Records in the US and via Hydrogen Dukebox in the UK. Answers Come in Dreams continued to reference dubstep as had its predecessor Autoimmune, but overall was a darker, denser album, at times descending into beatless ambient noise passages reminiscent of the experimental second disc of 1996's Subliminal Sandwich.

=== Impossible Star and Opaque Couché, 2011-present ===
After the release of Answers Come in Dreams, Meat Beat Manifesto entered a period of limited activity lasting several years. Between 2011 and 2016, a small handful of EPs were released, and MBM only performed live sporadically. They appeared at the Cold Waves V festival in Chicago in 2016, the first live Meat Beat Manifesto show in five years. The following September they performed at Cold Waves LA.

In January 2018, Meat Beat Manifesto released their eleventh studio album Impossible Star on the label Flexidisc. First single "We Are Surrounded" was premiered online by Igloo Magazine on 24 October 2017. The album has been called a "proverbial return to form" after the dalliances with dubstep on Autoimmune and Answers Come in Dreams. MBM also contributed an original track to the Cold Waves VII benefit compilation later that year, and a limited U.S. tour took place in the fall.

Opaque Couché, Meat Beat Manifesto's twelfth album, was released on 10 May 2019 via Flexidisc. The track "Pin Drop" was released as a video single on YouTube on 6 March, with "No Design" following on 1 April. Considered a companion album to Impossible Star, Opaque Couché was named after "the world's ugliest color".

MBM debuted a brand new song and video and contributed a pre-recorded performance set to the Cold Waves 2020 "Lost Weekend"; the entire festival was streamed on Twitch due to the ongoing coronavirus pandemic in the United States. The new song also appeared on the corresponding Cold Waves 2020 compilation.

== Discography ==
Meat Beat Manifesto have released a number of albums and singles, and participated in remixes and compilation albums.

=== Studio albums ===
- Storm the Studio (1989)
- Armed Audio Warfare (1990)
- 99% (1990)
- Satyricon (1992)
- Subliminal Sandwich (1996)
- Actual Sounds + Voices (1998)
- RUOK? (2002)
- At The Center (2005)
- Autoimmune (2008)
- Answers Come in Dreams (2010)
- Impossible Star (2018)
- Opaque Couché (2019)
- Man from Mantis (with Dimensional Holofonic Sound) (2023)
- Extinct (with Merzbow) (2024)

=== Remix albums ===
- Storm The Studio RMXS (2003)
- ...In Dub (2004)
- Future Transmissions: Meat Beat Manifesto (2024)

=== Compilation albums ===
- Original Fire (1997)
- Archive Things 1982-88 (2007)
