= Jack Dangers =

English musician, DJ, producer, and remixer

- Also known as: Space Children, Loop Finder General
- Born: John Stephen Corrigan; 11 January 1965 (age 61)
- Origin: Swindon, Wiltshire, England
- Genres: Electronic; trip hop; dub; big beat; dubstep; alternative dance; industrial
- Instruments: Vocals; synthesisers
- Years active: 1980s–present

John Stephen Corrigan (born 11 January 1965), known professionally as Jack Dangers, is an English electronic musician, DJ, producer, and remixer best known for his work as the primary member of Meat Beat Manifesto. He lives in San Francisco.

== Career ==
Prior to founding Meat Beat Manifesto together in 1987, Jack Dangers and Jonny Stephens were members of a short-lived group Perennial Divide. While Stephens remained a member for several years, Jack Dangers is the only person credited as a member of the band on every Meat Beat Manifesto release.

In addition to his career with Meat Beat Manifesto, Jack Dangers has also contributed to other projects. Along with Ben Stokes (DHS-(Dimensional Holofonic Sound)) and Mike Powell, he is a part of the breakbeat combo known simply as Tino. Tino's material is released through their independent label, Tino Corp. Another collaboration called Loop Finder General was announced at one time, but the only recording that has surfaced under this name is a track on ¡Hello Friends!, a Jack Dangers DJ mix album primarily featuring Tino material.

In 1999, Dangers worked with guitarist and producer Danny Saber of Black Grape to form a project named Spontaneous Human Combustion. The project was unusual in that it was among the earliest to make and release music entirely online for free without the involvement of a music label.

As a remixer and producer, Dangers has collaborated with and reworked material for David Bowie, Nine Inch Nails, David Byrne, DJ Spooky, Merzbow, Depeche Mode, Coil, dubLoner, and many others. In 2021, he contributed drum programming to "Girl Is A Gun" by Halsey.

Dangers is a collector of obscure audio and video material, and frequently employs samples from his collection of records and videotapes in his music and during live shows. Dangers also collects vintage electronic hardware; he owns an EMS Synthi 100 modular system.

An activist for animal rights and a practising vegetarian, Dangers has contributed (as part of Meat Beat Manifesto) to two benefit compilations for In Defense of Animals. He credits his active concern for these issues to fellow musicians Consolidated, for whom he has produced several albums and done a number of remixes.

His remix of Tower of Power's "What Is Hip?" was nominated for a Grammy in 2006.

In 2023, Dangers remixed Kenneth James Gibson's track "David's Pass" for the remix album Further Translations on Gibson's Meadows Heavy Recorders label.

== Discography ==
Solo, as Jack Dangers:

Sounds of the 20th Century No1 (2000)
No.	Title	Length
1.	"Peristaltic Wave"	3:51
2.	"My Shorty"	6:42
Total length:		10:33

Sounds of the 20th Century No2 (2001)
No.	Title	Length
1.	"8 Miniatures With Origins"	6:17
2.	"The Human Voice"	5:24
Total length:		11:41

Tape Music (2001)
No.	Title	Length
1.	"XE"	4:01
2.	"AL"	5:56
3.	"H2O"	6:33
4.	"ALH 8400 [Drift]"	3:07
Total length:		19:37

- Variaciones Espectrales (2002)
- Forbidden Planet Explored (2004)
- Loudness Clarifies / Electronic Music from Tapelab (2004)
- Music for Planetarium (2008)

Other aliases and collaborations:

See also Perennial Divide and Meat Beat Manifesto discography

- Let's Go Disco (as Space Children) (1988)
- ¡Hello Friends! (DJ CD) (2001)
- Pro.File 1 Meat Beat Manifesto/Jack Dangers Remix Collection (with Meat Beat Manifesto) (2002)
- Hiss & Buzz (with dubLoner) (2005)
- Tracks (with Bomb The Bass) (2001)
- Education (The JDs) (with Jon Drukman of Bass Kittens) (2010)

Other credits

- Remixed "The Snow" on Coil's EP The Snow (1991).
- Remixed "You've Been Around" on David Bowie's single "Black Tie White Noise" (1993).
- Remixed "One" on Bigod 20's single "One" (1994).
- Remixed "Back in the Box" on David Byrne's single "Back in the Box" (1994).
- Remixed "Insect Kin" on Bush's remix album Deconstructed (1997).
- Remixed "Amlux" on Merzbow's album Merzbeat (2002).
- Remixed "Kill People" on Excepter's FRKWAYS Vol. 2 remix 12 (2009).
- Remixed "Soulsonic" on Tox Simian's Soulsonic EP. (2011)

=== Compilation appearances ===
- "A Strange Case of Instrumentation" and "The Self Enjoy" on Brainwaves (2006 November)

== Quotes ==
"I don't believe in slamming people in the face with my beliefs; I really go for more subtle references to politics. If people have an inch of compassion or a few brain cells, they should be able to figure it out."—from an interview for PETA
