= Jamie Cullum discography =

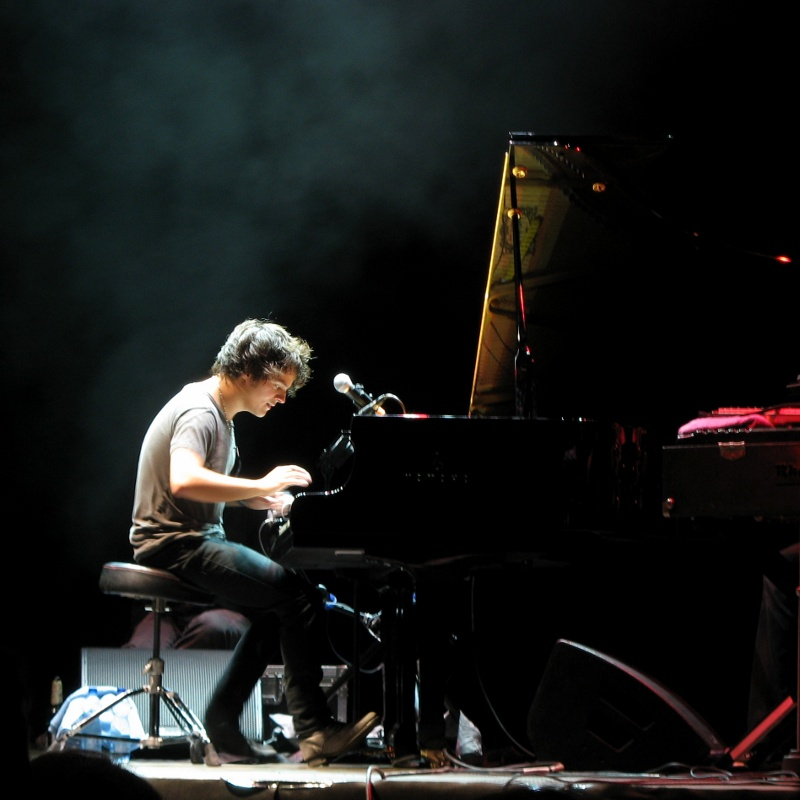
- Cullum performing at Colours of Ostrava, July 2009
- Studio albums: 9
- Live albums: 1
- Compilation albums: 4
- Singles: 32
- Music videos: 15
- Other appearances: 24

The discography of Jamie Cullum, a British pop and jazz-pop singer-songwriter and multi-instrumentalist, consists of nine studio albums, four compilation albums, one live album, 32 singles, and 15 music videos.

== Albums ==
=== Studio albums ===
Title	Details	Peak chart positions											Certifications (sales thresholds)
Title	Details	UK	AUS	AUT	DEN	ESP	FRA	GER	IRL	NLD	SWE	US	Certifications (sales thresholds)
Heard It All Before by Jamie Cullum Trio	Released: 3 August 1999; Label: Self-released; Format: CD	—	—	—	—	—	—	—	—	—	—	—	
Pointless Nostalgic	Released: 23 September 2002; Label: Candid; Format: CD, LP	55	—	—	—	—	177	—	—	—	—	—	BPI: Gold
Twentysomething	Released: 20 October 2003; Label: UCJ, Candid; Formats: CD, LP, digital download	3	2	30	37	55	57	57	19	3	17	83	BPI: 4× Platinum; ARIA: Platinum; BVMI: Gold
Catching Tales	Released: 26 September 2005; Label: UCJ, Candid; Formats: CD, LP, digital download	4	26	22	11	16	39	30	42	3	21	49	BPI: Gold; BVMI: Gold
The Pursuit	Released: 10 November 2009; Label: Decca; Formats: CD, LP, digital download	16	60	24	40	15	18	11	97	11	46	42	BPI: Gold; BVMI: Gold
Momentum	Released: 20 May 2013; Label: Island; Format: CD, LP, digital download	20	34	12	25	9	67	10	58	27	—	156	
Interlude	Released: 6 October 2014; Label: Island; Format: CD, LP, digital download	19	—	23	—	22	31	13	—	42	—	154	
Taller	Released: 7 June 2019; Label: Island; Format: CD, LP, digital download, streaming	17	—	17	—	17	141	16	—	55	—	—	
The Pianoman at Christmas	Released: 20 November 2020; Label: Island; Format: CD, LP, digital download, streaming	11	—	27	—	—	—	16	82	—	—	—	BPI: Silver
"—" denotes a recording that did not chart or was not released in that territory.

=== Live album ===
Title	Details
Live at Ronnie Scott's	Released: 27 June 2006; Label: Verve Forecast; Format: CD, digital download

=== Compilation albums ===
Title	Details
In the Mind of Jamie Cullum	Released: 28 August 2007; Label: District 6; Format: CD
Jamie Cullum: Influences	Released: 2007; Label: Sony BMG; Format: CD (US only, limited edition)
Kings of Swing (Frank Sinatra and Jamie Cullum)	Released: 2007; Label: Smith & Co. Sound and Vision; Format: CD
Devil May Care!	Released: 2010; Label: Candid; Format: CD
The Song Society Playlist	Released: 25 December 2018; Label: Island Records; Format: Digital download
Song Society Volume 2	Released: 8 November 2019; Label: Island Records; Format: Digital download
For the Love	Released: 14 February 2022; Label: Universal Music Group; Format: Digital download, streaming

== Singles ==
=== As lead artist ===
Title	Year	Peak chart positions									Album
Title	Year	UK	DEN	GER	IRL	ITA	JPN	NLD	SPA	US AAA	Album
"High and Dry"	2002	—	—	—	—	—	—	—	—	—	Pointless Nostalgic
"All At Sea"	2003	—	—	—	—	—	—	79	—	5	Twentysomething
"These Are the Days" / "Frontin'"	2004	12	—	—	36	—	—	—	—	—	Twentysomething
"The Wind Cries Mary"	2004	—	—	—	—	—	—	—	—	—	Twentysomething
"Everlasting Love"	2004	20	13	—	43	—	—	19	—	—	Twentysomething
"Get Your Way"	2005	44	—	—	—	—	—	31	—	19	Catching Tales
"Mind Trick"	2005	32	—	—	—	—	—	63	—	—	Catching Tales
"Photograph"	2006	—	—	—	—	—	—	88	—	—	Catching Tales
"I'm All Over It"	2009	55	—	93	—	—	6	63	—	—	The Pursuit
"Don't Stop the Music"	2010	—	—	58	—	—	—	79	—	—	The Pursuit
"Wheels"	2010	—	—	—	—	—	64	—	—	15	The Pursuit
"Love Ain't Gonna Let You Down"	2010	—	—	—	—	—	—	—	—	—	The Pursuit
"Everything You Didn't Do"	2013	—	—	—	—	—	31	—	7	—	Momentum
"Edge of Something"	2013	197	—	—	—	—	—	—	—	—	Momentum
"You're Not the Only One"	2013	—	—	—	—	—	—	—	—	—	Momentum
"Don't Let Me Be Misunderstood"	2014	—	—	—	—	—	—	—	—	—	Interlude
"Good Morning Heartache"	2014	—	—	—	—	—	—	—	—	—	Interlude
"Don't You Know"	2014	—	—	—	—	—	—	—	—	—	Interlude
"Show Me the Magic"	2016	—	—	—	—	—	—	—	—	—	Non-album single
"Work of Art"	2017	—	—	—	—	—	—	—	—	—	Taller
"The Man"	2018	—	—	—	—	—	—	—	—	—	King of Thieves OST/Taller
"Love Is in the Picture"	2018	—	—	—	—	—	—	—	—	—	Non-album single
"Taller"	2019	—	—	—	—	—	—	—	—	—	Taller
"Drink"	2019	—	—	—	—	—	—	—	—	—	Taller
"The Age of Anxiety"	2019	—	—	—	—	—	—	—	—	—	Taller
"It's Christmas"/"Christmas Don't Let Me Down"	2019	—	—	—	—	—	—	—	—	—	The Pianoman at Christmas
"Don't Give Up on Me"	2020	—	—	—	—	—	—	—	—	—	Non-album single
"Turn on the Lights"	2020	—	—	—	—	—	—	—	—	—	The Pianoman at Christmas
"Hang Your Lights"	2020	—	—	—	—	—	—	—	—	—	The Pianoman at Christmas
"In the Bleak Midwinter"	2020	61	—	—	—	70	—	—	—	—	The Pianoman at Christmas (Complete Edition)
"Christmas Don't Let Me Down" - Single Version	2021	—	—	—	—	—	—	—	—	—	The Pianoman at Christmas (Complete Edition)
"—" denotes a recording that did not chart or was not released in that territory.

=== As featured artist ===
Title	Year	Peak chart positions	Album
" Private Number" (Beverley Knight featuring Jamie Cullum)	2016	—	Soulsville
"Merry Xmas Everybody" (Robbie Williams featuring Jamie Cullum)	2019	—	The Christmas Present
"Stop Crying Your Heart Out" (as BBC Radio 2's Allstars)	2020	7	Non-album singles
"Don't Stop" ("The Feeling"featuring Sophie Ellis-Bextor, Jamie Cullum & Original West End Cast of Everybody's Talking About Jamie)	2021	—	Non-album singles
"—" denotes a recording that did not chart or was not released in that territory.

== Video albums ==
- Live at Blenheim Palace (2004)
- Twentysomething DVD (2004)
- Telling Tales (2005) – with Catching Tales Special Edition
- Live in Buenos Aires (2006)

== Music videos ==
Year	Title	Album
2003	"All at Sea"	Twentysomething
2004	"These Are The Days"	Twentysomething
2004	"Wind Cries Mary"	Twentysomething
2004	"Everlasting Love"	Twentysomething
2004	"High and Dry"	Pointless Nostalgic
2004	"Everlasting Love" (Movie Version)	—N/a
2005	"Get Your Way"	Catching Tales
2005	"Mind Trick"	Catching Tales
2005	"Mind Trick" (Remix)	—N/a
2006	"Photograph"	Catching Tales
2006	"Photograph" (Remix)	—N/a
2008	"Gran Torino" (with Clint Eastwood as Walt Kowalski)	The Pursuit
2008	"I'm All Over It"	The Pursuit
2008	"Don't Stop The Music"	The Pursuit
2010	"Wheels"	The Pursuit
2013	"Love For $ale" (feat. Roots Manuva)	Momentum
2013	"Everything You Didn't Do"	Momentum
2013	"Edge Of Something"	Momentum
2018	"Love Is in the Picture"	—N/a
2019	"Drink"	Taller
2020	"Age of Anxiety"	Taller
2020	"Don't Give Up On Me"	—N/a
2021	"Winter Wonderland" (featuring Kansas Smitty's)	The Pianoman at Christmas (Complete Edition)

== Production and songwriting ==
These are writing and production credits for music outside of Cullum's own solo work.

Title	Year	Artist	Album	Notes
"Gran Torino" (Film version)	2008	Jamie Cullum (featuring Clint Eastwood)	Gran Torino OST	Co-writer
"The Reason I Live"	2013	Rizzle Kicks	Roaring 20s	Co-writer
"I Love You More Than You Think"	2013	Rizzle Kicks	Roaring 20s	Co-writer

== Other appearances ==
Title	Year	Credited artist(s)	Album
"The Road Less Travelled" (featuring Jamie Cullum)	2003	Clare Teal	The Road Less Travelled
"Sweet Insomnia" (featuring Jamie Cullum)	2004	Gwyneth Herbert and Will Rutter	First Songs
"The Greatest Mistake (featuring John Oates and Jamie Cullum)	2004	Handsome Boy Modeling School	White People
"Love Can Wait" (featuring Jamie Cullum)	2005	Geoff Gascoyne	Keep It to Yourself
"God Only Knows" (featuring Jamie Cullum)	2005	Geoff Gascoyne	Keep It to Yourself
"You Can Do It Too (featuring Jamie Cullum)	2006	Pharrell Williams	In My Mind
"One More for My Baby (And One More for the Road)" (featuring Jamie Cullum)	2006	Toots Thielemans	One More for the Road
Grace is Gone	2007	Jamie Cullum	Grace is Gone OST
"Where Is Your Heart At?"	2007	Jamie Cullum	Meet the Robinsons OST
"Give Me the Simple Life"	2007	Jamie Cullum	Meet the Robinsons OST
"To..." (featuring Anthony Kerr and Jamie Cullum)	2007	Geoff Gascoyne	Songs of the Summer
"Bittersweet" (featuring Jamie Cullum)	2007	Relax	Pirates Among People
"Intermission Music" (featuring Jamie Cullum)	2008	Beady Belle	Belvedere
"Gran Torino" (Film version) (featuring Clint Eastwood)	2008	Jamie Cullum	Gran Torino OST
"Stolen Moments" (featuring Jamie Cullum)	2009	Soil & "Pimp" Sessions	6
"Blame It On My Youth" (featuring Jamie Cullum)	2009	Count Basie Orchestra	Swinging, Singing, Playing
"I Won't Grow Up" / "Laura and Emily" / "Time After Time" (with Jamie Cullum)	2010	Geoff Gascoyne	From the Vaults (Note: From the Vaults is the name of a three-song single.)
"Boy" (featuring Jamie Cullum)	2011	Stereo MC's	Emperor's Nightingale
"Remember When" (featuring Jamie Cullum)	2011	Sander Kleinenberg	5K
"Play It Once More" (featuring Elisabeth Nygaard and Jamie Cullum)	2011	Fringe Magnetic	Twistic
"The Reason I Live" (featuring Jamie Cullum)	2013	Rizzle Kicks	Roaring 20s
"Do You Remember" (featuring Jamie Cullum)	2013	Deltron 3030	Event 2
"Every Night"	2014	Jamie Cullum	The Art of McCartney
