= List of UK Jazz & Blues Albums Chart number ones of 2005 =

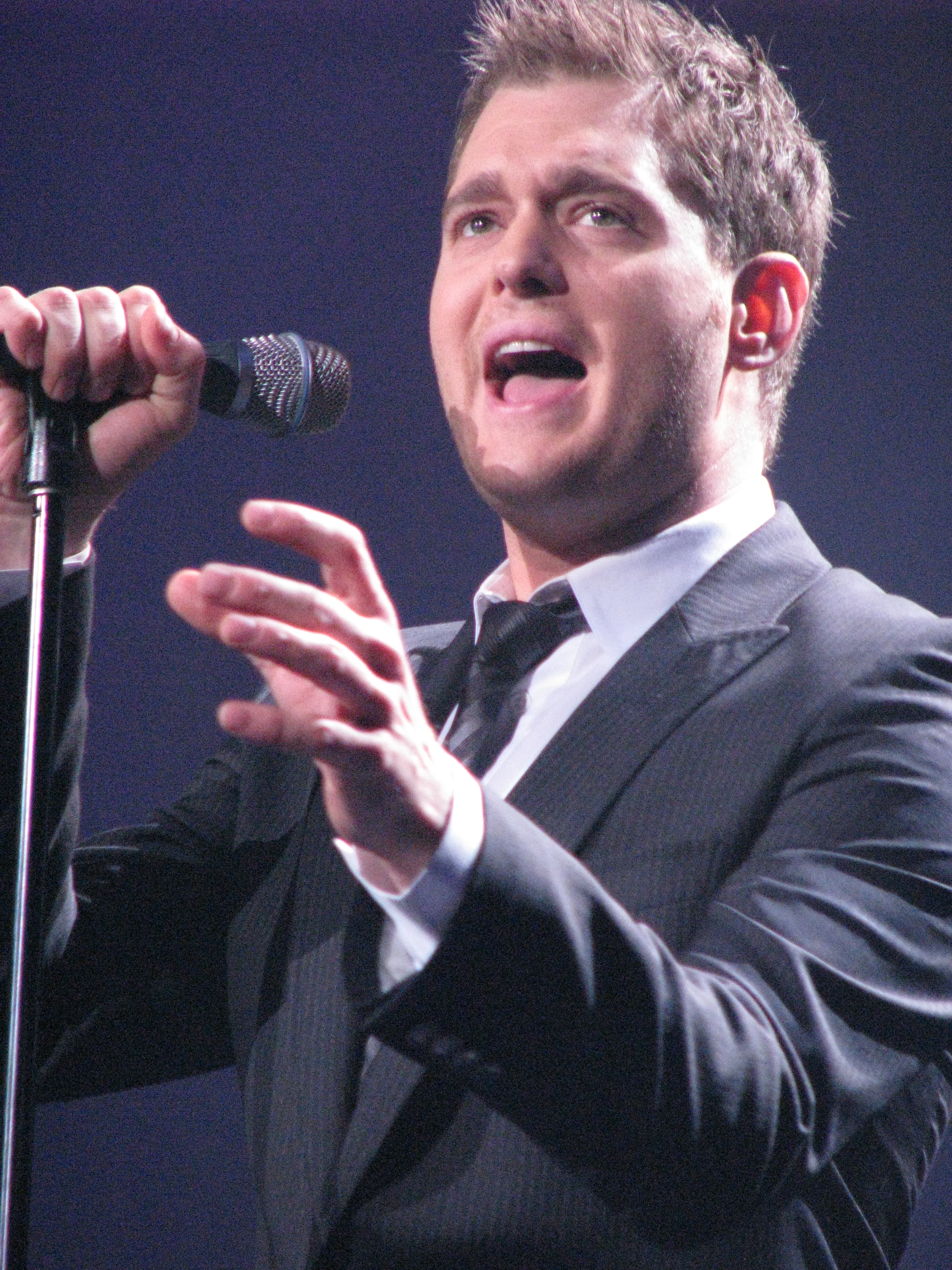
Michael Bublé's fourth studio album It's Time spent half of 2005 at number one on the UK Jazz & Blues Albums Chart, including a single run of 15 weeks.

The UK Jazz & Blues Albums Chart is a record chart which ranks the best-selling jazz and blues albums in the United Kingdom. Compiled and published by the Official Charts Company, the data is based on each album's weekly physical sales, digital downloads and streams. In 2005, 52 charts were published with nine albums at number one. Jamie Cullum's third studio album Twentysomething was the first number-one album of the year, spending the first three weeks atop the chart. Michael Bublé's fourth studio album It's Time was the final number-one album of the year, topping the chart for eight weeks starting in November (it remained number one for the first five weeks of 2006).

The most successful album on the UK Jazz & Blues Albums Chart in 2005 was It's Time, which spent a total of 26 weeks at number one over three spells of 15 weeks, three weeks and eight weeks. Madeleine Peyroux's third studio album Careless Love spent a total of nine consecutive weeks at number one, from 31 July to 8 October 2005. Jamie Cullum also spent nine weeks atop the chart during 2005 – five with Twentysomething and four with follow-up Catching Tales. Rory Gallagher's Big Guns: The Very Best of Rory Gallagher was also number one for four weeks. It's Time finished 2005 as the 42nd best-selling album of the year in the UK.

== Chart history ==
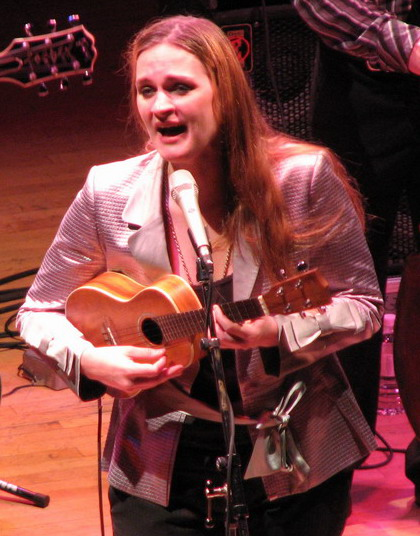
Madeline Peyroux was number one for nine consecutive weeks between July and October 2005 with Careless Love.

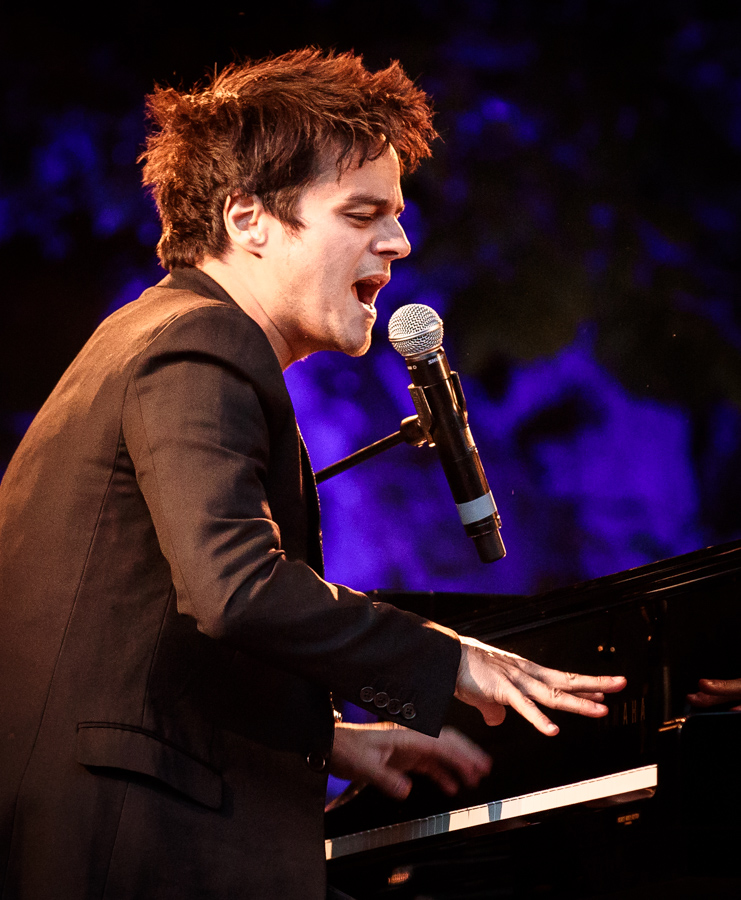
Jamie Cullum also spent nine weeks atop the UK Jazz & Blues Albums Chart in 2005 with Twentysomething (five weeks) and Catching Tales (four weeks).

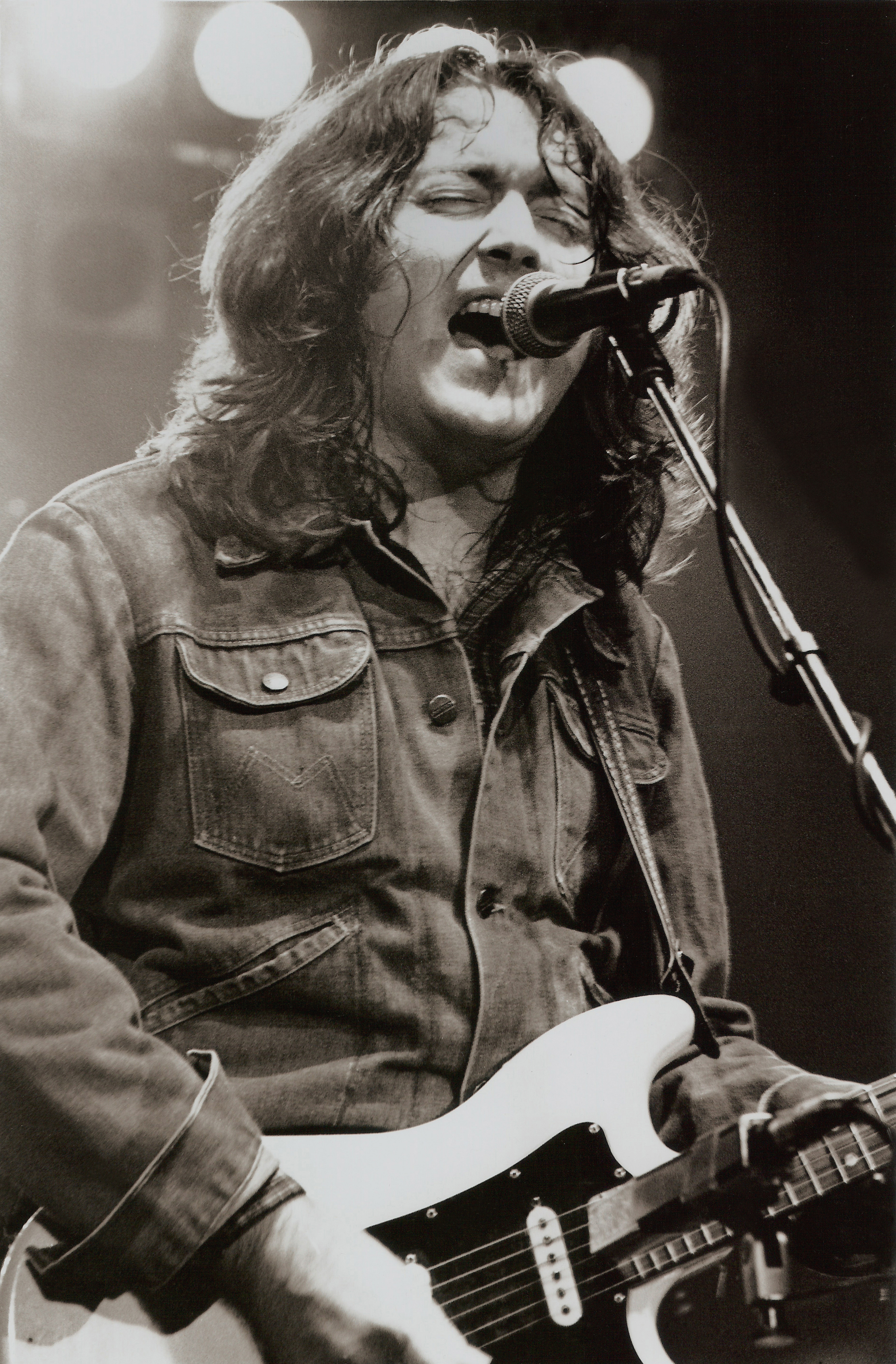
Following his death in June, Rory Gallagher reached number one with the greatest hits album Big Guns: The Very Best of Rory Gallagher.

Key
†	Indicates best-selling jazz/blues album of 2005

Issue date	Album	Artist(s)	Record label(s)	Ref.
2 January	Twentysomething	Jamie Cullum	UCJ	
9 January	Twentysomething	Jamie Cullum	UCJ	
16 January	Twentysomething	Jamie Cullum	UCJ	
23 January	Genius Loves Company	Ray Charles	Liberty	
30 January	Ray: Original Motion Picture Soundtrack	Ray Charles	WSM	
6 February	It's Time †	Michael Bublé	Reprise	
13 February	It's Time †	Michael Bublé	Reprise	
20 February	It's Time †	Michael Bublé	Reprise	
27 February	It's Time †	Michael Bublé	Reprise	
6 March	It's Time †	Michael Bublé	Reprise	
13 March	It's Time †	Michael Bublé	Reprise	
20 March	It's Time †	Michael Bublé	Reprise	
27 March	It's Time †	Michael Bublé	Reprise	
3 April	It's Time †	Michael Bublé	Reprise	
10 April	It's Time †	Michael Bublé	Reprise	
17 April	It's Time †	Michael Bublé	Reprise	
24 April	It's Time †	Michael Bublé	Reprise	
1 May	It's Time †	Michael Bublé	Reprise	
8 May	It's Time †	Michael Bublé	Reprise	
15 May	It's Time †	Michael Bublé	Reprise	
22 May	Capitol Gold: Blues Legends	various artists	EMI/Virgin/UMTV	
29 May	It's Time †	Michael Bublé	Reprise	
5 June	It's Time †	Michael Bublé	Reprise	
12 June	It's Time †	Michael Bublé	Reprise	
19 June	Big Guns: The Very Best of Rory Gallagher	Rory Gallagher	Capo	
26 June	Big Guns: The Very Best of Rory Gallagher	Rory Gallagher	Capo	
3 July	Big Guns: The Very Best of Rory Gallagher	Rory Gallagher	Capo	
10 July	Big Guns: The Very Best of Rory Gallagher	Rory Gallagher	Capo	
17 July	Twenty Something	Jamie Cullum	UCJ	
24 July	Twenty Something	Jamie Cullum	UCJ	
31 July	Careless Love	Madeleine Peyroux	Rounder/UCJ	
7 August	Careless Love	Madeleine Peyroux	Rounder/UCJ	
14 August	Careless Love	Madeleine Peyroux	Rounder/UCJ	
21 August	Careless Love	Madeleine Peyroux	Rounder/UCJ	
28 August	Careless Love	Madeleine Peyroux	Rounder/UCJ	
4 September	Careless Love	Madeleine Peyroux	Rounder/UCJ	
11 September	Careless Love	Madeleine Peyroux	Rounder/UCJ	
18 September	Careless Love	Madeleine Peyroux	Rounder/UCJ	
25 September	Careless Love	Madeleine Peyroux	Rounder/UCJ	
2 October	Catching Tales	Jamie Cullum	UCJ	
9 October	Rock Swings	Paul Anka	Globe	
16 October	Catching Tales	Jamie Cullum	UCJ	
23 October	Catching Tales	Jamie Cullum	UCJ	
30 October	Catching Tales	Jamie Cullum	UCJ	
6 November	It's Time †	Michael Bublé	Reprise	
13 November	It's Time †	Michael Bublé	Reprise	
20 November	It's Time †	Michael Bublé	Reprise	
27 November	It's Time †	Michael Bublé	Reprise	
4 December	It's Time †	Michael Bublé	Reprise	
11 December	It's Time †	Michael Bublé	Reprise	
18 December	It's Time †	Michael Bublé	Reprise	
25 December	It's Time †	Michael Bublé	Reprise	

== See also ==
- 2005 in British music
