= List of UK Jazz & Blues Albums Chart number ones of 2014 =

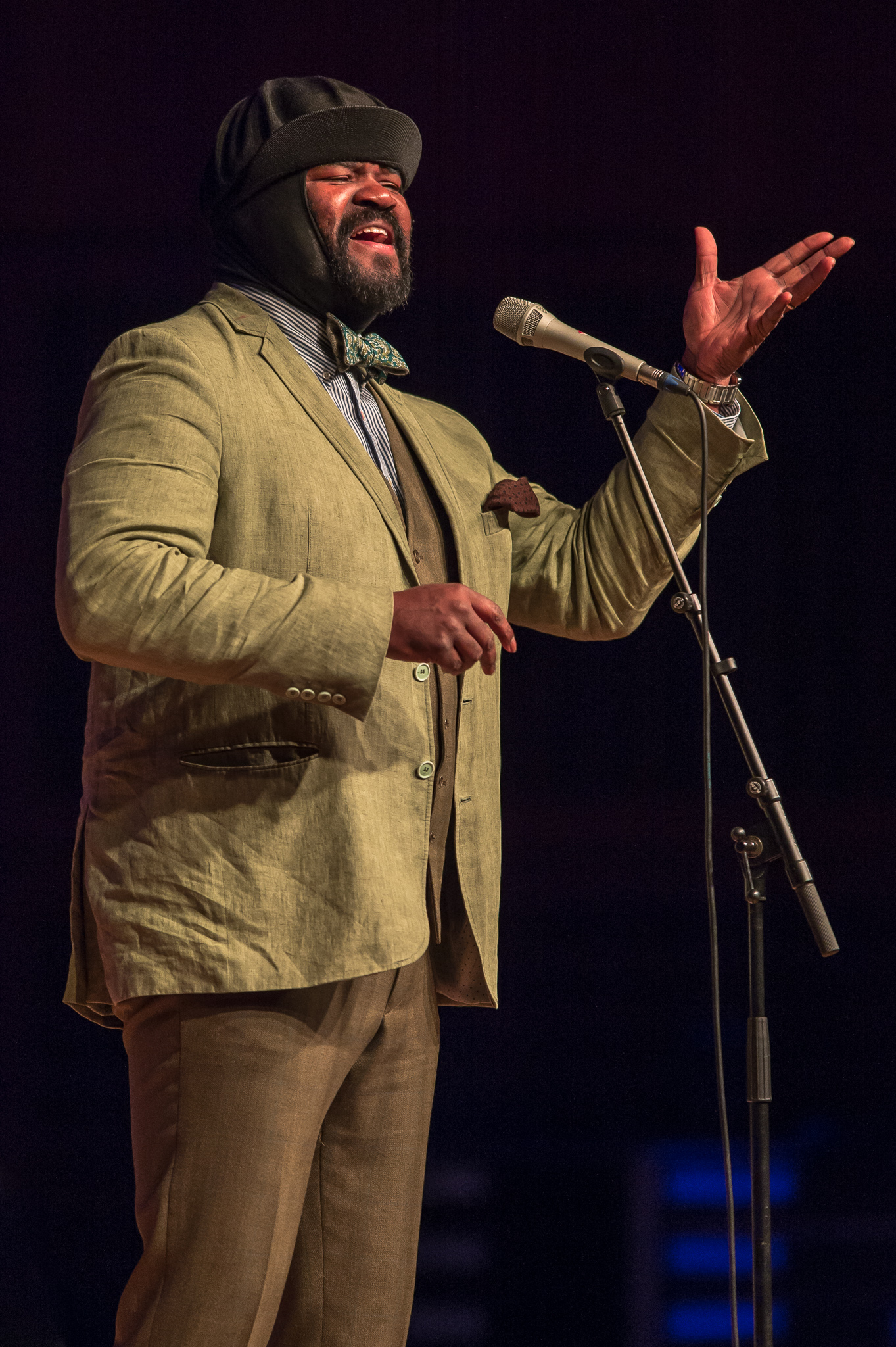
Gregory Porter's third album Liquid Spirit spent a total of 29 weeks atop the UK Jazz & Blues Albums Chart in 2014, including a single run of 19 weeks.

The UK Jazz & Blues Albums Chart is a record chart which ranks the best-selling jazz and blues albums in the United Kingdom. Compiled and published by the Official Charts Company, the data is based on each album's weekly physical sales, digital downloads and streams. In 2014, 52 charts were published with nine albums at number one. The first number-one album of the year was The Shocking Miss Emerald by Caro Emerald, which spent the first three weeks of the year atop the chart at the end of an 11-week run. The last number-one album of the year was Gregory Porter's third album Liquid Spirit, which spent the last three weeks of the year at the top spot.

The most successful album on the UK Jazz & Blues Albums Chart in 2014 was Liquid Spirit, which spent a total of 29 weeks at number one over six separate spells, the longest of which was 19 weeks. Cheek to Cheek, a collaborative album between Tony Bennett and Lady Gaga, spent eight weeks atop the chart, while The Shocking Miss Emerald was number one for a total of seven weeks in 2014. The only two other albums to spend more than a single week at number one were the original soundtrack to the film The Commitments and Interlude, the seventh studio album by Jamie Cullum. Liquid Spirit finished 2014 as the 60th best-selling album of the year in the UK.

== Chart history ==
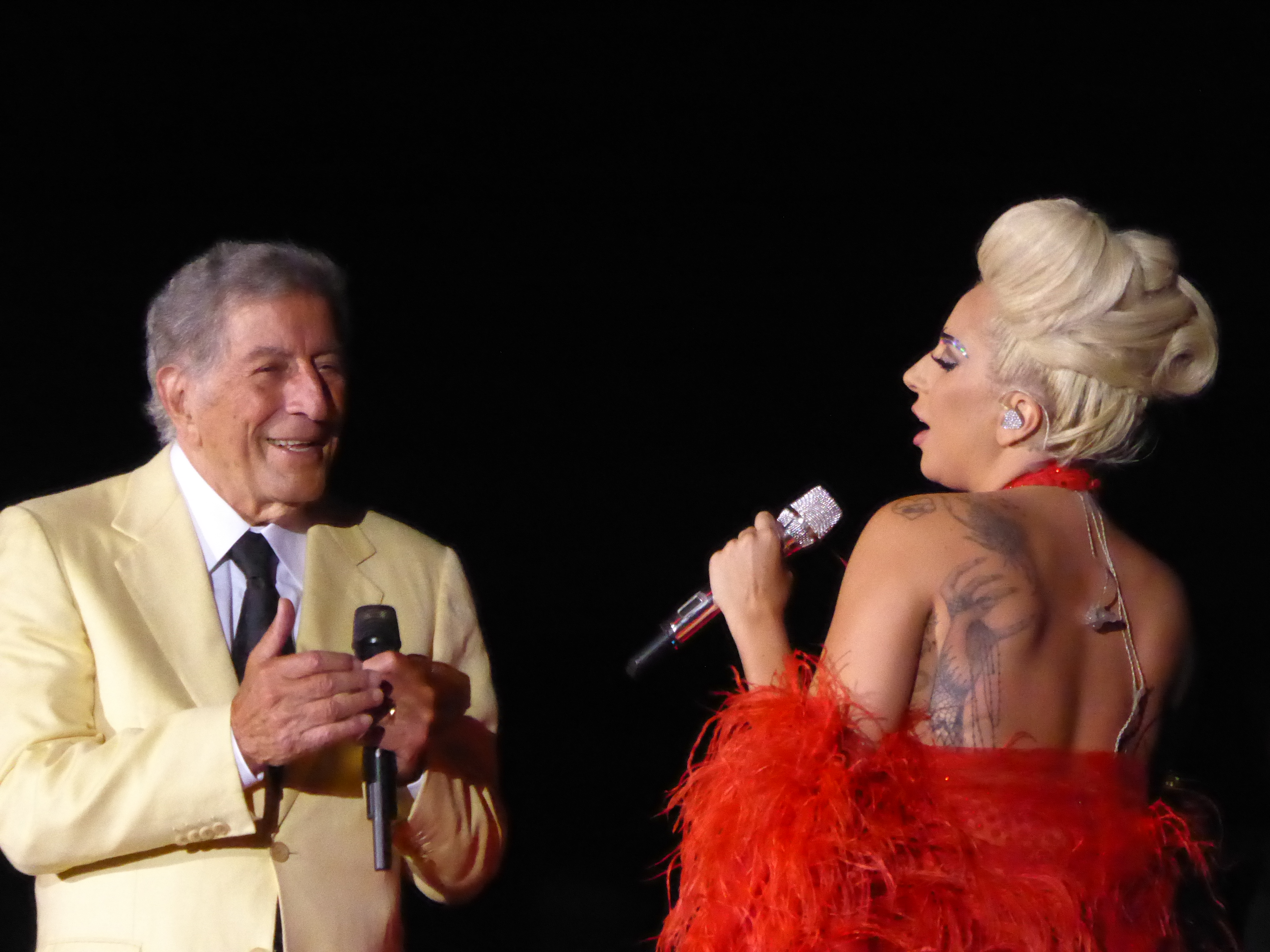
Tony Bennett and Lady Gaga's first collaboration Cheek to Cheek topped the chart for eight weeks in 2014.

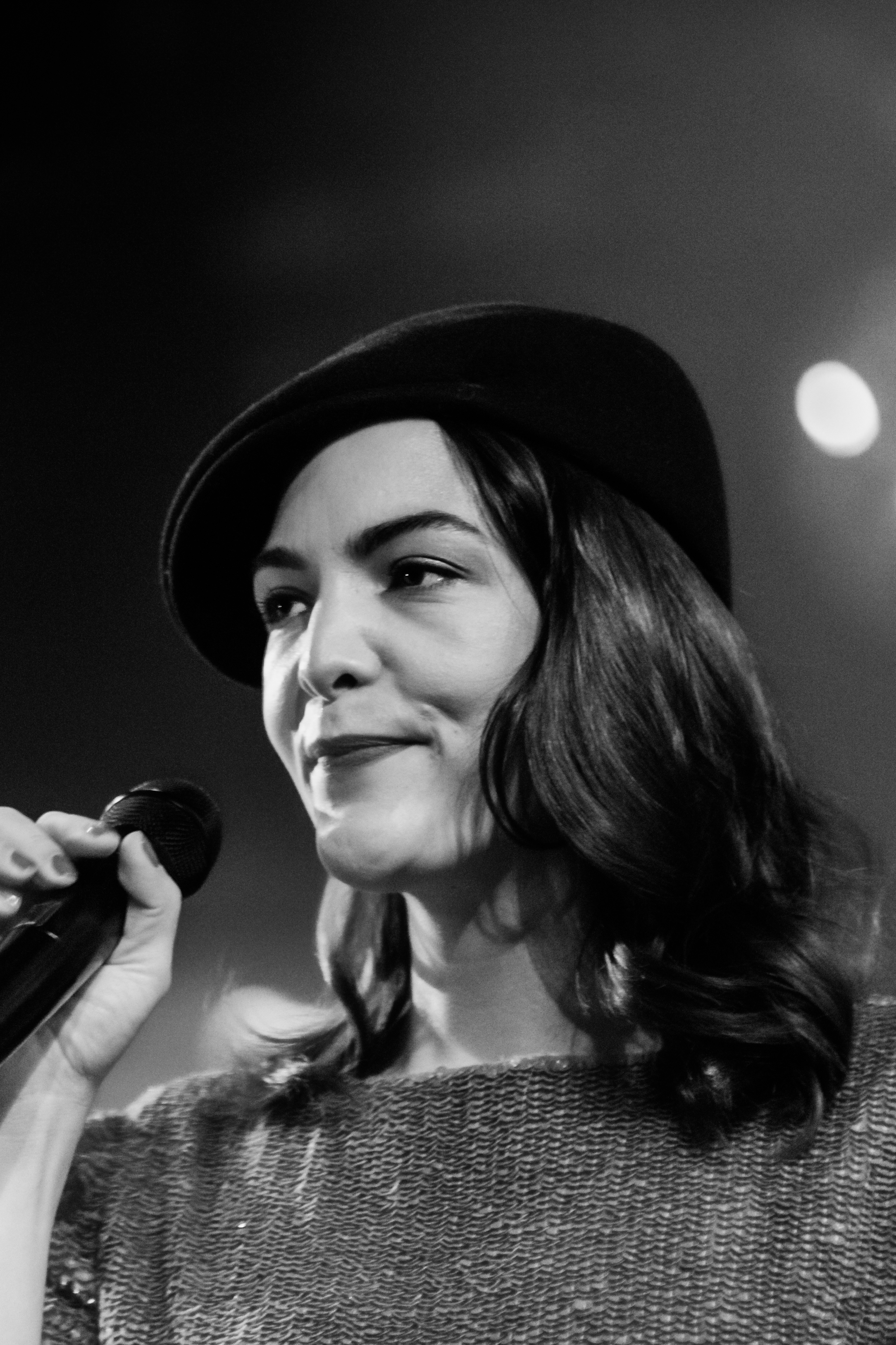
Caro Emerald's second album The Shocking Miss Emerald spent seven weeks at number one in 2014.

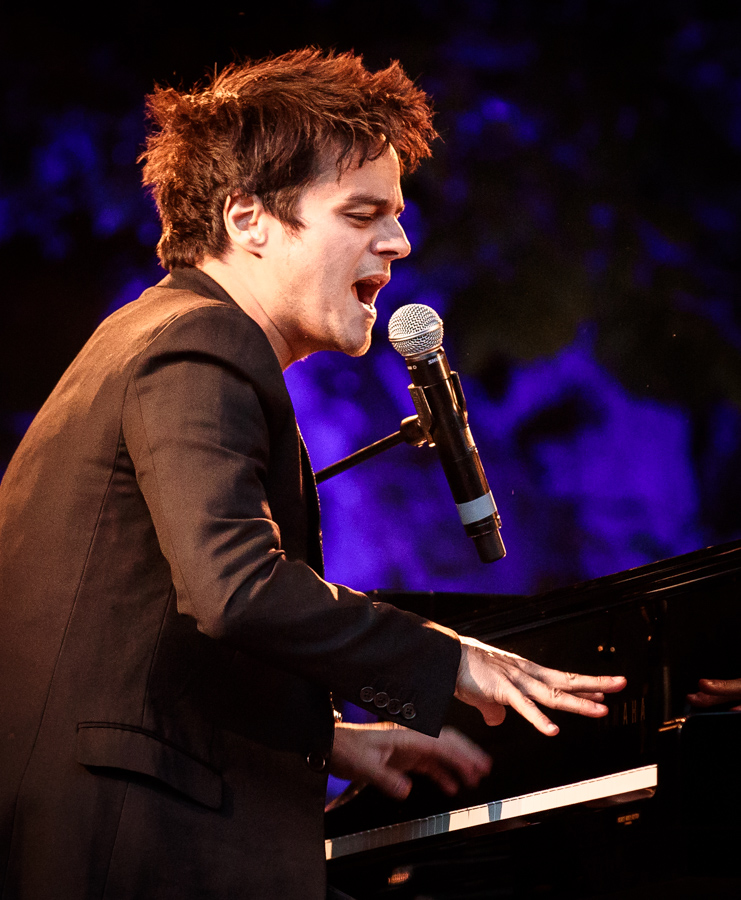
Interlude by Jamie Cullum spent two weeks at number one in October 2014.

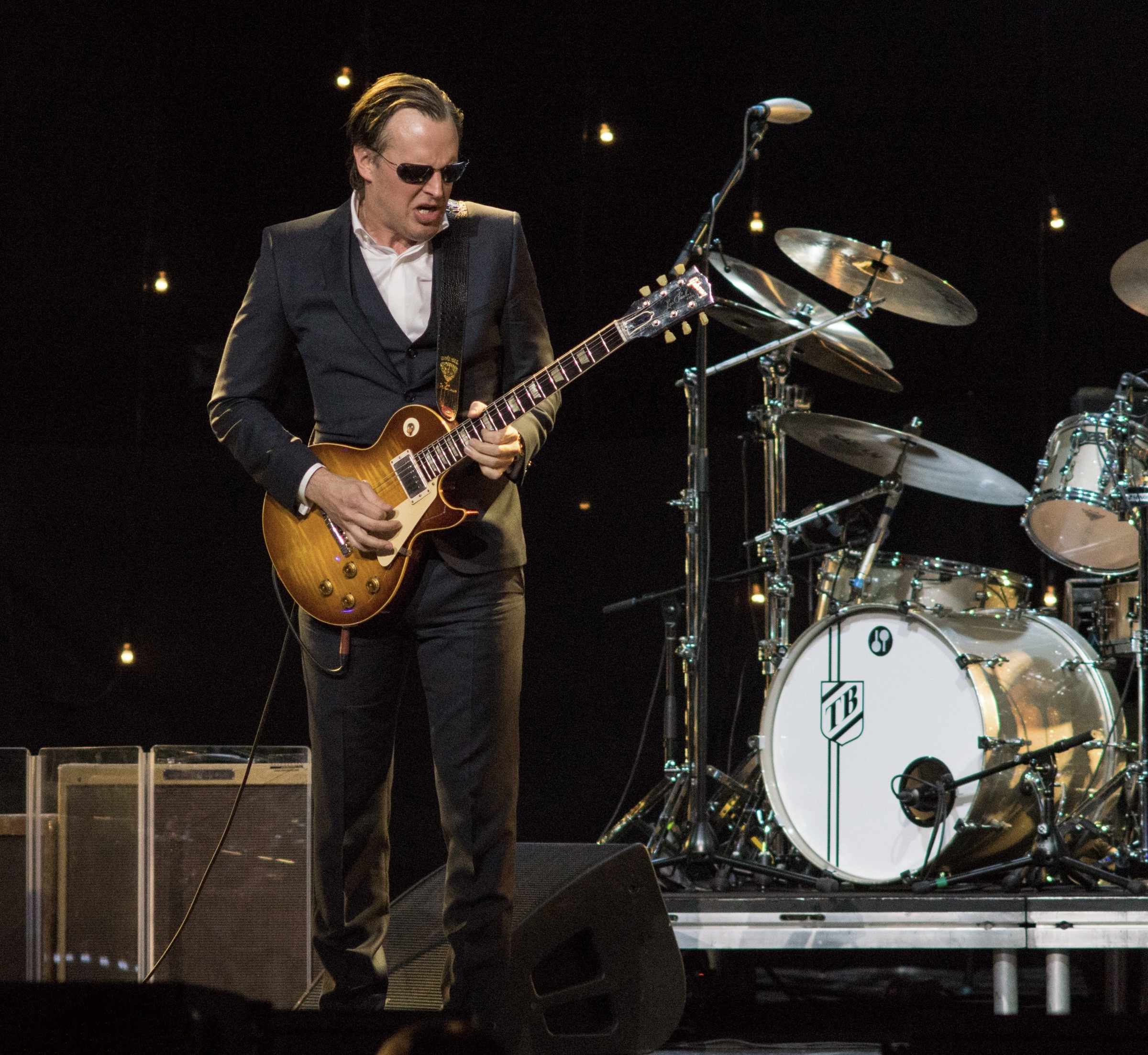
Joe Bonamassa topped the charts with two releases in 2014: Live in Amsterdam and Different Shades of Blue.

Key
†	Indicates best-selling jazz/blues album of 2014

Issue date	Album	Artist(s)	Record label(s)	Ref.
5 January	The Shocking Miss Emerald	Caro Emerald	Dramatico/Grandmono	
12 January	The Shocking Miss Emerald	Caro Emerald	Dramatico/Grandmono	
19 January	The Shocking Miss Emerald	Caro Emerald	Dramatico/Grandmono	
26 January	Liquid Spirit †	Gregory Porter	Blue Note	
2 February	The Royal Sessions	Paul Rodgers	Savoy	
9 February	Liquid Spirit †	Gregory Porter	Blue Note	
16 February	Walkin' Man: The Best of Seasick Steve	Seasick Steve	Rhino	
23 February	The Commitments	original soundtrack	MCA	
2 March	The Commitments	original soundtrack	MCA	
9 March	The Shocking Miss Emerald	Caro Emerald	Dramatico/Grandmono	
16 March	The Shocking Miss Emerald	Caro Emerald	Dramatico/Grandmono	
23 March	Liquid Spirit †	Gregory Porter	Blue Note	
30 March	Live in Amsterdam	Beth Hart, Joe Bonamassa	Provogue	
6 April	Liquid Spirit †	Gregory Porter	Blue Note	
13 April	Liquid Spirit †	Gregory Porter	Blue Note	
20 April	Liquid Spirit †	Gregory Porter	Blue Note	
27 April	Liquid Spirit †	Gregory Porter	Blue Note	
4 May	The Shocking Miss Emerald	Caro Emerald	Dramatico/Grandmono	
11 May	The Shocking Miss Emerald	Caro Emerald	Dramatico/Grandmono	
18 May	Liquid Spirit †	Gregory Porter	Blue Note	
25 May	Liquid Spirit †	Gregory Porter	Blue Note	
1 June	Liquid Spirit †	Gregory Porter	Blue Note	
8 June	Liquid Spirit †	Gregory Porter	Blue Note	
15 June	Liquid Spirit †	Gregory Porter	Blue Note	
22 June	Liquid Spirit †	Gregory Porter	Blue Note	
29 June	Liquid Spirit †	Gregory Porter	Blue Note	
6 July	Liquid Spirit †	Gregory Porter	Blue Note	
13 July	Liquid Spirit †	Gregory Porter	Blue Note	
20 July	Liquid Spirit †	Gregory Porter	Blue Note	
27 July	Liquid Spirit †	Gregory Porter	Blue Note	
3 August	Liquid Spirit †	Gregory Porter	Blue Note	
10 August	Liquid Spirit †	Gregory Porter	Blue Note	
17 August	Liquid Spirit †	Gregory Porter	Blue Note	
24 August	Liquid Spirit †	Gregory Porter	Blue Note	
31 August	Liquid Spirit †	Gregory Porter	Blue Note	
7 September	Liquid Spirit †	Gregory Porter	Blue Note	
14 September	Liquid Spirit †	Gregory Porter	Blue Note	
21 September	Liquid Spirit †	Gregory Porter	Blue Note	
28 September	Different Shades of Blue	Joe Bonamassa	Provogue	
5 October	Cheek to Cheek	Tony Bennett, Lady Gaga	Interscope	
12 October	Interlude	Jamie Cullum	Island	
19 October	Interlude	Jamie Cullum	Island	
26 October	Cheek to Cheek	Tony Bennett, Lady Gaga	Interscope	
2 November	Cheek to Cheek	Tony Bennett, Lady Gaga	Interscope	
9 November	Cheek to Cheek	Tony Bennett, Lady Gaga	Interscope	
16 November	Cheek to Cheek	Tony Bennett, Lady Gaga	Interscope	
23 November	Cheek to Cheek	Tony Bennett, Lady Gaga	Interscope	
30 November	Cheek to Cheek	Tony Bennett, Lady Gaga	Interscope	
7 December	Cheek to Cheek	Tony Bennett, Lady Gaga	Interscope	
14 December	Liquid Spirit †	Gregory Porter	Blue Note	
21 December	Liquid Spirit †	Gregory Porter	Blue Note	
28 December	Liquid Spirit †	Gregory Porter	Blue Note	

== See also ==
- 2014 in British music
