= Black Track =

Studio album by Soil & "Pimp" Sessions
- Released: April 6, 2016
- Genres: Jazz, jazz fusion, death jazz
- Length: 57:56
- Label: Victor

Soil & "Pimp" Sessions chronology
Brothers & Sisters (2014)	Black Track (2016)	Music from and inspired by Hello Harinezumi (2017)

Black Track is the tenth studio album by pioneering jazz group Soil & "Pimp" Sessions, from Japan. It was released on April 6, 2016.

== Track listing ==
No.	Title	Length
1.	"Introduction"	2:03
2.	"By Your Side featuring Bambu & Nia Andrews"	4:39
3.	"BLACK MILK"	6:56
4.	"Connected featuring Nagaoka Ryosuke"	3:45
5.	"Cantaloupe Island"	6:54
6.	"Papaya Pai Pai"	3:38
7.	"88 9th Avenue"	4:03
8.	"In2 My Soul featuring Xavier Boyer from TAHITI 80"	4:21
9.	"One For Carmen"	5:50
10.	"SOILOGIC"	3:08
11.	"Simoom"	4:55
12.	"Mellow Black"	5:02
13.	"SEKAI"	2:37
Total length:		57:56

The album was released with a version (VIZL-94) that included a DVD containing a 60-minute documentary called "Scenes by the BLACK TRACK", directed by Yohei Cogi & Felipe R. Martinez.

== Credits ==
- Performed and arranged by Soil & "Pimp" Sessions
- Toasting [Agitator] – Shacho
- Saxophone – Motoharu
- Trumpet – Tabu Zombie
- Piano – Josei
- Bass – Akita Goldman
- Drums – Midorin
- Guest musicians - Bambu (rap on track 2), Nia Andrews (vocal on track 2), Ryosuke Nagaoka (voice and guitar on track 4), Xavier Boyer from TAHITI 80 (vocal on track 4)
- Mastered by Morisaki Iysine (Saidera Mastering)
- Recorded and mixed by Yasuji Okuda (studio MSR)
- Executive Producer – Minoru Iwabuchi, Naoki Toyoshima (Victor)
- Assistant Engineers – Hiroyuki Kishimoto (Victor Studio)
- A&R, Director – Yuichi Kayada (Victor)
- Piano Tuner - Shin Kano
- Public Relations - Hatayama Yutakasin (Victor)
- Management Staff - Takahashi Junpei (Victor)
- Sales Promotion - Uemura Naofutoshi (Victor)
