= Circles (Soil & "Pimp" Sessions album) =

Studio album by Soil & "Pimp" Sessions
- Released: August 7, 2013
- Genres: Jazz, jazz fusion, death jazz
- Length: 43:15
- Label: Victor

Soil & "Pimp" Sessions chronology
Magnetic Soil (2011)	Circles (2013)	Brothers & Sisters (2014)

Circles is the eighth studio album by pioneering jazz group Soil & "Pimp" Sessions, from Japan. It was released on August 7, 2013.

== Track listing ==
No.	Title	Length
1.	"ジャズィ・カンヴァセイション (Jazzy Conversation) featuring Rhymester"	4:58
2.	"殺し屋危機一髪 (KOROSHIYA KIKI IPPATSU) featuring Ringo Sheena"	2:38
3.	"Summer Love featuring José James"	4:11
4.	"Bon Bon Villa featuring 福原美穂 (Miho Fukuhara)"	4:33
5.	"Light Blue Soldier featuring Miyavi"	4:48
6.	"Iceburn featuring DJ Kentaro"	3:39
7.	"Ananta featuring U-zhaan"	5:24
8.	"記憶の旅 (Kioku no Tavi) featuring Ryat"	5:00
9.	"Frog in the World! featuring 七尾旅人 (Tavito Nanao)"	2:40
10.	"Hey Tagger, I'm Here featuring Bonnie Pink"	5:18
Total length:		43:15

== Additional personnel ==
Tim Conley aka MAST - Guitar on Track 8 "記憶の旅 (Kioku no Tavi)"
