= Pimp Master =

Studio album by Soil & "Pimp" Sessions
- Released: June 23, 2005
- Genre: Jazz, jazz fusion, death jazz
- Length: 51:34
- Label: Victor

Soil & "Pimp" Sessions chronology
Pimpin' (2004)	Pimp Master (2005)	Pimp of the Year (2006)

Pimp Master is the second studio album by pioneering jazz group Soil & "Pimp" Sessions, from Japan. It was released on June 23, 2005.

== Track listing ==
All tracks are written by Soil & "Pimp" Sessions,

No.	Title	Length
1.	"Pimp Master"	1:54
2.	"No Taboo"	3:39
3.	"Filter"	0:06
4.	"Suffocation"	3:43
5.	"Stinger"	4:26
6.	"Waltz for Goddess"	4:27
7.	"Avalanche"	5:41
8.	"A Wheel Within a Wheel"	6:49
9.	"J.D.F#"	2:42
10.	"Low Life"	3:50
11.	"No Matter"	1:06
12.	"Mo' Better Blues"	5:34
13.	"Wasted Time"	5:31
14.	"Master of Pimp"	0:52
15.	"閃く刃 (Hirameku Yaiba)"	1:14
Total length:		51:34

== Credits ==
- Performed and arranged by Soil & "Pimp" Sessions
- Toasting [Agitator] – Shacho
- Saxophone – Motoharu
- Trumpet – Tabu Zombie
- Piano – Josei
- Bass – Akita Goldman
- Drums – Midorin
- Mastered by Yasuji Maeda
- Recorded and mixed by Shinjiro Ikeda
- Executive Producer – Akira Sekiguchi (Victor), Katsunori Ueda (Victor)
- Assistant Engineers – Yoshiyuki Watanabe (Victor Studio), Yasuhiro Shirai (Sound city), Kanako Hayashi (INNIG), Naoya Tokunou (Heart beat), Seiji Toda (Heart Beat)
- A&R, Director – Yuichi Sorita (Victor)
- Artist Promotion – Toyonobu Hatayama (Victor)
- Sales Promotion – Yasuhiro Kanabo (Victor)
- Photography – Keisuke Sanada
- Artwork By [Art Direction] – Schnabel Effects
- Styling – Kenji Koizumi (SCREAMING MIMI'S)
- Layout – Hiroshi Yano (VDC)
- Visual Direction – Tomoro Watanabe (VDC)
