= Pimp of the Year =

Studio album by Soil & "Pimp" Sessions
- Released: March 8, 2006
- Genre: Jazz, jazz fusion, death jazz
- Length: 56:36 (61:07)
- Label: Victor

Soil & "Pimp" Sessions chronology
Pimp Master' (2005)	Pimp of the Year (2006)	Pimpoint (2007)

Pimp of the Year is the third studio album by pioneering jazz group Soil & "Pimp" Sessions, from Japan. It was released on March 8, 2006.

== Track listing ==
- Original Release (56:36)

No.	Title	Length
1.	"Memai"	4:09
2.	"Summer Goddess"	4:43
3.	"Worldwide"	5:01
4.	"Crush!"	3:40
5.	"Sabotage"	4:36
6.	"Scoop Out"	3:58
7.	"Sahara"	7:03
8.	"破片 (Ha Hen)"	6:18
9.	"The Black Widow Blues"	4:08
10.	"The White Widow"	1:34
11.	"i-rony"	4:20
12.	"Last Long"	4:22
13.	"Satsuriku ニューウェイブ"	2:44
Total length:		56:36

- Limited Edition (61:07)

No.	Title	Length
14.	"Need for Speed"	4:31
Total length:		61:07

== Credits ==
- Performed and arranged by Soil & "Pimp" Sessions
- Toasting [Agitator] – Shacho
- Saxophone – Motoharu
- Trumpet – Tabu Zombie
- Piano – Josei
- Bass – Akita Goldman
- Drums – Midorin
- Mastered by Yasuji Maeda
- Assistant Engineer (Mastering) - Yukie Fuse (Bernie Grundman Mastering)
- Recorded and mixed by Koni-Yang from KURID (tracks 1, 4, 6, 11 & 13), Shinjiro Ikeda (tracks 2, 3, 5, 7, 8, 9, 10 & 12)
- Executive Producer – Akira Sekiguchi (Victor), Katsunori Ueda (Victor)
- Assistant Engineers – Hiromitsu Takasu, Yoshiyuki Watanabe (Victor Studio), Naoya Tokunou (Heart beat), Manabu Ito, Koudai Nakase (Innig)
- A&R, Director – Yuichi Sorita (Victor)
- Artist Promotion – Toyonobu Hatayama (Victor)
- Sales Promotion – Yasuhiro Kanabo (Victor)
- Photography – Shoji Uchida
- Artwork by [Art Direction] – Yutaka Kimura (Central 67)
- Hair and make-up - Michio Kutsukake

Objet - Suzuki Studio Visual Coordination - Tomoro Watanabe (VDC)
