= Live at Ronnie Scott's (Jamie Cullum album) =

Live album by Jamie Cullum
- Released: 27 June 2006
- Genre: Pop, jazz-pop
- Length: 57:02
- Label: Verve Forecast

Jamie Cullum chronology
Catching Tales (2005)	Live at Ronnie Scott's (2006)	In the Mind of Jamie Cullum (2007)

Professional ratings
Review scores
Source	Rating
Allmusic	Not rated link

Live at Ronnie Scott's is a live album by British jazz singer Jamie Cullum. It consists of songs from the albums Catching Tales and Twentysomething. It is exclusive to iTunes.

== Track listing ==
1. "Photograph" (Jamie Cullum) – 6:52
2. "Introduction to Nothing I Do" – 1:03
3. "Nothing I Do" (Jamie Cullum) – 5:01
4. "Introduction to 21st Century Kid" – 0:24
5. "21st Century Kid" (Jamie Cullum) – 4:16
6. "What a Difference a Day Makes" (María Grever) – 7:07
7. "Introduction to Get Your Way" – 1:15
8. "Get Your Way" (Allen Toussaint, Jamie Cullum, Dan Nakamura) – 4:00
9. "Introduction to London Skies" – 1:07
10. "London Skies" (Jamie Cullum) – 7:12
11. "Introduction to Mind Trick" – 0:34
12. "Mind Trick" (Jamie Cullum, Ben Cullum) – 4:45
13. "Introduction to Back to the Ground" – 1:15
14. "Back to the Ground" (Jamie Cullum, Ed Harcourt) – 5:37
15. "All at Sea" (Jamie Cullum) – 6:34
