= Heard It All Before =

Heard It All Before may refer to:

- Heard It All Before (album), 1999 album by Jamie Cullum
- "Heard It All Before" (Sunshine Anderson song), 2001
- Heard It All Before (Dinah Jane song)
- Heard It All Before: Live at the Hi Fi Bar, 2007 album by Clutch
