= Save Your Soul =

Save Your Soul may refer to:

- "Save Your Soul", a song by She Wants Revenge from the EP Save Your Soul
- "Save Your Soul", a song by Celine Dion from the album Loved Me Back to Life
- "Save Your Soul", a song by Jamie Cullum from the album Momentum
