= Pimpoint =

- Pimpoint, Japanese Cover.

Studio album by Soil & "Pimp" Sessions
- Released: August 21, 2007
- Genre: Jazz; jazz fusion; death jazz
- Length: 59:46 (66:43)
- Label: Brownswood Records

Soil & "Pimp" Sessions chronology
Pimp of the Year (2006)	Pimpoint (2007)	Planet Pimp (2008)

Alternative Cover
- Pimpoint, UK Cover.

Pimpoint is the fourth studio album by Japanese jazz group Soil & "Pimp" Sessions. It was released on August 21, 2007.

== Track listing ==
All composed by Soil & "Pimp" Sessions, except where noted.

- Japanese Edition (59:43)

No.	Title	Length
1.	"Dawn" ((Midorin))	4:58
2.	"A.I.E." ((Josei))	5:02
3.	"Makuroke" ((Tabu Zombie))	2:40
4.	"Mashiroke" ((Tabu Zombie))	4:29
5.	"WE WANT MORE!!!!!" ((Josei))	3:56
6.	"Zambezi" ((Motoharu/Shacho))	5:42
7.	"Red Clay" ((Freddie Hubbard))	6:11
8.	"Hype of Gold" ((Shacho))	5:56
9.	"Pluto" ((Josei/Shacho))	5:27
10.	"The Party" ((Midorin))	2:51
11.	"Funky Goldman" ((Tabu Zombie))	3:57
12.	"The Slaughter Suite" ((Tabu Zombie))	3:52
13.	"Scales" ((Tabu Zombie))	4:54
Total length:		59:46

- UK Edition (66:43)

No.	Title	Length
14.	"Sahara" (Shacho (Brownswood Recordings re-release))	6:58
Total length:		66:43

== Credits ==
- Performed and arranged by Soil & "Pimp" Sessions
- Agitator – Shacho
- Saxophone – Motoharu
- Trumpet – Tabu Zombie
- Piano – Josei
- Bass – Akita Goldman
- Drums – Midorin
- Recorded and mixed by – Shinjiro Ideka
- Recorded at Victor Studios, Innig Studios
- Mixed at Heartbeat Recording Studios
- Assistant Engineers, Yoshiyuki Watanabe (Victor), Kimihiro Nakase (Innig), Naoya Tokunou (Heartbeat Recording)
- Mastered by Tasuji Maeda (Bernie Grundman Mastering)
- A&R Director, Yuichi Sorita
- Original Artwork, Takahi Kawanishi
- Original Design, Tetsuya Nagato (www.nagato.com)
- Photography, Akira Okimura (D-cord)
- Visual Co-ordination, Tomoro Watanabe
- European edition design, Robi Bear, wadadameanlove.com
- A&R (UK), Gilles Peterson
