= In the Mind of Jamie Cullum =

Compilation album by Jamie Cullum
- Released: 28 August 2007 (UK)
- Length: 77:23
- Label: District6

Jamie Cullum chronology
Live at Ronnie Scott's (2006)	In the Mind of Jamie Cullum (2007)	The Pursuit (2009)

Professional ratings
Review scores
Source	Rating
AllMusic	3/5 stars

In the Mind of Jamie Cullum is a compilation album by Jamie Cullum, released on 28 August 2007 in the UK and on 18 September 2007 in the US.

== Track listing ==
1. Nina Simone – "I Think It's Gonna Rain Today"
2. Luiz Bonfá – "Perdido de Amor"
3. Mark Murphy – "Stolen Moments"
4. Jamie Cullum – "I'd Probably Do It Again" (previously unreleased)
5. Laurent Garnier – "Acid Eiffel"
6. Quasimoto – "Jazz Cats Pt. 1"
7. Charles Mingus – "Fables of Faubus"
8. Jamie Cullum – "After You've Gone" (previously unreleased)
9. Donovan – "Get Thy Bearings"
10. Elbow – "Station Approach"
11. Cinematic Orchestra – "All Things to All Men"
12. Herbie Hancock – "Nobu"
13. Roni Size – "Brown Paper Bag"
14. Clipse & Pharrell – "Mr Me Too"
15. The Bad Plus – "Flim"
16. Polyphony & Stephen Layton – "Sleep"

Jamie Cullum and Ben Cullum launched the album at the Forum in London on 7 September, and played a gig in support of it on the same day.
