= 6 (Soil & "Pimp" Sessions album) =

Studio album by Soil & "Pimp" Sessions
- Released: September 16, 2009
- Genres: Jazz, jazz fusion, death jazz
- Length: 58:05
- Label: Victor

Soil & "Pimp" Sessions chronology
Planet Pimp' (2008)	6 (2009)	Stoned Pirates Radio (2007)

6 is the sixth studio album by pioneering jazz group Soil & "Pimp" Sessions, from Japan. It was released on September 16, 2009.

== Track listing ==
No.	Title	Length
1.	"Seven (Intro Sound Collage By DJ Kentaro)"	2:59
2.	"Keizoku"	2:58
3.	"Papa's Got A Brand New Pigbag"	6:09
4.	"My Foolish Heart - Crazy In Mind"	4:30
5.	"Double Trouble"	1:13
6.	"Pop Korn"	4:05
7.	"Quarter And Chronometer"	5:24
8.	"Paraiso"	3:48
9.	"My Foolish Heart - Crazy On Earth (featuring Ringo Sheena)"	4:22
10.	"Mirror Boy"	6:09
11.	"Stolen Moments (featuring Jamie Cullum)"	7:28
12.	"After The Party"	4:19
13.	"Satsuriki In Heiwa"	4:41
Total length:		58:05

== Credits ==
- Performed and arranged by Soil & "Pimp" Sessions
- Toasting [Agitator] – Shacho
- Saxophone – Motoharu
- Trumpet – Tabu Zombie
- Piano – Josei
- Bass – Akita Goldman
- Drums – Midorin
- Mastered by Yasuji Maeda
- Recorded and mixed by Shinjiro Ikeda (tracks 1, 2, 3, 5, 6, 7, 8, 9, 10, 11, 12 & 13), Kiyoshi Kusaka (Dogugumi) (track 4 & 12)
- Executive Producer – Akira Sekiguchi (Victor), Katsunori Ueda (Victor)
- Assistant Engineers – Yoshiyuki Watanabe, Takamitsu Kuwano, Takahiro Okubo (Victor Studio), Keysuke Fujimaki, Yuji Nakamura (Heart beat), Takahito Yamamoto (Avaco Creative Studio), Masahito Komori (Bunkamura Studio)
- A&R, Director – Yuichi Sorita (Victor)
- Artist Promotion – Ryuichi Ishimaru, Toyonobu Hatayama (Victor)
- Sales Promotion – Wataru Oka (Victor)
- Artwork by [Art Direction] – Joe Satake (Schnabel Effects)
- Photography - Masayuki Shioda
