= Magnetic Soil =

Studio album by Soil & "Pimp" Sessions
- Released: October 5, 2011
- Genre: Jazz, Jazz Fusion, Death Jazz
- Length: 63:03
- Label: Victor

Soil & "Pimp" Sessions chronology
Stoned Pirates Radio (2010)	Magnetic Soil (2011)	Circles (2013)

Magnetic Soil is the seventh studio album by pioneering jazz group Soil & "Pimp" Sessions, from Japan. It was released on October 5, 2011.

== Track listing ==
No.	Title	Length
1.	"Sexual Hungry"	3:01
2.	"Some Skunk Funk"	4:47
3.	"MOVIN’ featuring Maia Hirasawa"	3:26
4.	"JUNK"	4:00
5.	"Do-Re-Mi"	3:23
6.	"Deep Inside"	5:53
7.	"Freedom Time"	6:46
8.	"Above The Crowd"	4:58
9.	"A DECADE"	3:33
10.	"Moon At Noon"	4:08
11.	"ASA"	0:04
12.	"Jazzman In The Rave"	5:50
13.	"Tell Me A Bet Time Story"	1:09
14.	"Awesome Knowledge"	6:54
15.	"Summer Goddess (Son Of Goddess Version) Bonus Track"	5:04
Total length:		63:03

== Credits ==
- Performed and arranged by Soil & "Pimp" Sessions
- Toasting [Agitator] – Shacho
- Saxophone – Motoharu
- Trumpet – Tabu Zombie
- Piano – Josei
- Bass – Akita Goldman
- Drums – Midorin
- Additional musicians - Maia Hirasawa (vocal on track 3), Seiji Fukuwa (Percussion on track 7)
- Mastered by Yasuji Maeda (Bernie Grundman Mastering)
- Recorded and mixed by Shinjiro Ikeda (except track 8), Kiyoshi Kusaka (track 8)
- Executive Producer – Minoru Iwabuchi, Naoki Toyoshima (Victor)
- Assistant Engineers – Hiromitsu Takasu, Takamitsu Kuwano, Ryota Hattanda, Shu Saida (Victor Studio), Yasuhiro Nakajima (Heart Beat Recording Studio)
- A&R, Director – Yuichi Sorita (Victor)
- Public Relations - Toyonobu Hatayama (Victor)
- Artist Management - Yuka Goto (Victor)
- Promotion Staff - Satoshi Yamagami, Yohei Suzuki, Junko Yamamoto, Aya Koizumi, Tsubasa Sato (GMpV / Victor)
- Artwork by 'HATCH' Hachinohe
- Photography - Rui Hashimoto (Sound Shooter)
- Design – Satoshi Suzuki
- Creative Coordination – Tomoro Watanabe (Lodge ALASKA)
