= I'm All Over It =

"I'm All Over It – EP"

Single by Jamie Cullum

from the album The Pursuit
- Released: 2 November 2009
- Recorded: 2009
- Genre: Jazz-pop; crossover jazz
- Songwriters: Jamie Cullum; Ricky Ross
- Producer: Greg Wells

Jamie Cullum singles chronology
"Photograph" (2006)	"I'm All Over It – EP" (2009)	"Don't Stop the Music" (2010)

"I'm All Over It" is the first single from The Pursuit, the fifth studio album by Jamie Cullum. It was released on 2 November 2009 and entered the UK top 75 at No. 55, up from No. 92 the week before.

Cullum explained: "I'd split up with someone and met the love of my life so this is a break-up song about feeling heartbroken then having that moment where the switch flips and you realise you're fine. It's an example of me writing lyrics that appear to make sense but don't necessarily when you try and pick them apart. It's the snappiest, poppiest song I've ever done and it was written in 90 minutes."

The song is also featured in the "Argument" advert for Vodafone (2010)

== Charts ==
Weekly chart performance for "I'm All Over It"
Chart (2009–2010)	Peak position
Belgium (Ultratip Bubbling Under Flanders)	8
Belgium (Ultratip Bubbling Under Wallonia)	12
Germany (GfK)	93
Japan Hot 100 (Billboard Japan)	6
Netherlands (Dutch Top 40 Tipparade)	4
Netherlands (Single Top 100)	63
Netherlands (TMF Superchart)	32
UK Singles (OCC)	55

Annual chart rankings for "I'm All Over It"
Chart (2010)	Rank
Japan Adult Contemporary (Billboard Japan)	34

== Track listing ==
1. "I'm All Over It (Album version)" – 3:40
2. "So They Say" – 4:54
3. "I'm All Over It" (video clip) – 3:45 (iTunes Music Store release.)
