= The Pursuit (album) =

Studio album by Jamie Cullum
- Released: 10 November 2009
- Genre: Crossover jazz; pop
- Label: Decca; Verve Forecast (US)
- Producer: Greg Wells; Martin Terefe

Jamie Cullum chronology
In the Mind of Jamie Cullum (2007)	The Pursuit (2009)	Momentum (2013)

Singles from The Pursuit
- 1. "I'm All Over It" Released: 2 November 2009; 2. "Don't Stop the Music" Released: 2010; 3. "Wheels" Released: 2010; 4. "Love Ain't Gonna Let You Down" Released: 2010

Professional ratings
Aggregate scores
Source	Rating
AnyDecentMusic?	6.5/10
Metacritic	72/100
Review scores
Source	Rating
Allmusic	3.5/5 stars

The Pursuit is the fifth studio album by Jamie Cullum. It was released on 10 November 2009 in the United Kingdom, and released in the United States and Canada on 2 March 2010. It was produced by Greg Wells and Martin Terefe, and mixed by Greg Wells, Thomas Juth and Ryan Hewitt. The album's title is taken from the novel The Pursuit of Love by Nancy Mitford. The album was recorded at a Los Angeles studio using songs that Cullum originally recorded at his Shepherd's Bush recording studio, Terrified Studios. The song "Mixtape" features Sophie Dahl on backing vocals.

The first single from the album, "I'm All Over It", was released on 2 November 2009.

Music Week critic Andy Morris states in his review of the album, "The Cole Porter cover at the start won't surprise you, but the house track at the end just might. Cullum's fifth album does justice to his musical influences: from the Portishead-tinged 'If I Ruled The World' to the wonky groove of 'We Run Things', it's bold, experimental and the best thing Cullum's done."

Both the track listing and the cover-art for the album were released on 27 August 2009, art directed by Sacha (Spencer Trace) Teulon.

== Track listing ==
Track #	Song	Songwriter(s)	Length	Notes
1	"Just One of Those Things"	Cole Porter	4:35	
2	"I'm All Over It"	Cullum, Ricky Ross	3:40	
3	"Wheels"	Cullum	3:43	
4	"If I Ruled the World"	Leslie Bricusse and Cyril Ornadel	4:36	
5	"You and Me Are Gone"	Cullum, Geoff Gascoyne, Sebastian de Krom	5:05	
6	"Don't Stop the Music"	Tor Erik Hermansen, Mikkel Stroleer Eriksen, Frankie Storm & Michael Jackson	4:49	Cover of Rihanna song
7	"Love Ain't Gonna Let You Down"	Cullum	3:57	
8	"Mixtape"	Cullum, Ben Cullum	4:58	
9	"I Think, I Love"	Cullum	4:16	
10	"We Run Things"	Cullum	3:31	
11	"Not While I'm Around"	Stephen Sondheim	3:32	From the musical Sweeney Todd
12	"Music Is Through"	Cullum, Ben Cullum	7:07	
13	"I Love This"	Cullum, Ben Cullum	4:45	US/Canada edition bonus track
14	"Gran Torino"	Music: Clint Eastwood, Cullum, Kyle Eastwood, Michael Stevens; Lyrics: Cullum	4:32	US/Canada and UK edition bonus track
15	"The Move on Song"	Cullum	3:47	US/Canada edition bonus track
16	"Grace is Gone"	Cullum	3:06	UK edition bonus track

== Charts and certifications ==
=== Weekly charts ===
Weekly chart performance for The Pursuit
Chart (2009–2010)	Peak position
Australian Albums (ARIA)	60
Austrian Albums (Ö3 Austria)	24
Belgian Albums (Ultratop Flanders)	25
Belgian Albums (Ultratop Wallonia)	33
Danish Albums (Hitlisten)	40
Dutch Albums (Album Top 100)	11
French Albums (SNEP)	18
German Albums (Offizielle Top 100)	11
Greek Albums (IFPI)	40
Italian Albums (FIMI)	95
Norwegian Albums (VG-lista)	40
Portuguese Albums (AFP)	25
Scottish Albums (OCC)	21
Spanish Albums (Promusicae)	15
Swedish Albums (Sverigetopplistan)	46
Swiss Albums (Schweizer Hitparade)	7
UK Albums (OCC)	16
UK Jazz & Blues Albums (OCC)	1
UK Album Downloads (OCC)	9
US Billboard 200	42
US Top Jazz Albums (Billboard)	2
US Top Rock Albums (Billboard)	7

=== Year-end charts ===
2009 year-end chart performance for The Pursuit
Chart (2009)	Position
UK Albums (OCC)	194

2010 year-end chart performance for The Pursuit
Chart (2010)	Position
US Top Jazz Albums (Billboard)	10

=== Certifications and sales ===
Certifications and sales for The Pursuit
Region	Certification	Certified units/sales
Germany (BVMI)	Gold	100,000^{^}
United Kingdom (BPI)	Gold	100,000^{*}
Summaries
Worldwide	—	700,000
^{*} Sales figures based on certification alone.^{^} Shipments figures based on certification alone.

== Release history ==
Release history and formats for The Pursuit
Country	Date	Format	Label
United Kingdom	10 November 2009	CD, Digital download	Decca
United States	2 March 2010	CD, Digital download	Verve Forecast
Canada	2 March 2010	CD, Digital download	Universal Music
