= Pointless Nostalgic =

Studio album by Jamie Cullum
- Released: 15 July 2002
- Genre: Vocal jazz; crossover jazz
- Length: 55:31
- Label: Candid
- Producer: Alan Bates

Jamie Cullum chronology
Heard It All Before (1999)	Pointless Nostalgic (2002)	Twentysomething (2003)

Singles from Pointless Nostalgic
- 1. "High and Dry" Released: 2002

Professional ratings
Review scores
Source	Rating
Allmusic	4/5 stars
BBC Online	(favourable)

Pointless Nostalgic is the second studio album by English singer Jamie Cullum. It was released by Candid Records on 15 July 2002 in the United Kingdom. His first major release on a record label, the album was recorded at Clowns Pocket Recording Studio, Bexley, Kent by Derek Nash, who also co-produced Pointless Nostalgic.

== Track listing ==
All tracks produced by Alan Bates.

Pointless Nostalgic track listing
No.	Title	Writer(s)	Length
1.	"You and the Night and the Music"	Howard Dietz, Arthur Schwartz	4:09
2.	"I Can't Get Started"	Vernon Duke, Ira Gershwin	5:15
3.	"Devil May Care"	Bob Dorough	3:24
4.	"You're Nobody till Somebody Loves You"	James Cavanaugh, Russ Morgan, Larry Stock	3:43
5.	"Pointless Nostalgic"	Jamie Cullum, Ben Cullum	4:03
6.	"In the Wee Small Hours of the Morning"	Bob Hilliard, David Mann	6:28
7.	"Well, You Needn't"	Thelonious Monk	3:21
8.	"It Ain't Necessarily So"	George Gershwin, I. Gershwin	4:31
9.	"High and Dry"	Colin Greenwood, Ed O'Brien, Jonny Greenwood, Philip Selway, Thom Yorke	4:54
10.	"Too Close For Comfort"	Jerry Bock, Larry Holofcener, George David Weiss	3:25
11.	"A Time for Love"	Johnny Mandel, Paul Francis Webster	5:06
12.	"Lookin' Good"	Dave Frishberg	3:10
13.	"I Want to Be a Popstar"	J. Cullum	4:02
Total length:			55:31

== Musicians ==
- Jamie Cullum – piano, vocals
- Martin Shaw – trumpet
- Martin Gladdish – trombone
- Matt Wates – alto saxophone
- Dave O'Higgins – tenor saxophone
- Ben Castle – tenor saxophone
- Geoff Gascoyne – bass
- Sebastiaan de Krom – drums

== Charts ==
Weekly chart performance for Pointless Nostalgic
Chart (2002–03)	Peak position
Finnish Albums (Suomen virallinen lista)	14
French Albums (SNEP)	177
UK Albums (OCC)	55

== Certifications ==
Certifications for Pointless Nostalgic
Region	Certification	Certified units/sales
United Kingdom (BPI)	Gold	100,000^{^}
^{^} Shipments figures based on certification alone.
