= Taller (album) =

Studio album by Jamie Cullum
- Released: 7 June 2019
- Label: Island
- Producer: Jamie Cullum; Troy Miller

Jamie Cullum chronology
Interlude (2014)	Taller (2019)	The Pianoman at Christmas (2020)

Singles from Taller
- 1. "Work of Art" Released: 17 February 2017; 2. "Taller" Released: 3 May 2019; 3. "Drink" Released: 8 May 2019; 4. "The Age of Anxiety" Released: 31 May 2019

Taller is the eighth studio album by British jazz musician Jamie Cullum, released through Island Records on 7 June 2019.

== Background ==
Cullum divulged that the title of the album was a reference to attention toward his height in comparison to that of his wife, Sophie Dahl, quipping that he "managed to completely break one of the laws of the universe by marrying a taller woman and it was quite interesting how much that was talked about".

== Release and promotion ==
During the 2018 Montreux Jazz Festival, Cullum premiered the tracks "Taller" and "Mankind" from the album. The album's title track was made available along with pre-orders of the album in May 2019. Ahead of its release, two additional songs were made available on music streaming services: "Drink" and "The Age of Anxiety" on 8 May and 31 May, respectively.

Cullum announced in May 2019 that he was set to embark on a tour across the United Kingdom to support the album in March 2020. In Dave Simpson's review of Cullum's performance at the York Barbican for The Guardian, he deemed some of Cullum's routines "well-worn" but praised Cullum's versatility as well as his "aplomb".

== Critical reception ==
Awarding the album four stars out of five, Matt Collar of AllMusic regarded Taller as "sophisticated and emotionally unguarded". The album was also chosen as one of the Evening Standard's albums of the week on 7 June 2019. Writing for the publication, Andre Paine deemed the album a "bold reinvention". Conversely, Steven Wine of the Associated Press noted that the album was "stylistically scattershot" but that "there’s something for everyone".

== Track listing ==
Track listing and credits adapted from Tidal.

All tracks are written by Jamie Cullum, except where noted.

No.	Title	Writer(s)	Producer(s)	Length
1.	"Taller"	Cullum; Simon Aldred	Cullum; Troy Miller	3:36
2.	"Life Is Grey"		Miller	4:49
3.	"Mankind"		Miller	4:19
4.	"Usher"	Ben Cullum; Cullum	Miller	3:33
5.	"The Age of Anxiety"		Miller	5:24
6.	"For the Love"	Cullum; Jayson DeZuzio; Martin Terefe; Sasha Sloan	Miller	3:25
7.	"Drink"		Miller	3:50
8.	"You Can’t Hideaway from Love"		Cullum; Miller	3:08
9.	"Monster"	Cullum; Jamie Hartman	Miller	4:00
10.	"Endings are Beginnings"		Cullum; Miller	3:09
Total length:				39:21

Deluxe edition bonus tracks
No.	Title	Writer(s)	Producer(s)	Length
11.	"Love Is in the Picture"		Greg Wells	3:38
12.	"Work of Art"		Miller	3:48
13.	"The Man" (The Killers cover)	Brandon Flowers; Claydes Smith; Dave Keuning; Dennis Thomas; Donald Boyce; Garret Lee; George Brown; Mark Stoermer; Otha Nash; Richard Westfield; Robert Earl Bell; Robert Mickens; Ronald Bell; Ronnie Vannucci Jr.	Benedic Lamdin	3:34
14.	"Good Luck with Your Demons" (demo)		Terefe	3:21
15.	"Marlon Brando" (demo)	Cullum; Jean Baptiste; Aldred	Terefe	3:26
16.	"Show Me the Magic" (demo)		Lamdin	2:30
Total length:				59:29

Japanese CD bonus track
No.	Title	Length
17.	"Dream My Girls" (demo)	3:54
Total length:		63:35

Expanded edition bonus tracks
No.	Title	Length
17.	"It's Christmas"	3:01
18.	"Christmas Don't Let Me Down"	3:36
19.	"Bury a Friend" (Cover (Song Society Volume 2))	3:21
20.	"Love It If We Made It" (Cover (Song Society Volume 2))	3:53
21.	"Hey Ma" (Cover (Song Society Volume 2))	4:51
22.	"Boyfriend" (Cover (Song Society Volume 2))	4:56
23.	"(Looking For) The Heart of Saturday Night" (Cover (Song Society Volume 2))	3:48
24.	"The Masquerade Is Over" (Cover (Song Society Volume 2))	4:14

== Charts ==
Chart (2019–2021)	Peak position
Austrian Albums (Ö3 Austria)	17
Belgian Albums (Ultratop Flanders)	9
Belgian Albums (Ultratop Wallonia)	166
Dutch Albums (Album Top 100)	55
French Albums (SNEP)	141
German Albums (Offizielle Top 100)	16
Japanese Albums (Oricon)	177
Portuguese Albums (AFP)	15
Scottish Albums (OCC)	19
Spanish Albums (PROMUSICAE)	17
Swiss Albums (Schweizer Hitparade)	15
UK Albums (OCC)	17
