= Soil & "Pimp" Sessions =

Japanese jazz group

SOIL&"PIMP"SESSIONS
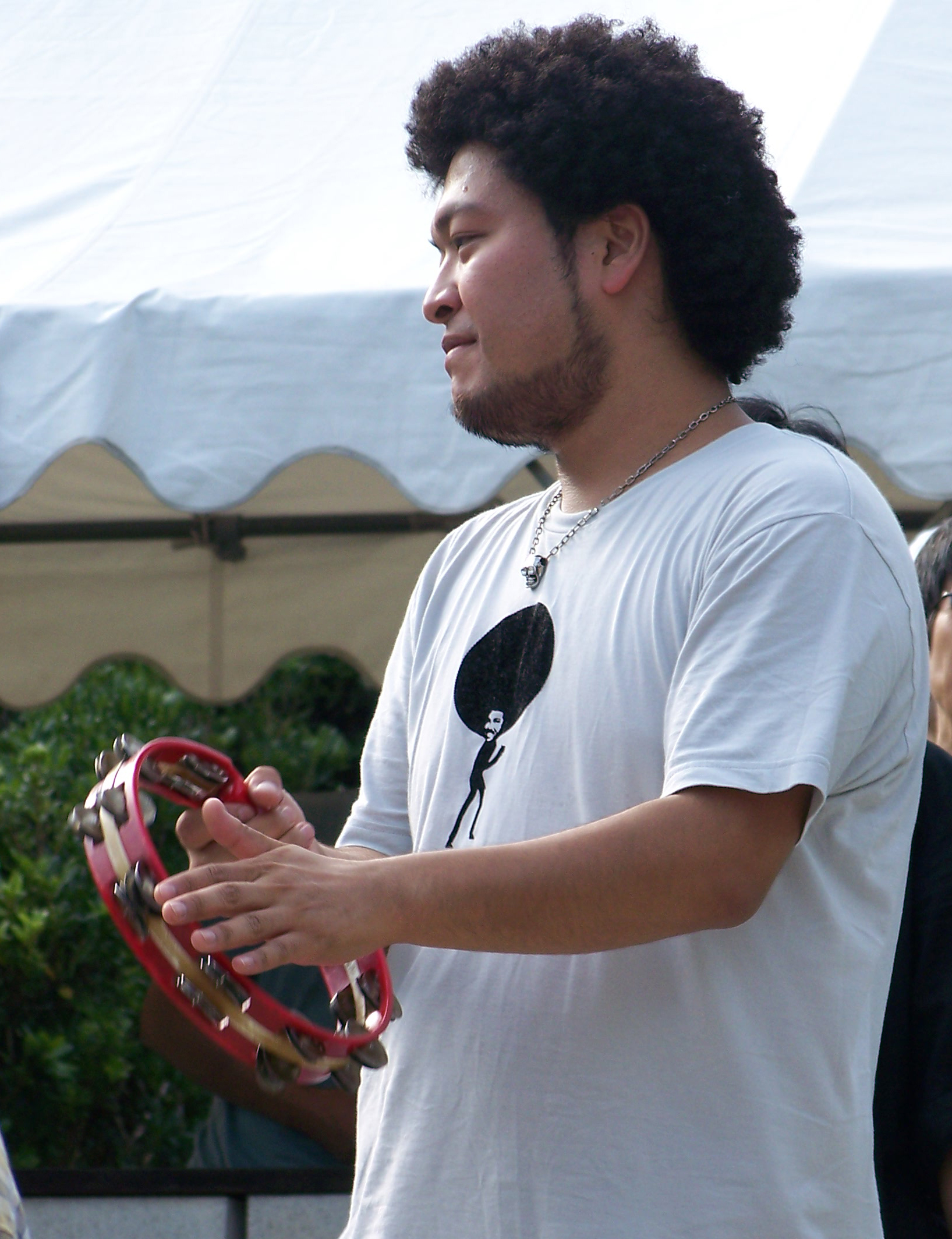
- Midorin, former drummer for Soil & "Pimp" Sessions, in Iwaki, Fukishima, Japan

Background information
- Origin: Tokyo, Japan
- Genres: Jazz, punk jazz, bebop, bossa nova, Death Jazz
- Years active: 2001–present
- Labels: JVC Music; Brownswood Recordings
- Members: Shacho; Tabu Zombie; Josei; Akita Goldman
- Past members: Motoharu; Midorin
- Website: www.jvcmusic.co.jp/soilpimp/

Soil & "Pimp" Sessions (stylised as SOIL&"PIMP"SESSIONS) is a Japanese club jazz sextet who formed in Tokyo, Japan, in 2001. They are known for their energetic live performances, having coined the term "death jazz" to describe their music.

== History ==
The band was born out of Tokyo's club scene, when Shacho and Tabu Zombie started including live jam sessions in DJ sets. Gradually the other members were invited, the band's line-up was finalised and the DJ sets dropped.

The band's live sets started to create a buzz on the Tokyo live scene, and in 2003 they became the first unsigned band to perform at Japan's Fuji Rock Festival. They were well received there and in the following months record companies were scrambling to offer contracts. JVC Victor won the battle, and summer 2004 saw the release of the mini-album Pimpin'.

The album was a critical and commercial success, and this together with constant touring paved the way for the release of their first full album, Pimp Master in early 2005. The album captures the power of their live performances as well as highlighting their individual musical talents. Two tracks in particular, "Waltz For Goddess" and their cover of "A Wheel Within a Wheel", caught the attention of DJs abroad, and they began to receive heavy air-play on Gilles Peterson's Worldwide radio program on BBC Radio 1 in the U.K.

Summer 2005 was a busy time for the band, with the release of their second mini-album, Summer Goddess, and their first live dates outside Japan. Gilles Peterson invited them to play at Cargo in London, and Jazzanova invited them to play in Berlin.

They spent the rest of the year touring in Japan and Europe, and they were also featured in the live broadcast of the Gilles Peterson Worldwide Awards in 2005, where they were awarded the John Peel Play More Jazz Award.

A second full album, Pimp of the Year, was released in spring 2006, showcasing innovations that showed a development of their sound, as well as one or two tracks that marked a new departure.

2006 also saw the official release of Pimp Master in Europe on Compost Records and the UK on Gilles Peterson's Brownswood Recordings label. They continued touring constantly throughout the year, taking in Britain, Italy, France, Serbia, Belgium, Germany, Slovakia and Croatia, as well as an appearance at the Montreux Jazz Festival.

March 2007 saw the release of their third full album, Pimpoint, on the Victor Entertainment label, which features thirteen tracks.

Soil & "Pimp" Sessions' song "Paraiso" is the opening theme for the anime Michiko to Hatchin.

A side project, called "J.A.M.", was formed by members Josei (piano), Akita Goldman (double bass) and Midorin (drums) in 2007. The name of the band is derived from the first letters of each member's name. The project features a notable different sound, combining house, hip-hop and the "rocking jazz of now". The band has released four albums, with their first album, Just A Maestro, being released in 2008, followed by Just Another Mind in 2010, Jazz Acoustic Machine in 2012 and Silent Notes in 2017.

"Agitator" Shacho announced during their performance at the Relentless Garage in London that their latest album 6 was due for release on 26 April 2010 in the United Kingdom. No other release locations were confirmed by him at the time.

On 8 December 2010, Soil and "Pimp" Sessions released their album, "SOIL&"PIMP"SESSIONS Presents STONED PIRATES RADIO", containing 20 tracks. All of the tracks (aside from the occasional skit tracks) are covers, arranged in various ways using their style. From reggae to calypso to their aggressive jazz sound, you can hear tracks like "Walkie-Talkie Man," "Beat It," and "Imagine."

Around September 2011, they announced that a new album will be released shortly, and that release was "MAGNETIC SOIL", containing all new material of 15 tracks (except track 2 is their rendition of the Brecker Brothers' piece "Some Skunk Funk"), including a new version of the track "Summer Goddess."

On August 7, 2013, they released their ninth album, Circles, which featured collaborations with Japanese artists from various genres, including Miyavi, Rhymester and Ringo Sheena. The album also featured a track, titled "Summer Love", featuring American Jazz hip-hop vocalist José James. Tim Conley aka MAST plays guitar on track 8 "記憶の旅 (Kioku no Tavi)".

At the end of 2016, Motoharu (Sax) left the band and they entered a "charging phase", meaning they were on hiatus. In 2017, the band returned without Motoharu with the release of their album "Music from and inspired by Hello Harinezumi". The band were joined by Takeshi Kurihara (Sax & Flute) on this and all future albums.

In June 2023, Midorin was arrested for possession of marijuana; the band subsequently mutually agreed to part ways with Midorin.

=== Members ===
- President a.k.a. Shacho (久嶋識史), born January 18, 1978, in Takefu, Fukui Prefecture, agitator
- Tabu Zombie (椨智紹), born April 13, 1977, in Kagoshima, Kagoshima Prefecture, trumpet
- Josei (佐藤丈青), born October 30, 1975, in the Saeki-ku Ward of Hiroshima, Hiroshima Prefecture, piano, keyboards
- Akita Goldman (秋田紀彰), born July 8, 1977, in Hachiōji, Tokyo, double bass

=== Support musicians ===
- Takeshi Kurihara (栗原 健), saxophone, flute

=== Former members ===
- Motoharu (深田元晴), born June 29, 1973, in Nayoro, Hokkaido, saxophone
- Midorin (緑川直人), born January 30, 1978, in Iwaki, Fukushima Prefecture, drums

== Discography ==
=== Studio albums ===
Year	Album Information	Oricon albums charts	Reported sales
2004	Pimpin': Released: June 23, 2004; Label: Victor Entertainment (VICL-61421); Formats: CD, digital download	260	2,000
2005	Pimp Master: Released: June 23, 2005; Label: Victor (VICL-61566); Brownswood Recordings (BW001CD); Formats: CD, digital download	80	8,300
2006	Pimp of the Year: Released: March 8, 2006; Label: Victor (VICL-61892); Formats: CD, digital download	59	12,000
2007	Pimpoint: Released: March 7, 2007; Label: Victor (VICL-61892); Brownswood (BWOOD019CD); Formats: CD, digital download	38	15,000
2008	Planet Pimp: Released: May 21, 2008; Label: Victor (VICL-62828); Brownswood (BWOOD033CD); Formats: CD, digital download	33	12,000
2009	6: Released: September 16, 2009; Label: Victor (VICL-63376); Brownswood (BWOOD44CD); Formats: CD, digital download	36	8,900
2010	Stoned Pirates Radio: Cover album; Released: December 8, 2010; Label: Victor (VICL-63684); Formats: CD, digital download	79	3,400
2011	Magnetic Soil: Released: October 5, 2011; Label: Victor (VICL-63788); Formats: CD, digital download	44	5,000
2013	Circles: Released: August 7, 2013; Label: Victor (VICL-64049 and VIZL-563); Formats: CD, digital download	15	11,000
2014	Brothers & Sisters: Released: September 3, 2014; Label: Victor (VICL-64205 and VIZL-709); Formats: CD, Vinyl, digital download	42	-
2016	Black Track: Released: April 6, 2016; Label: Victor (VICL-64559 and VIZL-947); Formats:CD, digital download	19	-
2017	Music from and inspired by Hello Harinezumi: Released: August 23, 2017; Label: Victor (VICL-64835); Formats:CD, digital download	91	-
2018	Dapper: Released: May 09, 2018; Label: Victor (VICL-64953); Formats:CD, digital download	-	
2019	Outside OST for Anime series "Blue Eyed Monster": Released: August 28, 2019; Label: Victor (VTCL-60505); Formats:CD, digital download	-	-
2019	Man Steals the Stars: Released: December 4, 2019; Label: Victor (VICL-65274 and VIZL-1672); Formats:CD, DVD, digital download	51	-
2021	The Essence of Soil: Released: March 17, 2021; Label: Victor (VICL-70245); Formats:CD, digital download	88	-
2022	Lost in Tokyo: Released: June 8, 2022; Label: Victor (VICL-65701 and VIZL-2060); Formats:CD, DVD, digital download	-	-

=== Live albums ===
Year	Album Information	Oricon albums charts	Reported sales
2015	A Night in South Blue Mountain: Released: October 7, 2015; Label: Victor (VICL-70190); Formats: CD, digital download; Tracks: 1. Suffocation (4:49); 2. Jazz Crime (8:26); 3. First Lady (8:35); 4. Mr. Clean (9:29); 5. Montara (7:31); 6. Una Mas (9:59); 7. Spartacus Love Theme (10:07)	70	-

=== Compilation albums ===
Year	Album Information	Oricon albums charts	Reported sales
2013	X: Chronicle of Soil & "Pimp" Sessions: Released: October 23, 2013; Label: Victor (VICL-61696); Formats: CD, 2CD, digital download	43	3,800

=== Extended plays ===
Year	Album Information	Oricon albums charts	Reported sales
2005	Summer Goddess: Released: July 21, 2005; Label: Victor (VICL-61696); Formats: CD, digital download	153	3,700
2008	Live Session EP: Released: July 23, 2008; Label: Victor; Formats: Digital download (iTunes exclusive)	—	—

=== Singles ===
==== Singles as lead artist ====
Release	Title	Notes	Chart positions		Oricon sales	Album
Release	Title	Notes	Oricon singles charts	Billboard Japan Hot 100	Oricon sales	Album
2004	"Suffocaton" (サフォケーション, Safokēshon)		—	—	—	Pimp Master
2006	"Crush!"		96	—	2,300	Pimp of the Year
2007	"Mashiroke" (マシロケ)		96	—	2,300	Pimpoint
2008	"Storm"		68	—	2,700	Planet Pimp
2009	"Paraiso"	Digital download	—	—	—	6
2009	"My Foolish Heart"	Ringo Shiina collaboration, digital download	—	85	—	6
2011	"Movin'" feat. Maia Hirasawa		31	31	3,500	Magnetic Soil
2013	"Jazzy Conversation" (ジャズィ・カンヴァセイション, Jazi Kanvaseishon) feat. Rhymester		—	33	—	Circles
2013	"Koroshiya Kiki Ippatsu" feat. Ringo Sheena		14	18	12,000	Circles

==== Singles as a featured artist ====
Release	Title	Notes	Chart positions		Album
Release	Title	Notes	Oricon singles charts	Billboard Japan Hot 100	Album
2006	"Karisome Otome (Death Jazz Ver.)" (カリソメ乙女; "Temporary Virgin") (Ringo Shiina x Soil & "Pimp" Sessions)	Digital download	—	—	Heisei Fūzoku
2011	"Battle Without Honor or Humanity" (Soil & "Pimp" Sessions with Tomoyasu Hotei)	Digital download	—	—	All Time Super Guest
