= Momentum (Jamie Cullum album) =

Studio album by Jamie Cullum
- Released: 20 May 2013
- Genre: Jazz-pop; jazz; crossover jazz
- Length: 51:57
- Label: Island
- Producer: Jim Abbiss; Dan the Automator

Jamie Cullum chronology
The Pursuit (2009)	Momentum (2013)	Interlude (2014)

Professional ratings
Aggregate scores
Source	Rating
AnyDecentMusic?	5.5/10
Metacritic	69/100
Review scores
Source	Rating
AllMusic	4/5 stars
The Independent	3/5 stars

Momentum is the sixth studio album by English jazz-pop singer Jamie Cullum. It was released on 20 May 2013 by Island Records and is produced by Dan the Automator and Jim Abbiss. The album includes covers of "Love for Sale" (which he had earlier recorded for his independent album Heard It All Before) and Anthony Newley's "Pure Imagination". The song "You're Not the Only One" was written about Cullum's experience serving as a judge on the television reality series Must Be the Music.

== Track listing ==
Momentum track listing
No.	Title	Writer(s)	Length
1.	"The Same Things"	Ben Cullum / Jamie Cullum	3:46
2.	"Edge of Something"	Steve Booker / Jamie Cullum	4:40
3.	"Everything You Didn't Do"	Jamie Cullum	3:48
4.	"When I Get Famous"	Jamie Cullum	4:34
5.	"Love for $ale" (featuring Roots Manuva)	Cole Porter / Rodney Smith	5:20
6.	"Pure Imagination"	Leslie Bricusse / Anthony Newley	5:09
7.	"Anyway"	Iyiola Babalola / Jamie Cullum / Darren Lewis / Jackie Members Poindexter / Richard Poindexter	3:54
8.	"Sad, Sad World"	Jamie Cullum	4:28
9.	"Take Me Out (Of Myself)"	Jamie Cullum	3:51
10.	"Save Your Soul"	Ben Cullum / Jamie Cullum	4:19
11.	"Get a Hold of Yourself"	Jamie Cullum	3:39
12.	"You're Not the Only One"	Ben Cullum / Jamie Cullum	4:29
Total length:			51:57

Deluxe edition bonus tracks
No.	Title	Length
13.	"Momentum"	4:10
14.	"Unison"	4:57
15.	"Comes Love"	4:42
16.	"Everything You Didn't Do" (live at Abbey Road)	3:50
17.	"Sad Sad World" (featuring Laura Mvula) (live at Abbey Road)	5:11
18.	"Love for Sale" (live at Abbey Road)	4:53
19.	"Pure Imagination" (live at Abbey Road)	5:10
20.	"You're Not the Only One" (live at Abbey Road)	4:22
21.	"Save Your Soul" (live at Abbey Road)	4:19

== Charts ==
=== Weekly charts ===
Chart (2013)	Peak position
Australian Albums (ARIA)	34
Austrian Albums (Ö3 Austria)	12
Belgian Albums (Ultratop Flanders)	19
Belgian Albums (Ultratop Wallonia)	44
Danish Albums (Hitlisten)	25
Dutch Albums (Album Top 100)	27
French Albums (SNEP)	67
German Albums (Offizielle Top 100)	10
Irish Albums (IRMA)	58
Norwegian Albums (VG-lista)	24
Portuguese Albums (AFP)	5
Spanish Albums (Promusicae)	9
Swiss Albums (Schweizer Hitparade)	10
UK Albums (Official Charts)	20
US Billboard 200	156

=== Year-end charts ===
Chart (2013)	Position
Belgian Albums (Ultratop Flanders)	193
