= The Pianoman at Christmas =

Studio album by Jamie Cullum
- Released: 20 November 2020
- Length: 39:02
- Label: Island
- Producer: Greg Wells; Jamie Cullum; Tom Richards

Jamie Cullum chronology
Taller (2019)	The Pianoman at Christmas (2020)

Singles from The Pianoman at Christmas
- 1. "Turn on the Lights" Released: 9 October 2020; 2. "Hang Your Lights" Released: 6 November 2020

The Pianoman at Christmas is the ninth studio album by British jazz musician Jamie Cullum, released through Island on 20 November 2020. The album peaked at number eleven on the UK Albums Chart.

== Background ==
The album was recorded at Abbey Road Studios in Studio 2 and features fifty-seven of the UK's best musicians. The album was produced by Greg Wells.

"So much of the Christmas music we all love is stuffed full of all the things I am really drawn to in songs. Our ears seem ready from December onwards for big bands, huge orchestras, beautiful chord changes and focused, timeless lyrics. It is a world of classic songwriting that I have been operating in since the beginning of my career. So I set myself the task to try and write ten, original Christmas songs that used these skills and obsessions to create something uncynical and adventurous, full of the joys and complexities of the season, that could be something you feel like reaching for every year. I have been so lucky that every corner of this record has been touched by the world’s best – from the legendary Studio 2 at Abbey Road, to the engineers, the arrangers, the producer and mixer. I hope the care, attention to detail and sheer joy that we put into this record will bring a little magic this Christmas."

— Jamie Cullum, Jamie Cullum’s The Pianoman At Christmas Is Out Now, uDiscover Music

== Singles ==
"Turn on the Lights" was released as the lead single from the album on 9 October 2020. "Hang Your Lights" was released as the second single from the album on 6 November 2020.

== Track listing ==
All tracks are written by Jamie Cullum, except where noted. All tracks are produced by Greg Wells, Jamie Cullum and Tom Richards, except where noted.

The Pianoman at Christmas track listing
No.	Title	Length
1.	"It's Christmas"	3:14
2.	"Beautiful, Altogether"	3:30
3.	"Hang Your Lights"	4:56
4.	"The Jolly Fat Man"	3:04
5.	"The Pianoman at Christmas"	4:35
6.	"Turn on the Lights"	4:14
7.	"So Many Santas"	3:28
8.	"Christmas Never Gets Old"	2:42
9.	"How Do You Fly?"	6:01
10.	"Christmas Caught Me Crying"	3:18

Amazon exclusive extended edition bonus track
No.	Title	Writer(s)	Producer(s)	Length
11.	"In the Bleak Midwinter"	Gustav Holst	Tom Richards	4:38

== Charts ==
Chart performance for The Pianoman at Christmas
Chart (2020–2021)	Peak position
Austrian Albums (Ö3 Austria)	27
Belgian Albums (Ultratop Flanders)	25
Belgian Albums (Ultratop Wallonia)	8
French Jazz Albums (SNEP)	9
German Albums (Offizielle Top 100)	16
Irish Albums (IRMA)	82
Portuguese Albums (AFP)	19
Scottish Albums (OCC)	20
Swiss Albums (Schweizer Hitparade)	16
UK Albums (OCC)	11

== Certifications ==
Region	Certification	Certified units/sales
United Kingdom (BPI)	Silver	60,000^{‡}
^{‡} Sales+streaming figures based on certification alone.
