= Catching Tales =

Studio album by Jamie Cullum
- Released: 26 September 2005 (UK), 11 October 2005 (US)
- Studio: Rak Studios, London, England
- Genre: Vocal jazz, blue-eyed soul
- Length: 60:28
- Label: UCJ; Candid; Verve Forecast
- Producer: Stewart Levine; Dan the Automator

Jamie Cullum chronology
Twentysomething (2003)	Catching Tales (2005)	Live at Ronnie Scott's (2006)

Singles from Catching Tales
- 1. "Get Your Way" Released: 2005; 2. "Mind Trick" Released: 2005; 3. "Photograph" Released: 2006

Professional ratings
Review scores
Source	Rating
Allmusic	4/5 stars
Billboard	(positive)
MTV Asia	6/10
PopMatters	6/10
Rolling Stone	2/5 stars
Yahoo! Music UK	7/10

Catching Tales is the fourth album by Jamie Cullum. It was released in late September 2005 in the United Kingdom and a few weeks later in the United States.

== Background ==
This release followed Twentysomething, Cullum's biggest seller to date. Like that album, Cullum performs some original material as well as some covers and standards. The first single from the album was "Get Your Way", followed by "Mind Trick" later in 2005. In 2006, "Photograph" was released as a single.

Stewart Levine, producer of Twentysomething, repeated duties on this album. Additionally, renowned hip hop DJ and Gorillaz member Dan Nakamura (aka Dan the Automator) helped to produce the first track "Get Your Way".

The European version of the album features the Gershwin tune "Fascinating Rhythm", unlike the American and French versions. A deluxe edition was released and came with a DVD including an 18-minute feature entitled "Telling Tales", a behind-the-scenes documentary about the making and promotion of the album.

In the Netherlands, an exclusive Dutch edition of the album was released. This edition came with a bonus CD which includes the two songs "All at Sea" and "Everlasting Love", performed live at BNN's That's Live.

Cullum has toured extensively around the world in support of the album.

== Track listing ==
No.	Title	Writer(s)	Length
1.	"Get Your Way"	Allen Toussaint, Jamie Cullum, Dan Nakamura	4:01
2.	"London Skies"	J. Cullum, Guy Chambers	3:43
3.	"Photograph"	J. Cullum	5:47
4.	"I Only Have Eyes for You"	Al Dubin, Harry Warren	3:58
5.	"Nothing I Do"	J. Cullum	5:03
6.	"Mind Trick"	J. Cullum, Ben Cullum	4:05
7.	"21st Century Kid"	J. Cullum	4:00
8.	"I'm Glad There Is You"	Jimmy Dorsey, Paul Mertz	4:09
9.	"Oh God"	J. Cullum, Guy Chambers	3:38
10.	"Catch the Sun"	Jimi Goodwin, Jez Williams, Andy Williams	3:46
11.	"7 Days to Change Your Life"	J. Cullum	5:37
12.	"Our Day Will Come"	Mort Garson, Bob Hilliard	3:55
13.	"Back to the Ground"	J. Cullum, Ed Harcourt	4:37
14.	"Fascinating Rhythm" (UK release only)	George Gershwin, Ira Gershwin	4:49
15.	"My Yard"	J. Cullum, B. Cullum, Teron Beal	4:09

== Charts ==
=== Weekly charts ===
Chart (2005)	Peak position
Australian Albums (ARIA)	26
Austrian Albums (Ö3 Austria)	22
Belgian Albums (Ultratop Flanders)	9
Belgian Albums (Ultratop Wallonia)	26
Danish Albums (Hitlisten)	11
Dutch Albums (Album Top 100)	3
Finnish Albums (Suomen virallinen lista)	10
French Albums (SNEP)	39
German Albums (Offizielle Top 100)	30
Italian Albums (FIMI)	39
Norwegian Albums (VG-lista)	26
Portuguese Albums (AFP)	16
Scottish Albums (OCC)	10
Spanish Albums (PROMUSICAE)	16
Swedish Albums (Sverigetopplistan)	21
Swiss Albums (Schweizer Hitparade)	14
UK Albums (OCC)	4
UK Jazz & Blues Albums (OCC)	1
US Billboard 200	49
US Top Jazz Albums (Billboard)	1

=== Year-end charts ===
Chart (2005)	Position
Belgian Albums (Ultratop Flanders)	70
Dutch Albums (Album Top 100)	25
UK Albums (OCC)	111

== Certifications and sales ==
Region	Certification	Certified units/sales
Belgium (BRMA)	Gold	25,000^{*}
Denmark (IFPI Danmark)	Gold	20,000^{^}
Germany (BVMI)	Gold	100,000^{‡}
Japan	—	100,000
Netherlands (NVPI)	Platinum	80,000^{^}
United Kingdom (BPI)	Gold	250,000
Summaries
Worldwide	—	1,250,000
^{*} Sales figures based on certification alone.^{^} Shipments figures based on certification alone.^{‡} Sales+streaming figures based on certification alone.
