= Interlude (Jamie Cullum album) =

Studio album by Jamie Cullum
- Released: 6 October 2014
- Genres: Jazz; jazz-pop; big band
- Length: 43:39
- Label: Island
- Producer: Benedic Lamdin for Nostalgia 77

Jamie Cullum chronology
Momentum (2013)	Interlude (2014)	Taller (2019)

Singles from Interlude
- 1. "Don't Let Me Be Misunderstood" Released: 31 August 2014; 2. "Good Morning Heartache" Released: 2014; 3. "Don't You Know" Released: 2015

Interlude is the seventh studio album by Jamie Cullum. It was released on 6 October 2014 in the UK and 27 January 2015 in the US through Island Records, a division of Universal Music. The album was produced, engineered and mixed by Benedic Lamdin for Nostalgia 77.

The album is composed entirely of cover versions of other artists work including songs written by Ray Charles, Randy Newman, Sufjan Stevens and Dizzy Gillespie. Featured performers on the album include Gregory Porter ("Don't Let Me Be Misunderstood") and Laura Mvula ("Good Morning Heartache").

== Reception ==
Professional ratings
Review scores
Source	Rating
AllMusic	4/5 stars
Elmore Magazine	75/100
Harper's Bazaar	3/5 stars
The New York Times	positive
Renowned for Sound	4/5 stars
Rolling Stone	positive
Spectrum Culture	2.75/5
The Telegraph	4/5 stars
The Times of India	3.5/5 stars

The album has received generally favourable reviews from critics. The Daily Telegraph included the album on its list of The 33 best jazz albums of 2014 where music critic Helen Brown rated the album four-out-of-five stars and claims: "This record finally captures the warmth, passion and spontaneity of Cullum's live gigs." In his review for AllMusic, Stephen Thomas Erlewine gives the album four-out-of-five stars and notes "Cullum seems reinvigorated. He's enjoying tearing into these old tunes and that excitement isn't merely palpable, it's contagious."

== Track listing ==
Standard edition
No.	Title	Writer(s)	Length
1.	"Interlude"	Dizzy Gillespie / Raymond Leveen / Frank Paparelli	3:27
2.	"Don't You Know"	Ray Charles	2:56
3.	"The Seer's Tower"	Sufjan Stevens	3:55
4.	"Walkin'"	Richard Carpenter	2:42
5.	"Good Morning Heartache" (featuring Laura Mvula)	Ervin Drake / Dan Fisher / Irene Higginbotham	3:32
6.	"Sack O'Woe"	Cannonball Adderley / Jon Hendricks	3:45
7.	"Don't Let Me Be Misunderstood" (featuring Gregory Porter)	Bennie Benjamin / Gloria Caldwell / Sol Marcus	2:58
8.	"My One and Only Love"	Robert Mellin / Guy B. Wood	4:32
9.	"Lovesick Blues"	Cliff Friend / Irving Mills	3:07
10.	"Losing You"	Randy Newman	3:24
11.	"Out of This World"	Harold Arlen / Johnny Mercer	5:51
12.	"Make Someone Happy"	Betty Comden / Adolph Green / Jule Styne	3:30
Total length:			43:39

The deluxe edition of the album includes a DVD of Cullum's 17-song live performance filmed at the 2014 Jazz à Vienne Festival

== Charts ==
Chart (2014)	Peak position
Austrian Albums (Ö3 Austria)	23
Belgian Albums (Ultratop Flanders)	25
Belgian Albums (Ultratop Wallonia)	36
Dutch Albums (Album Top 100)	42
French Albums (SNEP)	31
German Albums (Offizielle Top 100)	13
Portuguese Albums (AFP)	11
Spanish Albums (Promusicae)	22
Swiss Albums (Schweizer Hitparade)	14
UK Albums (Official Charts)	19
US Billboard 200	154
US Top Jazz Albums (Billboard)	3
