= Twentysomething (album) =

Studio album by Jamie Cullum
- Released: 20 October 2003
- Recorded: June–July 2003
- Studios: Mayfair, London
- Genre: Jazz
- Length: 57:08 (original edition); 73:36 (UK special edition); 62:53 (US edition)
- Labels: UCJ; Candid; Verve
- Producer: Stewart Levine

Jamie Cullum chronology
Pointless Nostalgic (2002)	Twentysomething (2003)	Catching Tales (2005)

Singles from Twentysomething
- 1. "All at Sea" Released: 2003; 2. "These Are the Days"/"Frontin'" Released: 2004; 3. "The Wind Cries Mary" Released: 2004; 4. "Everlasting Love" Released: 2004

Twentysomething is the third studio album by English singer Jamie Cullum. It was released on 20 October 2003 in Europe, and in May 2004 in the United States. The album has sold 2.5 million copies worldwide, and achieved eleven platinum, eleven gold and two silver certifications. It is the fastest-selling jazz album in chart history and its sales led to Cullum ending 2003 as the UK's highest-selling jazz artist in history.

On this release, Cullum performs original material as well as covers and standards. The lead single from the album was "All at Sea" and "These Are The Days/Frontin'" was the highest-charting single at number 12 on the UK Singles Chart.

== Critical reception ==
Professional ratings
Review scores
Source	Rating
AllMusic	4/5 stars
The Guardian	3/5 stars
MTV Asia	7/10
The Village Voice	B−

In a review for The Village Voice, Robert Christgau wrote: "This Brit is good enough at what he does to make you wonder why he bothers. With Norah Jones putting young-person-with-old-ideas shtick in the bank, the commercial logic we get. But beyond a cross-generational reach achievable in any genre and a swinging musicality he negotiates with too much heavy breathing, what's the artistic payoff?" John Fordham wrote: "The point of the disc is the songs, and in both the choice of the material and the range of interpretation, Jamie Cullum's ability to learn fast and listen hard has undoubtedly made this set a leap forward from his self-generated Pointless Nostalgic debut".

== Track listing ==
UK version
No.	Title	Writer(s)	Length
1.	"What a Difference a Day Made"	Stanley Adams, María Grever	5:09
2.	"These Are the Days"	Ben Cullum	3:21
3.	"Singin' in the Rain"	Arthur Freed, Nacio Herb Brown	4:07
4.	"Twentysomething"	Jamie Cullum	3:40
5.	"But for Now"	Bob Dorough	3:55
6.	"Old Devil Moon"	Burton Lane, Yip Harburg	4:11
7.	"I Could Have Danced All Night"	Alan Jay Lerner, Frederick Loewe	3:24
8.	"Blame It on My Youth"	Oscar Levant, Edward Heyman	3:10
9.	"I Get a Kick Out of You"	Cole Porter	4:10
10.	"All at Sea"	J. Cullum	4:32
11.	"The Wind Cries Mary"	Jimi Hendrix	3:36
12.	"Lover, You Should Have Come Over"	Jeff Buckley	4:48
13.	"It's About Time"	B. Cullum	4:07
14.	"Next Year Baby"	J. Cullum	4:58
Total length:			57:08

US edition
No.	Title	Writer(s)	Length
1.	"These Are the Days"	B. Cullum	3:21
2.	"Twentysomething"	J. Cullum	3:40
3.	"The Wind Cries Mary"	J. Hendrix	3:35
4.	"All at Sea"	J. Cullum	4:33
5.	"Lover, You Should Have Come Over"	J. Buckley	4:48
6.	"Singin' in the Rain"	A. Freed, N. Brown	4:07
7.	"I Get a Kick Out of You"	C. Porter	4:10
8.	"Blame It on My Youth"	Levant, Heyman	3:11
9.	"High and Dry"	C. Greenwood, E. O'Brien, J. Greenwood, T. Selway, M. Yorke	4:18
10.	"It's About Time"	B. Cullum	4:06
11.	"But for Now"	B. Dorough	3:55
12.	"I Could Have Danced All Night"	A. J. Lerner, F. Loewe	3:24
13.	"Next Year, Baby"	J. Cullum	4:48
14.	"What a Difference a Day Made"	S. Adams, M. Grever	5:08
15.	"Frontin'"	Williams, Hugo; arranged by Jamie Cullum Trio	5:49
Total length:			62:53

== Charts ==
=== Weekly charts ===
Chart (2003–04)	Peak position
Australian Albums (ARIA)	2
Austrian Albums (Ö3 Austria)	30
Belgian Albums (Ultratop Flanders)	14
Belgian Albums (Ultratop Wallonia)	73
Danish Albums (Hitlisten)	37
Dutch Albums (Album Top 100)	3
European Albums (Billboard)	14
Finnish Albums (Suomen virallinen lista)	7
French Albums (SNEP)	57
German Albums (Offizielle Top 100)	57
Italian Albums (FIMI)	35
New Zealand Albums (RMNZ)	2
Norwegian Albums (VG-lista)	5
Portuguese Albums (AFP)	12
Spanish Albums (Promusicae)	55
Swedish Albums (Sverigetopplistan)	17
Swiss Albums (Schweizer Hitparade)	29
UK Albums (Official Charts)	3
UK Jazz & Blues Albums (Official Charts)	1
US Billboard 200	83
US Top Jazz Albums (Billboard)	3

=== Year-end charts ===
Chart (2003)	Position
UK Albums (OCC)	38

Chart (2004)	Position
Australian Albums (ARIA)	66
Belgian Albums (Ultratop Flanders)	63
Dutch Albums (Album Top 100)	18
UK Albums (OCC)	27

Chart (2005)	Position
Dutch Albums (Album Top 100)	17
UK Albums (OCC)	200

== Certifications ==
Sales certifications for Twentysomething
Region	Certification	Certified units/sales
Australia (ARIA)	Platinum	70,000^{^}
Austria (IFPI Austria)	Gold	15,000^{*}
Denmark (IFPI Danmark)	Gold	20,000^{^}
Germany (BVMI)	Gold	100,000^{‡}
Netherlands (NVPI)	2× Platinum	160,000^{^}
New Zealand (RMNZ)	Gold	7,500^{^}
Portugal (AFP)	Gold	20,000^{^}
Switzerland (IFPI Switzerland)	Gold	20,000^{^}
United Kingdom (BPI)	4× Platinum	1,200,000
United States	—	325,000
Summaries
Europe (IFPI)	Platinum	1,000,000^{*}
^{*} Sales figures based on certification alone.^{^} Shipments figures based on certification alone.^{‡} Sales+streaming figures based on certification alone.
