= Heard It All Before (album) =

Studio album by Jamie Cullum Trio
- Released: 3 August 1999
- Genre: Jazz
- Length: 51:04
- Label: Lioness Records

Jamie Cullum Trio chronology
Heard It All Before (1999)	Pointless Nostalgic (2002)

Heard It All Before is the debut album by Jamie Cullum, released when he was without a record deal, and produced with only £480. It was released in 1999 with only 500 copies made.

== Track listing ==
No.	Title	Writer(s)	Length
1.	"Old Devil Moon"	Burton Lane, E.Y. Harburg	4:34
2.	"They Can't Take That Away from Me"	George Gershwin	4:30
3.	"Night and Day"	Cole Porter	4:16
4.	"My One and Only Love"	Guy Wood, Mellin	6:04
5.	"Caravan"	Duke Ellington, Irving Mills, Juan Tizol	6:31
6.	"I've Got You Under My Skin"	Cole Porter	3:36
7.	"Speak Low"	Kurt Weill, Ogden Nash	6:02
8.	"God Bless the Child"	Billie Holiday, Arthur Herzog Jr.	6:36
9.	"Love for Sale"	Cole Porter	4:33
10.	"Sweet Lorraine"	Mitchell Parish	4:22
Total length:			51:04

== Personnel ==
- Jamie Cullum – piano, vocals
- Raph Mizraki – bass
- Julian Jackson – drums
