= Jamie Cullum =

English jazz-pop singer (born 1979)

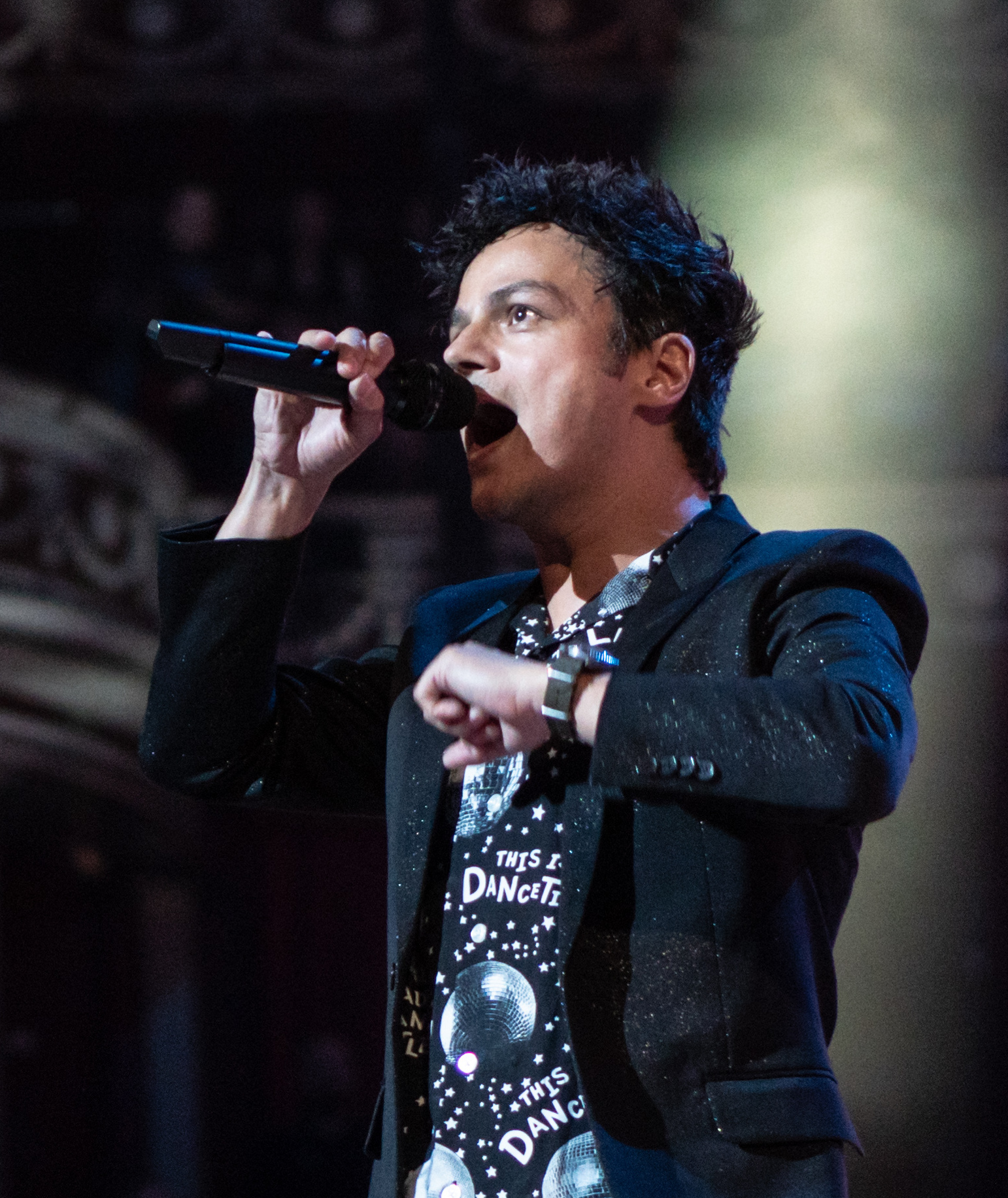
- Cullum performing at The Queen's Birthday Party in 2018

Background information
- Born: Jamie Paul Joseph Cullum; 20 August 1979 (age 47); Rochford, Essex, England
- Genres: Vocal jazz; jazz-pop; swing
- Occupations: Singer; songwriter; radio presenter
- Instruments: Vocals; piano; guitar; drums
- Works: Jamie Cullum discography
- Years active: 1999–present
- Labels: Lioness; UCJ; Candid; Decca; Verve Forecast; Deckdisc
- Spouse: Sophie Dahl (m. 2010)
- Website: jamiecullum.com

Jamie Paul Joseph Cullum (born 20 August 1979) is an English jazz-pop singer, pianist, songwriter and radio presenter. Although primarily a vocalist and pianist, he also accompanies himself on other instruments, including guitar and drums. He has recorded nine studio albums, three compilation albums, one live album and twenty-four singles. Since April 2010, he has presented a weekly Tuesday evening jazz show on BBC Radio 2.

== Early life ==
Cullum's Jewish father, whose own mother had fled Nazi Germany, was born in Jerusalem. His mother's father was Indian and her mother was born in Burma. Following the Japanese invasion, the family left Burma and moved to Wales, when his mother was aged five.

Cullum was born in Rochford, Essex, but was brought up Catholic in Hullavington, Wiltshire. He failed his grade 4 piano exam, and by his own admission can barely read music. At 15, after attending Grittleton House School, he went to Sheldon School in Chippenham. He felt that he "was on a pathway" for a place at the University of Oxford; instead, he read English Literature and Film Studies at the University of Reading, from where he graduated with First-Class Honours.

== Career ==
Cullum produced his first album, Heard It All Before, with only £480. It was released in 1999, with only 500 copies made. The success of the album led to an invitation to appear on Geoff Gascoyne's album Songs of the Summer.

After graduating from Reading University, Cullum released his album Pointless Nostalgic (2002), which stirred interest from broadcasters Michael Parkinson and Melvyn Bragg.

Just after Cullum made his first television appearance, on Parkinson, in April 2003, he signed a £1m contract for three albums with Universal, who beat Sony in a bidding war. Cullum's third studio album, Twentysomething, released in October 2003, went platinum and became the No. 1 selling studio album by a jazz artist in the United Kingdom. Cullum ended 2003 as the UK's biggest selling jazz artist of all time.

Although primarily a jazz musician, Cullum performs in a wide range of styles and is generally regarded as a "crossover" artist, with his musical roots firmly based in jazz. Cullum draws his inspiration from many different musicians and listens to an eclectic mix of music including Miles Davis.

A stomp box made from a small wooden block (not to be confused with an effect pedal for guitars) features in Cullum's concerts. The box is used to amplify a musician's tapping foot. Cullum found this in Melbourne, Australia and uses it to enhance upbeat and fast-paced songs such as "Seven Nation Army", originally by The White Stripes, and "Gold Digger", originally by Kanye West. He also often uses a looping machine; this plays a major part in Cullum's versions of "Seven Nation Army" and "Teardrop" by Massive Attack. Cullum also beatboxes at most gigs.

As well as The White Stripes and Kanye West, Cullum has performed work by Massive Attack, Pharrell, Rihanna, Pussycat Dolls, Radiohead, Gnarls Barkley, Elton John, Justin Timberlake, John Legend, Joy Division, Lady Gaga and many others. He has performed with Deltron 3030, Kylie Minogue, Sugababes, will.i.am, Burt Bacharach and The Heritage Orchestra.

Cullum has played at many large music festivals, including Festival International de Jazz de Montréal (in 2006, 2009 and 2015), Montreux Jazz Festival (2004, 2009, 2014, 2016, 2018), Glastonbury (2004, 2009 and 2017), New Orleans Jazz & Heritage Festival (in 2005), Coachella (2005), South by Southwest (2004, 2006), North Sea Jazz Festival, the Hollywood Bowl (performing with the Count Basie Orchestra), the 2006 Playboy Jazz Festival, the 2007 Jakarta International Java Jazz Festival and the 2008, 2023 Monterey Jazz Festival. On 30 April 2006 Cullum played his biggest-ever crowd on Queensday in the Netherlands.

In February 2012, Germany picked Roman Lob with "Standing Still", a composition by Cullum alongside Steve Robson and Wayne Hector, as their entry for the Eurovision Song Contest.

In October 2014 Cullum was part of the 2014 BBC charity single "God Only Knows" for Children in Need. He appeared in the song's video in a hot air balloon, wearing a salmon-coloured Alexander McQueen suit.

In October 2014, Cullum appeared in a comedy sketch with Jimmy Carr and Daisy Lowe, which was made for Channel 4's The Feeling Nuts Comedy Night to raise awareness of testicular cancer.

On 30 April 2016, Cullum played at The White House in Washington, D.C., as part of the International Jazz Day Global Concert.

In January 2017, Cullum appeared as a member of the house band in ITV's The Halcyon.

=== Pointless Nostalgic ===
On this album, Cullum created covers of old classics with new arrangements of Bob Dorough's composition "Devil May Care", Thelonious Monk's "Well You Needn't" and Gershwin's "It Ain't Necessarily So".

The song as recorded by Cullum ("It Ain't Necessarily So") is also used in the film The Anatomy of Hate; A Dialogue to Hope by Mike Ramsdell.

=== Twentysomething ===
Recorded at London's Mayfair Studios and released in 2003, Twentysomething contains a mix of jazz standards, contemporary covers, and ballads. Due to the acoustic nature of the music, producer Stewart Levine chose to record and mix Twentysomething entirely on analogue tape.

The album includes jazz standards "What a Diff'rence a Day Made", "Singin' in the Rain", and Cole Porter's "I Get a Kick out of You", modern takes on My Fair Lady's "I Could Have Danced All Night", Jeff Buckley's "Lover, You Should Have Come Over", and Jimi Hendrix's "The Wind Cries Mary", as well as new tracks written by Cullum and his brother Ben, including the first single from the album All at Sea and the title track "Twentysomething".

=== Catching Tales ===
Catching Tales has been released on double vinyl, as was the first single, "Get Your Way". A limited-edition version of the "Get Your Way" single was released on red vinyl.

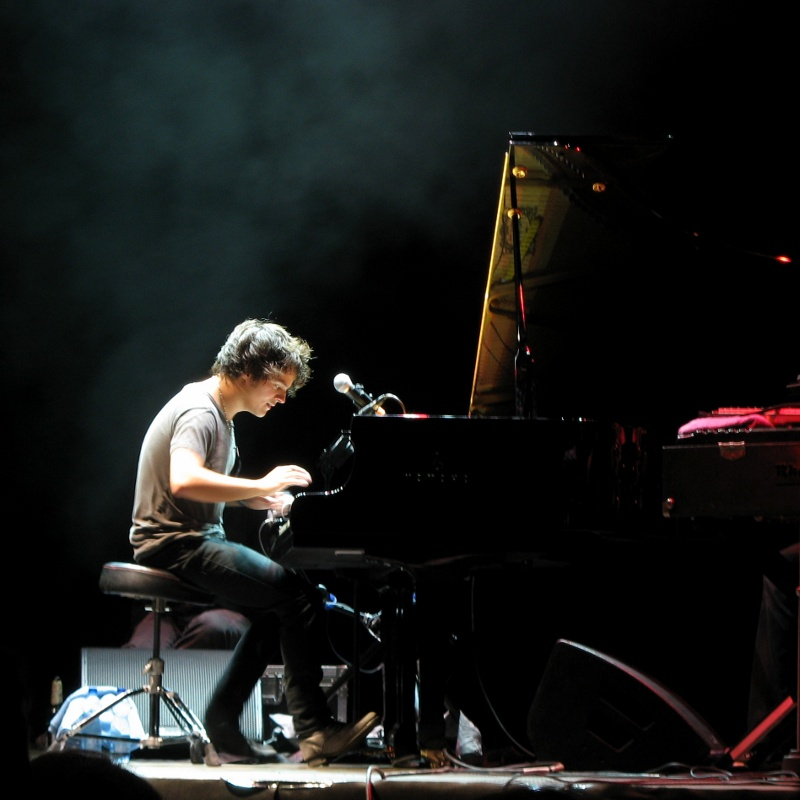
Cullum performing at Colours of Ostrava, July 2009

Cullum toured in support of Catching Tales from the end of October 2005 to December 2006.

=== The Pursuit ===
In June 2009, Cullum announced the title of his fourth studio album, The Pursuit. The album, which was released on 10 November 2009, was produced by Greg Wells, and the first single was "I'm All Over It", written with Deacon Blue frontman, Ricky Ross.

The Pursuit was recorded in a variety of places: Cullum's kitchen, a studio in L.A. and Terrified Studios (his own in Shepherd's Bush, London). Various musicians were used in the recording process. Songs recorded in L.A. mostly used session musicians and saw Wells and Cullum play various instruments including drums and bass. "Don't Stop The Music", the second single from the album (released as a download only in January 2010) was recorded with Chris Hill and Brad Webb. The track "Gran Torino", written in collaboration with Clint Eastwood, was used as the title track of Eastwood's 2008 movie of the same name and was nominated for the 2008 Golden Globe Award for Best Original Song.

From 2003 to 2008, Cullum played consistently with Geoff Gascoyne on bass, and Sebastiaan de Krom on drums. From 2003 until 2004 the trio was joined by Ben Castle on saxophone, John Hoare on trumpet, Barnaby Dickinson on trombone and Malcolm MacFarlane on guitar. Sam Wedgwood (guitarist, bassist and trumpeter) later joined Cullum on tour, for a little over a year. At the end of 2005 Cullum was joined by Tom Richards (saxophonist, occasional guitarist and percussion). Soon after that Sam Wedgwood left to pursue his own solo musical career. At the beginning of 2006 Rory Simmons (trumpeter and guitarist) joined the band as a replacement, bringing the total number of band members (including Cullum himself) to five.

In late 2009, Cullum replaced Geoff Gascoyne (bass) and Sebastiaan de Krom (drums) with Chris Hill (bass) and Brad Webb (drums).

=== Momentum ===
Jamie Cullum's album Momentum was released on 20 May 2013. In conjunction with the album, he performed six intimate gigs across Europe; the first was in London.

In an interview with NBHAP, Cullum said that Momentum is about the crossover period from being a young man while having one foot in the adult world, and about the balance of childish fantasies with grand and epic responsibilities.

=== Interlude ===
Interlude is an album consisting of jazz covers, released on 6 October 2014. Recorded with producer Benedic Lamdin of big band Nostalgia 77, and recorded in one take, the album was influenced by Cullum's BBC Radio 2 weekly jazz show. The duets on the album include two acts for which Cullum's radio show acted as a springboard for mainstream success: Laura Mvula featured on the track "Good Morning Heartache", and Gregory Porter on the lead single "Don't Let Me Be Misunderstood".

Available in standard and deluxe versions, the latter including a DVD of Cullum's full performance at Jazz à Vienne, and an exclusive photo booklet containing tour and studio pictures.

To celebrate the launch of his first pure jazz album, Cullum played at several jazz clubs, including Blue Note Jazz Club in New York, and London's Ronnie Scott's.

=== Taller ===
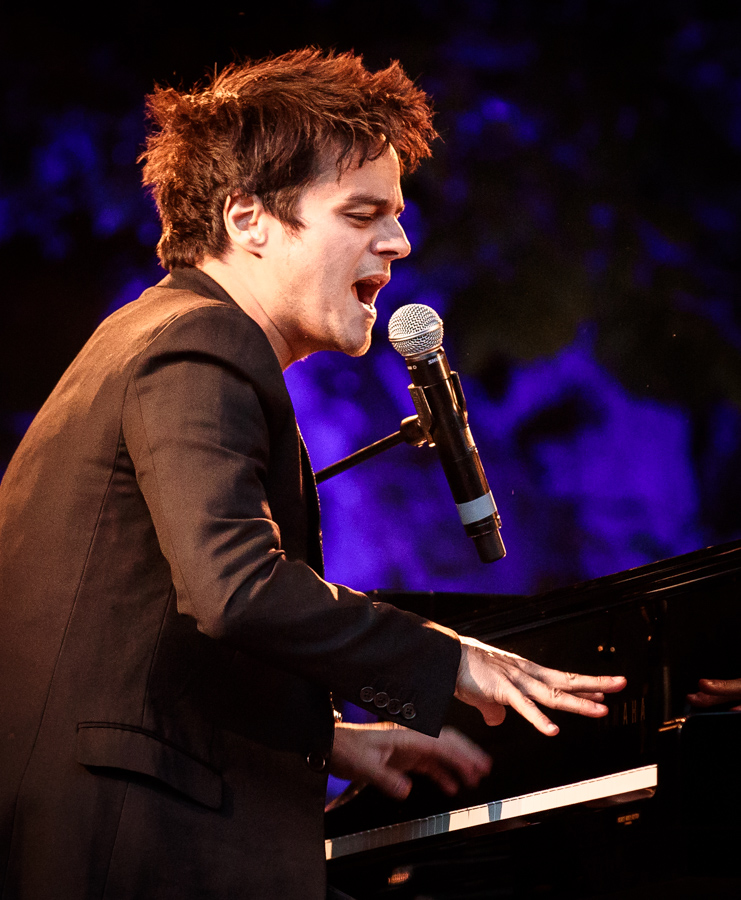
Cullum performing at Akershus Festning, Oslo, in 2017.

In February 2017, Cullum revealed he was working on his next studio album Taller, following the release of its first single "Work of Art" on 17 February.

=== Recent work ===
In July 2020, Cullum released the single "Don't Give Up on Me" on the Island Records label.

== Awards ==
The British Jazz Awards recognised Cullum's growing success by awarding him the "Rising Star" award, at the 2003 ceremony in July. At the 2004 BRIT Awards, Cullum was nominated in the British Breakthrough Act category. He performed a live duet with Katie Melua of The Cure's "The Lovecats" during the ceremony at Earl's Court. At the 2005 BRIT Awards, Cullum was nominated for two awards: Best Male Artist and Best Live Act. In 2005, Cullum was nominated for a Grammy. He was named the BBC Radio 2's Artist of the Year honors at the BBC Jazz Awards (as voted by listeners of Radio 2).

In 2007, Cullum won the Ronnie Scott's Jazz Club Award for Best British Male. He was also nominated for a Golden Globe Award for Best Original Song for his composition Gran Torino for the Clint Eastwood film Gran Torino. At the 2013 Jazz FM awards, Cullum was a nominee for UK Jazz Artist of the Year.

Year	Awards	Work	Category	Result
2003	British Jazz Awards	n/a	Rising Star	Won
2004	Silver Clef Awards	n/a	Best Newcomer	Won
2004	MOBO Awards	n/a	Best Jazz Act	Won
2004	Brit Awards	n/a	British Breakthrough Act	Nominated
2005	Brit Awards	n/a	British Male Solo Artist	Nominated
2005	Brit Awards	n/a	British Live Act	Nominated
2005	BBC Jazz Awards	n/a	Artist of the Year	Won
2005	Naomi Awards	n/a	Worst British Male	Won
2005	Grammy Awards	Twentysomething	Best Jazz Vocal Album	Nominated
2006	ECHO Awards	n/a	Best Jazz Act	Nominated
2006	Meteor Music Awards	n/a	Best International Male	Nominated
2007	Ronnie Scott's Jazz Awards	n/a	Best British Male	Won
2008	St. Louis Film Critics Association	Gran Torino	Best Music	Nominated
2009	Golden Globe Awards	"Gran Torino"	Best Original Song	Nominated
2009	World Soundtrack Awards	"Gran Torino"	Best Original Song	Nominated
2012	New York Festival Radio Awards	Jamie Cullum's BBC Radio Show	Best Jazz Format	Won
2012	Parliamentary Jazz Awards	n/a	Jazz Broadcaster of the Year	Won
2013	Jazz FM Awards	n/a	UK Jazz Artist of the Year	Won
2014	Radio Academy Awards	Jamie Cullum's BBC Radio Show	Best Music Programme	Won

== Projects ==
Cullum's early music career saw him playing three or four times a week at PizzaExpress's restaurants throughout London, gaining exposure and later his big break with Universal. In 2011 the "Pizza Express Big Audition with Jamie Cullum" competition gave singers, songwriters and musicians a platform and a chance to win a £5,000 prize and a residency at the restaurant chain's Dean Street Jazz Club. 7,500 acts entered the competition and the final, held at the Addison's Rooms in Kensington on 23 November, was judged by Cullum, Michael Parkinson, M People's Heather Small and other music critics. The winning act was Offbeat South, an urban group of 18- to 21-year-olds from Croydon.

In 2021, alongside Sophie Ellis-Bextor and The Feeling, Cullum re-recorded the classic 1977 Fleetwood Mac song "Don't Stop" as part of the UK's National Thank You Day on 4 July, to celebrate the work of the National Health Service. The single was released on 25 June.

In 2022, Cullum was among the artists who celebrated 60 years of music from James Bond films in a concert at the Royal Albert Hall.

== Personal life ==
Cullum married the English author and former model Sophie Dahl in a private ceremony in Hampshire on 9 January 2010. The couple first met at a charity concert where she performed a song. Their daughter was born in 2011 and their second daughter was born in 2013.

In 2011, a portrait of Cullum, painted by artist Joe Simpson, was exhibited around the UK, including a solo exhibition at the Royal Albert Hall.

Cullum was the guest for BBC Radio 4's Desert Island Discs on 25 March 2012, where he created programme history by performing three of his chosen songs, live in the studio for the show. His disc choices included The Lamb by John Tavener, and "Concerning the UFO Sighting near Highland Illinois" by Sufjan Stevens. His favourite was "I Think It's Going to Rain Today" by Randy Newman.

Cullum is a fan of Swindon Town.

== Discography ==
- Heard It All Before (1999)
- Pointless Nostalgic (2002)
- Twentysomething (2003)
- Catching Tales (2005)
- The Pursuit (2009)
- Momentum (2013)
- Interlude (2014)
- Taller (2019)
- The Pianoman at Christmas (2020)
