= Vile Imbeciles =

English rock band

- Origin: Brighton, England
- Genres: Noise rock; experimental rock; alternative rock; funk; free jazz
- Years active: 2005–2014 (hiatus)
- Labels: White Heat, Tea Vee Eye, Cargo
- Members: Andy Huxley; Deen Lim; Evan Reinhold
- Past members: Caspian Rospigliosi; Liam Dowling; James Hair; Rob "Bertie" Lean
- Website: vileimbeciles.com

Vile Imbeciles (or VI) are an English rock band from Brighton formed in 2005 consisting of ex-The Eighties Matchbox B-Line Disaster guitarist Andy Huxley on guitar and vocals, Evan Reinhold on drums and Deen Lim on bass guitar and vocals.

The band's work to date comprises four studio albums, all released on independent record labels.

== Inception and ...Ma ==
The band was formed in 2005 following Huxley's departure from The Eighties Matchbox B-Line Disaster. The original line-up was Huxley, James Hair ("lead bassist", formerly of Neils Children), and Rob "Bertie" Lean (drums and vocals). The debut album ...Ma, was released on 4 June 2007 on White Heat Records, and was shortly followed by the single "Slack Hands" on 18 June 2007. The album title was a dedication to longtime friend and supporter Dave Ma, who directed the video to "Slack Hands". The album was recorded by Huxley in his bedroom in Hove and received some attention from the press, being reviewed in both NME and Kerrang! amongst others, the former giving it 2 out of 10 and the latter 4 out of 5. Owing to the album's harsh sound the band received a mixed reception from previous fans of Huxley.

== Queenie Was a Blonde / Death Jazz ==
Released under the name Queenie Was a Blonde on 14 July 2008 on Tea Vee Eye Records, the band's second album included the addition of Caspian Rospigliosi on guitar. The album title was taken from the opening line of the Joseph Moncure March poem The Wild Party. The first single from the album "Bad Ideas" was released on 18 August 2008, the promotional video being shot on the same day that Lean quit the group. The band went on to promote the album with new drummer Evan Reinhold, who had previously collaborated with Huxley in bohemian cabaret band The Dirty Cakes (featured on the BBC Three Reality TV Show Singing with the Enemy).

The band completed their thirty-minute one song mini-concept-album Death Jazz in late 2008; the recording features Reinhold and Lean drumming alongside each other on the work. The band's self-styled death jazz genre and concept album had been a running joke continuously referred to in interviews since the band's inception. The Guardian subsequently released an article referring to death jazz as a new musical genre, only briefly mentioning the band. Huxley has since commented on the concept album, "The idea was that it would be a sort of homage to Ornette Coleman's album Free Jazz. It was meant to be a sort of metal-jazz backwards thing. We recorded it anyway, but Death Jazz is probably not the best term for it: it's more free post-rock or something like that." On 16 March 2009, the band released the mini album as a B-side to the double A-side single "Jennifer"/"Tramp", both A-side tracks being taken from the Queenie Was a Blonde album. The album was reviewed by the NME who noted "Brighton four-piece Vile Imbeciles show scant regard for the traditions of the recorded format" in their decision to release an album as a B-side to a single and gave the album 8 out of 10 stating the work was "the manifestation of a magnificent perversion". The videos to both A-side singles were shot on location in the disused bank Reinhold was living in.

== D Is for W ==
In October 2009, shortly after the band had begun recording their fourth studio album, Hair announced his retirement from music to launch his new company Mr Hair's Pie Factory. Early 2010 saw the band's return to live performances playing completely new material as a five-piece with the addition of Deen Lim on bass and Liam Dowling on synths, with all five members of the group sharing vocals. Throughout 2010 and 2011, the already largely recorded album found itself in a constant state of editing and re-recording, with the band using a total of four producers. The album was finally released on 3 October 2011 as a joint production by Cameron Devlin & former Pink Grease songwriter Steven Santa Cruz, and was named "D Is for W" after a complaint "D.. No, D. D as in W... No, D. D for W... D is for W" Huxley overheard and "completely understood" whilst working in the complaints department of an Insurance company. The album was described by Huxley as both born of a "severe inner struggle" and "positive and perfect". The album received positive reviews with Uncut describing it as a "Hyper-intense and malevolent, brilliantly well-crafted, math-funk/death jazz hybrid that suggests a cerebral aneurysm reaching critical point" and MOJO calling it "pop that simultaneously grates, intrigues and beguiles".

== Return to a three piece and unannounced hiatus ==
Throughout 2012, VI again underwent major line-up changes. Keyboardist/guitarist Liam Dowling's departure from the group was announced via the band's website in March, and following a short French tour as a four piece the band ceased playing live. In the autumn Huxley returned to touring with The Eighties Matchbox B-Line Disaster and an announcement on the VI Facebook stated that guitarist/vocalist Caspian Rospigliosi had left the band and that Huxley, Reinhold and Lim were continuing as a three piece.

After a tour showcasing new material in 2013 the band returned to the studio to work on their fifth album. Although no announcement was made, the band went on indefinite hiatus without releasing the material.

== Discography ==
=== Albums ===
Date of release	Album	Members
4 June 2007	...Ma	Hair, Huxley, Lean
14 July 2008	Queenie Was a Blonde	Hair, Huxley, Lean, Rospigliosi
16 March 2009	Death Jazz	Hair, Huxley, Lean, Reinhold, Rospigliosi
3 October 2011	D Is for W	Dowling, Huxley, Lim, Reinhold, Rospigliosi

=== Singles ===
Date of release	Title	Album
18 June 2007	"Slack Hands"	...Ma
18 August 2008	"Bad Ideas"	Queenie Was a Blonde
16 March 2009	"Jennifer" / "Tramp"	Queenie Was a Blonde

=== Videos ===
- The video for debut song "Slack Hands" was shot by Dave Ma in one take on a single roll of super 8 film in Brighton.
- The video for the first single from Queenie Was A Blondie, "Bad Ideas" was released on 9 July. The video was made by Chris Moore.
- The video for "Jennifer" was released on 12 January 2009. The video was made by Jack Dixon and Millie Harvey.
- The video for "Tramp" was released on 19 January 2009. The video was made by The Softbox.
