= Horst Weidenmüller =

German music executive (1964–2025)

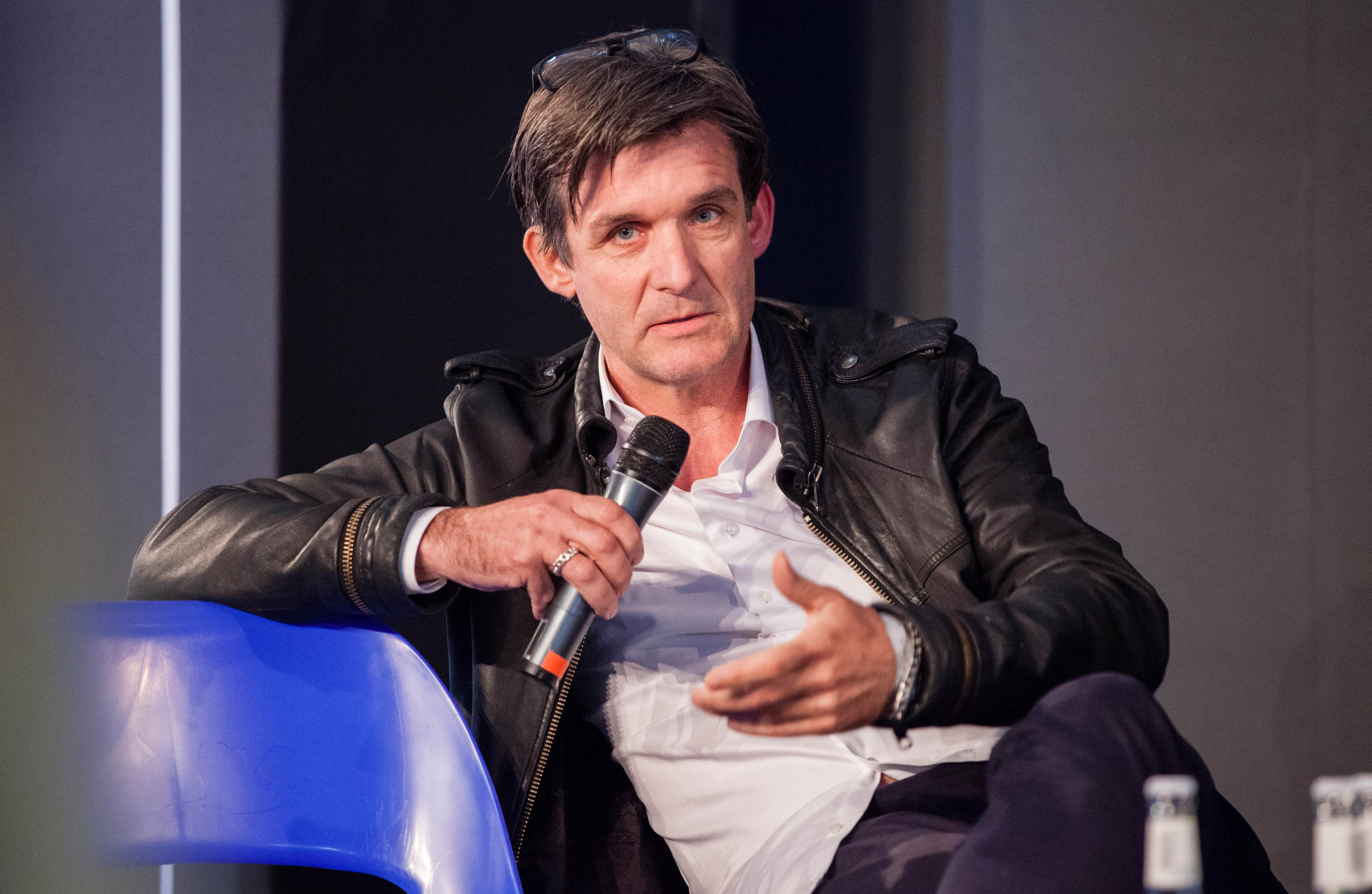
- Horst Weidenmüller at re:publica in 2016
- Born: 1964; Black Forest, Baden-Württemberg, West Germany
- Died: 10 February 2025 (aged 60-61)
- Occupations: Music executive producer; Entrepreneur
- Known for: Founder of !K7 Music
- Board member of: IMPALA, Merlin Network

Horst Weidenmüller (1964 – 10 February 2025) was a German music executive producer, entrepreneur, and the founder of !K7 Music. He joined the music industry in the early 1980s as a producer of concert video footage of musicians in the punk music genre. He founded !K7 in 1985 and became an influential part of the Berlin techno music industry in the early 1990s. Weidenmüller curated and produced a popular techno music audiovisual series, X-Mix, which aired on MTV in the mid-1990s. He also served on the board of several trade associations, including the IMPALA where he was co-president until 2011. Since its founding in 2008, he also served on the board of the digital rights agency Merlin Network.

== Background ==
Weidenmüller was born in the Black Forest region of West Germany in 1964. He moved to Berlin in 1982.

Weidenmüller died after a serious illness on 10 February 2025, at the age of 60.

== Career ==
Weidenmüller founded Studio !K7 (now known as !K7 Music) in 1985 in Berlin at the age of 21. It was located at Kaiserdamm 7, an address that became the inspiration for the company's name. Initially, Weidenmüller focused on creating concert videos for punk bands which were shown in cafes, such as Café Swing in Berlin, before the advent of music videos on television. He produced live video footage of concerts by Nick Cave, Einstürzende Neubauten, Crime & the City Solution, and Lydia Lunch.

Weidenmüller became an influential part of the Berlin techno music industry in the early 1990s. In 1993, he released his first X-Mix video cassette. These remix videos combined DJ mixes with computer animation for at-home viewing. In the mid-1990s, X-Mix videos, including those of Laurent Garnier or Richie Hawtin, were aired at night on MTV. X-Mix became a platform by which artists working in computer graphics could showcase their nascent art form. As Germany was reunified, techno had become popular in both East and West Germany and, according to the German magazine Der Spiegel, "X-Mix gave techno a face", bringing it out of the dark basement venues where it initiated. Weidenmüller also started DJ-Kicks, a DJ mix series first released in 1993, which released its 72nd edition in August 2020.

In 2008, Weidenmüller acquired Strut Records and relaunched the label under the !K7. In the early 2010s, he started an artists management division and signed on to manage the rapper Tricky. Tricky wrote in his biography, Hell Is Around The Corner (2019), how Weidenmüller helped him rectify his finances and build a new catalogue of music for which he retained the rights. !K7 Management also began representing Mykki Blanco, DJ Tennis, Brandt Brauer Frick, Marquis Hawkes, and Portable.

In 2017, Weidenmueller created a classical music label 7K!, and signed several composers and musicians from the neoclassical genre, including Luca D'Alberto, Niklas Paschburg and Henrik Schwarz. Weidenmueller was the Executive Producer on Endless, D'Alberto's 2017 album. He was also Creative Director on Paschburg's 2018 album, Oceanic. In 2019, Weidenmüller created Ever Records, a jazz label, and signed musicians such as the Kansas Smitty's House Band.

Over the years of !K7, Weidenmüller also worked with the artists Kruder & Dorfmeister, Matthew Herbert, Fat Freddy's Drop, Peggy Gou, The Whitest Boy Alive, Forest Swords, Moodymann, Henrik Schwarz, Carl Craig, Einstürzende Neubauten, Grandmaster Flash, Hercules & Love Affair and Madlib. His label group, !K7 Music, includes !K7 Records, Strut Records, AUS, 7K! and Ever Records.

In December 2024, The Independent Music Companies Association, IMPALA dedicated its outstanding contribution award to Horst Weidenmüller for his outstanding contribution to the European independent music sector as CEO and founder of !K7 Music as well as founder of IMPALA’s Sustainability task force.

== Associations ==
Weidenmüller served on the board of several associations representing independent artists and record labels. He has served on the board of directors of the IMPALA since 2003. He joined the executive team at IMPALA in 2006 and served as co-president until 2011. Since its founding in 2008, Weidenmüller was also on the board of Merlin Network, the largest organization representing independent digital rights holders.

== Discography ==
- 2017 – Luca D'Alberto – Endless
- 2018 – Niklas Paschburg – Oceanic
- 2018 – Henrik Schwarz – Scripted Orkestra
- 2018 – Luca D'Alberto – Exile
- 2019 – Henrik Schwarz & Alma Quartet – Plunderphonia
