= Pascal Bittard =

French music industry executive

- Born: October 24, 1968 (age 58); Toulouse, France
- Education: Toulouse Business School (ESC Toulouse)
- Occupations: Music executive, entrepreneur
- Years active: 1994–present
- Known for: Founder and President of IDOL

Pascal Bittard (born October 24, 1968) is a French music industry executive and entrepreneur. He is the founder and president of IDOL, an independent digital music distribution company. Bittard took part in the development of digital music distribution and has been an advocate for user-centric streaming models.

He is also a board member of music industry organizations, including Merlin and the Union of Independent French Phonographic Producers (UPFI).

== Early life and education ==
Pascal Bittard was born in Toulouse, France, on October 24, 1968. He graduated in 1991 from ESC Toulouse (now Toulouse Business School) with a degree in business.

== Career ==
=== Early career ===
From 1994 to 2000, Bittard worked at Sony Music, where he served as Director of Independent Labels Distribution. He then joined V2 Music France as Marketing and Digital Director from 2000 to 2005, where he developed the digital music market in France. During his tenure, he negotiated the company's first digital distribution agreements with platforms such as iTunes, FnacMusic, VirginMega, and several mobile operators.

=== IDOL ===
In 2006, Bittard founded IDOL (Independent Distribution On Line), leveraging his experience at V2 Music to build a new model for digital music distribution. Under his leadership, IDOL became a major independent digital music distributor. Bittard oversaw IDOL's international expansion, opening offices in London (2014), United States (2016), South Africa (2017), Germany (2020). He was recognized as a thought leader in the industry, particularly for his support of user-centric payment models in music streaming—an alternative to the traditional pro-rata system.

Since 2010, he has served on the board of UPFI, and since 2022, he is a board member of Merlin, the digital music licensing agency for the world's independent music sector. He was re-elected to this role in 2024.

In 2018, Bittard was named a Knight of the Order of Arts and Letters (Chevalier de l'Ordre des Arts et des Lettres) by the French Ministry of Culture for his contributions to the music industry.

In both 2023 and 2024, he was recognized in Billboard's "100 International Power Players", honoring his influence on the global music business.
