= Merlin Network =

Digital rights music licensing partner

- Company type: Non-profit
- Traded as: Merlin Network
- Industry: Music distribution
- Founded: 2007
- Headquarters: London
- Area served: Worldwide
- Key people: Darius Van Arman, Chairperson; Charlie Lexton, Chief Executive
- Services: Digital music licensing
- Members: Principal member labels: Armada Music; Because Music/London Music Stream; Beggars Group; Better Noise Music; Cinq Music Group; Curb Records; Domino Recording Company; Entertainment One Music; Epitaph Records; Fluxus; Hopeless Records; !K7; Mad Decent; Merge Records; Mom+Pop; Mushroom Group; Naxos Records; Ninja Tune; PIAS Group; Polyvinyl Record Co.; Pony Canyon; Red Bull Records; Redeye Distribution; Secretly Group; Secret City Records; Stones Throw Records; Sub Pop; Symphonic Distribution; WARP Records
- Website: merlinnetwork.org

Merlin is a digital rights music licensing partner for independent record labels, distributors, and other music rights holders around the world. It was founded in 2007 with Charles Caldas as the chief executive. In January 2026, Charlie Lexton, who joined Merlin at its inception, stepped into the role of Merlin CEO. The company is a member-based organization representing the digital licensing rights for hundreds of independent labels and distributors in nearly every country around the globe and represents 15% of the global music market share. As of 2019, Merlin has paid out over two billion dollars.

== History ==
Merlin was launched in early 2007 at the Marché International du Disque et de l'Edition Musicale in Cannes. The company was founded by Alison Wenham (WIN), Michel Lambot (PIAS), Tom Silverman (Tommy Boy) and Martin Mills (Beggars Group); Charles Caldas was the first chief executive. The organization's first commercial deal was a 2008 license with Spotify as one of the then-regional streaming service's original licensing partners.

The company has negotiated settlements for copyright infringement with distributors such as Grooveshark, Limewire and XM Satellite Radio. Its content has been distributed through TikTok, Facebook/Instagram, Deezer, Pandora Music, SoundCloud, Spotify, Vevo, YouTube Premium and other services.

In February 2013, Merlin and IMPALA signed an agreement with Warner Music Group after it acquired Parlophone, to transfer 30% of that label's value to Merlin and IMPALA members. The divestment ended with the transfer of rights to the independent sector.

In 2016, Merlin opened an office in Tokyo, Japan, to expand its global operations.

In March 2018 the company entered into agreements with the three Chinese streaming services – NetEase, Alibaba, and Tencent – for digital music distribution in China. In May 2018, the company sold all of its Spotify shares for an estimated $125 million-plus, passing the proceeds on to its members. A landmark global licensing deal in December 2019 saw Merlin partnering with Boomplay Music.

In 2020, Jeremy Sirota joined Merlin as its second CEO. The organization expanded its deals to include Apple, Snap, and Triller.

In January 2021, Merlin held a "Celebrate Music" event. At the event, it unveiled a new brand, a new logo, and an updated website.

In August 2021, Feed Media Group, the B2B music licensing subscription service, signed a music licensing deal with Merlin, for its Adaptr product. Adaptr is a subscription-based platform. The deal provides access to a catalog of licensed music from Merlin member labels, distributors, and their artists.

In September 2021, Merlin and South Asian music and audio streaming service JioSaavn announced that they had extended and enhanced an existing music licensing partnership. The expanded partnership enabled Merlin's membership to increase their presence in South Asia and expanded JioSaavn's catalog offering to its worldwide audience.

Merlin added to its list of partners in October 2021 when it announced a deal with TREBEL, the maker of a licensed music app with on-demand and offline play sponsored by brand advertisers. The company ended the year by announcing an expanded licensing agreement with African music streaming service Boomplay.

In January 2022, Merlin partnered with UK-based Lickd to allow creators to legally use Merlin members' music in their YouTube videos.

Next, in early February 2022, Merlin announced a partnership with Twitch, the interactive live streaming service for content spanning gaming, entertainment, sports, music, and more.

April 2022 saw the company announce a deal with FLO, a leading streaming application in Korea.

In October 2022, Pinterest announced a deal to brin g Merlin members' musical repertoire to its platform. That month also saw a partnership announced with China-based short-form video platform Kuaishou.

Merlin announced two new partnerships in December 2022: first with VR fitness app Supernatural and then with STYNGR, a gaming music platform.

In May 2023, Merlin unveiled a global licensing deal with SoundCloud. In late June, the company announced a partnership with all-in-one visual communication platform Canva to grant Canva customers in many countries access to use music clips in their designs.

March 2024 saw a renewed partnership with Deezer. The following month, Merlin announced a partnership with Audiomack.

In early June 2024, the organization announced the launch of Merlin Connect, a solution for emerging technology platforms to license fully cleared, quality independent music handpicked by Merlin members. Later that month, Merlin renewed its strategic partnership with Meta in a deal that covers Meta properties including Instagram, Facebook, and Messenger.

The Merlin Engage mentorship program launched in 2023. With its recently announced third year in 2025, it is a program catered to a diverse and unique Merlin membership. It pairs executive-level mentors with talented mentees to help shape the next generation of female leaders in the independent music space. The program crosses borders, cultures, and music genres to build community, inspire confidence, and offer support and workshops in building soft skills, such as managing up, powerful storytelling and handling adversity.

In August 2025, Merlin entered into a commercial licensing partnership with ElevenLabs, a leading AI audio research and product company. Under the agreement, Merlin licensed the training and commercialization of ElevenLabs’ music AI models trained on Merlin members’ content. The deal was noted for the “responsible guardrails” it established to ensure that artists’ rights and contributions are respected and fairly compensated.

== Structure ==
=== Executives ===
As of January 2025, Merlin's executive team is:

- Charlie Lexton, CEO
- Adam Wright, CFO
- Kaoruko Hill, GM APAC
- Jim Mahoney, SVP, Member & Partner Success

=== Board members ===
The current Board was elected in 2024 and is composed of:

- Pascal Bittard, Owner, IDOL
- Golda Bitterli, VP of Sales, Revelator
- Jeffrey Chiang, Director of Global Business, Fluxus
- Marie Clausen, Managing Director North America, Ninja Tune
- Tom Deakin, Head of EMEA, AudioSalad
- Eniko Gallasz, Managing Director, WM Music Distribution
- Fer Isella, Founder and CEO, limbo music
- Megan Jasper, CEO, Sub Pop
- Chris Maund, Co-CEO, Mushroom Music
- Carlos Mills, Founder & CEO, Mills Records
- Louis Posen, President & Executive Director, Hopeless Records
- Michael Ugwu, CEO, Freeme Digital
- Darius Van Arman, Co-CEO of Secretly Group (Reappointed as Chairperson of Merlin's Board for 2024)
- Horst Weidenmüller, CEO & Owner, !K7
- Justin West, President & CEO, Secret City
- Simon Wheeler, Director of Global Commercial Strategy, Beggars

=== Advisory board members ===
- Jennifer Newman Sharpe, General Counsel, Exceleration
