= Beggars Banquet Records =

British independent record label

- Parent company: Beggars Group
- Founded: 1973
- Founder: Martin Mills, Nick Austin
- Distributor: Beggars Group
- Genre: Punk rock; new wave; alternative rock
- Country of origin: United Kingdom
- Location: Wandsworth, London
- Official website: beggars.com

Beggars Banquet Records is a British independent record label. Beggars Banquet started as a chain of record shops owned by Martin Mills and Nick Austin and is part of the Beggars Group of labels.

== History ==
In 1977, spurred by the prevailing DIY aesthetics of the British punk rock movement (then at the height of its popularity), Martin Mills and Nick Austin founded a record label to release records under the Beggars Banquet imprint. The first band on the label was the English punk group the Lurkers; the first release on the label was the Lurkers' 7" single "Shadow"/"Love Story". They also released the first solo "Duffo" album from Australian big-band vocalist Jeff Duff. Later in the decade and into the early 1980s, hits with Tubeway Army and Gary Numan secured the label's future. Other bands who were signed to the label include the Associates, Bauhaus, the Cult, Biffy Clyro, Flesh for Lulu, Gene Loves Jezebel, the Icicle Works and the Go-Betweens.

== See also ==
- List of record labels
- List of independent UK record labels
- Beggars Group
