= Susan Athey =

American economist

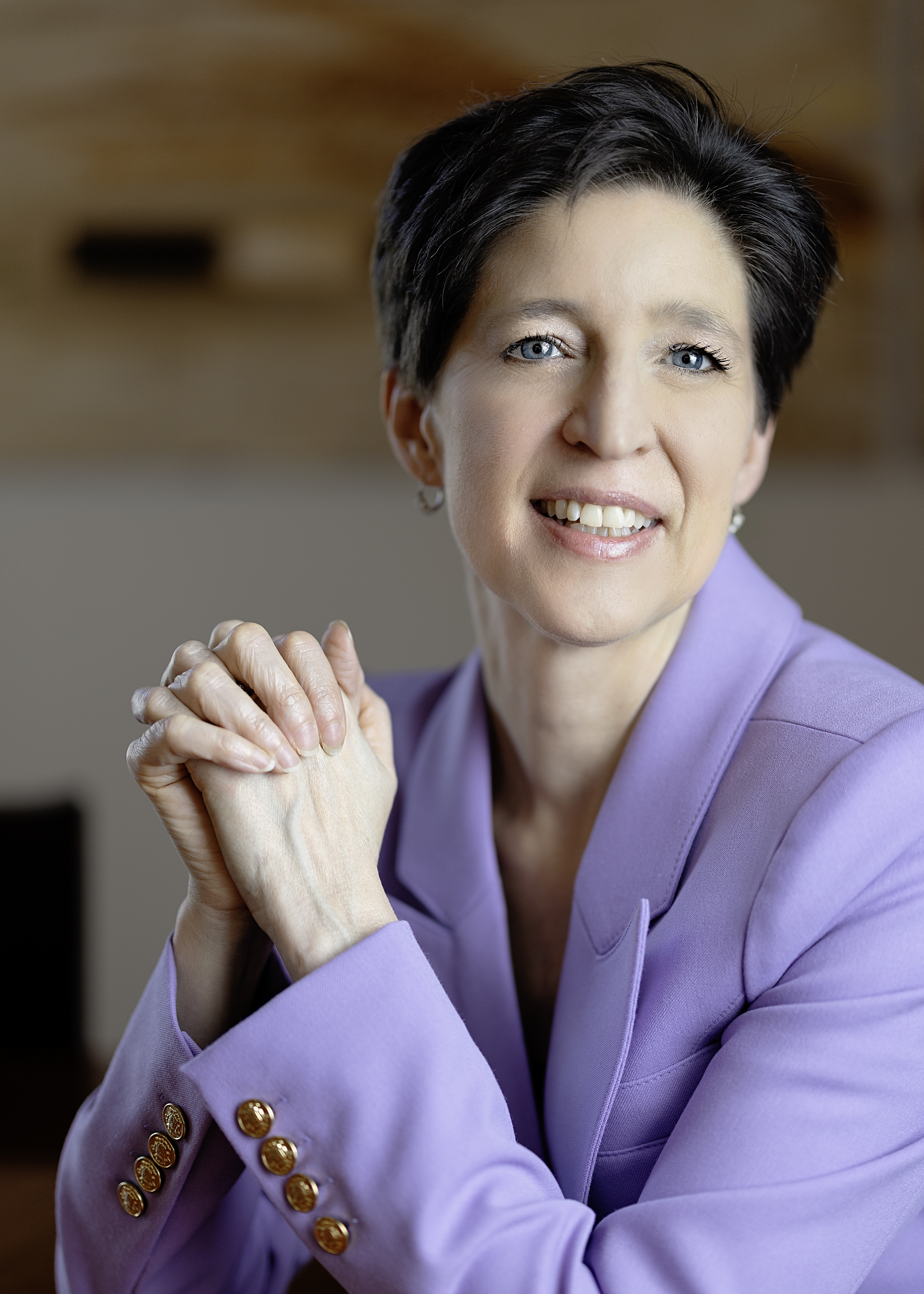
- Professor Susan Athey in 2025
- Born: November 29, 1970 (age 55); Boston, Massachusetts, U.S.
- Spouse: Guido Imbens

Academic background
- Education: Duke University (BA); Stanford University (PhD)
- Doctoral advisor: Paul Milgrom; Donald John Roberts; Edward Lazear

Academic work
- Discipline: Microeconomics; Econometrics; Machine Learning
- Institutions: Stanford University
- Awards: John Bates Clark Medal (2007)
- Website: Information at IDEAS / RePEc

Susan Carleton Athey (born November 29, 1970) is an American economist. She is the Economics of Technology Professor in the School of Humanities and Sciences at the Stanford Graduate School of Business. Prior to joining Stanford, she has been a professor at Harvard University and the Massachusetts Institute of Technology.

Athey is the first female winner of the John Bates Clark Medal. She served as the consulting chief economist for Microsoft for six years and was a consulting researcher to Microsoft Research. She is currently on the boards of Expedia, Lending Club, Rover, Turo, Ripple, and non-profit Innovations for Poverty Action, and is a Scientific Advisor at Haus, a marketing science company. She also serves as the senior fellow at Stanford Institute for Economic Policy Research. She is an associate director for the Stanford Institute for Human-Centered Artificial Intelligence and the director of Golub Capital Social Impact Lab.

== Early life and education ==
Athey was born in Boston, Massachusetts, and grew up in Rockville, Maryland. Her parents are Elizabeth Johansen, an English teacher and freelance editor, and Whit Athey, a physics scholar.

Athey attended Duke University for her undergraduate coursework. There, she completed three majors (economics, mathematics, and computer science) and graduated in 1991. Athey's interest in economics research can be attributed to a summer job where she prepared bids for a company that was selling personal computers to the government through procurement auctions. Working on problems related to auctions with Bob Marshall, a professor at Duke University who worked on defense procurement, she became his research assistant and subsequently inherited his passion for auction research. She was additionally involved in a number of leadership roles at Duke, including serving as treasurer of Chi Omega sorority and as president of the field hockey club.

Athey graduated with a Ph.D. in economics from the Stanford Graduate School of Business in 1995. Her dissertation was supervised by Paul Milgrom and Donald John Roberts. Athey also received an honorary doctorate from Duke University.

Athey has been married to economist Guido Imbens since 2002.

== Career ==
=== Academic career ===
Athey's first position was as an assistant professor at the Massachusetts Institute of Technology, where she taught for six years, before returning to Stanford's Department of Economics as professor, where she held the Holbrook Working Chair for another five years. Then, she served as a professor of economics at Harvard University until 2012, before finally returning to the Stanford Graduate School of Business, her alma mater and current employer.

In July 2022, Athey joined the Antitrust Division of the United States Department of Justice as its chief economist, taking partial leave from Stanford.

=== Applied auction research ===
Auctions were the reason Athey went into economics. She has contributed on all dimensions to research on auctions. Athey's theoretical work on collusion in repeated games has been applied to auctions. She has performed significant empirical work in econometrics of auctions. In fact, her existence theorem for sets with private information has done an innovative job on the econometrics of auctions.

She also oversaw work that has had significant effects on business and public policy. Athey and Jonathan Levin examined the U.S. Forest Service's oral ascending auctions for the rights to cut timber in the national forests. Typically, a given tract contains several different species of timber-yielding trees. The Forest Service publishes an estimate of the proportions of the various species based on an inspection. Potential bidders then can conduct their inspections. Bids are multidimensional: amounts to be paid per unit for each species. The winner is determined by aggregating each bidder's offer using the Forest Service's estimated proportions. The actual amount the winner pays, however, is computed by applying the bid vector to the exact amounts that are ultimately harvested (the winner has two years to complete the harvest). These rules create an incentive for a bidder whose estimate of the proportions differs from that of the Forest Service to skew its bidding, which raises the bid for species that the bidder believes are less common than does the Forest Service. Conversely, it lowers the bid for the species that the bidder believes are more common than does the Forest Service. For example, suppose there are two species and the Forest Service estimates that they are in equal proportions, but a bidder believes they are in dimensions 3:2. Then bids of ($100, $100) and ($50, $150) yield the same amount under the Forest Service proportions and so are equally likely to win, but the bidder's expected payments under the first and under the second differ.

One of Athey's best-known works that deals with auctions is called "Comparing Open and Sealed Bid Auctions: Theory and Evidence from Timber Auctions." In this paper, Athey works with Johnathan Levin and Enrique Seira. She and her peers were interested in testing to see if the participation effects on auction were important. There are two types of auctions, open and sealed-bid auctions. Open auctions are where bidders are constantly outbidding one another until the last bidder gives up and the auction ends, and sealed-bid auctions are when individuals write down their bids and submit them, whoever has the highest bid wins. The data that they used came from the United States Forest Service auctions. Their results indicated that participation type matters. It even matters more than what is actually taking place during the auctioning process.

=== Digital marketplace research ===
Athey's contributions to technology and the digital marketplace are focused on their social impact. Pioneering the field alongside Google's Hal Varian, Athey was one of the first coined "tech economists." She cites this to be one of her proudest lifetime accomplishments.

Athey is able to hone her skills from different fields to create an amalgamation of machine learning and market design which is leveraged to make sense of and improve the social impact of technology. In some of her more recent research, Athey applies these techniques to the COVID-19 pandemic. By analyzing the effectiveness of social media advertising in influencing the beliefs surrounding COVID-19 vaccine efficacy, Athey was able to conclude that the average cost of influencing a person in favor of the vaccine was $3.41. This, coupled with an estimated vaccine cost of $5.68, provided empirical evidence for the cost-effectiveness of using social media campaigns to influence the vaccination rate.

Her passion for using machine learning to advance the alleviation of societal issues led her to become the faculty director of the Stanford Business School's Initiative for Shared Prosperity and Innovation (ISPI). This project utilizes technology to address social problems like poverty, inequality, and, as aforementioned, COVID-19. The Initiative's mechanism for doing this is to apply machine learning methods to technology companies with the eventual result of improving methods for measuring impact. As technology companies rapidly and incrementally improve using data collection methods, it is increasingly important that they do this more efficiently by being more accurate in their impact measurements. When companies implement these machine learning tactics, they become more efficient; this is particularly important because they are legitimized to potential investors, which helps secure funding. This is particularly important in the case of social impact projects, which oftentimes rely on volatile forms of investment like philanthropic or governmental funding. Athey further bridged the gap between digital learning and economics by founding The Golbub Capital Social Impact Lab at Stanford university in 2019. The Golub club consists of other Stanford faculty, graduate students and researchers who specialize in economics and other related fields such as business and computer science. The Glob club uses AI, Machine learning and digital adaptive learning to help many organizations improve programs in areas like education health, and government. The Golob experiments with generative AI with a purpose to bring AI and modern technology to give insight for economic purposes, understanding behavior and policy designs to better assist company effectiveness and efficiency. The club does this by applying a "tech-firm toolkit" that takes the subject and their current algorithms and uses AI and adaptive learning to test, refine and scale interventions in real time. This simply means that they can help companies with large economic decisions and overall bring modern technology to the economic sector. https://www.gsb.stanford.edu/faculty-research/labs-initiatives/sil

=== Research contributions ===
Athey's early contributions included a new way to model uncertainty (the subject of her doctoral dissertation) and understand investor behavior given uncertainty, along with insights into the behavior of auctions. Athey's research on decision-making under uncertainty focused on conditions under which optimal decision policies would be monotone in a given parameter. She applied her results to establish conditions under which Nash equilibria would exist in auctions and other Bayesian games.

Athey's work changed the way auctions are held. In the early 1990s Athey uncovered the weaknesses of an overly lenient dispute mechanism through experiences selling computers to the U.S. government at auctions, discovering that open auctions which resulted in frequent legal disputes followed by settlements were actually rife with collusion (e.g., auction winners shared a portion of their spoils with losers who had cooperated in bidding). She also aided British Columbia in the design of their pricing system used for publicly owned timber. In addition, Athey published articles about auctions for online advertising and advised Microsoft about the design of their search advertising auctions.

=== Professional service ===
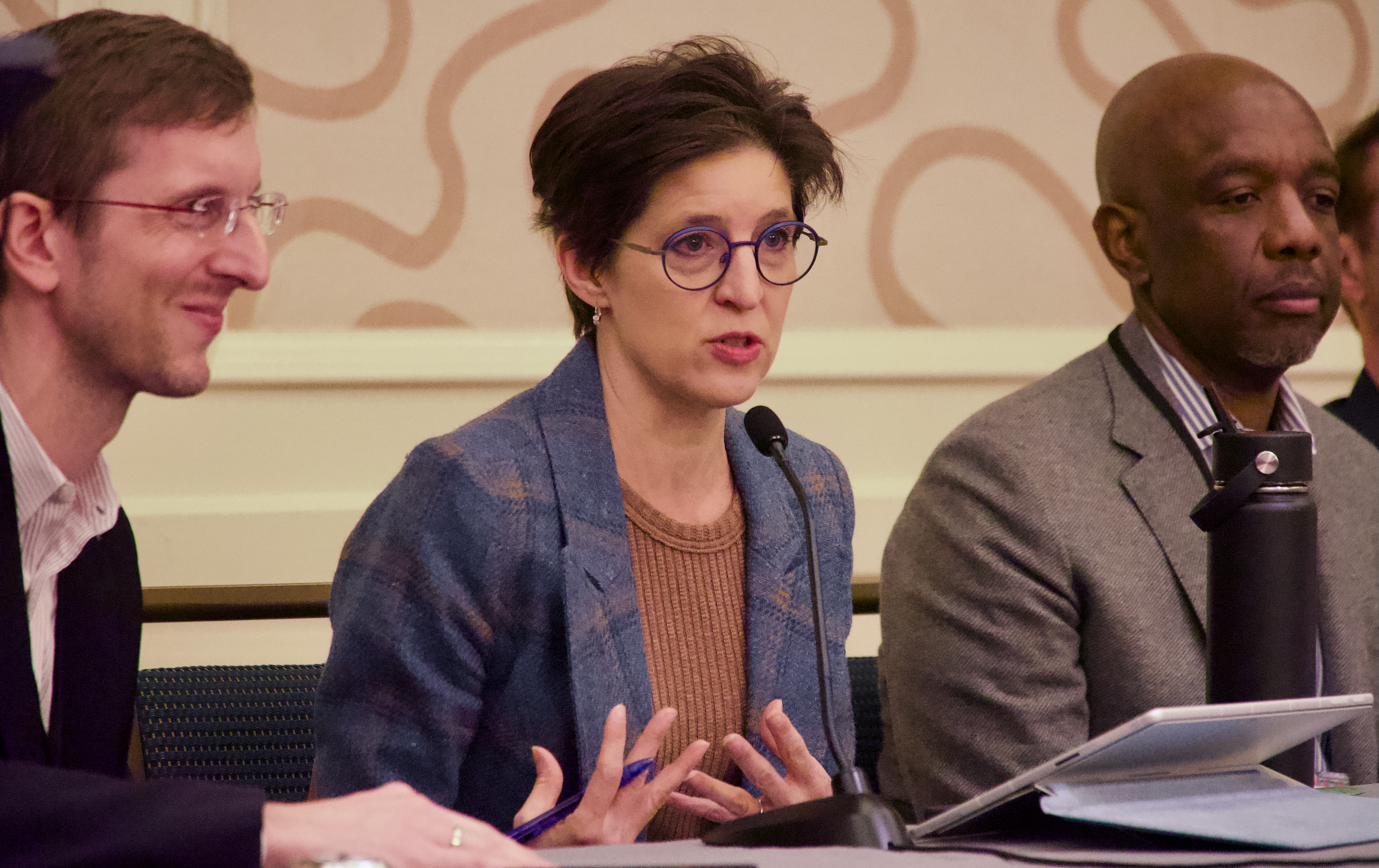
Susan Athey at AEA 2025 in San Francisco (Jan 3, 2025)

Athey has served as an associate editor of several leading journals, including the American Economic Review, Review of Economic Studies, and the RAND Journal of Economics, as well as the National Science Foundation economics panel, and she also served as an associate editor for Econometrica, Theoretical Economics, and the Quarterly Journal of Economics. She is a past co-editor of the Journal of Economics and Management Strategy and American Economic Journal: Microeconomics. She was the chair of the program committee for the 2006 North American Winter Meetings, and has served on numerous committees for the Econometric Society, the American Economic Association, and the Committee for the Status of Women in the Economics Profession. She is a member of President Obama's Committee for the National Medal of Science.

Furthermore, besides professional services in academic committees, Athey, as a "tech economist," also used to serve as consultant chief economist for Microsoft Corporation for a few years and now serves on the board of Expedia, Lending Club, Rover Turo, and Ripple. She also serves as a long-term advisor to the British Columbia Ministry of Forests, helping architect and implement their auction-based pricing system. Athey is the founding director of the Golub Capital Social Impact Lab at Stanford Graduate School of Business, and serves as the associate director of the Stanford Institute for Human-Centered Artificial Intelligence.

== Awards and honors ==
=== Academic ===
- Duke University Alice Baldwin Memorial Scholarship, 1990–1991
- Mary Love Collins Scholarship, Chi Omega Foundation, 1991–1992
- Jaedicke Scholar, Stanford Graduate School of Business, 1992–1993
- National Science Foundation Graduate Fellowship, 1991–1994
- State Farm Dissertation Award in Business, 1994
- State Farm Dissertation Award (1995)
- Elaine Bennett Research Prize (2000) (This award is given every other year to a young woman economist who has made outstanding contributions to any field.)
- Fellow of the Econometric Society (2004)
- John Bates Clark Medal (2007)
- Fellow of the American Academy of Arts and Sciences (2008)
- Stanford University Lieberman Fellowship
- Elected to the National Academy of Sciences (2012)
- Honorary Degree, Duke University (2009)
- Fisher-Shultz Lecture, Econometric Society (2011)
- Jean-Jacques Laffont Prize (2016)
- John von Neumann Award (2019)
- CME Group – MSRI Prize (2019)
- Honorary Doctorate, London Business School (2022)

=== Non-academic ===
- Kilby Award Foundation's Young Innovator Award, 1998
- Diversity MBA's Top 100 under 50 Diverse Executives
- Fast Company's 100 Most Creative People in Business
- World Economic Forum Young Global Leader, selected 2008
- World Innovation Summit on Entrepreneurship and Innovation's World's Most Innovative People Award, 2012
- Microsoft Research Distinguished Collaborator Award, 2016

== Publications ==
- —; Segal, Ilya (2013). "An Efficient Dynamic Mechanism". Econometrica. 81 (6): 2463–2485. doi:10.3982/ECTA6995.
- —; Coey, Dominic; Levin, Jonathan (2011). "Setasides and Subsidies in Timber Auctions" (PDF). American Economic Journal: Microeconomics. 5 (1): 1–27. doi:10.1257/mic.5.1.1. S2CID 3012150.
- —; Ellison, Glenn (2011). "Position Auctions with Consumer Search". Quarterly Journal of Economics. 126 (3): 1213–1270. doi:10.1093/qje/qjr028. S2CID 8681024.
- —; Levin, Jonathan; Seira, Enrique (2011). "Comparing Open and Sealed Bid Auctions: Theory and Evidence from Timber Auctions" (PDF). Quarterly Journal of Economics. 126 (1): 207–257. doi:10.1093/qje/qjq001. S2CID 14478418.
- —; Bagwell, Kyle (2008). "Collusion with Persistent Cost Shocks". Econometrica. 76 (3): 493–540. doi:10.1111/j.1468-0262.2008.00845.x. (Accepted subject to final revisions)
- —; Miller, David (2007). Irreversible Decisions under Uncertainty. Studies in Economic Theory. Vol. 2. pp. 299–354. doi:10.1007/978-3-540-73746-9. ISBN 978-3-540-73745-2.
- —; Imbens, Guido W. (2007). "Discrete Choice Models with Multiple Unobserved Choice Characteristics". International Economic Review. 48 (4): 1159–1192. doi:10.1111/j.1468-2354.2007.00458.x. S2CID 12392783.
- —; Imbens, Guido W. (2006). "Identification and Inference in Nonlinear Difference-In-Difference Models". Econometrica. 74 (2): 431–498. doi:10.1111/j.1468-0262.2006.00668.x.
- —; Atkeson, Andrew; Kehoe, Patrick J. (2005). "The Optimal Degree of Monetary Policy Discretion". Econometrica. 73 (5): 1431–1476. doi:10.1111/j.1468-0262.2005.00626.x. hdl:10419/152772. S2CID 5996103.
- —; Bagwell, Kyle; Sanchirico, Chris (2004). "Collusion and Price Rigidity". Review of Economic Studies. 71 (2): 317–349. doi:10.1111/0034-6527.00286. hdl:1721.1/63406.
- —; Haile, Philip (2002). "Identification in Standard Auction Models". Econometrica. 70 (6): 2107–2140. doi:10.1111/1468-0262.00371 (inactive 13 September 2025). hdl:1721.1/63793.
- —; Stern, Scott (2002). "The Impact of Information Technology on Emergency Health Care Outcomes". RAND Journal of Economics. 33 (3): 399–432. doi:10.3386/W7887. JSTOR 3087465. PMID 12585298. S2CID 6398638. Archived from the original on 2006-09-27.
- Athey, S. (2002). "Monotone Comparative Statics Under Uncertainty". Quarterly Journal of Economics. 117 (1): 187–223. doi:10.1162/003355302753399481. S2CID 14098229.
- —; Bagwell, Kyle (2001). "Optimal Collusion with Private Information". RAND Journal of Economics. 32 (3): 428–465. hdl:1721.1/63939. JSTOR 2696363. Archived from the original on 2008-06-26.
- Athey, Susan (2001). "Single Crossing Properties and the Existence of Pure Strategy Equilibria in Games of Incomplete Information". Econometrica. 69 (4): 861–890. doi:10.1111/1468-0262.00223. hdl:1721.1/64195.
- —; Levin, Jonathan (2001). "Information and Competition in U.S. Forest Service Timber Auctions". Journal of Political Economy. 109 (2): 375–417. doi:10.1086/319558. hdl:1721.1/63772. S2CID 158932760.
- —; Schmutzler, Armin (2001). "Investment and Market Dominance". RAND Journal of Economics. 32 (1): 1–26. JSTOR 2696395. Archived from the original on 2006-09-27.
- —; Avery, Chris; Zemsky, Peter (2000). "Mentoring and Diversity" (PDF). American Economic Review. 90 (4): 765–786. doi:10.1257/aer.90.4.765.
- —; Schmutzler, Armin (1995). "Product and Process Flexibility in an Innovative Environment". RAND Journal of Economics. 26 (4): 557–574. JSTOR 2556006. Archived from the original on 2006-09-27.

Academic offices
Preceded by Christina Romer	President of the American Economic Association; 2023–2024	Succeeded by Janet Currie
