= Trebel (music app) =

American music download and discovery platform

- Type: Private
- Industry: Audio streaming, music downloading
- Founded: 2014; 12 years ago
- Founder: Gary Mekikian; Corey Jones; Luis Soto Durazo
- Headquarters: Stamford, Connecticut, USA
- Key people: Vinnie Freda (President)
- Website: home.trebel.io

Trebel is an on-demand music download and discovery platform developed by M&M Media Inc. The company's business model aims to combat digital music piracy by giving users access to on-demand music at no cost while delivering fair compensation to artists and music rights holders. Trebel has a patent that allows it to market itself as the only international music service in which users can legally download music and listen to it offline for free.

As of March 2023, Trebel has a catalog of 75 million songs from record labels such as Universal Music Group, Sony Music Entertainment, Warner Music Group and hundreds of independent labels.

Trebel is based in Stamford, Connecticut. with additional locations in Mexico City, Jakarta, Bogota, Los Angeles and Miami. The app is available ~~i~~n the Apple App Store, Google Play Store, and Huawei AppGallery.

== History ==
Trebel was founded in 2014 by Gary Mekikian, who was previously the co-founder of answerFriend, Inc., which commercialized web based question-answering technologies and merged with Electric Knowledge, forming InQuira. This company was eventually acquired by Oracle Corporation in 2011. His co-founders at Trebel include Stanford classmates Corey Jones and Luis Soto Durazo, as well as his daughters Grace and Juliette.

Mekikian envisioned Trebel as an alternative to music piracy after a high school classmate of his daughters was targeted by cyberattackers while illegally downloading music online.

Trebel was initially released in 2015 under the name Project Carmen to students at Ohio State, Santa Monica College, Cal State Fullerton, UCLA and Long Beach State. In its original incarnation, the service planned to target students at 3,000 universities and 30,000 high schools in the United States. A beta version of the app was introduced in 2016 with content from Universal Music Group and Warner Music Group.

Trebel launched commercially in the United States and Mexico in 2018. In 2018, Mexican mass-media corporation Televisa also became a minority investor in Trebel.

In May 2020, during the early months of the COVID-19 pandemic, Trebel was a digital broadcast partner for Se Agradece_{,} a concert produced in Mexico by Televisa to honor frontline COVID workers that featured artists such as Rosalia, J Balvin, Maluma and Ricky Martin.

In June 2021, Trebel reached 3 million monthly active users.

In October 2021, Trebel signed a music licensing agreement with Merlin Network, the licensing agency for the independent music sector that controls an estimated 12% of the global digital recorded music market.

In January 2022, Trebel announced a strategic alliance with MNC Corporation, an Indonesian media conglomerate, which also became a minority backer of the company.

In March 2022, Trebel reported 5.2 million monthly active users as a result of growth in Latin America. In the same month,, Latin music star Maluma became a backer of Trebel and an advisor to Gary Mekikian, helping expand the service throughout Latin America.

On April 18, 2022, Trebel launched in Indonesia during the finale of the music competition show X Factor Indonesia. Trebel also signed a deal that month with Soccer Media Solutions, a sports and entertainment marketing agency in Mexico, to sell Trebel’s premium advertising inventory through Soccer Media.

In May 2022, Guillermo Ochoa, goalkeeper for the Mexican national soccer team, invested in Trebel and became an ambassador for the company.

On October 2, 2022, Trebel collaborated with Musica Studios, one of the largest music companies in Indonesia, on the production of a music festival in Jakarta titled Trebel Music Fest. The event featured performances by top Indonesian music artists such as Noah, Nidji, and d'Masiv.

In October 2022, Trebel launched in Colombia. The service reached 1.2 million monthly active users in Colombia six months after launching.

In December 2022, Trebel collaborated with KFC in Indonesia on the release of a KFC digital music program using a product called Trebel Max. As part of the program, KFC customers who bought the Crazy Superstar Combo package at KFC received a subscription to Trebel Max for 30 days.

Trebel announced the launch of Trebel AI in May 2023. Trebel AI uses ChatGPT-powered technology to generate playlists based on natural language queries from users. In Indonesia, the Trebel AI feature was announced during a broadcast of the show Indonesian Idol XII that took place on May 8, 2023.

In July 2023, Trebel reached more than 13 million monthly active users.

In November 2023, Trebel became a featured app on the Discord app directory. Discord users that add the Trebel bot to their servers have access to Trebel's on-demand music library and have the exclusive privilege of being DJ's during server sessions with up to 150 concurrent listeners.

== Platform ==
=== Features ===
Trebel has a patent that allows it to market itself as the only international music service in which users can legally download music and listen to it offline for free.

As of March 2023, Trebel has a catalog of 75 million songs from record labels such as Universal Music Group, Sony Music Entertainment, Warner Music Group and hundreds of independent labels.

Trebel offers unlimited music downloads that are playable in the app by registered users only. Offline listening is free to all users and not blocked by a paywall. Users can search for music based on song, artist, album, browsing friends' recent activity, and through other users' playlists. The app also offers free cloud storage for downloaded songs.

Trebel also contains a feature called SongID, which identifies music being played nearby using a short sample, then offers it for download on the service. Podcasts are available for free listening on the service as well.

=== Business model ===
Trebel uses a business model that generates revenue from the sale of digital advertising as well as user interactions with branded experiences, and consumption of virtual goods within the app (akin to mobile games).

The app also features a brand takeover feature called Trebel Max, which offers unlimited access in exchange for users engaging with experiences offered by specific brands. Trebel’s brand partners include Uber, KFC, Walmart, Coca-Cola, Amazon and P&G.

=== Content ===
In September 2022, Trebel secured an exclusive release of the song “Suara Hatiku” by Indonesian actress Amanda Monopo. As of March 2023, Trebel offers 75 million songs through licensing agreements with Universal Music Group, Sony Music Entertainment, Warner Music Group and global indie rights agency Merlin.

== Awards ==
In 2023, Trebel won three Google Play awards including "Best App of 2023", "Best Everyday Essentials" and "Users' Choice".
