= Donald John Roberts =

Canadian-American economist (1945–2026)

- Born: February 11, 1945; Winnipeg, Manitoba, Canada
- Died: January 23, 2026 (aged 80)

Academic background
- Doctoral advisor: Hugo F. Sonnenschein

Academic work
- Doctoral students: Susan Athey

Donald John Roberts (February 11, 1945 – January 23, 2026) was a Canadian-American economist who was the John H. and Irene S. Scully Professor of Economics, Strategic Management and International Business at the Stanford Graduate School of Business.

== Life and career ==
Born in Winnipeg, Manitoba, Roberts received his bachelor's degree from the University of Manitoba in 1967, and his doctorate in economics from the University of Minnesota in 1972. In 2007 he received a Doctor of Laws degree (honoris causa) from the University of Winnipeg.

After graduation he taught at Northwestern University from 1971 until coming to Stanford in 1980. From 1980 until 2001 he held the Jonathan B. Lovelace Professorship at the school. He was a senior associate dean of the Stanford Graduate School of Business in charge of external relations and executive education from 2000 to 2008. and he also was a professor (by courtesy) in the Department of Economics at Stanford, and he directed the Global Management Program and the Center for Global Business and the Economy at the Stanford Graduate School of Business. He was the doctoral thesis advisor for several well known economists, notably John Bates Clark Medal winner Susan Athey.

Roberts was a fellow and former council member of the Econometric Society, and fellow of the American Academy of Arts and Sciences He has served on the editorial boards of multiple economics journals.

In 2002, Roberts received the Excellence in Teaching Award from the Stanford Graduate School of Business' Sloan Master's Program. In 2004, The Economist named his book The Modern Firm the year's best business book, and in 2005 he received the school's Robert T. Davis Faculty Lifetime Achievement Award.

Roberts died on January 23, 2026, at the age of 80.

== Work ==
Roberts' research focuses on the design, governance and management of organizations, especially in an international context. He also has published extensively on industrial competition and the influence of differences in information among parties on strategic behavior.

=== Games of incomplete information in economic modeling ===
With Paul Milgrom he was instrumental in introducing the use of games of incomplete information into economic modeling and also with bringing the methods of lattice programming into the study of monotone comparative statics in economic analysis.

Most recently, he has been involved in two path-breaking controlled experiments in large firms examining the effects of changing management practices. One study involves Indian cotton weaving firms. The other involves a large Chinese service company.

== Selected publications ==
Roberts was the author of more than 70 scholarly articles and co-author of the first textbook on the economics of organization and management.

- Roberts, John. The modern firm: Organizational design for performance and growth. Oxford University Press, 2004.

Articles, a selection

- Roberts, Donald John. "Existence of Lindahl equilibrium with a measure space of consumers." Journal of Economic Theory 6.4 (1973): 355–381.
- Champsaur, Paul, Donald John Roberts, and Robert W. Rosenthal. "On cores in economies with public goods." International Economic Review (1975): 751–764.
- Roberts, Donald John; Postlewaite, Andrew (1976). "The incentives for price-taking behavior in large exchange economies" (PDF). Econometrica: Journal of the Econometric Society: 115–127.
- Roberts, Donald John. "The Lindahl solution for economies with public goods." Journal of Public Economics 3.1 (1974): 23–42.
- Gary Mekikian and Roberts, Donald John. (2009) Note on IT Services Industry, Economics, Stanford Graduate School of Business.
