= Gary Mekikian =

American entrepreneur and investor

- Mekikian in 2015
- Born: Garo Mekikian; Yerevan, Armenia
- Education: Stanford University; University of Southern California
- Occupations: CEO of M&M Media, Inc.
- Years active: 1993 — present
- Known for: Technology and software entrepreneurship
- Board member of: Chairman, M&M Media, Inc., Stanford Graduate School of Business MSx Program
- Website: la2dc.org

Gary Mekikian is an American businessman who is the co-founder and chief executive officer (CEO) of M&M Media Inc, a Los Angeles–based media technology company. Prior to M&M Media, Mekikian co-founded International Integration, also known as i-Cube; answerfriend, which became Inquira; and GATeIC.

Mekikian is a co-organizer of LA2DC.org, a Los Angeles–based organization whose mission is to raise awareness of modern-day genocides and the Holocaust, and to eliminate genocide as a war tactic.

Mekikian has a BS in electrical engineering from the University of Southern California and an MS from Stanford University, and he holds patents in media technologies and medical devices. Mekikian is a member of Stanford University's Graduate School of Business MSx Alumni Advisory Board. He collaborates with Stanford University professors Dr. William Barnett and Dr. John Roberts to write and teach case studies on entrepreneurship, information technology, semiconductor industry, and the mobile internet.

== Education ==
After attending Hollywood High School for two years, Mekikian earned an electrical engineering degree from University of Southern California and an MS from Stanford University.

== Career ==
=== Early ventures ===
In 1993, after working at Hewlett-Packard Company as a sales engineer, Mekikian joined the founding team at International Integration Inc., also known as i-Cube, which went public in 1998. i-Cube was acquired by Razorfish, Inc. in 1999.

Mekikian began working with Dr. Deniz Yuret, a researcher in Natural Language Processing at Massachusetts Institute of Technology, and Sundar Subramaniam, a co-founder of i-Cube, to found answerFriend, Inc., which developed commercialized web based question-answering technologies. In 2002, answerFriend merged with another natural language processing technology company, Electric Knowledge, to form InQuira. In 2011, Oracle Corporation acquired Inquira.

In 2006, Mekikian co-founded GATeIC a semiconductor IP company.

=== M&M Media / TREBEL Music ===
In 2014, after a patent was issued on a new method of delivering and monetizing digital media on mobile and desktop devices, Mekikian co-founded M&M Media, Inc., a digital music distribution company that released the TREBEL Music app to reduce digital media piracy by specifically targeting a demographic which uses piracy as a form of digital media consumption.

TREBEL Music operates in Indonesia, Mexico, Colombia, and the US, and its investors include fashion mogul, Chris Burch, global pop star Maluma, NBA basketball star, Thaddeus Young, soccer star Memo Ochoa, and Indonesian media mogul, Hary Tanoesoedibjo.

== Genocide Awareness and Prevention ==
In 2015, the descendants of the survivors of the Armenian genocide commemorated the 100th anniversary of the first genocide of the 20th century around the world. Mekikian, along with a group of Armenian Americans, organized an event which was titled LA2DC, a coast-to-coast, running and cycling, relay marathon. The purpose of the event is to increase awareness of modern-day genocides, and prevent genocides from being used as a war tactic. Over a thousand athletes ran and cycled non-stop, from Los Angeles to Washington DC, to deliver a petition to Congress - a message of gratitude to Americans and others who worked to prevent genocides, and rescued the survivors. Mekikian and colleagues authored the petition which was delivered in a relay baton to Congressman Adam Schiff who read it on the floor of the House of Representatives on May 20, 2015.

== Bibliography ==
- Prof. William Barnett and Gary Mekikian, (2013) Mercado Libre, Leadership and Managing People, Stanford Graduate School of Business
- Gary Mekikian and Prof. John Roberts, (2009) Note on IT Services Industry, Economics, Stanford Graduate School of Business
- Gary Mekikian and Prof. John Roberts, (2009) Tata Consultancy Services, Globalization of IT Services, Economics,
- Prof. William Barnett and Gary Mekikian, (2008) Creating Qualcomm, Organizational Behavior, Entrepreneurship, Stanford Graduate School of Business
