= Re:publica =

Annual conference held in Berlin

re:publica
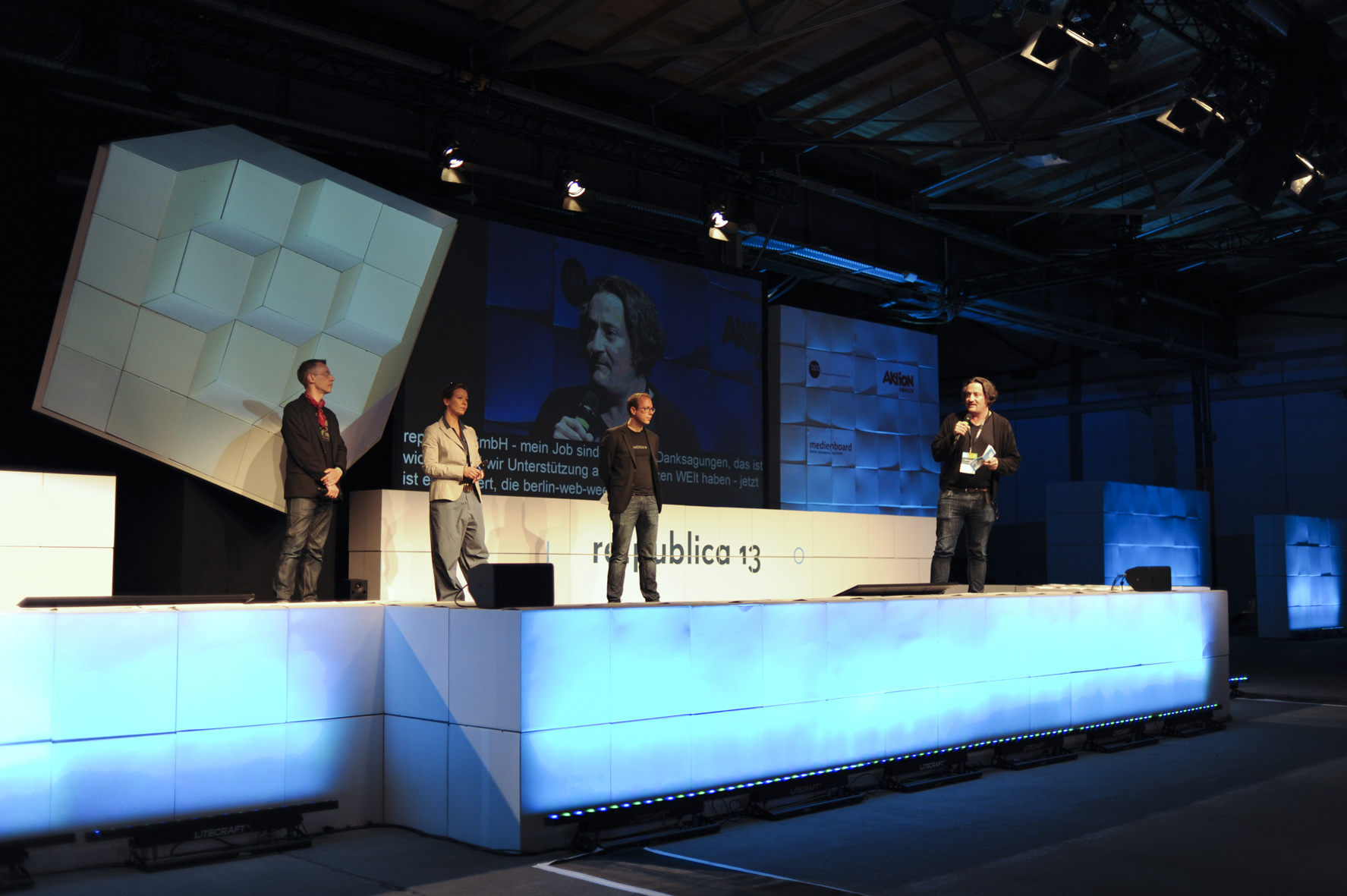
- Opening of re:publica '13. (l.r.r. Johnny Haeusler, Tanja Haeusler, Markus Beckedahl and Andreas Gebhard
- Genre: Conferences
- Frequency: Annually
- Location: Berlin
- Country: Germany
- Inaugurated: 11 to 13 April 2007
- Participants: 1200
- Attendance: 30,000
- Website: https://re-publica.com/en

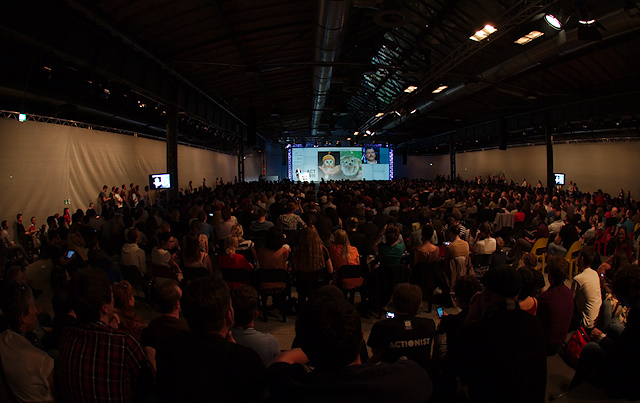
Sascha Lobos talk, stage 1, 2012

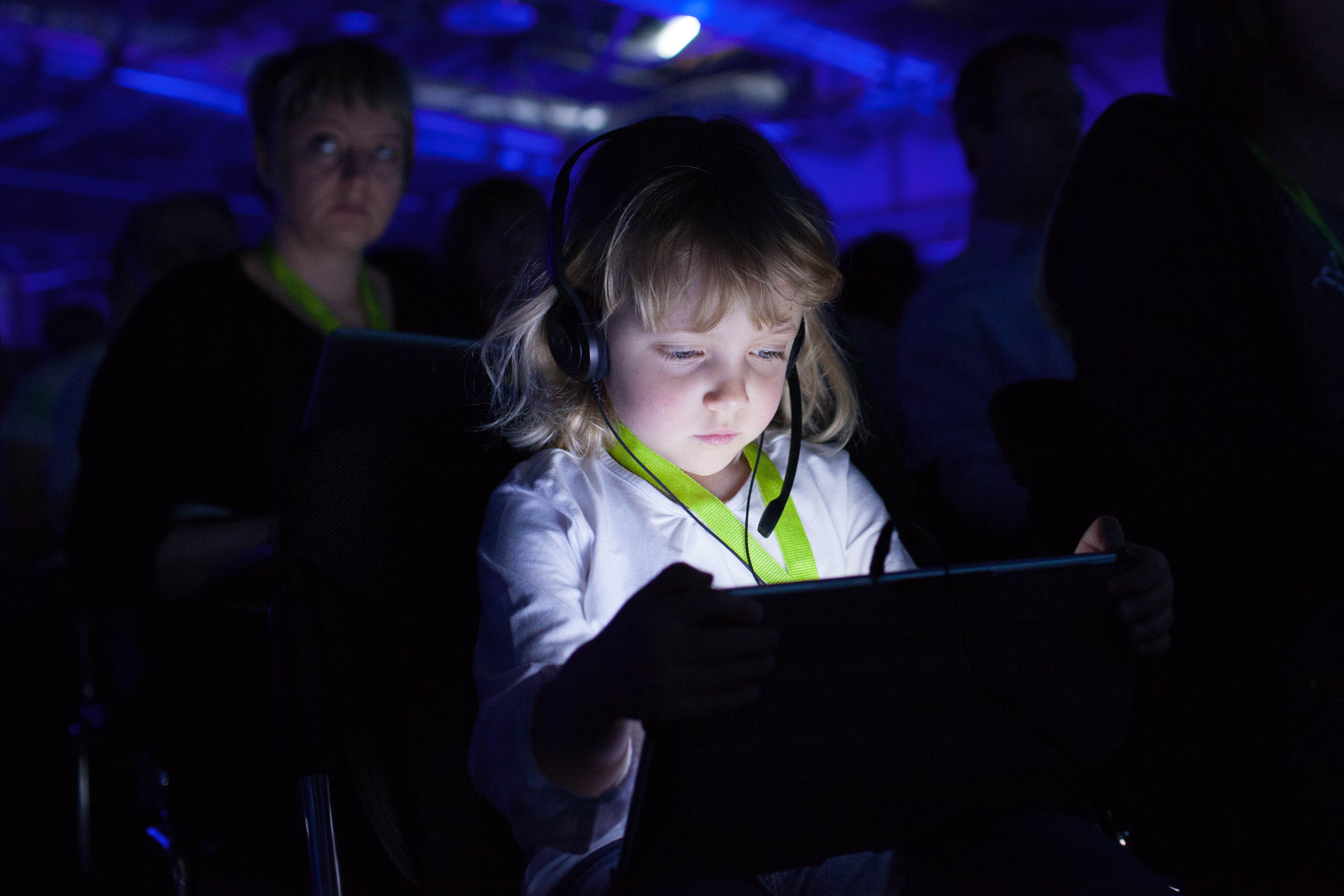
A child looks at a tablet at re:publica 2015.

re:publica is a conference in Europe that deals with Web 2.0, especially blogs, social media, and information society. It annually takes place in May in Berlin. For three days, talks and workshops about various topics are held, ranging from media and culture over politics and technology to entertainment. All talks and discussions are streamed directly to the internet.

The conference is organized by the operators of the German blogs Spreeblick and netzpolitik.org and is funded by Medienboard Berlin-Brandenburg and Bundeszentrale für politische Bildung. Re:publica's name originates from res publica, Latin for 'public matter'.

== History ==
The first re:publica, with the slogan "Leben im Netz" (Life in the internet), took place from 11 to 13 April 2007 and attracted about 700 visitors. Over the years the event grew continually, with 5,000 international visitors and about 350 speakers in 2013. Each year, different main focusses were set, for example data protection in 2008 and intellectual property rights and political aspects of internet usage in 2009.

In 2011, Daniel Domscheit-Berg introduced the project OpenLeaks as a planned politically neutral alternative to WikiLeaks during the conference.

A highlight in 2012 was a talk with the European Commissioner for Digital Agenda Neelie Kroes who demanded to stop ACTA and SOPA.

The eighth re:publica, titled "Into the Wild", took place in May 2014. The conference had 350 sessions on 18 stages, 500 volunteers and 6000 people overall.

The ninth re:publica took place from 5 May 2015 to 7 May 2015 with over 7,000 people attending and 450 speakers.

In 2023, re:publica teamed up with the Reeperbahn Festival for the first time. In addition to the Berlin re:publica, a two-day event was held in September.

In 2025, re:publica attracted a total of 30,000 visitors over the three days of the festival. The programme included over 650 programme sessions with more than 1,200 speakers.

== Events ==
- re:publica'07 – Leben im Netz
- re:publica'08 – Die kritische Masse
- re:publica'09 – Shift happens
- re:publica'10 – now here
- re:publica'11
- re:publica'12 – Act!on
- re:publica'13 – IN/SIDE/OUT
- re:publica'14 – INTO THE WILD
- re:publica'15 – Finding Europe
- re:publica'16 – TƎИ
- re:publica'17 – Love out Loud!
- re:publica'18 – POP
- re:publica'19 – tl;dr
- re:publica'20 – ASAP
- re:publica'21 – In the Mean Time
- re:publica'22 – Any Way the Wind Blows
- re:publica'23 and re:publica x Reeperbahn Festival – CASH
- re:publica'24 – Who cares?
- re:publica'25 – Generation XYZ
- re:publica'26 – Never gone give up
  Geraldine de Bastion, Carole Cadwalladr at Stage 1 at re:publica 2026 in Berlin: "How to never give up: investigating (and suviving) techno-authoritarianism. A conversation with Carole Cadwalladr"

== See also ==
- ConventionCamp
- TED (conference)
