= Rough Trade (shops) =

Independent record shops

- Founded: 1976
- Founder: Geoff Travis
- Headquarters: Nottingham, United Kingdom
- Owner: Beggars Group; Mathieu Pigasse
- Website: www.roughtrade.com

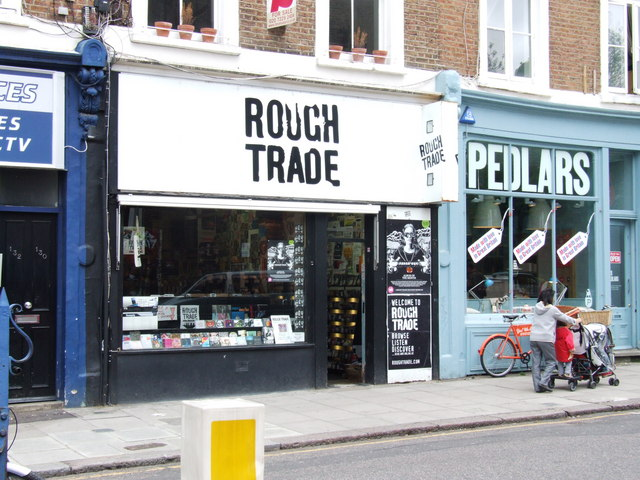
Rough Trade West, Talbot Road

Rough Trade is a music retailer headquartered in Nottingham, England. It operates an online store and a chain of record shops in the United Kingdom, United States and Germany.

The first Rough Trade shop was opened on 23 February 1976 by Geoff Travis in the Ladbroke Grove district of West London. Travis reportedly took the name from the Canadian art punk/new wave band Rough Trade. In 1978, the shop spawned Rough Trade Records, which later became the label of bands from The Smiths to The Libertines. In 1982, the two separated and the shop remains an independent entity from the label, although links between the two are strong. At the same time, the shop moved from its original location on Kensington Park Road round the corner to Talbot Road. In 1988, a shop opened in Neal's Yard, Covent Garden. At various times there were also shops in San Francisco (on Grant St., then Sixth Street, then Haight Street and finally 3rd and Townsend Streets), Tokyo and Paris. They were eventually closed following the rise of music sales on the internet.

In 2007, the chain began to grow again, opening Rough Trade East in Dray Walk, Brick Lane, in East London. There are now 9 shops worldwide with 7 shops in the UK, one in New York City, USA, and one in Berlin, Germany.

Rough Trade's holding company is jointly owned by XL Recordings, a division of Beggars Group and sister label to Rough Trade Records, and Matthieu Pigasse. Its directors include Pigasse and Beggars Group founder Martin Mills.

Rough Trade has been accused by other record shops of abusing its dominant market position, for example by using its links to record labels to negotiate more exclusive releases.

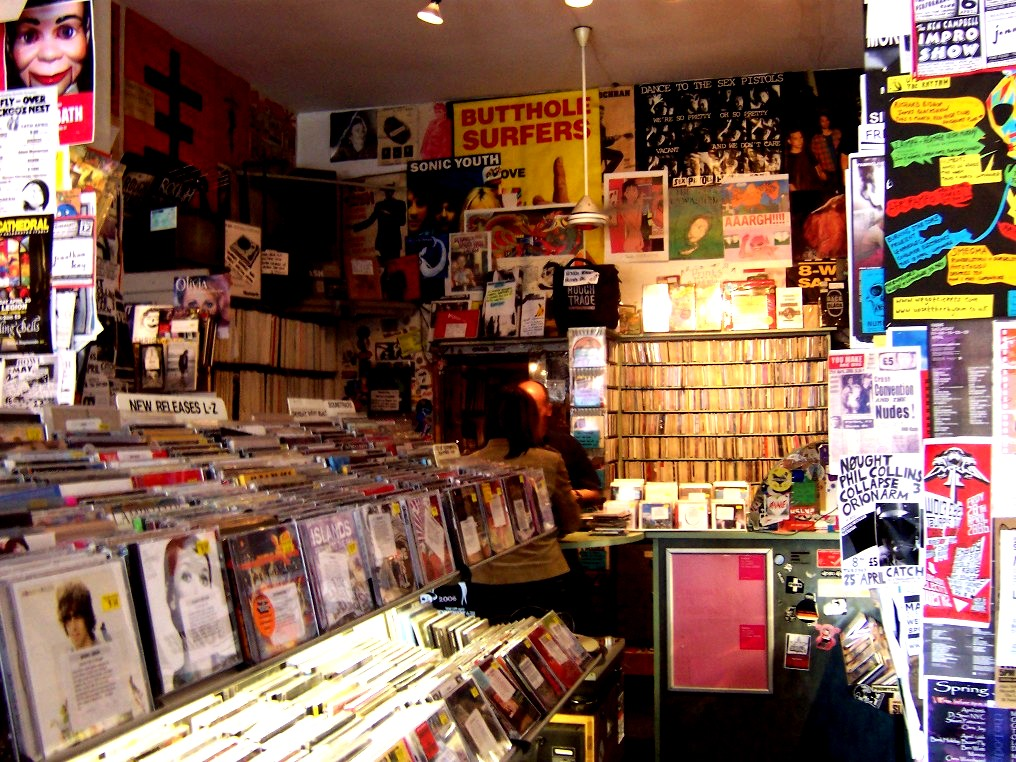
Rough Trade on 130 Talbot Road

== Record shops ==
=== London, Ladbroke Grove (Rough Trade West) ===
The store was the first Rough Trade shop and opened at 202 Kensington Park Road in 1976. It later moved to 130 Talbot Road where it continues to trade today.

=== London, Brick Lane (Rough Trade East) ===
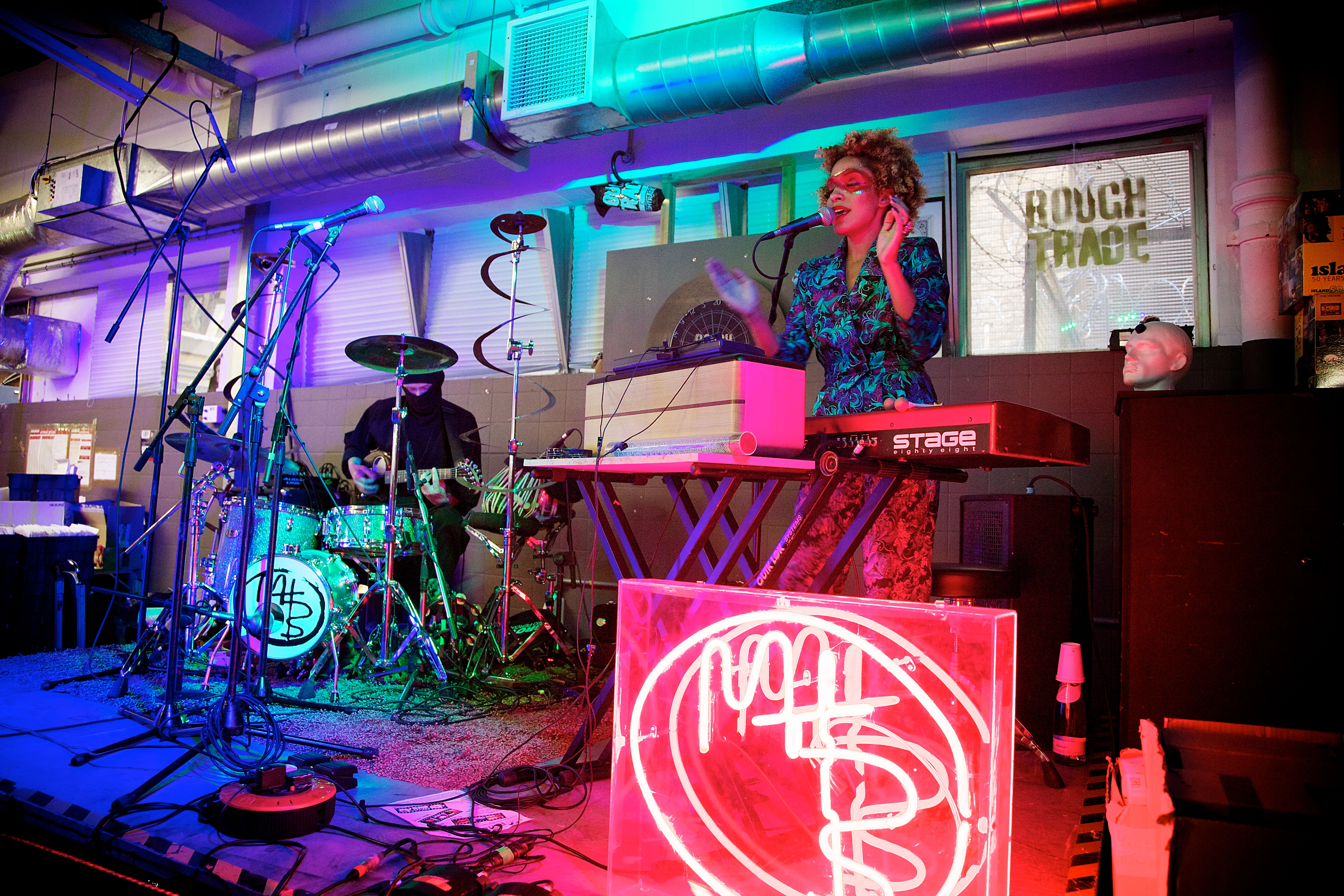
Martina Topley-Bird performing at Rough Trade East, Brick Lane, London (photo July 2010)

In July 2007, Rough Trade opened a 5,000-square-foot (460 m^{2}) shop in Brick Lane. The shop, called "Rough Trade East", is located in the former Truman's Brewery in a courtyard off Brick Lane and puts on music gigs with a stage, allowing for an audience of 300. Gig ticketing is usually the cost of entry with the purchase of a full price album, either bought ahead from the shop to gain a ticket or bought online via the DICE platform, where the customer picks up the record at the door.

The shop sells some chart titles, music from bands without distribution deals with a quarter of the merchandise is vinyl. Every item, vinyl and CD, has a written description to encourage browsing and discovery. Designed by David Adjaye the shop has a fair trade café and a "snug" area with iMacs, sofas and desks.

In the first half of 2007, CD sales had fallen by 10 percent and in the month of the shop opening the UK music chain Fopp went into administration. Stephen Godfroy, the store director, said, "I don't think music belongs on the high street as the high street exists at the moment", and that retailers, not the consumers, are to blame for the decline in sales. In September 2007, sales in Rough Trade East had exceeded expectations by 20 percent. Stephen Godfroy explained that "You've got to create an environment where people want to spend time. It's got to be complementary to modern lifestyles, distinctive and competitive on pricing and have confidence in recommending exciting new products and not rely on chart product."

=== New York City ===
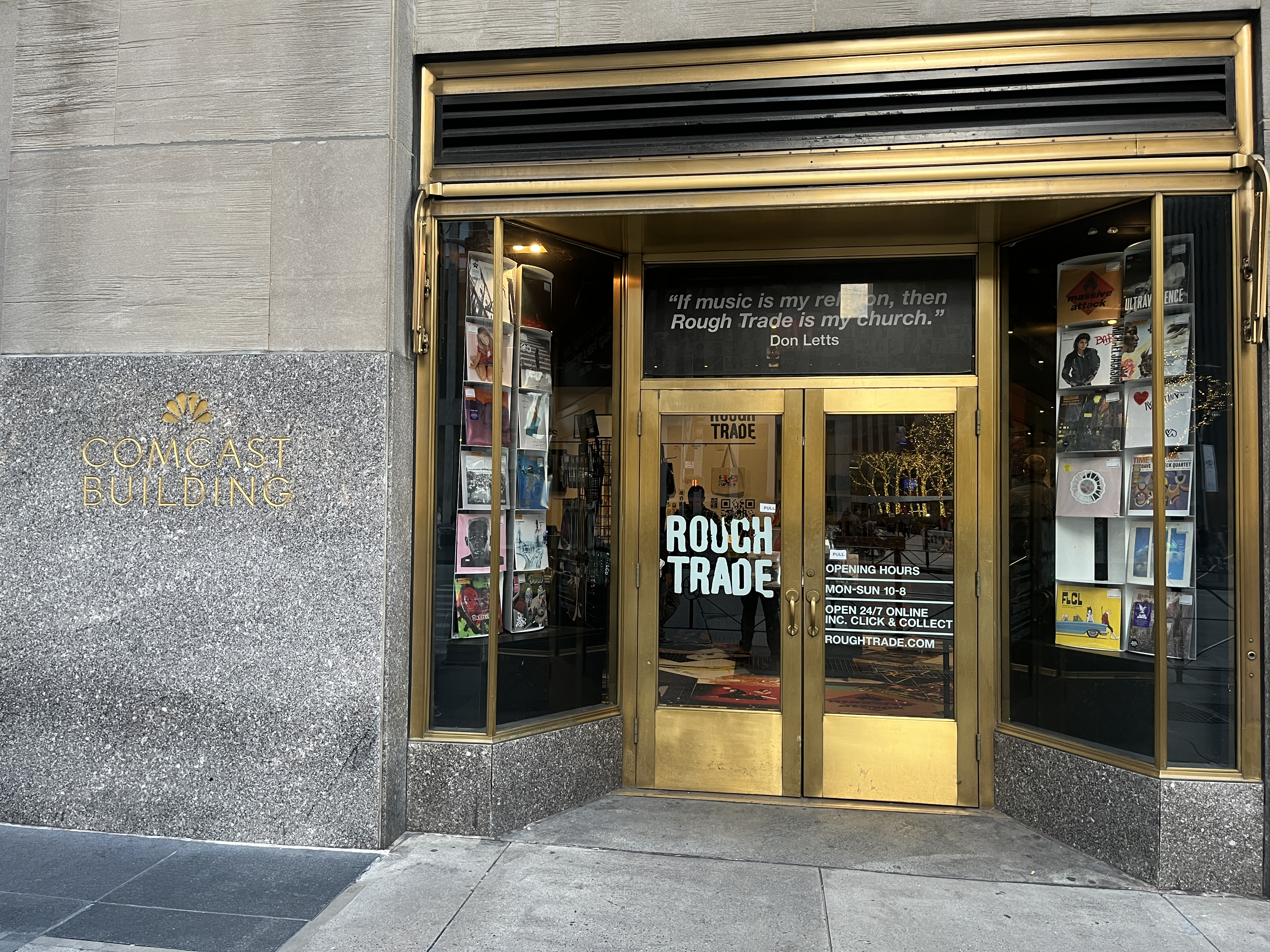
Rough Trade NYC storefront

In April 2012, it was announced that Rough Trade would be opening a store in the Williamsburg neighbourhood of Brooklyn, in partnership with Bowery Presents. The store, including a performance space and a coffee counter, was initially scheduled to open in late 2012. The store opened on 25 November 2013, becoming the biggest record store in New York City.

The Brooklyn store closed in March 2021, moving to a new, smaller location at 30 Rockefeller Plaza in June. In January 2025, it was announced that Rough Trade would be opening a second store at Rockefeller Center located below the current store. The smaller existing store at street level was renamed Rough Trade Above while the new location, Rough Trade Below, occupies 4,000 square feet and features a large selection of merch, audio hardware, new and used CDs and vinyl records, movies, collectibles and more. The expansion will "increase the capacity for in-store events from several dozen to a couple of hundred spectators". Rough Trade Below, which is located in front of the 47th–50th Streets–Rockefeller Center station, opened on 8 April 2025.

=== Nottingham ===
Rough Trade opened a store on Broad Street in Nottingham's Lace Market area in 2014. The store has a bar and performance area on the first floor.

The opening of the shop in Nottingham was thought to threaten existing independent shops, with the struggling Music Exchange shop closing 18 months later.

=== Bristol ===
Following the closure of the Rise record shop in Bristol, a Rough Trade branch opened in its former locality on Nelson Street in December 2017.

=== Liverpool ===
In 2024, Rough Trade opened its first shop in the north of England, in Liverpool, where it is situated in the Hanover Street district of the Liverpool One shopping complex.

=== Berlin ===
In April 2024, Rough Trade expanded to the European mainland by opening a shop in the Neukölln quarter of Berlin, Germany.

=== London, Denmark Street ===
Rough Trade opened a record shop on Denmark Street, which has been associated with British popular music since the 1950s, in October 2024.

=== London, Rough Trade Vintage ===
In October 2022, Rough Trade opened a branch in the basement of a Rag & Bone shop on Beak Street in the Soho district in London. Following the opening of the store on Denmark Street, the Beak Street shop rebranded to Rough Trade Vintage, which is focusing on used records.

The store closed on 31 July 2026.

=== Formerly ===
==== Rough Trade Neal's Yard, Covent Garden ====
The Covent Garden shop opened in 1988 and was located in the basement of Slam City Skates in Neal's Yard. It closed down shortly before Rough Trade East opened in 2007.

== Compilations ==
Musically, Rough Trade Shops' own music releases often follow the post-punk genre, but carry items through a range of genres, mostly within the alternative or underground scenes. Recently the shop has released several compilation albums, each focusing on an individual genre such as indie-pop, electronica, country, singer songwriter, rock and roll and post-punk. Every January since 2003, it has released a compilation putting together the best (in the opinion of the shops' staff) of the previous year's music entitled Counter Culture. In 2007, there was also the release of Counter Culture 76, reflecting the music of year the shop opened. It also released a 4-CD box set for its 25th anniversary in 2001, and a special collection of songs chosen by customers was released to celebrate the 30th anniversary in 2006.

== See also ==
- Rough Trade Records
- Cassette culture
