= Independent Music Companies Association =

Non-profit trade body of European independent music companies

The Independent Music Companies Association (IMPALA), originally the Independent Music Publishers and Labels Association, is a non-profit trade association established in 2000 to help European independent record labels represent their agenda and promote independent music. Its offices are in Brussels, Belgium. IMPALA is a member of the Worldwide Independent Network (WIN), a coalition of independent music bodies from countries throughout the world. In 2025, IMPALA started a new co-funded work programme as a European Union cultural network.

== History ==
IMPALA was founded in 2000 by national trade associations and key independent labels, as a non-profit organisation dedicated to small and medium-sized enterprises in the music industry.

In 2008, an Action Plan for Music was launched and in 2010 an Action Plan for Finance was published.

In January 2015, IMPALA launched its Digital Action Plan, a ten-point plan calling for a new European industrial policy to drive the digital market through the cultural and creative sectors. The action plan calls on the EU to reinforce copyright, and other key measures, including promoting diversity in a measurable way and devising a new regulatory, competition, social and fiscal framework for smaller actors.

To celebrate IMPALA's 15th anniversary, from September 2015 various initiatives took place across Europe under the "IMPALA 15" banner, such as the Reeperbahn Festival at Hamburg, Germany.

In March 2016, IMPALA launched a monthly feature to put the spotlight on Europe's most inspiring young independent labels, known as the Young Label Spotlight. On 24 September 2018, Paul Pacifico, CEO of the UK's Association of Independent Music and Michel Lambot, co-founder and co-president of the PIAS Group, co-represented IMPALA, the body representing European indie record labels, at the expert workshop organised by the Centre for Fine Arts in Brussels (BOZAR), the European Cultural Foundation and the British Council about Brexit and the cultural sector. The goal was "to reaffirm our shared intent and common values, and to produce practical recommendations from the cultural and creative sectors that go beyond those that have already been made", and a list of recommendations was afterwards published on the IMPALA website.

As part of its role of representing independent music companies at EU level, IMPALA was involved in the discussions on the EU Copyright Directive, and is working on competition issues such as Sony's buyout of EMI Music Publishing in 2018, or the sale of Universal Music Group's shares.

In 2019, IMPALA acknowledged the climate emergency and committed to making the independent sector ecologically sustainable and regenerative, as well as using its voice to support Music Declares Emergency in Brussels.

In 2020, IMPALA established a COVID-19 Task Force and adopted a crisis plan, mapping tool and recovery package, as well as a set of second stage recommendations, helping culture to be recognised as one of Europe's fourteen priority sectors for recovery in the EU.

In October 2020, IMPALA adopted a Diversity and Inclusion Charter, a set of commitments dedicated to the European independent sector.

In November 2020, The organisation announced a year long series of podcasts, playlists and other projects to celebrate IMPALA's 20th birthday on a dedicated blog page.

In March 2021, IMPALA launched IMPALA Campus, an EU-funded training programme for recorded music professionals and self-releasing artists taking place spring and summer 2021 in partnership with four leading music conferences across Europe.

On 23 March 2021, IMPALA released a paper “It’s Time to Challenge the Flow: How to make the most of the real opportunities of streaming” and a ten-point plan with recommendations to music services to reform streaming.

The IMPALA sustainability task force developed a sustainability programme which was published in April 2021. The programme includes European independent music sector carbon goals for 2026 (net zero) and 2030 (net positive), along with a 15-commitment climate charter, voluntary tools, tips and guidance for members of the association.

In July 2021, IMPALA and IAO released a proposal for a GECAT Pass (for Geographical European Cultural Area Touring), with the idea to get small and medium-sized music tours back on the road quickly and efficiently. The approach involves creating a new cultural area with a single touring permit, instead of treating Europe as a number of distinct blocs and countries.

In March 2022, IMPALA made a statement on the war in Ukraine and has been encouraging support for the Ukrainian culture sector together with other European cultural associations.

On 29 March 2022, IMPALA launched a new programme to boost diversity in the European independent music sector in partnership with YouTube called “100 Artists to Watch”. This new programme replaces IMPALA's annual European Independent Album of the Year Award, which had a great roll of 10 years.

In April 2022, the association and Julie's Bicycle have launched the first bespoke carbon calculator for the independent music sector. This was followed with the launch of IMPALA's Climate Training and Standards project IMPACTS. This EU funded project aims to build new climate literacy capacity for independent music companies across Europe to help them lower their carbon footprint.

In May 2022, during EU diversity month, IMPALA launched the Changemaker Award as part of its equity, diversity and inclusion work, the award aims to put the spotlight on projects that promote change in the independent sector and inspire others to take action. The first recipient of this new award is the POWER UP initiative, which supports Black music creators and industry professionals and executives, as well as addressing anti-Black racism and racial disparities in the music sector. Later in May, IMPALA released a report on the first diversity and inclusion survey of the independent sector, “Towards a more diverse and inclusive independent music sector” to close its programme for European Diversity Month.

In April 2023, IMPALA released its climate standards report which establishes a framework to start looking at how sector-wide benchmarks and standards might be developed. This was developed by IMPALA's own Climate Analysis Group with input and approval provided by climate experts represented by Thema1 and Julie's Bicycle.

Following a month-long review process launched on the second anniversary of IMPALA's ten-point streaming plan, the independent sector issued a new call to action in April 2023. Building on IMPALA's initial recommendations to make streaming fairer and provide a dynamic, compelling, and responsible future for creators and fans, IMPALA's new call was based on three key themes:

- Getting more money into the market and making sure there is no dilution of revenues.
- Changing how revenue is shared.
- Boosting diversity, transparency and climate action.

In May 2023, For the second edition of its Changemaker award, IMPALA honoured the UK not-for-profit organisation Women in CTRL, for their work developing and supporting music creators and music professionals from under-represented groups.

In June 2023, IMPALA released its first membership Carbon Calculator report footprinting independent labels and examining initial trends amongst users.

In July 2023, IMPALA joined other European music organisations in calling for EU member states to launch a dialogue with the sector around the topic of mobility as a vital component of competitiveness within the sector, taking into account the consequences of the pandemic and the cost of living increase.

In September 2023, at the Vienna WAVES Festival and Conference, IMPALA elected a new board for a term of two years and reviewed the priorities of the association in the coming year. These include AI opportunities, streaming reform, fiscal support, growing the network in Central Eastern Europe and boosting sustainability and inclusion work.

Continuing its work on streaming reform, IMPALA raised concerns about the impact of a possible two-tier system involving the allocation of revenues, following proposals for reform by various streaming services.

At the end of 2023, while EU policymakers sought to reach a final agreement on the AI Act, the EU's landmark proposal to regulate AI. IMPALA called on the EU institutions to support effective transparency and record keeping obligations on AI models. After a provisional agreement was found the week after, IMPALA praised the endorsement by EU member states, and subsequently the European Parliament in early 2024.

In April 2024, IMPALA called for an end to the "value gap" for TikTok and other moment economy platforms and warned of the "unintended consequences" of proposed streaming reforms across digital service providers.

Ahead of the 2024 European Parliament Election, IMPALA joined artists and labels across Europe to call on the European Commission to come forward with a clear proposal to address the consequences of the EU “RAAP” case regarding terrestrial broadcast and public performance rights.

In April 2024, IMPALA joined the Worldwide Independent Network (WIN) in their renewed set of values as part of its ongoing work to promote the collective position of the sector in today's evolving music landscape.

In May 2024, IMPALA joined WIN's call for a joined-up approach on GenAI around key principles promoting safety, transparency, respect for copyright, a human-centered approach, ethics, and cross border consistency.

At the end of European Diversity Month in May 2024, IMPALA announced Black & Irish as the third winner of the Changemaker Award 2024. Black & Irish were recognised for their advocacy for the black community in Ireland, fostering connections within Irish society and championing anti-racist ethos.

Following Indie Week in New York, IMPALA and A2IM partnering with Julie's Bicycle launched a pilot project in June 2024 to develop the internationalisation of IMPALA's Carbon Calculator in the US. IMPALA released its first qualitative survey in the independent music sector of the business case for taking sustainability action the following month.

IMPALA welcomed the Belgian court decision to refer performer remuneration questions to the higher EU court.

After raising value gap concerns earlier that year, IMPALA opposed TikTok's attempt to boycott Merlin, flagging the importance of collective deals for diversity and consumer choice.

In autumn 2024, IMPALA received funding from strategic climate investment charity Murmur, to support its Carbon Calculator powered by Julie's Bicycle and supported by Merlin.

In December 2024, IMPALA asked regulators to block UMG's move to buy Downtown following the acquisition of PIAS Group earlier in October.

At the end of 2024, IMPALA dedicated its outstanding contribution award to Horst Weidenmüller for his outstanding contribution to the European independent music sector as CEO and founder of !K7 Music as well as founder of IMPALA's Sustainability task force.

Throughout 2025, IMPALA voiced opposition to market consolidation in the music industry, particularly Universal Music Group's proposed acquisitions of Downtown Music Holdings (including CD Baby and FUGA) and Dutch label 8Ball Music. In April 2025, IMPALA welcomed the European Commission's announcement of an investigation into UMG's proposed merger with Downtown, which also was accompanied by wider scrutiny from industry leaders and economists. IMPALA co-signed a global letter from independent music company CEOs calling for an end to further anti-competitive consolidation attempts, followed by the publication of “100 Voices”, a collective statement explaining why the acquisition should be blocked to safeguard competition and diversity. IMPALA also published a paper warning of the risks to cultural diversity posed by the deal.

In February 2025, IMPALA supported the launch of the Central and Eastern Europe (CEE) Independent Music Academy. This educational initiative was developed by national associations from Bulgaria (ANMIP), Türkiye (BMYD), Hungary (HAIL), Romania (IndieRo), and the Balkans (RUNDA). The academy provides training in key industry areas such as copyright, artist development, A&R, and marketing to strengthen independent sector capacity in the region.

In a joint initiative with global digital rights agency Merlin, IMPALA launched the Weidenmüller Sustainability Fund in 2025. Named after IMPALA co-founder and industry leader Horst Weidenmüller, the multi-year fund supports independent music companies in making their operations more environmentally sustainable, providing practical tools and financial assistance for green transformation.

In 2025, IMPALA began a collaboration with the Worldwide Independent Network (WIN) to develop a new EU co-funded networking programme. The partnership includes the rollout of WINHUB events, which aim to strengthen connections between independent music companies across Europe and provide resources for business development, policy engagement, and international growth.

In March 2025, IMPALA launched Digital Forward, an initiative to equip independent music companies with digital skills and strategies to navigate the streaming and online music environment.

In April 2025, IMPALA announced the launch of a new Artist Camp project, funded through the EU's Creative Europe programme. The initiative aims to connect independent artists across Europe, offering career development support and fostering cross-border collaboration within the EU music ecosystem. This was followed by the announcement of IMPALA's Label Camp project, also co-funded by the European Union, aimed at strengthening cross-border collaboration among independent music companies.

IMPALA awarded its 2025 Changemaker Award to the MEWEM (Mentoring programme for women entrepreneurs in the music industry) Europe initiative. Active in six EU countries, the program supports women, trans, and non-binary entrepreneurs by pairing them with experienced mentors and offering structured training. The award recognises MEWEM's impact on diversity and innovation in the music sector.

IMPALA's Remuneration Playbook was published in May 2025, setting out twelve policy recommendations aimed at improving revenues for artists and producers and promoting diversity in the music sector.

In June 2025, IMPALA launched a new EU-funded support scheme to foster change-making initiatives across the independent music sector, promoting innovation, diversity, and sustainability. IMPALA saw the publication of a new report by industry experts Dan Fowler and Katherine Bassett entitled “Combating the Emergence of a Two-Tier Music Streaming Market“., warning that scale advantages were threatening diversity and calling for urgent policy action.

IMPALA also joined the #StayTrueToTheAct campaign in July 2025, urging EU policymakers to ensure that the AI Act protects creators through transparency, consent, and safeguards.

On the five-year anniversary of the RAAP ruling in September 2025, IMPALA joined other European music bodies and MEPs in calling for concrete solutions to ensure equitable treatment of performers and producers.

Ahead of the fifth anniversary of IMPALA's EDI charter, the pilot Equity, Diversity, and Inclusion (EDI) Toolkit was launched by IMPALA in late September 2025, providing resources for independent music companies to embed EDI principles in their operations.

IMPALA held its first European Independent Music Summit in Zagreb in October 2025, coinciding with its Annual General Meeting and the election of a new executive board.

In November 2025, to celebrate IMPALA’s 25th Anniversary, IMPALA released Faces of the Independent Sector, a new Europe-wide storytelling campaign highlighting the people who drive the independent music ecosystem. IMPALA also introduced some other features, such as special editions of their awards.

At the start of 2026, IMPALA delivers a keynote at Eurosonic Noorderslag, calling on the EU music sector to stand up for culture, competition, AI accountability and European sovereignty in the face of growing market concentration.

IMPALA published a new report by industry expert Dan Fowler highlighting the strategic importance of a culturally diverse and independent European music ecosystem.

In February 2026, after 14 months since the deal was announced, IMPALA responds to the European Commission’s decision on UMG’s acquisition of Downtown, highlighting key conclusions for competition, cultural diversity and independent distribution.

IMPALA also welcomed the proposal for an increased European Union budget for culture in the next EU budget cycle and for the creation of a dedicated music strand within the proposed AgoraEU programme.

During European Diversity Month in 2026, IMPALA Launched an equity, diversity and inclusion (EDI) toolkit and survey aimed at helping music businesses benchmark performance, access training and set internal targets.

In May, IMPALA proposed an industrial policy approach to culture, including a business plan, measurable targets, coordinated strategy, and annual progress reporting.

In 2025, IMPALA launched the Digital Music Plan, setting out proposals to reform the digital music market. Published as global music streaming approached one billion subscribers, the plan advocated measures to strengthen competition, transparency, fairness, and cultural diversity in the digital music ecosystem.

== Members ==
As of 2025, IMPALA has nearly 6000 members, including national associations as well independent music companies as direct members. The Board is elected by its members.

=== Labels ===
- Beggars Group
- Better Noise Music
- Blue Sun
- Cosmos Music Group
- Despotz Records
- Edel AG
- Epitaph
- Everlasting Records
- GMI
- I love you Records
- !K7 Records
- Musikvertrieb
- Playground Music Scandinavia
- Pomitni
- Red Bullet Productions
- SCL / Lusitanian
- Sugar Music
- Sundance Records
- The state51 Conspiracy
- United We Fly
- Wagram Music
- Zebralution

=== National associations ===
- AIM (UK)
- AIM Ireland (Ireland)
- AMAEI (Portugal)
- ANPM (Poland)
- ANMIP (Bulgaria)
- BIMA (Belgium)
- BMYD (Turkey)
- DUP (Denmark)
- FELIN (France)
- FONO (Norway)
- HAIL (Hungary)
- HERMES (Greece)
- INDIECO (Finland)
- INDIERO (Romania)
- IndieSuisse (Switzerland)
- P.I.L. (Israel)
- Platforma (Czech Republic)
- PMI (Italy)
- RUNDA (Balkans)
- SPILNA (Ukraine)
- SOM (Sweden)
- STOMP (Netherlands)
- UFI (Spain)
- UPFI (France)
- VTMÖ (Austria)
- VUT (Germany)

== Awards ==
IMPALA has four awards schemes: the 100 Artists to Watch Award, the Outstanding Contribution Award, the Changemaker Award and the IMPALA Sales Awards.
