= Chris William Sanchirico =

American legal and economic scholar

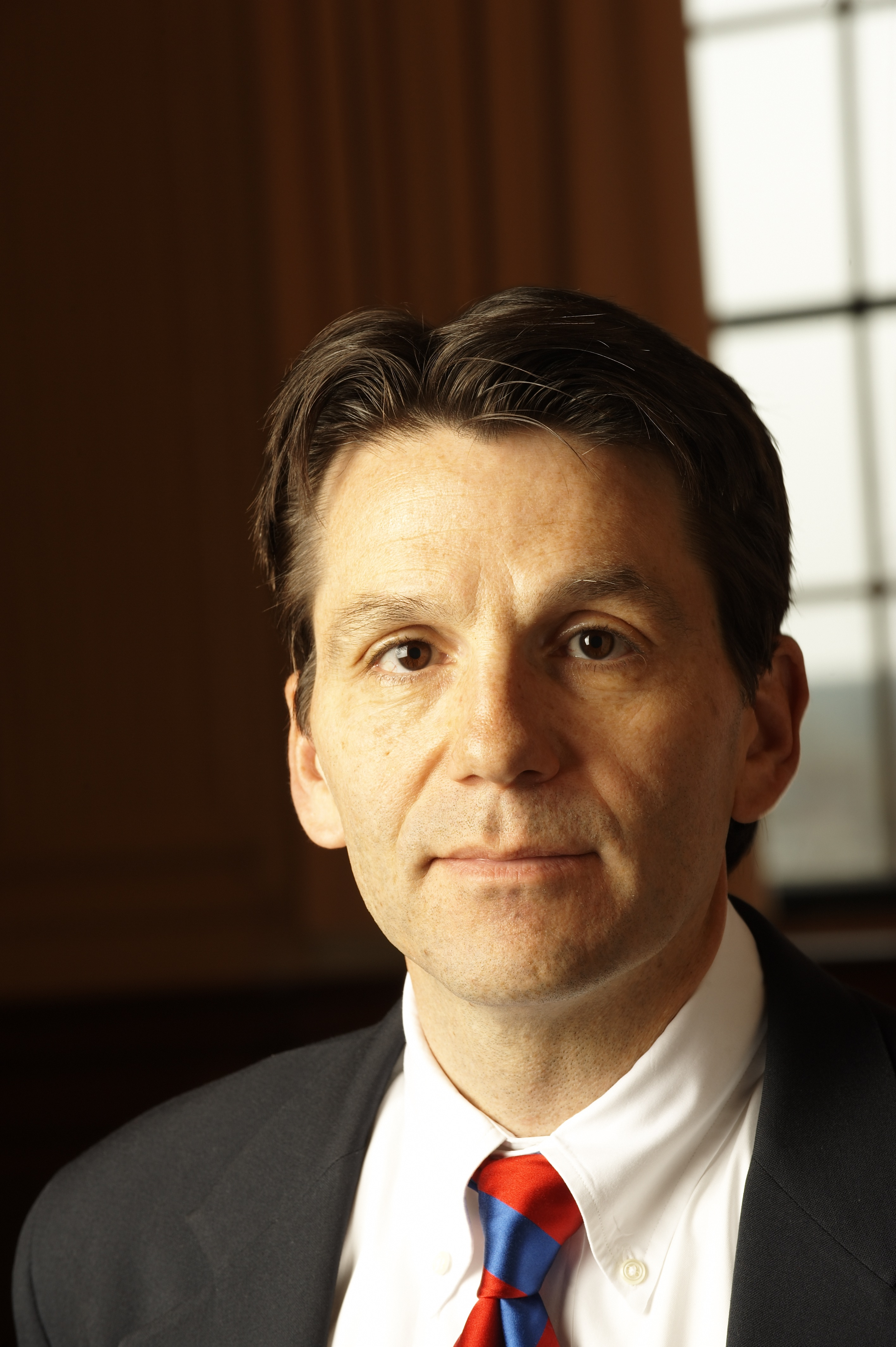
- Sanchirico in 2009
- Occupation: Law professor
- Title: Professor of Law; Samuel A. Blank Professor of Law, Business and Public Policy, Emeritus

Academic background
- Education: Yale University; Yale Law School; Princeton University
- Thesis: A Probabilistic Theory of Learning in Games (1994)

Academic work
- Institutions: Penn Law and Wharton

Chris William Sanchirico is Professor of Law and Emeritus Samuel A. Blank Professor of Law, Business and Public Policy at the University of Pennsylvania Carey Law School. He is an expert on law, economics, and tax policy.

== Biography ==
Sanchirico was born in the Bronx, New York and grew up in Wayne, New Jersey where he attended the Wayne public schools. His paternal grandparents immigrated to the United States from Basilicata, Italy, a region whose contemporaneous poverty and backwardness are depicted in Carlo Levi's classic memoir, Cristo si è fermato a Eboli (1945).

== Education ==
Sanchirico graduated with an A.B. from the School of Public and International Affairs at Princeton University in 1984. He was named one of two Woodrow Wilson Scholars in his senior year. He earned his J.D. at Yale Law School and his Ph.D. (in economics) at Yale University, where his studies focused on game theory, mathematical economics, and public economics. His dissertation on game theory was published in one of the field’s leading journals, Econometrica.

== Professional career ==
Sanchirico's research and teaching combine mathematical and legal-institutional sophistication to a degree that is relatively rare among economists and legal scholars. He has published extensively in preeminent journals in the fields of tax law and policy, evidence, procedure, law and economics, public economics, game theory, and mathematical economics. He has presented his work widely at law schools, economics departments, business schools, and statistics departments. His course offerings include Federal Income Taxation, Taxation of Business Entities, International Taxation, Evidence, Game Theory (Ph.D. level), Intermediate Microeconomics, Mathematical Methods (Ph.D. level), and Law and Economics.

In 2009 Sanchirico visited Università di Bologna where he was visiting scholar at La Facoltà di Economia, senior fellow at Istituto di Studi Avanzati, and Erasmus Mundus Scholar. Sanchirico has served as the chair of the Evidence Section of the Association of American Law Schools and a member of the board of directors of the American Law and Economics Association. Sanchirico is the founding co-director of the University of Pennsylvania’s Center for Tax Law and Policy. He is also the founding editor of two eJournals, Evidence and Evidentiary Procedure and Economic Inequality and the Law, and an advisory editor of the University of Bologna Law Review, a general student-edited law journal published by the department of legal studies of the University of Bologna.

== Selected publications ==
=== Tax law and policy: institutional ===
As American as Apple Inc.: International Tax and Ownership Nationality, 68 Tax Law Review 207, (2015)
The Tax Advantage to Paying Private Equity Fund Managers With Profit Shares: What is it? Why is it Bad? 75 University of Chicago Law Review 1071 (2008)
The New US Tax Preference for 'Foreign-Derived Intangible Income' 71 Tax Law Review 625 (2018)
Earnings Stripping under the BEAT, 73 Tax Law Review 301, (2020)
A Game-theoretic Analysis of Global Minimum Tax Design: Country-by-country v. Global Averaging, U of Penn, Inst for Law & Econ Research Paper No. 22-19 (2022)
Should A Global Minimum Tax by Country-by-country? Tax Notes Federal, Vol. 175, pp. 549-558, April 25, 2022
Circular Partnerships, U of Penn, Inst for Law & Econ Research Paper No. 23-46 (2023) (with Reed Shuldiner)
Deferring Income with Tiered and Circular Partnerships, U of Penn, Inst for Law & Econ Research Paper No. 24-28 (2024) (with Reed Shuldiner)

=== Tax law and policy: a critical look at the theory of "optimal taxation" ===
A Critical Look at the Economic Argument for Taxing Only Labor Income, 63 Tax Law Review 867 867 (2010)
A Counter-Reply to Bankman and Weisbach, 64 Tax Law Review 551 (2011)
Tax Eclecticism, 64 Tax Law Review 149 (2011)
Optimal Tax Policy and the Symmetries of Ignorance, 66 Tax Law Review 1 (2016)
Inequality and Uncertainty: Theory and Legal Applications, 155 University of Pennsylvania Law Review 279 (2006) (with Matthew D. Adler)
Taxes versus Legal Rules as Instruments for Equity: A More Equitable View, 29 Journal of Legal Studies 797 (2000)
Why the Optimal Long-Run Tax Rate on Capital is Zero…or Very High: The Missing Explanation, U of Penn, Inst for Law & Econ Research Paper No. 20-33 (2020), forthcoming Florida Tax Review
The Ramsey Rule at 100: Paring Back the Overgrowth, U of Penn, Inst for Law & Econ Research Paper No. 21-25 (2021)

=== Legal evidence and procedure ===
Evidence, Procedure, and the Upside of Cognitive Error, 57 Stanford Law Review 291 (2004)
Character Evidence and the Object of Trial, 101 Columbia Law Review 1227 (2001)
Detection Avoidance, 81 NYU Law Review 1331 (2006)
Evidence Tampering, 53 Duke Law Journal 1215 (2004)

=== Game theory and probability ===
A Probabilistic Model of Learning in Games, 64 Econometrica 1375 (1996)
Collusion and Price Rigidity, 71 Review of Economic Studies 317 (2004) (with Susan Athey & Kyle Bagwell)
The Role of Absolute Continuity in Merging of Opinions and Rational Learning, 29 1/2 Games and Economic Behavior 170, (with Ronald I. Miller)
