= Kansas Smitty's House Band =

London-based music group

Kansas Smitty's House Band is a London-based group that specialises in original jazz music. The band run their own bar on Broadway Market in Hackney, located in the London Borough of Hackney.

== History ==
Kansas Smitty’s House Band was formed in 2013 by Jack Abraham and Giacomo Smith. The band are a 7-piece group who describe themselves as ‘a group of jazz-addicted twenty-somethings who run their own bar’

The current line up is:

Pete Horsfall- trumpet

Giacomo Smith- alto sax

Alec Harper- tenor sax

Joe Webb- piano

David Archer- guitar

Ferg Ireland- bass

Will Cleasby- drums

Past members:

Reuben James- piano

Ruben Fox- tenor sax

Adrian Cox- clarinet

Pedro Segundo- drums

Theon Cross- tuba

The band has collaborated extensively with Lewis Durham of Kitty, Daisy & Lewis. In 2018 the band has planned collaborations with Curtis Stigers, Lewis Durham, and Shingai Shoniwa.

== Notable appearances ==
The band has performed at venues such as Ronnie Scott’s, Wilderness Festival, Jazz Café, Vortex Jazz Club, Shoreditch Town Hall, Rough Trade and the Vaults Festival. They have also hosted their own Mardi Gras events in 2014, 2015, 2016 and 2017 and have produced their own events at The Peckham Liberal Club and the Dalston Pond.

The band has appeared on BBC Radio London, BBC Radio 2, BBC Radio 3 and BBC Radio 6, including twice on BBC Radio 2’s Friday Night is Music Night.

== Kansas Smitty’s Bar ==
In 2015, Kansas Smitty’s House Band realised they needed a home for their music, and so, set up Kansas Smitty’s on Hackney’s Broadway Market. This intimate basement bar is a rehearsal space for the band as well as a live music venue. A musical community has been built around the bar which offers musicians such as Reuben James (pianist on Sam Smith’s world tour), Howe Gelb, Louis Cole, Bruno Major, Howard Alden and Joe Stilgoe. Kansas Smitty’s has received positive reviews in a number of publications, including the Evening Standard, Design My Night and the Hackney Gazette

== Critical reception ==
The band has been awarded four stars in articles in The Times and been reviewed in the Evening Standard.

Their debut album was included in the Daily Telegraph's 50 Best Jazz Albums of 2015 and was included in The Arts Desk review of the best new vinyl in 2015.

Their music has been played on Jamie Cullum's and Clare Teal's BBC Radio 2 shows and was broadcast live from Cheltenham Jazz Festival on Cerys Matthews' BBC Radio 6 Music show earlier this year.

Food critic, journalist, and author, Jay Rayner, is a supporter of the band and wrote the liner notes on their most recent album, Kansas Smitty's Live. He performed with the band at their London Jazz Festival performance at Shoreditch Town Hall in 2016.

== Discography ==
Year	Catalogue number	Title	Format	Playtime
2014	KS001	‘The Band’s Been Drinking/Kansas Smitty’s’	7-inch 45 rpm vinyl	7 min
2015	KS002	Kansas Smitty's	12-inch 33 rpm vinyl, CD, digital	38 min
2016	KS003	Kansas Smitty's Live	CD, digital	39 min
2017 (projected November)	KS004	Movin' On	In production	
2018	KS005	Broadway 2018	CD, digital	37 min
