= Martin Mills =

British businessman

- Born: 12 May 1949 (age 76); Aylesbury, Buckinghamshire, England
- Years active: 1973–present
- Known for: Beggars Group

Martin Mills (born 12 May 1949) is the founder and chairman of the Beggars Group.

== Early life ==
Mills grew up near Aylesbury, Buckinghamshire and comes from an "upper-middle-class English family". His father worked as a civil servant and his mother was a teacher and headmistress. Mills attended Magdalen College School and Oriel College, Oxford University, where he studied Philosophy, politics and economics, graduating in 1970.

After graduating from university, Mills worked for the Office of Population Censuses and Surveys, writing reports on abortion law reformation and processing abortion statistics; however, the experience left him wanting "to do something completely different". After leaving, he found a job at the Record and Tape Exchange, a secondhand record shop in Shepherd's Bush, where Mills realised his future was in the music industry. Eventually, Mills opened a record shop of his own, based on the idea of creating a "new kind of record shop which sold new and second hand records side by side", and began promoting concerts.

== Beggars Group ==
The record store was opened initially to re-sell records that he and a friend, Nick Austin, had collected for a mobile disco. The disco, and then the company, was named after the Rolling Stones' album Beggars Banquet. Mills and Austin had seen an opportunity for a record shop that sold both new and second-hand records. Beggars Banquet soon became a six-shop chain in London, arriving shortly before punk broke through; "It turned what we did upside down. We all started being interested in a completely different style of music. The kind of concerts we had been promoting suddenly became completely irrelevant, so we started promoting punk gigs instead. It was an amazing, incredibly exciting sea change."

In the radio show he was quoted as saying that The whole point [of independent music publishing] is not giving people what they want but what they are going to want.

Having served on the BPI (British Phonographic Industry) Council, the governing body of the record industry, from 1987 to 2000, he quit to become the progenitor of the Association of Independent Music in the UK, and similar bodies in Europe (Impala) and the US (A2IM), and the Worldwide Independent Network.

He also led the establishment of Merlin in 2008, the independents’ rights licensing body, which has distributed well over $2 billion to members since launch, and today counts 850 members from 63 countries.

He has remained active in other music industry organisations, through his participation in the government’s Music Industry Forum, the Music Business Forum, being on the board of UK Music, and both as a director of PPL and VPL, the industry’s rights licensing bodies. In addition, he was called by the US Senate to Washington in 2012 to be a witness in the hearing on the proposed purchase of EMI Records by Universal Music.

He was awarded an MBE in the 2008 New Year Honours list, as well as outstanding contribution awards from Music Week, Billboard, the Radio Academy, the Featured Artists Coalition, IMPALA, Canadian Music Week, The Music Producers’ Guild, A2IM, Billboard, and the 'Pioneer Award' at the AIM Awards.

He has a personal fortune of £230 million. A Beggars Group sale of their stake in Spotify in 2019 earned Mills £8 million.

As of 2023, the labels that comprise the Beggars Group are 4AD, Matador Records, Rough Trade Records, XL Recordings and Young.

== Awards and accolades ==
- 1998: The Strat award, Music Week
- 2008: Honoured by The Queen with an MBE
- 2011: Industry Champion Award at the inaugural Artist & Manager Awards
- 2011: The Guardian – Inaugural Music Power 100 list
- 2011: Impala Outstanding Contribution Award
- 2012: Inaugural Lifetime Achievement award by A2IM
- 2012: Music Producers Guild Outstanding Contribution to UK Music Award
- 2013: Billboard - Industry Icon award
- 2013: Billboard - Power 100
- 2014: The Inaugural Global Impact Award at Canadian Music Week
- 2014: Pioneer Award at the AIM Independent Music Awards
- 2014: Billboard - International Power Player
- 2014: Billboard - Power 100
- 2015: Billboard - Power 100
- 2016: Billboard - Power 100
- 2017: Billboard - Power 100
- 2017: Billboard - Indie Power Player
- 2018: Billboard - Indie Power Player
- 2018: Variety International Music Leader
- 2019: Billboard - Power 100
- 2019: Billboard - Indie Power Player
- 2019: Variety - International Music Leader
- 2020: Billboard - Indie Power Player
- 2020: Billboard - Power 100
- 2021: Billboard - Indie Power Player
- 2022: Billboard - Indie Power Player
- 2022: Billboard - Power List
- 2022: Variety - Variety 500
- 2023: Billboard - Power 100
- 2024: Billboard - Indie Power Player
- 2025: Billboard - Global Power Player

== Commentary ==
In June 2013, Mills was described in a BBC Radio 4 portrait as looking "remarkably unremarkable" but being "like a wise old fisherman watching minnows waiting to catch a really big fish".
