= Union des Producteurs Phonographiques Français Indépendants =

French trade organisation

UPFI
- Formation: 12 June 1986 (40 years ago)
- Headquarters: Paris, France
- President: Vincent Frèrebeau
- Director-general: Jérôme Roger
- Website: www.upfi.fr
- Formerly called: APPI

The Union of Independent French Phonographic Producers (French: Union des Producteurs Phonographiques Français Indépendants; UPFI) is a trade organisation that brings together independent record labels and music distributors in France. Its headquarters are based in the nation's capital Paris.

Founded on 12 June 1986 as the Professional Association of Independent Phonographic Producers (French: Association Professionelle des Producteurs Phonographiques Indépendants; APPI), the organisation changed the terms of its original statutes during its extraordinary general meeting of 8 June 1993. It was during the same meeting that the organisation changed its name to the UPFI.

== Structure ==
In its current constitution, the UPFI says its current objectives are:

- to bring together and represent all persons or entities practising the profession of producers, publishers of sound and video recordings, and all those whose activities are linked with the production of these sound and video recordings;
- to organise, educate and protect their professional, economic, moral, national and international interests;
- generally, to do everything possible to ensure the promotion of production activities, and that of its members in particular, in France and abroad.

The UPFI is currently headed by its president Vincent Frèrebeau, who was elected during an annual general meeting held on 5 June 2014. He took over from Stephan Bourdoiseau, who headed the organisation from June 2004 to June 2008, and had taken over from Frèrebeau himself in June 2010 for a second term.

== Notable members ==
- Actes Sud
- Because Music
- CH+
- Delphine Records
- Discorama
- Happy Music
- IDOL
- Keltia Musique
- Lusafrica
- Naïve Records
- No Format!
- Outhere
- Panorama/AB Disques
- Peermusic
- PIAS
- Rue Bleue
- Tôt ou tard
- Wagram Music

== Presidents ==
The UPFI has been headed by five different presidents since June 1993.

- Claude Berda: 1993–1997
- Jean-Michel Fava: 1997–2000
- Patrick Zelnik: 2000–2004
- Stephan Bourdoiseau: 2004–2008, 2010–2014
- Vincent Frèrebeau: 2008–2010, 2014–present

== Certification ==
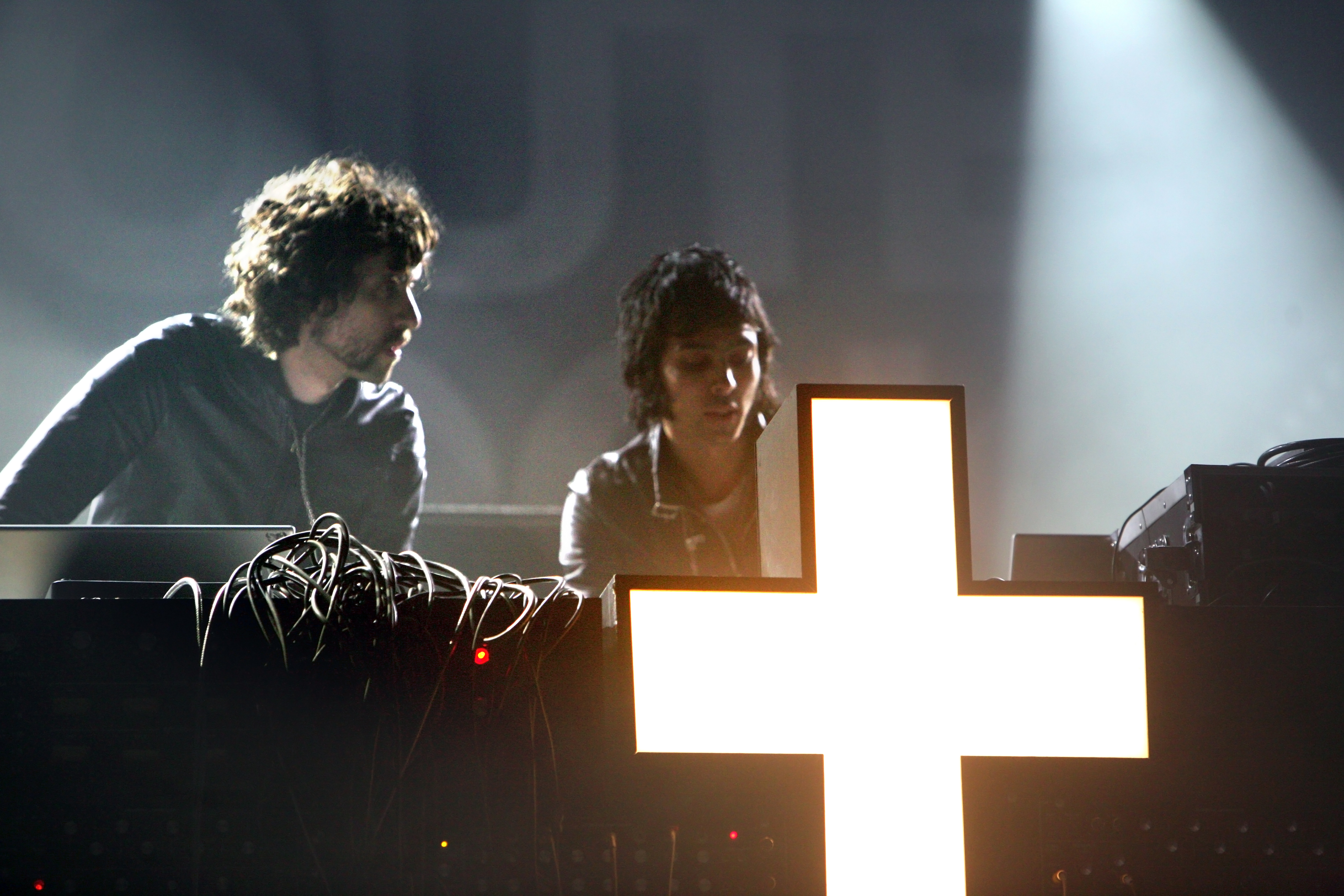
Since 2010, French electronic duo Justice has been the only recipient of a triple platinum certification from the UPFI, after sales for the music video of their song "Civilization" reached 45,000 copies in 2011.

The UPFI awards certifications at the request of each phonographic society. The submission of a certification is subject to a sales threshold, which must be certified by the organisation's accounting firm after audits with the label. As of 1 July 2009, the certification criteria are as follows:

Type	Thresholds per award				
Type	Gold	Platinum	2× Platinum	3× Platinum	Diamond
Single	150,000	250,000	—N/a		400,000
Album	50,000	100,000	200,000	300,000	500,000
Music video	7,500	15,000	30,000	45,000	60,000
