= ConventionCamp =

Coordinates: 52.323314°N 9.809718°E

Convention Camp is a conference on digital future, social media and web culture. It takes place annually since 2008 at Hanover fairground and is the largest BarCamp in Germany.

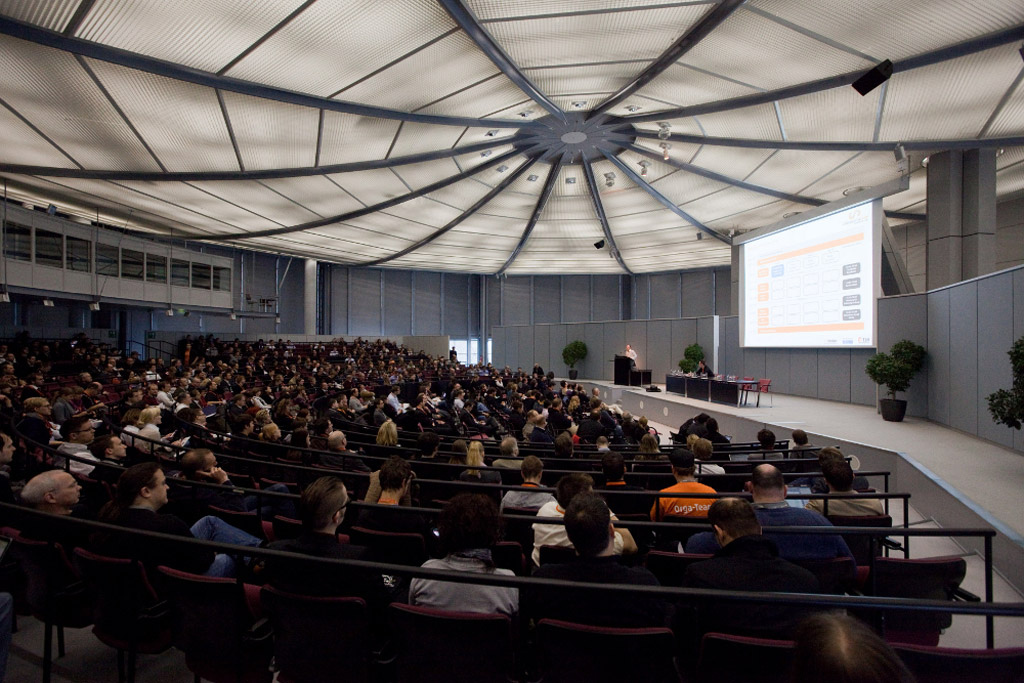
Convention Camp held at Hanover fairground in 2011

== History ==
The Convention Camp was launched in 2008 by the publisher yeebase media and the web agency w3design. The first event was held on October 2, 2008, at the University of Hanover. It initially focused knowledge management and social media software for companies in the foreground.

The second event was held on November 26, 2009. Beginning 2010, the Institute for Marketing and Management of the University of Hannover supports the ConventionCamp.

On November 8, 2011, the fourth ConventionCamp took place. In the background of Stuttgart 21 and Occupy Wall Street, focus of the program was the relationship of society and the Internet. A total of 1,500 visitors attended the conference. In the evening the t3n Web Awards were awarded for the best German websites in several categories.

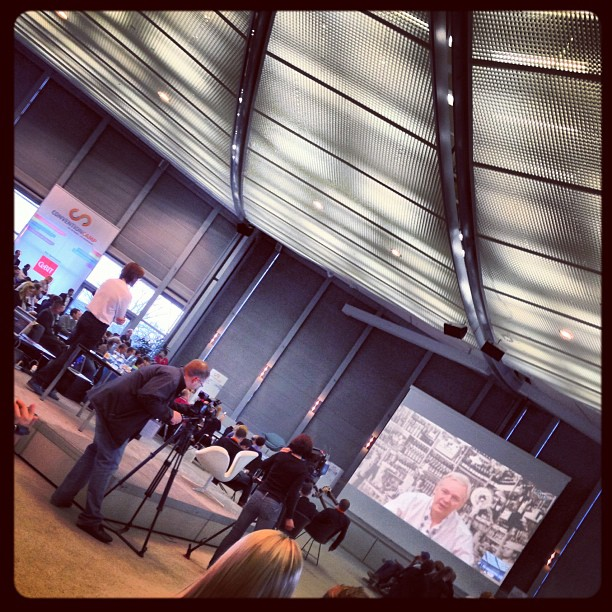
2012, Julian Assange has taken part by videoconference

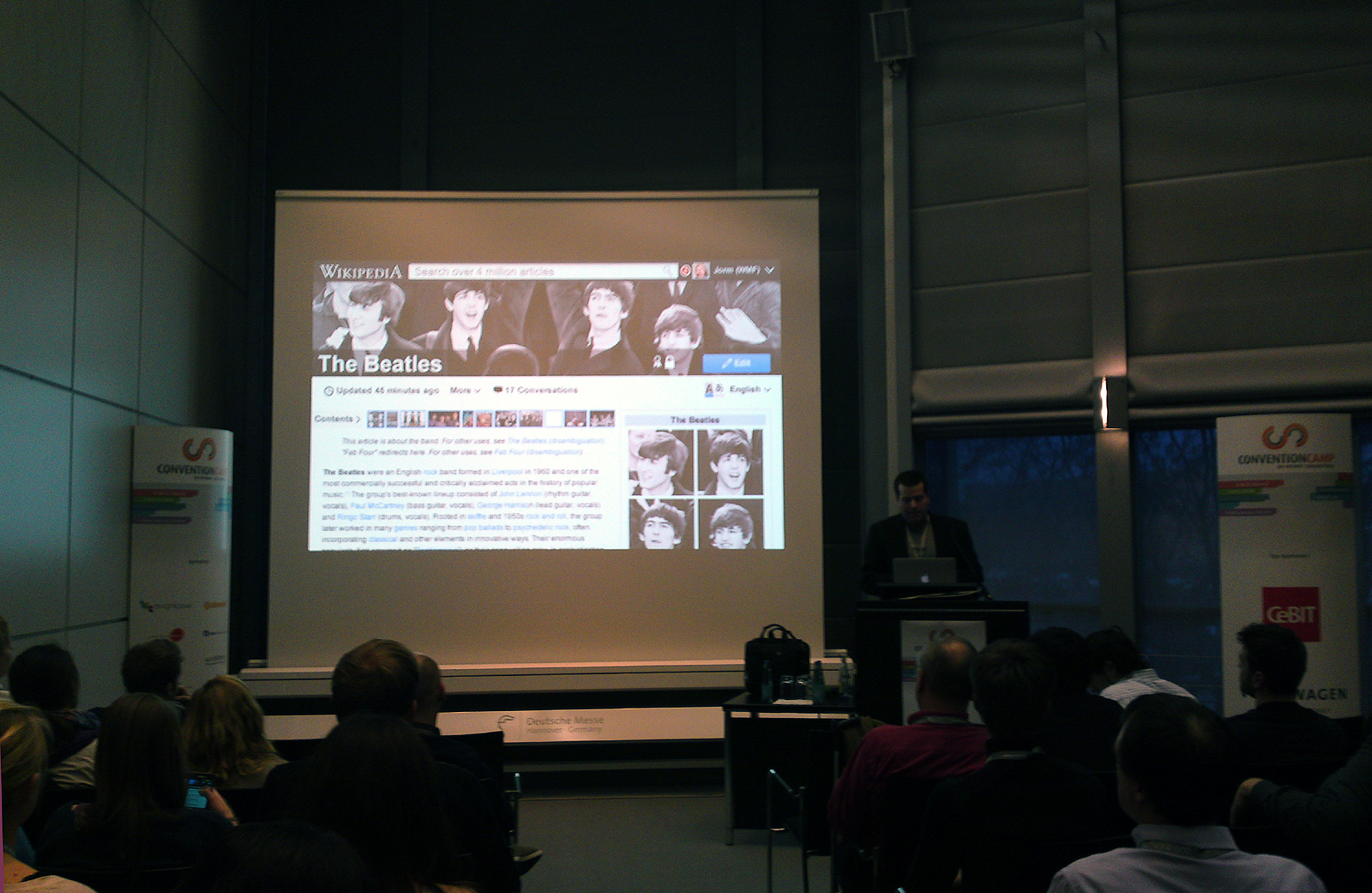
2012: Using the article of The Beatles there had been the question of the Wikipedias in the future

In 2012, Julian Assange has taken part by videoconference. In other sessions for example speaker Markus Franz posed the question of the Wikipedias in the future.

== Notability ==
The Convention Camp is a mix of classic conference with fixed program and unconference where early visitors can submit their own proposals. With 1,500 participants, the last ConventionCamp is currently (as of September 2012) the largest BarCamp and after the re:publica the second largest conference on Internet issues in Germany. The topics discussed at the event reach a wide reception in the trade press, including the participation of prominent speakers contribute.

The ConventionCamp or its initiators were awarded in March 2011 with the so-called LIDA Award. The abbreviation LIDA stands for Leader in the Digital Age, patron of the award was the Lower Saxony Minister of Economics Jörg Bode.
