= IDOL (company) =

French music distribution company

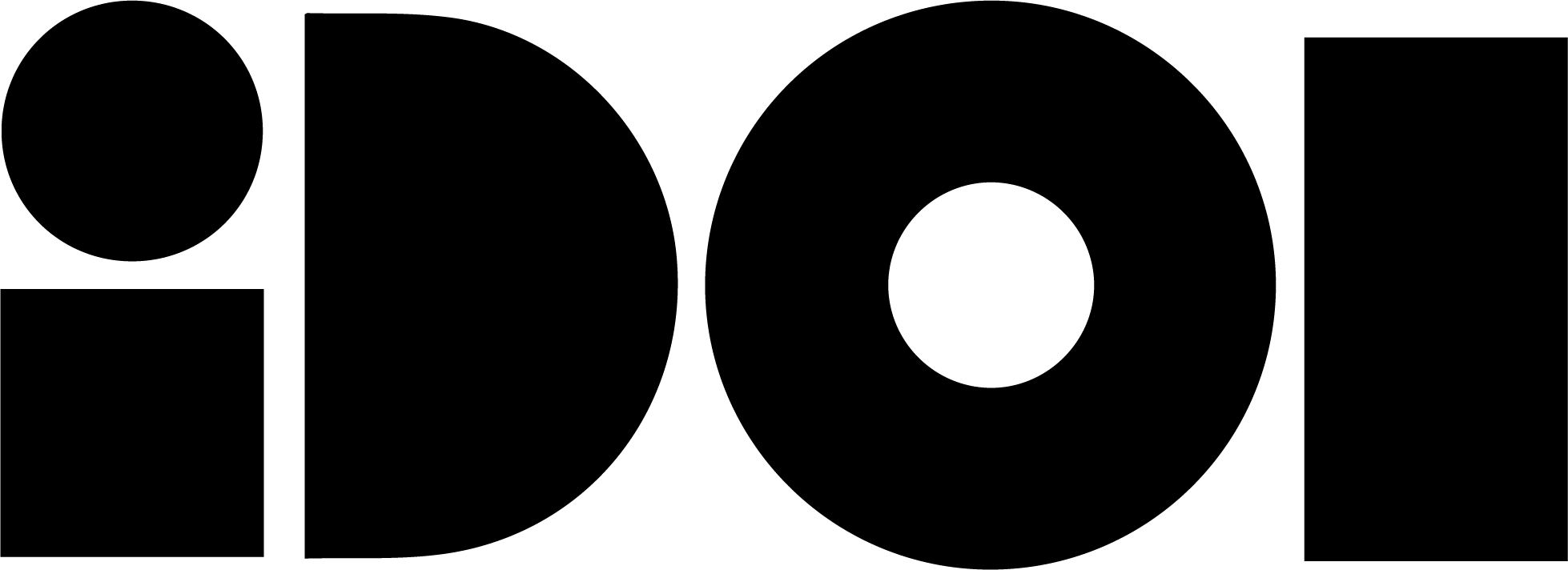
- Type: Private
- Industry: Digital music distribution
- Founded: 2006
- Founder: Pascal Bittard
- Headquarters: Paris, France
- Area served: Worldwide
- Key people: Pascal Bittard (Founder & CEO)
- Products: Music distribution, Labelcamp (SaaS platform)
- Services: Digital distribution, analytics, rights management
- Website: www.idol.io

IDOL (stylized as IDOL; acronym for Independent Distribution OnLine) is a French music distribution company founded in February 2006 by Pascal Bittard in Paris. The company specializes in digital distribution services across all major platforms, including Spotify, Apple Music, YouTube, and Amazon, for independent record labels and artists.

== History ==
In February 2006, Pascal Bittard established IDOL in Paris. Just a year later, in 2007, the company became the first digital distributor for the Atmosphériques, Dreyfus Jazz, and Kitsuné Musique labels. In 2009, IDOL launched Labelcamp, the world's first tool to provide daily monitoring of digital distribution activity.

IDOL began its international expansion in 2014 by opening an office in London. The following year, the company partnered with PIAS for physical distribution in France. In 2016, the company entered the United States market with offices in New York, Nashville, and Los Angeles, and in 2017 it opened a branch in Johannesburg, South Africa.

In 2018, IDOL was among the first distributors to campaign for the "user-centric" revenue model alongside Deezer.

From 2019 through 2024, IDOL achieved and maintained "preferred partner" status with Apple Music, Spotify, and YouTube. In 2020, it established a branch in Berlin, Germany and launched Getup, a playlist website that combines a streaming platform with the editorial direction of a music magazine. In 2023 and 2024, Pascal Bittard was named one of Billboard's "100 International Power Players." In 2025, IDOL received a nomination for Distributor of the Year at the Libera Awards.

== Activities ==
IDOL provides tailored digital distribution and marketing services to independent labels and artists. Its catalogue includes partnerships with labels such as Erased Tapes, Fire Records, City Slang, Mexican Summer, Glitterbeat, Gondwana, Kitsuné, Local Action, Soundway, SRD, and Ubisoft. Through these labels, IDOL distributes releases by artists including Four Tet, Caribou, Daphni, L'Impératrice, Jessica Pratt, Hania Rani, Kiasmos, Rone, and Rim'K.

The company also works directly with entrepreneurial artists such as Erick The Architect, TOKiMONSTA, La Femme, Yemi Alade, Étienne de Crécy, and Ibrahim Maalouf.

Its Labelcamp platform offers digital logistics, marketing tools, and data analytics, and is available in SaaS mode via API to other distributors and labels, including PIAS Group, Because Music, and Ditto Music.

As of 2024, IDOL employs around 70 people.
