= Beggars Group =

British record company

Coordinates: 51.4585°N 0.1854°W

- Founded: 1977
- Founder: Martin Mills
- Distributor: PIAS (UK, Benelux) Redeye (U.S.) Hostess (Japan) FAB Distribution (Canada) Wagram (France)
- Genre: Various
- Country of origin: United Kingdom
- Location: London (company headquarters) New York City
- Official website: www.beggars.com archive.beggars.com www.beggarsgroup.ca www.beggarsgroup.de www.beatink.com

Beggars Group is a British record company, founded by Martin Mills, that owns or holds stakes in various record labels, including 4AD, Rough Trade Records, Matador Records, XL Recordings, and Young.

== History ==
The company had its origins in the Beggars Banquet record shops, which first opened in 1973 in Earls Court, London. In 1977, inspired by the DIY aesthetics of the British punk rock movement, which was at the height of its popularity, the shop founders decided to form an independent label and release records as Beggars Banquet Records. This became the group's flagship label and name.

The first band on the label was English punk group The Lurkers; the first ever release on the label was The Lurkers' "Shadow"/ "Love Story" 7-inch single. Later in the decade and into the early 1980s, hits from Tubeway Army and Gary Numan confirmed the label's status in the industry. Beggars Banquet later released music by Bauhaus, Biffy Clyro, Buffalo Tom, The Charlatans, The Cult, The Fall, The Go-Betweens, The National, St. Vincent and Tindersticks.

In August 2002, it was announced that Beggars Group had purchased a 50% stake in Matador Records. In July 2007, it was reported that Beggars had purchased Rough Trade Records.

The company owned a stake in Spotify, but sold their shares in 2019. Although the full amount received was never disclosed, half of the earnings were distributed amongst the label's artists, while £8m went to Martin Mills.

== Ownership ==
The Beggars Group has been in business for over forty years and is owned and managed by Martin Mills. As of 2017, the main labels that form the group are 4AD, Matador Records, Rough Trade Records, XL Recordings, and Young. The company owns 4AD (the label itself a Beggars Banquet imprint) outright, and retains a 50% stake in each of the others. Older labels within the group, including Beggars Banquet itself and Too Pure, are now part of Beggars Arkive, which is the catalogue department for its labels that are no longer active.

XL is a major owner of the Rough Trade Shops chain, where Beggars directors own shares and oversee control.

== Current group artists ==
The main labels that constitute the Beggars Group are home to a range of artists, including:

4AD

- Adrianne Lenker
- Aldous Harding
- Anjimile
- Atlas Sound
- Bartees Strange
- Becky and the Birds
- Big Thief
- Bing & Ruth
- Buck Meek
- cumgirl8
- Daughter
- Deerhunter
- Dry Cleaning
- Erika de Casier
- Ex:Re
- Future Islands
- HAWA
- Helado Negro
- Holly Herndon
- Jenny Hval
- Lucinda Chua
- Maria Somerville
- SOHN
- The Breeders
- The Golden Dregs
- The National
- Tkay Maidza
- Tune-Yards
- U.S. Girls
- Velvet Negroni

Matador Records

- Algiers
- Bar Italia
- Belle and Sebastian
- Butthole Surfers
- Car Seat Headrest
- Circuit des Yeux
- Darkside
- Desert Sessions
- Gang of Four
- Horsegirl
- Julien Baker
- Kim Gordon
- King Krule
- Lifeguard
- Lucy Dacus
- Mdou Moctar
- Muzz
- Pavement
- Perfume Genius
- Queens of the Stone Age
- Snail Mail
- Spoon
- Stephen Malkmus
- Steve Gunn
- Water from Your Eyes
- Yo La Tengo

Rough Trade Records

- A. Savage
- Alabama Shakes
- Amyl and the Sniffers
- ANOHNI
- Arthur Russell
- Augustus Pablo
- Black Midi
- Dean Blunt
- Benjamin Booker
- Caroline
- Jarvis Cocker
- Delays
- Gilla Band
- Goat Girl
- The Hidden Cameras
- JARV IS...
- Jockstrap
- Lankum
- Lisa O'Neill
- The Long Blondes
- Parquet Courts
- Pinegrove
- Scritti Politti
- Sea Power
- Sleaford Mods
- SOAK
- Special Interest
- This Is the Kit
- Warpaint

XL Recordings

- Arca
- BADBADNOTGOOD
- Blawan
- Burial
- CASISDEAD
- Charlotte Day Wilson
- Everything Is Recorded
- Fabiana Palladino
- Fontaines D.C.
- Ibeyi
- Jai Paul
- John FM
- Joy Orbison
- Kenny Beats
- King Krule
- LSDXOXO
- Makaya McCraven
- M.I.A.
- Not Dvr
- Nourished by Time
- Overmono
- Peggy Gou
- Radiohead
- Sam Morton
- Skiifall
- Smerz
- The Smile
- Thom Yorke

Young

- James William Blades
- Ethan P. Flynn
- Jamie xx
- Koreless
- Mustafa
- Oliver Sim
- Robyn
- Romy
- Sampha
- The xx
