= Another Version of the Truth =

Video by Nine Inch Nails
- Released: December 25, 2009
- Recorded: December 5, 2008 – December 13, 2008
- Genres: Industrial rock, industrial metal, dark ambient
- Length: 134 minutes (Las Vegas); 137 minutes (The Gift)
- Label: Self-released
- Director: "The NIN fan community"

Nine Inch Nails chronology
Beside You in Time (2007)	Another Version of the Truth (2009)

Another Version of the Truth was an independently released live concert video documenting Nine Inch Nails' 2008 Lights in the Sky tour made available throughout late 2009/early 2010 on Blu-ray, DVD, and various other online formats. Another Version of the Truth is also the title of an instrumental track on Nine Inch Nails' 2007 album Year Zero. The video is a 3-disc set bringing together numerous editors, designers, and web programmers to create a professional digital film, followed by a physical release created "by fans for fans".

The project is supposed to be "strictly not for profit" and shared for free. Because the set was an unofficial release created independently by fans, it does not have a Halo number, but chronologically falls between Halo 27 and Halo 28.

== Background ==
This One Is On Us is a global multimedia organization that inspires the public to document, and create lasting mementos of their live music experience.

Nine Inch Nails frontman Trent Reznor had originally intended to film the entirety of three shows of the Lights in the Sky Tour in 3-D, using James Cameron's 3-D team, for release on what would have been the act's last live album. Due to Interscope Records pulling out at the last minute, the project could not be completed., and thus This One Is On Us decided to create its own single DVD release of the band's final performance in Las Vegas on December 13, 2008. However, footage of over 400 GB worth of video from the band's following shows in Victoria (December 5), Portland (December 7), and Sacramento (December 12) was nevertheless shot by "a mysterious, shadowy group of subversives" and unofficially distributed via BitTorrent on January 7, 2009 as a Christmas/New Year gift from Reznor to fans for them to do as they wished. In an immediate response to Reznor's announcement of his abandoned project, This One Is On Us quickly downloaded the data and had begun to assemble the footage into a full-length concert film, to twin with the previously made Vegas disc. After a round of voting, Another Version of the Truth was chosen to be the project title. continuing the tradition of naming Nine Inch Nails concert videos after a certain song for its associated album (And All That Could Have Been, and Beside You in Time).

While this particular project was well underway for a year, the group also worked on several other releases in the meantime, including The Downward Spiral: Live, a very popular release documenting of the first out of two ever live performances of The Downward Spiral in its entirety, played on August 23, 2009, at Webster Hall in New York City. This specific project earned the group the attention of the band members themselves, who all tweeted about the release, impressed by its quality. The band's art director Rob Sheridan also posted about it on the official Nine Inch Nails website on October 23, 2010.

=== Las Vegas ===
Filmed entirely by fans, over 200GB of footage was edited to document the final performance of Nine Inch Nails' 2008 tour. The video was released to the public as a free digital download in variety of formats including DVD and iPod (MP4).

This particular show is notable for being the final Nine Inch Nails performance with drummer Josh Freese until 2025 when he joined the lineup for the American leg of the Peel It Back Tour.

=== The Gift ===
Filmed in Victoria, Portland, and Sacramento by the Nine Inch Nails team, edited and produced by their fans, The Gift is presented in 1080p high-definition video with 5.1 surround sound, multi-language subtitles, and artistically-driven ethics. The video was released to the public as a free digital download in variety of formats including Blu-ray, DVD, MOV, and iPod (MP4).

=== Bonus content ===
This release includes:

1. Making-of featurettes donated by Moment Factory (the company and crew responsible for the Lights in the Sky technology).
2. Exclusive rehearsal footage, and alternate visuals to several performances.
3. Rarely performed songs from the US and South America including 32 Ghosts IV and "Down in It" (much of this material comes from the makers of other fan-made releases The Downward Spiral: Live, After All This Time (Live in Chile), and Your World On Fire (Live in Kansas City).)
4. A photo slideshow of the images donated by fans via Flickr, this also features the remix In This Twilight – Guild Remix by Samuel Trim (Bosley Beats) and Richard Evans II of Guild.
5. Highlights of Internet coverage from the era, including an Echoplex Drum Simulator and Trent Vanegas's end-of-tour interview with Reznor.

(Approximate running time for bonus material is 3 hours. Due to the variety of sources for this disc, video quality ranges from high to low resolution depending on the feature.)

== Promotion and release ==
"And as we're being told how awful BitTorrent is and how various torrent trackers and search engines need to be shut down...people are being told that they 'are encouraged to seed for as long as possible.' ...Once again, we're seeing why those who embrace what technology allows will do just fine moving forward."

— Techdirt

On December 18, the group released the final trailer for Another Version of the Truth. It was then released as three separate torrents (including PDFs) respectively on December 25, 2009, January 25, 2010 and February 25, 2010, followed by an eventual physical release in June 2010.

The initial 3-disc physical set included a 16-page booklet (including credits and project documentation), and a themed sticker and postcard. Initial demand for the 3-disc configuration far exceeded supply and the original run of 5,000 sets quickly sold out by October. In response, an affordable, single disc version (housed in a six-panel digipak), solely focusing on the band released, fan edited show (The Gift) in both DVD and Blu-ray formats is readily available.

In early December 2013, This One Is On Us announced a "limited quantity" repressing of the 3-disc set as a triple DVD digipak, which is the first time the 3-disc set has been available together and the bonus disc has been available in a non-download "pressed" format since the initial first pressing release in June 2010.

== Reception ==
To date, the group and the project has received significant attention from media outlets such as USA Today, Rolling Stone, Techdirt and Pitchfork TV, and holds the support of both the band and its fan community with theatrical screenings being held all over the world. Sheridan noted that "this is yet another example of a devoted fanbase and a policy of openness combining to fill in blanks left by old media barriers. The entire NIN camp is absolutely thrilled that treating our fans with respect and nurturing their creativity has led to such an overwhelming outpour of incredible content, and that we now have such a high quality souvenir from our most ambitious tour ever," whilst Reznor simply tweeted "Nine Inch Nails fans kick ass. Blown away."

== Track listing ==
=== Vegas ===
No.	Title	Length
1.	"999,999"	1:01
2.	"1,000,000"	4:02
3.	"Letting You"	3:55
4.	"Discipline"	4:25
5.	"March of the Pigs"	4:01
6.	"Head Down"	4:14
7.	"The Frail"	2:07
8.	"Closer (The Only Time interpolation)"	4:33
9.	"Gave Up"	4:35
10.	"Corona Radiata"	1:27
11.	"The Warning"	3:53
12.	"The Great Destroyer"	4:33
13.	"21 Ghosts III"	2:54
14.	"28 Ghosts IV"	5:08
15.	"19 Ghosts III"	2:43
16.	"Ghosts Piggy"	6:20
17.	"The Greater Good"	4:46
18.	"Pinion"	0:27
19.	"Wish"	3:38
20.	"Terrible Lie"	5:03
21.	"Survivalism"	4:30
22.	"The Big Come Down"	4:02
23.	"31 Ghosts IV"	2:31
24.	"Only"	4:50
25.	"The Hand That Feeds"	3:32
26.	"Head Like a Hole"	7:47
27.	"Echoplex"	5:57
28.	"Reptile"	6:21
29.	"Trent's Speech"	3:43
30.	"The Good Soldier"	4:01
31.	"Hurt"	5:09
32.	"In This Twilight (Zero-Sum outro)"	5:56
Total length:		134:04

=== Gift ===
No.	Title	Length
1.	"999,999"	1:31
2.	"1,000,000"	4:02
3.	"Letting You"	3:54
4.	"Discipline"	4:24
5.	"March of the Pigs"	4:03
6.	"Head Down"	4:05
7.	"The Frail"	2:14
8.	"The Wretched"	5:36
9.	"Closer (The Only Time interpolation)"	4:32
10.	"Gave Up"	4:38
11.	"Corona Radiata"	1:26
12.	"The Warning"	3:44
13.	"Vessel"	5:57
14.	"21 Ghosts III"	3:05
15.	"28 Ghosts IV"	5:05
16.	"19 Ghosts III"	2:42
17.	"Ghosts Piggy"	6:08
18.	"The Greater Good"	4:46
19.	"Pinion"	0:28
20.	"Wish"	3:38
21.	"Terrible Lie"	5:05
22.	"Survivalism"	4:25
23.	"The Big Come Down"	4:03
24.	"31 Ghosts IV"	2:30
25.	"Only"	4:49
26.	"The Hand That Feeds"	3:33
27.	"Head Like a Hole"	7:31
28.	"Echoplex (Trent's Speech appendaged)"	6:59
29.	"The Good Soldier"	3:41
30.	"God Given"	4:25
31.	"Hurt"	4:51
32.	"In This Twilight (Zero-Sum outro)"	5:58

== Personnel ==
- Trent Reznor – lead vocals, guitar, keyboard, marimba, tambourine
- Robin Finck – guitar, banjo, recorder, backing vocals
- Justin Meldal-Johnsen – bass guitar, guitar, keyboard, backing vocals
- Alessandro Cortini – keyboard, synthesizer, programming, guitar, backing vocals
- Josh Freese – Acoustic/Electronic & "Found Object" (for the "Ghosts" section of the show, exampled by using empty water cooler jugs as toms) drums
