= Rise of the Eagles =

Single by The Eighties Matchbox B-Line Disaster

from the album The Royal Society
- B-side: "Party Pooper" "We Don't Rock" "I Could Be an Angle" (demo)
- Released: 4 January 2005
- Label: No Death, Island Records
- Songwriters: Guy McKnight, Sym Gharial, Tom Diamantopoulo, Marc R. Norris, Andy Huxley

The Eighties Matchbox B-Line Disaster singles chronology
"I Could Be an Angle" (2004)	"Rise of the Eagles" (2005)	"Love Turns To Hate" (2010)

"Rise of the Eagles" is the third single from English rock band The Eighties Matchbox B-Line Disaster's second album, The Royal Society. Despite it being the third single, it was the only single released in time for the album, the previous two being released months before. In 2015 The Prodigy did a cover of the song as a bonus track on their album The Day Is My Enemy.

== Track listing ==
=== CD ===
1. "Rise of the Eagles"
2. "We Don't Rock"
3. "I Could Be an Angle" (demo)

=== Vinyl 1 ===
1. "Rise of the Eagles"
2. "Party Pooper"

=== Vinyl 2 ===
1. "Rise of the Eagles"
2. "Alchemy"

== Video ==
The video satirises the American presidency, with lead singer Guy McKnight seen in a president's suit with women lusting after him.

== Charts ==
Chart (2004)	Peak position
UK Singles (OCC)	40
UK Rock & Metal (OCC)	6
