= The Slip (album) =

Studio album by Nine Inch Nails
- Released: May 5, 2008
- Recorded: April 2008
- Genres: Industrial rock; electro-industrial
- Length: 43:45
- Label: The Null Corporation
- Producers: Trent Reznor; Atticus Ross; Alan Moulder

Nine Inch Nails chronology
Ghosts I–IV (2008)	The Slip (2008)	Hesitation Marks (2013)

Halo numbers chronology
Halo 26 (2008)	Halo 27 (2008)	Halo 28 (2013)

Singles from The Slip
- 1. "Discipline" Released: April 22, 2008

The Slip is the seventh studio album by the American industrial rock band Nine Inch Nails, released on May 5, 2008, digitally via the Nine Inch Nails website, and on CD on July 22 by The Null Corporation. It was their second release in 2008, following their sixth album Ghosts I–IV, released two months prior. The album was produced by frontman Trent Reznor with collaborators Atticus Ross and Alan Moulder.

Although originally intended to be an EP, the project was later expanded into a full-length album. Recording took place over the span of three weeks, and was described by Reznor as simply "garage electronics". Like Ghosts, the record was released under a Creative Commons (BY-NC-SA) license via the band's website for no cost, with a limited-edition physical version following two months later. The album's only single, "Discipline", was distributed by Reznor to radio stations less than 24 hours after it was mastered by Moulder.

The Slip was well received by critics, with particular praise towards its production and unorthodox method of release. The album reached number 13 on the Billboard 200, while the digital release was downloaded nearly 2 million times.

== Background and recording ==
Nine Inch Nails frontman Trent Reznor announced in 2007 that the band had completed its contractual obligations to its record label Interscope Records, and would no longer be working with the company. Reznor also revealed that Nine Inch Nails would likely distribute any future material independently. Following the announcement, Nine Inch Nails released the 36-track instrumental album Ghosts I–IV in March 2008 on Reznor's independent label The Null Corporation.

Reznor returned to writing soon after the release of Ghosts, and after a month of work, The Slip was recorded in three weeks of studio time at Trent Reznor's in-home studio. The album was engineered by Atticus Ross and mixed by Alan Moulder, both of whom co-produced it with Reznor. It was originally intended as an EP. Some instrumental performances were contributed by NIN live band members Josh Freese, Robin Finck and Alessandro Cortini, though they did not participate in the songwriting process; their contributions were limited to small parts rather than complete song recordings. During recording sessions, Reznor sent the album's first and only single, "Discipline", to radio stations before the remainder of the album was completed, and less than 24 hours after the track had been mastered. According to Reznor, the track listing and lyrics were finished on a Wednesday, the final mix and album sequencing on Thursday, the mastering on Friday, artwork on Saturday and the album was released on Sunday, May 5. Reznor reflected on the quick turnaround by saying "that was fun [...] you never could have done that before".

== Music and lyrics ==
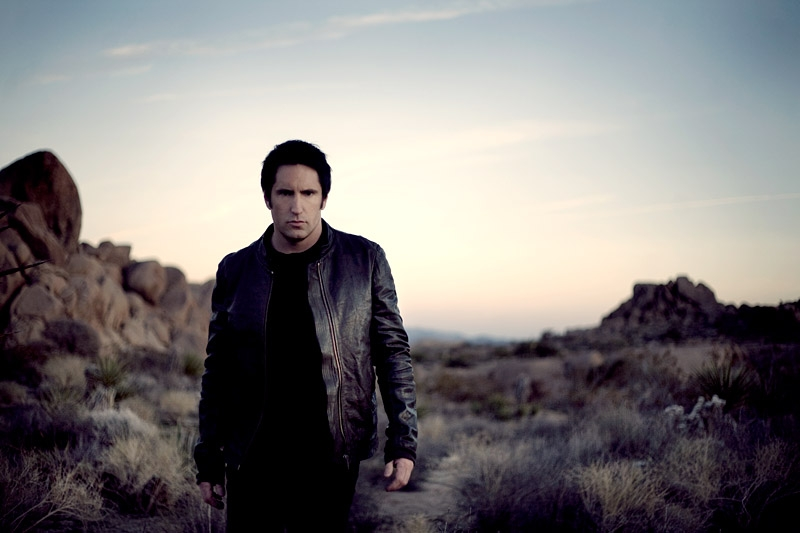
Reznor in a promotional Nine Inch Nails photo from 2008

Many critics noted how tracks on The Slip echoed musical stylings from the band's past, and that the record contained musical allusions to older Nine Inch Nails records. Anastasia Pantsios of the Cleveland Free Times said that "The Slip more or less sums up the terrain Reznor's covered in his nearly two-decade career", and went on to compare the album sound with the "edgy but irresistible beats" of Pretty Hate Machine and The Downward Spiral, and "the elusive atmospherics" of The Fragile. Jon Pareles of The New York Times wrote that "the music revives Nine Inch Nails' past, from stomping hard rock to dance-club beats to piano ballad to inexorably building instrumentals." The album's final track, "Demon Seed", directly incorporates instrumental elements from the final track of the band's previous all-instrumental album Ghosts I–IV.

Ed Thompson of IGN commented that the tracks "Discipline" and "Echoplex" channeled "bits and pieces of Depeche Mode, Bauhaus and even some Siouxsie and the Banshees". Richard Cromelin of the Los Angeles Times called The Slip "murkier and less catchy than the last couple of regular NIN albums", and added that "Reznor blends the jarring sounds of the industrial rock genre [...] with a terse, punk-like attack, bringing an insistent, sometimes claustrophobic feel to his scenarios of alienation".

Lyrically, Eric Harvey of Pitchfork compared "Discipline" to one of Nine Inch Nails's first singles, "Head Like a Hole", saying "['Discipline'] comes from a long-established and now label-free artist trying to reflexively reassert his position in the pop landscape, on his own terms. [...] 'Discipline' evinces Reznor's desire for some sort of framework [...] In relative terms, 'I need your discipline/I need your help' is sure a long way from the nearly 20-year-old 'Head Like a Hole' refrain 'I'd rather die/Than give you control'." Tom Breihan of The Village Voice reached a similar interpretation of the album's lyrical content, writing "The Slip seems to deal with Reznor's break from the corporate machine, or at least from the numbing conformity-minded forces it represents."

"Demon Seed"
Album version, as it appeared on The Slip.

In commenting on the album, Reznor described it as "a quickly assembled album", and as "more of a sketch than a painting." Reznor compared the quick assembly of The Slip to the much longer process of creating his 1999 double album The Fragile, saying that the creation of The Slip relied more on "reflexes" and that his next project would be given more "editorial time".

== Artwork ==
The artwork for "Discipline", an example of the geometric shapes of the album's visual design.

Rob Sheridan, in collaboration with Reznor, was the album's art director, as he had been for the previous three Nine Inch Nails studio albums, Ghosts I–IV (2008), Year Zero (2007), and With Teeth (2005). The downloadable version of The Slip comes with a PDF containing liner notes and album art. Like Ghosts I-IV, each track from the album is accompanied by its own graphic image, each of which consists chiefly of geometric patterns against a gray background.

== Release ==
Reznor posted on the official Nine Inch Nails website on April 21 a message saying "2 weeks!" Reznor employed a similar tactic to tease the release of the band's previous album (Ghosts I–IV) earlier the same year. The following day, Reznor released the single, "Discipline", by email to radio stations and as a free download on the official Nine Inch Nails site. The song reached numbers six and 24 on Billboard's Hot Modern Rock Tracks and Hot Mainstream Rock Tracks charts, respectively. Another song, "Echoplex", was released as a free download from iLike later. The ID3 tags of these MP3 files also pointed to the date May 5, just as Reznor's post had. On May 5, a free direct download link to the album in MP3 format was posted on the official Nine Inch Nails website, with a message from Reznor that said: "Thank you for your continued and loyal support over the years - this one's on me." The digital download is available in a variety of DRM-free audio, in both CD standard and higher resolution formats. The lyrics for each track are embedded using ID3 tags, for viewing in supported media players.

Like the previous Nine Inch Nails studio album Ghosts I–IV, The Slip was released under a Creative Commons attribution-noncommercial share-alike license, in effect allowing anyone to use or rework the material for any non-profit purpose, as long as credit is provided and the resulting work is released under a similar license. The website further expands this by saying "we encourage you to remix it, share it with your friends, post it on your blog, play it on your podcast, give it to strangers, etc." As with Ghosts I–IV and Year Zero, multi-track audio source files of the album were also made available at the official Nine Inch Nails remix site. Reznor also plans on giving away the online software and digital infrastructure through which both The Slip and Ghosts were released.

The Slip was released on CD in the United States and Canada on July 22; unlike the digital release, however, the physical version of the album was not free. The physical package was released as a six-panel digipack which contained the album itself, a 24-page booklet, a sticker pack, and a DVD with live rehearsals of "1,000,000", "Letting You", "Discipline", "Echoplex", and "Head Down". Three of these videos were featured on Pitchfork prior to the CD/DVD release. The physical release of the album was limited to 250,000 numbered units worldwide and as of December 2011 is still available. An unlimited 180-gram gatefold vinyl was released in the US and Canada on August 12, and in the United Kingdom August 18.

== Lights in the Sky tour ==
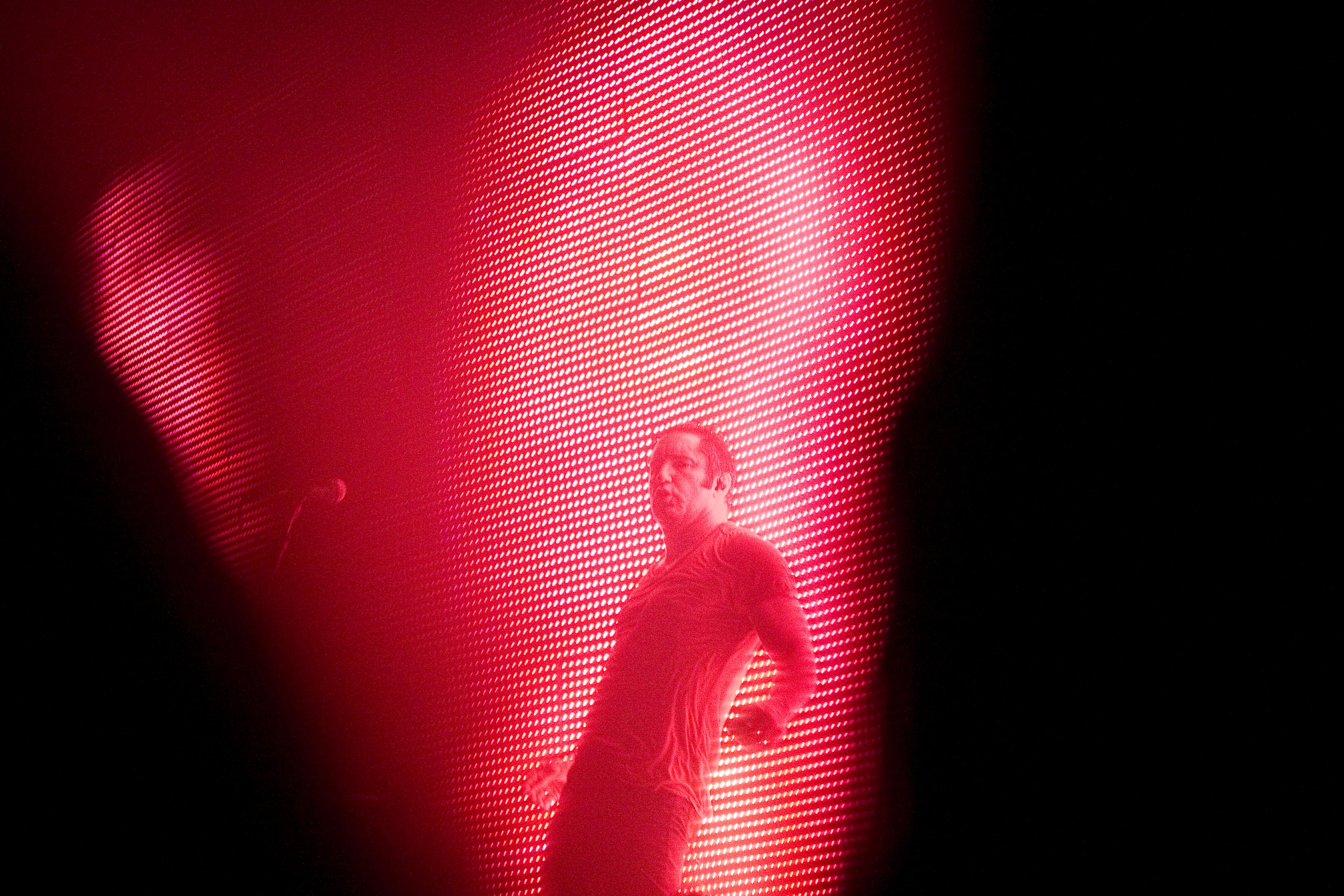
Reznor during a concert in Victoria, Canada, on the Lights in the Sky tour

Upon the release of Ghosts I–IV, a 25-date tour was announced in several North American cities. Cortini and Freese returned as members from the previous tour, while Finck rejoined the live band. The lineup was initially to include Rich Fownes, but before any scheduled performances it was revealed that Justin Meldal-Johnsen would instead be contributing on bass guitar.

Supporting acts for the tour include Deerhunter, Crystal Castles, Does It Offend You, Yeah?, Ghostland Observatory, A Place to Bury Strangers, and White Williams. On June 5, a tour EP titled Lights in the Sky: Over North America 2008 Tour Sampler was released for free on the Nine Inch Nails website featuring four songs from the supporting artists, as well as Nine Inch Nails' "Echoplex". The files are DRM-free MP3s that are fully tagged, and included with the download are desktop wallpapers and a printable tour poster.

The band headlined the 2008 Lollapalooza festival, the 2008 Virgin Festival, and the first Pemberton Festival. In May 2008, Nine Inch Nails announced that premium seating for all the upcoming 2008 tour shows would be offered in a pre-sale for fans who registered at the official Nine Inch Nails website. In an effort to combat ticket scalpers, each concert ticket will list the purchaser's legal name. The ticketing process was previously used for smaller pre-sales and was available exclusively to fan club members. On July 26, Reznor introduced an "unplugged" portion into the live show in which the band steps to the front of the stage about an hour into the show, with Reznor on vibraphone and bassist Meldal-Johnsen playing an upright bass. The 20-minute jazzy, acoustic set is taken mostly from Ghosts I - IV. The stage show also featured mesh LED curtains that projected various visuals, ranging from falling rain to static to a ruined city, and made the band appear to be playing on "a stage that appeared to be constructed entirely out of lights." Nine Inch Nails later confirmed that the tour was to extend to South America and it was thought this would be the last Americas set of dates but soon after Reznor announced yet more North American dates including two dates in Florida.

Initially, Reznor had been trying to set up a 3-D concert film intended for theatrical release to be overseen by director James Cameron. However, a dispute with the band's then-label Interscope Records led to the project being cancelled altogether. By December, a frustrated Reznor enabled a relaxed camera policy at the three remaining Lights in the Sky performances, eventually culminating in a 3-disc tour documentary created "by fans for fans" and sanctioned by the band, entitled Another Version of the Truth which was eventually released on DVD, Blu-ray, and BitTorrent formats.

== Critical reception ==
Professional ratings
Aggregate scores
Source	Rating
Metacritic	78/100
Review scores
Source	Rating
AllMusic	3/5 stars
The A.V. Club	B
Blender	4/5 stars
Consequence of Sound	3.5/5 stars
The Irish Times	3/5 stars
NME	7/10
Pitchfork	7.5/10
PopMatters	7/10
Rolling Stone	4/5 stars
Spin	4/5 stars

According to the review aggregator Metacritic, The Slip received "generally favorable reviews" based on a weighted average score of 78 out of 100 from 11 critic scores. IGN gave the album an 8.8 out of 10, stating "Simply put, The Slip is an amazing record." The Toronto Star said "[The Slip] is hardly a throwaway, this seems a sincere gift to fans." Eric Harvey of Pitchfork gave the album a 7.5 out of 10 and wrote "Reznor's unique capacity to commingle raging industrial bangers with ballads and ambient instrumental passages appears in its best form since The Downward Spiral, and here gains much of the focus and restraint that many remember used to be his calling card." Daphne Carr of LA Weekly said, "Musically, it's his most adventurous work since The Fragile, and his business model is inspired—if unsustainable." Mikael Wood of Spin complained that "a few tracks, such as 'The Four of Us Are Dying,' go on for far too long", but then said "Reznor recovers with a barn burner like 'Demon Seed'".

As with Ghosts I–IV, The Slip's unorthodox distribution methods also garnered the attention of various news agencies. An ABC News op ed questioned if consumers would "ever pay for an album again" stating "with NIN now in the game, its [sic] hard to argue that this is anything but a harbinger of the future." Commenting on the distribution of the album, Dave LaGesse of U.S. News & World Report said "The move seems an even purer play than what Radiohead did with its most recent album, In Rainbows." Jody Rosen of Rolling Stone magazine called giving away The Slip for free Reznor's "most radical stunt yet", and added that "[it's] an impressively democratic, fourth-wall-shattering gesture coming from one of music's biggest control-freak auteurs." Pitchfork's Harvey compared the release strategy of The Slip favorably to that of Ghosts I–IV and Year Zero, writing "Unlike its most immediate predecessors, The Slip comes packaged with a crucial difference: the music itself is more satisfying than the sui generis marketing scheme."

Rolling Stone named The Slip in their "Best of 2008" list, ranking the album at number 37, and named Reznor number 46 in its "100 People Who Are Changing America" list, concluding that he has "been more creative than anyone in embracing the post-CD era". Following the release of the online-releases of The Slip and Ghosts I–IV, Reznor was awarded the "Webby Artist of the Year Award" at the annual Webby Awards in 2009.

== Commercial performance ==
A month and a half after its online release, The Slip had been downloaded 1.4 million times from the official Nine Inch Nails website. The physical release of the album debuted at number 13 on the US Billboard 200, selling 29,000 copies in its first week. As of May 2013, it had sold 112,000 copies in the United States. The album also charted internationally, including number 12 on the Canadian Albums Chart, number 22 on the Australian Albums Chart, and number 25 on the UK Albums Chart.

Reznor spoke positively of the unconventional releases of Ghosts I–IV and The Slip, especially having the freedom to create with no outside influence from a record company. In an interview seven months after the album's release, Reznor said "In most ways, it feels like a blessing, because labels truly, truly have no idea what they’re doing. [...] To see that infrastructure die mainly due to their own ignorance and greed is a great thing to watch from a distance."

== Track listing ==
All tracks are written by Trent Reznor.

No.	Title	Length
1.	"999,999"	1:25
2.	"1,000,000"	3:56
3.	"Letting You"	3:49
4.	"Discipline"	4:19
5.	"Echoplex"	4:45
6.	"Head Down"	4:55
7.	"Lights in the Sky"	3:29
8.	"Corona Radiata" (instrumental)	7:33
9.	"The Four of Us Are Dying" (instrumental)	4:37
10.	"Demon Seed"	4:59
Total length:		43:45

=== Limited edition bonus DVD ===
Live from rehearsals June 2008:

1. "1,000,000" (Live)
2. "Letting You" (Live)
3. "Discipline" (Live)
4. "Echoplex" (Live)
5. "Head Down" (Live)

== Personnel ==
- Trent Reznor – writing, performance, production, art direction

=== Additional musicians ===
- Josh Freese – drums
- Robin Finck – guitar, electronics
- Alessandro Cortini – add. guitar, bass, electronics, keyboards, synthesizers

=== Technical ===
- Atticus Ross – production, engineering, programming
- Alan Moulder – production, engineering, mixing
- Michael 'Blumpy' Tuller – engineering
- Brian Gardner – mastering (at Bernie Grundman Mastering, Hollywood, California)
- Steve "Coco" Brandon – room tuning
- Rob Sheridan – art direction

=== Video content (CD/DVD version) ===
==== Nine Inch Nails live ====
- Alessandro Cortini – add. guitar, electronics, keyboards, synthesizers, programming, backing vocals
- Robin Finck – guitar, backing vocals
- Josh Freese – drums, programming
- Justin Meldal-Johnsen – bass, synthesizers, backing vocals
- Trent Reznor – vocals, guitar, keyboards, electronics

==== Technical ====
- Michael Angelos – production
- Rob Sheridan – direction, editing, camera operating
- Michael 'Blumpy' Tuller – mixing of "Letting You", "Head Down", and "Discipline"
- Ken Andrews – mixing of "1,000,000" and "Echoplex" (at Red Swan Studios)
- Mark Demarais – production managing
- Simon Thirlaway – direction of photography, camera operating
- Hilton Goring – camera operating
- Dan Bombell – camera operating
- Ethan McDonald – camera operating
- Tom Baker – mastering (at Precision Mastering, Hollywood, CA)

== Charts ==
=== Weekly charts ===
Chart (2008)	Peak position
Australian Albums (ARIA)	22
Austrian Albums (Ö3 Austria)	45
Belgian Albums (Ultratop Flanders)	34
Belgian Albums (Ultratop Wallonia)	48
Canadian Albums (Billboard)	12
Dutch Albums (Album Top 100)	54
Finnish Albums (Suomen virallinen lista)	24
French Albums (SNEP)	177
German Albums (Offizielle Top 100)	33
Irish Albums (IRMA)	40
Italian Albums (FIMI)	97
Japanese Albums (Oricon)	46
New Zealand Albums (RMNZ)	23
Norwegian Albums (VG-lista)	38
Scottish Albums (Official Charts)	28
Swedish Albums (Sverigetopplistan)	35
Swiss Albums (Schweizer Hitparade)	38
UK Albums (Official Charts)	25
UK Independent Albums (Official Charts)	1
UK Rock & Metal Albums (Official Charts)	2
US Billboard 200	13
US Independent Albums (Billboard)	1
US Top Alternative Albums (Billboard)	3
US Top Dance Albums (Billboard)	1
US Top Rock Albums (Billboard)	3

=== Year-end charts ===
Chart (2008)	Position
US Top Dance/Electronic Albums (Billboard)	13
