= The Eighties Matchbox B-Line Disaster =

British garage rock band

- Origin: Brighton, England
- Genres: Garage rock; psychobilly; gothabilly; garage punk
- Years active: 1999–2011, 2012–2013
- Labels: No Death, Black, Island
- Past members: Guy McKnight; Sym Gharial; Tom Diamantopoulo; Marc R. Norris; Andy Huxley; Rich Fownes (2005–2008); Tristan McLenahan (2008–2011); Dominic Knight (2011); Rob Ling (2012)

The Eighties Matchbox B-Line Disaster (often referred to as Eighties Matchbox, 80s Matchbox, TEMBD, TEMBLD or shortened to just Eighties or 80s) were an English garage rock band from Brighton, formed in 1999. They released three albums, Hörse of the Dög (2002), The Royal Society (2004) and Blood and Fire (2010).

== History ==
Originally formed in 1999, the band comprised Guy McKnight (vocals), Andy Huxley (lead guitar), Marc R. Norris (rhythm guitar), Symren 'Sym' Gharial (bass), and Tom Diamantopoulo (drums), until May 2005, when Andy Huxley "decided to leave due to a decrease in musical similarities" to form the band Vile Imbeciles and was replaced by Rich Fownes from With Scissors. In their first few years as a band, they were known for their large black car with red and orange flames on each side. According to Guy McKnight on MTV Two's Gonzo, the car has now gone. The band were renowned for their intense live shows, where McKnight regularly left the stage during numbers to mingle with the crowd.

They released three full-length albums, Hörse of the Dög in 2002, The Royal Society in October 2004 and Blood and Fire in May 2010. The band also released eight singles on various formats, each release has had several B-sides included, and so the band have a large number of songs that cannot be found on their albums. The song "Mister Mental" was featured in the film Shaun of the Dead, which also contained posters and other references to the band.

On rare occasions the band disguised themselves (dressed up as green bees) as a band called The Boogs, a band that had apparently signed with their old record label, No Death. They released one song as The Boogs which was a B-side on one of their singles. The song is titled "Palomino's Dream". A video was also made for the song, which featured them dressed up as green bees in New York City.

In 2003, Guy McKnight, Tom Diamantopoulo and former member Andy Huxley all became Buddhists after giving up drugs. In an interview, former member Andy Huxley was questioned about his reasons for giving up drugs he said "Because it's irresponsible, and you can't get anything done, and it stifles your creativity, and there's no benefit in it really, apart from its like going on vacation constantly, I can't write any songs when I'm on drugs, I need to be sober".

The band played at both The Glastonbury Festival and The Reading and Leeds Festivals for several years running. They also toured and supported many mainstream bands, including; System of a Down, Placebo, Klaxons, Murderdolls, Queens of the Stone Age, and Scars on Broadway.

They released the EP, "In the Garden" on 23 July 2009 on digital format, with the hard copy release being pushed back to the first week of September. The hard copy was released with a bonus live album and Ouija Board. This was the first release from the band since the departure of Huxley in May 2005. A 15 date tour took place to promote the release, starting in Manchester on 23 July 2007 and ending in London on 7 August; this was the first time the band had toured for two years. A mini tour took place during the end of 2007 and the start of 2008, with Christmas, Halloween and New Years shows.

On 7 April 2008, a few days after an announcement that Fownes was joining Nine Inch Nails, it was announced via Eighties's MySpace page that Fownes would be leaving the band. The band stated that they had no intention of splitting up and would begin auditioning for a new lead guitarist.

During gigs in July 2008, Fownes was replaced by friend of the band, Tristan McLenahan. In November 2008 McLenahann became a full member of the band. It was announced that the band were to travel to France to record their new album. In late 2009 the band posted several snippets of new material on their MySpace page, and on 15 December a re-designed MySpace page stated that they were signed across two labels; No Death and Black Records.

The band released their third studio album, Blood and Fire on 17 May 2010. It was preceded by the single "Love Turns to Hate" on 10 May 2010.

On 17 March 2011, guitarist Dominic Knight officially announced on their official Facebook page that the band had disbanded to pursue other projects.

Over a year after splitting, the band received an unexpected boost to their profile when in May 2012 their track "Chicken" was used in "My Time Is Now", a global advert for Nike Football.

In June 2012, the band announced that they would re-form with original founding members Huxley and Norris to perform their debut material at three shows.

On 13 May 2013, the band announced via their Facebook page that they decided to disband for the second time. The reason given was that no shared musical common ground was found when recording new material and that the band did not have the strength to carry on. It was also announced that members would now work individually on future projects.

Diamantopoulo left music behind and became a fine artist. He now works from his studio in Brighton creating large abstract works which are rooted in colourism and expressionism.

In 2015, The Prodigy released the album The Day Is My Enemy, which featured a cover version of the band's 2005 single "Rise of the Eagles" as a bonus track.

In 2015, Huxley and Gharial announced they had started a new project, Piano Wire, and released The Genius of the Crowd EP on Demand Vinyl. In autumn 2016, Piano Wire announced they would release their debut album Dream Underground on their own Hanging Houses record label in February 2017, along with lead single "Get a Life" produced by Gil Norton. The band broke up the following year.

In 2018, following a move to Liverpool, McKnight formed the synth-pop band The DSM IV. Their debut single "Racist Man" was released in October 2018, and was followed by further single "Funland" in January 2019, and a third single, "Killing Your Time", in March 2020.

In 2019, Norris – now based in Germany – formed The Famous Painters, releasing their debut EP "Shit Life Syndrome" that year, and follow up "Indigenous Perambulations" in October 2020.

Also in 2019, Gharial started recording under the name Primitive_Ignorant. His first two solo singles, both collaborations with Ladybug and Red Lady, were released in September and October 2019 respectively. Across 2020, Gharial released tracks from the debut Primitive_Ignorant album as singles, with the debut album "Sikh Punk" released in October of that year, and featuring collaborations with members of IDLES and The Clash.

== Band members ==
=== Band members ===
- Guy McKnight – vocals (1999–2011) (2012–2013)
- Sym Gharial – bass (1999–2011) (2012–2013)
- Marc R. Norris – rhythm guitar (1999–2010) (2012–2013)
- Andy Huxley – lead guitar (1999–2005) (2012–2013)
- Rob Ling – drums (2012–2013)

=== Previous members ===
- Tom Diamantopoulo – drums (1999–2011)
- Dominic Knight – rhythm guitar (2011)
- Tristan McLenahan– lead guitar (2008–2011)
- Rich Fownes – lead guitar (2005–2008)

=== Stand-in members ===
- Charley Hunt – bass (2008); temporarily replaced Gharial

== Discography ==
=== Albums ===
- Hörse of the Dög (20 September 2002; No Death/Island Records; UK No. 144)
- The Royal Society (25 October 2004; No Death/Island Records; UK No. 68)
- Blood and Fire (19 May 2010; No Death/Black Records; UK No. 149)

=== Singles ===
| Date of release | Title | UK Singles Chart | Album |
|---|---|---|---|
| 4 March 2002 | "Morning Has Broken" | 83 | Horse of the Dog |
| 16 September 2002 | "Celebrate Your Mother" | 66 | Horse of the Dog |
| 6 January 2003 | "Psychosis Safari" | 26 | Horse of the Dog |
| 12 May 2003 | "Chicken" | 30 | Horse of the Dog |
| 12 January 2004 | "Mister Mental" | 25 | The Royal Society |
| 28 June 2004 | "I Could Be an Angle" | 35 | The Royal Society |
| 11 October 2004 | "Rise of the Eagles" | 40 | The Royal Society |
| 10 May 2010 | "Love Turns to Hate" | – | Blood and Fire |
| 11 October 2010 | "So Long Goodnight" | – | Blood and Fire |

=== Demos, promos and EPs ===
- Original Two Track Demo (1999; No Death)
- System of a Down Tour Sampler (2005; No Death)
- In the Garden (23 July 2007; No Death)

=== DVDs ===
- Eighty Degrees of Separation (DVD)^{1}
- I Could Be an Angle (DVD)

^1This DVD was intended to promote the "Love Music Hate Racism" campaign. A small number of copies were dispatched to fans, who were instructed to pass them on to see how far they could get it. It has been said that some have reached as far as Japan and Mexico.

=== Compilation appearances ===
| Year | Song | Album |
|---|---|---|
| 2002 | "Fishfingers" | HMV Playlist, New Music – New Artist |
| 2002 | "Giant Bones" | Kerrang, The Best of 2002 |
| 2002 | "Morning Has Broken" | Sonic Mook Experiment Vol. 2 (Future Rock 'n' Roll) |
| 2002 | "Morning Has Broken" | Rock Save the Queen |
| 2003 | "Chicken" | Kerrang – Vol. 6 (High Voltage) |
| 2003 | "Whack of Shit (Demo)" | Bang on Target (Vol. 1) |
| 2003 | "Psychosis Safari" | Q The Album |
| 2003 | "Psychosis Safari" | X-Ray CD#05 |
| 2003 | "Psychosis Safari" | Sk8er Rock Vol. 1 |
| 2004 | "Psychosis Safari" | Acupuncture Rocks |
| 2004 | "Psychosis Safari" | Music from the TV drama NY-LON |
| 2004 | "Psychosis Safari" | The Music from and Inspired by Gran Turismo 4 |
| 2004 | "Mister Mental" | Shaun of the Dead Soundtrack |

==== Song title changes ====
The band changed the titles of several of their songs from the demo and touring stages to the time of release:

- "Lazy Bones" became "Giant Bones"
- "Mister Fearful" became "Mister Mental"
- "Wild Bull" became "Temple Music"
- "Clonk Chicane" became "Rise of the Eagles"
- "Race to the Rock and Roll Concert" became "The Fool"
- "Year of the Pervert" became "Freud's Black Muck"
- "Remember the Glory Years" became "When I Hear You Call My Name"
- "Wig Sister" became "I Rejection"
- "Dinner" became "Alone Again"
- "Not in the Field" became "Mission from God"
- "Someone to Eat With" and "Music for Lovemaking" became "Music to Make Love to"
- "Falling Down for You" became "Rise and Fall"

=== Videography ===
- "Morning Has Broken"
- "Celebrate Your Mother"
- "Psychosis Safari"
- "Chicken" the eighties matchbox b-line disaster - chicken
- "Palomino's Dream by the Boogs"
- "Mister Mental"
- "I Could Be an Angle"
- "Rise of the Eagles"
- "In the Garden"
- "Love Turns to Hate"
- "So Long, Goodnight"
