= No Tourists =

Studio album by the Prodigy
- Released: 2 November 2018
- Recorded: 2017–2018
- Studios: Tileyard Studios, King's Cross, London; Various locations using mobile equipment
- Length: 37:42
- Labels: Take Me to the Hospital; BMG
- Producer: Liam Howlett

The Prodigy chronology
The Day Is My Enemy (2015)	No Tourists (2018)

Singles from No Tourists
- 1. "Need Some1" Released: 19 July 2018; 2. "Light Up the Sky" Released: 26 September 2018; 3. "Fight Fire with Fire" Released: 11 October 2018; 4. "We Live Forever" Released: 25 October 2018; 5. "Timebomb Zone" Released: 6 December 2018

No Tourists is the seventh studio album by the English electronic music band the Prodigy, released on 2 November 2018, on Take Me to the Hospital, their independent label managed by BMG. The album debuted at No. 1 on the UK Albums Chart, marking their sixth consecutive studio album to achieve this feat. It ranked at No. 7 on the US Dance Albums chart and attained several Top 20 placements in other European countries.

No Tourists is the final studio album to feature Keith Flint before his death in March 2019. To support the album, the Prodigy began a world tour in November 2018. After Flint's death, the remaining tour dates were canceled.

== Background and writing ==
In July 2015, three months after the release of their previous album, The Day Is My Enemy, songwriter and producer Liam Howlett revealed the group's desire to shift their output from albums to EPs due to the lengthy production process and the need to deliver new material to fans more quickly. In 2017, Howlett began preparing new material for a proposed EP, with "Fight Fire with Fire" being the first track he worked on, co-written with the American hip-hop duo Ho99o9. The song originated as a remix that Howlett had agreed to produce for them, but the two parties decided to include it on No Tourists as it matched the "feel and flow" of the album. Howlett expressed satisfaction with the results, stating, "Once I had finished that, I was on a flow". After six months, he had ideas for six complete songs.

Despite their original intention to create an EP with various collaborators, including Dizzee Rascal, and to resume touring, Howlett noticed that the subsequent writing sessions produced strong enough material at a faster pace compared to previous Prodigy records, which influenced the decision to commit to a full album. In September 2017, the band announced that they had signed a recording deal with BMG Rights Management, granting them the green light to produce a new studio album.

Howlett believes that No Tourists displays the same level of aggression as other Prodigy albums, "but in a different way". Despite his significant contributions to the record, Howlett maintained that No Tourists is "very much a band album" and features vocal contributions from his bandmates Keith Flint and Maxim, along with collaborations with Ho99o9 and English singer-songwriter Barns Courtney. "Need Some1" was described by Howlett as a "sample, smash and grab-type of beat" and features a vocal sample from American disco singer Loleatta Holloway.

== Recording ==
The album was written, produced, and mixed by Howlett over the course of a year at Tileyard Studios in King's Cross, London. Howlett focused on the new songs with their live performance as a priority in terms of style and arrangement, aiming to include "every angle that's good about the band" in the music. He made a conscious effort to write the new material differently than he had for The Day Is My Enemy, going so far as to avoid socializing with friends and sacrificing sleep to obtain different patterns of thought and assess how it affected the creative process. He also refrained from alcohol, having consumed a significant amount during the recording of The Day Is My Enemy.

The group continued to work on the album while on tour, which included a session where Howlett aimed to capture Flint's vocals for "Champions of London" in a hotel room in Belgium after a particularly high-energy gig, utilizing portable recording equipment they traveled with. While the other band members and crew preferred to stay in higher-quality hotels, Howlett chose to "veer off and stay in a one-star that's just two miles from the gigs, just so I can get stuff done quickly". In March 2018, during the group's tour of Russia, Howlett set up a studio base in Moscow and returned to the facility after subsequent gigs to continue working on his new ideas. This setup proved to be productive for Howlett, who had close to three complete tracks by the time he left. After the album was finished, Howlett stated that making it was "the most intense studio time I've ever had" and praised the contributions of everyone involved.

== Design ==
On 19 July 2018, the album's title and front cover were revealed on the group's official Instagram page. Howlett asserted that the title was not a reference to immigration or any political message, explaining that it refers to the album's theme of escapism: "The want and need to be derailed. Don't be a tourist – there is always more danger and excitement to be found if you stray from the set path". The front cover depicts a Routemaster bus on route 7, with its destination being The Four Aces in Dalston, the location of the band's debut gig in 1990.

== Promotion ==
On 19 July 2018, the album's lead single, "Need Some1", premiered on Annie Mac on BBC Radio 1. Its music video was released on YouTube following its debut broadcast. Directed by Paco Raterta, the video was filmed in Manila. The second track, "Light Up the Sky", debuted on BBC Radio 6 on 26 September 2018, and was made available later that day. It was used in the trailer for the F1 2019 game in 2019. "Fight Fire with Fire", featuring Ho99o9, was the third single, released on 11 October 2018.

On 24 October 2018, a secret listening party was held for invited fans, who experienced the album played in full at a secret location, which turned out to be Egg London, a nightclub next to Tileyard Studios where the album was recorded. The following day, a new track called "We Live Forever" was premiered on Zane Lowe's Beats 1 show.

The Prodigy planned to support No Tourists with a world tour starting in November 2018, which included dates in the UK, Europe, Australia, New Zealand, and the US. On 4 March 2019, frontman Keith Flint was found dead at his home in Essex, just weeks after performing six live dates in Australia and New Zealand. All future tour dates were canceled on 5 March 2019.

== Release ==
No Tourists was released on 2 November 2018, in various formats, including CD, vinyl, and audio cassette.

The album debuted at No. 1 on the UK Albums Chart, with sales of 23,952 copies, including 1,828 from streaming, making it their seventh consecutive studio album to reach No. 1.

== Reception ==
Professional ratings
Aggregate scores
Source	Rating
AnyDecentMusic?	6.3/10
Metacritic	66/100
Review scores
Source	Rating
AllMusic	3/5 stars
The Guardian	3/5 stars
The Irish Times	4/5 stars
Mojo	3/5 stars
NME	5/5 stars
The Observer	4/5 stars
Pitchfork	6.2/10
Q	2/5 stars
The Times	3/5 stars
Uncut	7/10

At Metacritic, which assigns a normalized rating out of 100 to reviews from mainstream critics, the album received an average score of 66, based on 15 reviews, indicating "generally favorable reviews". In a pre-release review for AllMusic, Neil Z. Yeung gave the album three stars out of five, stating: "Much like preceding albums The Day Is My Enemy and Invaders Must Die, No Tourists leaves little space to breathe, delivering a short and sweet set of blows to the head that was designed specifically for performing live. For better or worse, there aren't many new ideas here, but main man Liam Howlett is so adept at crafting explosive body-shakers that the lack of fresh concepts can be overlooked." Ben Devlin of musicOMH rated No Tourists two stars out of five, noting the many "references, or rip-offs, of old Prodigy material" throughout and the recycling of previous Prodigy songs, which suggested to Devlin that the group was "artistically spent." Nonetheless, he considered "Give Me a Signal" a moment where "style and substance are both there, featuring an acidic 303 line and a dramatic final section." Devlin concluded: "It seems that the record saves its best for last." Mojo reviewer Ben Thompson also gave the album three stars out of five, pointing out that following an "unconvincing stab at collective irresponsibility" on The Day Is My Enemy, the latest effort from the band "marks a welcome return to unenlightened despotism." He noted that four of the album's ten tracks refer to a type of explosion. While it covers a "familiar sonic landscape", he thought that "it's also a lot of fun", highlighting "Champions of London" and the "Fuck you!" lyric of "Boom Boom Tap" as standout moments.

Jamie MacMillan for Dork magazine gave No Tourists three stars out of five, opening with: "A series of big beats in search of a big hook." He remarked that it sounds "exactly how you would expect a new album from The Prodigy in 2018 to sound," but was thankful that "it (mostly) avoids" the recycling of beats used on previous songs. To him, the album does not take off until halfway through with "Fight Fire with Fire", a song that features "one of the few moments where attitude and atmosphere really gel into something memorable," but felt disappointed that such a highlight is not repeated elsewhere. A two out of five-star review was given by Rupert Howe for Q magazine, who thought the trio "seem in need of a new adventure." While he believed "Need Some1" would satisfy the band's hardcore fans, he noted that "much of what follows sounds like he's set his overdriven synths to autopilot," with contributions from Flint and Maxim "reduced to the odd irate interjection." He praised their collaboration with Ho99o9 on "Fight Fire with Fire", but rated "Champions of London" as a "shadow of their past glories" from the 1990s.

== Track listing ==
No.	Title	Writer(s)	Length
1.	"Need Some1"	Liam Howlett; James Rushent; Arthur Baker; Gavin Christopher Wright	2:43
2.	"Light Up the Sky"	Liam Howlett; Maxim; Olly Burden; Jiří Schelinger	3:20
3.	"We Live Forever"	Liam Howlett; Robert Chetcuti; Keith Camilleri; Cedric Miller; Keith Thornton; Trevor Randolph; Maurice Smith	3:43
4.	"No Tourists"	Liam Howlett; John Du Prez; Olly Burden	4:18
5.	"Fight Fire with Fire" (featuring Ho99o9)	Liam Howlett; theOGM; Eaddy	3:29
6.	"Timebomb Zone"	Liam Howlett; Edward Chisholm; Christopher Barbosa	3:24
7.	"Champions of London"	Liam Howlett; Keith Flint; Maxim	4:49
8.	"Boom Boom Tap"	Liam Howlett; Andy Milonakis; Olly Burden	4:05
9.	"Resonate"	Liam Howlett; James Rushent	3:50
10.	"Give Me a Signal" (featuring Barns Courtney)	Liam Howlett; Barns Courtney; Olly Burden	4:01
Total length:			37:42

Samples

- "Need Some1" samples "Crash Goes Love (Yell Apella)" by Loleatta Holloway.
- "Light Up the Sky" samples "Mam Rád Lidi" by Jiří Schelinger.
- "We Live Forever" samples "Critical Beatdown" by Ultramagnetic MCs & "WTF U Lookin' At?" by South Central.
- "No Tourists" samples "Let's Get On With It" by John Du Prez, from the soundtrack to the movie 'Bullseye!'.
- "Timebomb Zone" interpolates "Time Bomb (Dub Version)" by Alfonso feat. Jimi Tunnell.
- "Boom Boom Tap" contains a sample of "2 Weeks Sober" by Andy Milonakis and "Devil" by Fernando Velázquez, from the soundtrack to the movie 'Devil'.
- "Resonate" contains samples of "Sound Killer" by Brother Culture.

== Personnel ==
The Prodigy

- Liam Howlett – writing, keyboards, synthesizers, sampling, drum programming
- Keith Flint – vocals on "We Live Forever", "Champions of London", and "Give Me a Signal"
- Maxim – vocals on "Light Up the Sky", "We Live Forever", "No Tourists", and "Champions of London"

Additional personnel

- Brother Culture – vocals on "Light Up the Sky" and "Resonate"
- Ho99o9 (Jean "theOGM" Lebrun, Lawrence "Eaddy" Eaddy) – vocals on "Fight Fire with Fire"
- Barns Courtney – vocals on "Give Me a Signal"
- Olly Burden – guitar on "Light Up the Sky", "Fight Fire with Fire", and "Champions of London"
- Leo Crabtree – live drums on "Champions of London"

Production

- Liam Howlett – production, recording, engineering, mixing
- James Rushent – production on "Need Some1" and "Resonate"
- Olly Burden – co-production on "Light Up the Sky", "Fight Fire with Fire", "Timebomb Zone", "Champions of London", "Boom Boom Tap", and "Give Me a Signal"
- Richard Adlam – sample recreation production on "Timebomb Zone"
- Hal Ritson – sample recreation production on "Timebomb Zone"
- René LaVice – additional production elements on "Champions of London"
- Robert Chetcuti and Jim Pavloff – assistance on "Need Some1"
- Rob Jevons – assistance on "Champions of London"
- Prash "Engine-Earz" Mistry – mastering (including stem mastering on "Fight Fire with Fire", "Boom Boom Tap", and "Give Me a Signal") (at FORWA3DSTUDIOS, London)
- Linden Jay – mastering assistant (at FORWA3DSTUDIOS, London)
- Luke Insect – artwork and sleeve design
- Rahul Singh – photography

== Charts ==
Chart performance for No Tourists
Chart (2018–19)	Peak position
Australian Albums (ARIA)	19
Austrian Albums (Ö3 Austria)	15
Belgian Albums (Ultratop Flanders)	30
Belgian Albums (Ultratop Wallonia)	31
Czech Albums (ČNS IFPI)	23
Dutch Albums (Album Top 100)	21
Finnish Albums (Suomen virallinen lista)	7
German Albums (Offizielle Top 100)	6
Hungarian Albums (MAHASZ)	39
Irish Albums (IRMA)	18
Italian Albums (FIMI)	57
Latvian Albums (LAIPA)	20
New Zealand Albums (RMNZ)	28
Polish Albums (ZPAV)	33
Portuguese Albums (AFP)	24
Scottish Albums (Official Charts)	3
Spanish Albums (Promusicae)	31
Swiss Albums (Schweizer Hitparade)	8
UK Albums (Official Charts)	1
UK Dance Albums (Official Charts)	1
US Top Album Sales (Billboard)	73
US Top Current Album Sales (Billboard)	60
US Top Independent Albums (Billboard)	11
US Top Dance Albums (Billboard)	7

== Certifications ==
Region	Certification	Certified units/sales
United Kingdom (BPI)	Silver	60,000^{‡}
^{‡} Sales+streaming figures based on certification alone.
