= I Could Be an Angle =

Single by The Eighties Matchbox B-Line Disaster

from the album The Royal Society
- B-side: "Ice Cream"; "Grrr"; "Royal Society"
- Released: 2004
- Label: No Death, Island
- Songwriter(s): Guy McKnight, Sym Gharial, Tom Diamantopoulo, Marc R. Norris, Andy Huxley

The Eighties Matchbox B-Line Disaster singles chronology
"Mister Mental" (2004)	"I Could Be an Angle" (2004)	"Rise of the Eagles" (2005)

"I Could Be an Angle" is the second single from English rock band The Eighties Matchbox B-Line Disaster's second album The Royal Society. The song got very strong airplay on MTV Rocks (formerly MTV2) and Kerrang! TV. The name of the song comes from a sign that a tramp was holding when they visited America, the sign read "Please give me money, you never know, I could be an angle" - an obvious misspelling of "angel".

== Track listing ==
=== CD ===
1. "I Could Be an Angle"
2. "Ice Cream"
3. "Grrr" (CD only)

=== DVD ===
1. "I Could Be an Angle"
2. "Royal Society"
3. "Mr Fearful"

The DVD also contained images moving with the song "I Could Be an Angle" playing, the video for the song was not included as the band were disappointed with the way it turned out.

== Video ==
The video shows the band playing the song at a children's birthday party. The band has said that the video did not turn out how they wanted and were disappointed with it.
