= Horse of the Dog =

Studio album by The Eighties Matchbox B-Line Disaster
- Released: 30 September 2002
- Length: 25:22
- Label: No Death; Island
- Producer: Paul Tipler

The Eighties Matchbox B-Line Disaster chronology
Horse of the Dog (2002)	The Royal Society (2004)

Horse of the Dog (stylized as Hörse Of the Dög) is the debut album by British rock band The Eighties Matchbox B-Line Disaster. It was released on 30 September 2002, on the No Death label in the UK.

The album was ranked 12th out of 20 by Kerrang! magazine as their Album of the Year in 2002.

On the 5th October 2022, in conjunction with the album marking its 20-year anniversary, it was announced that a limited edition vinyl re-released was being produced to commemorate the band's release. Also included in the bundle is a second vinyl with all B-sides from the album's singles and liner notes from Edgar Wright, who directed the music video for Psychosis Safari.

== Track listing ==
1. "Celebrate Your Mother" (McKnight & TEMBD) – 2.33
2. "Chicken" (Diamantopoulo & TEMBD) – 2.47
3. "Whack of Shit" (Huxley & TEMBD) – 2.18
4. "Psychosis Safari" (Norris & TEMBD) – 2.52
5. "Giant Bones" (Huxley & TEMBD) – 1.46
6. "Fishfingers" (Diamantopoulo & TEMBD) – 2.07
7. "Charge the Guns" (Huxley & TEMBD) – 1.25
8. "Morning Has Broken" (Huxley & TEMBD) – 2.33
9. "Team Meat" (Huxley & TEMBD) – 2.45
10. "Presidential Wave" (Huxley & TEMBD) – 4.06

=== B-sides ===
Amongst the list of B-sides below, live tracks, demo tracks and videos were also released on most of the singles from the album.

Song	Length	Release(s)
"Alex"	2:43	B-side of "Morning Has Broken"
"Return December"	2:15	B-side of "Celebrate Your Mother"
"Torrential Abuse"	2:54	B-side of "Celebrate Your Mother"
"Briefcases for Girls"	2:15	B-side of "Psychosis Safari"
"Ho Ha"	3:05	B-side of "Psychosis Safari"
"Turkish Delights of the Devil"	2:58	B-side of "Chicken"
"Horse of the Dog"	4:05	B-side of "Chicken"
"Palomino's Dream (by The Boogs)"	2:49	B-side of "Chicken"
"Sacred Metal"	4:08	B-side of "Chicken"

== Personnel ==
- Guy McKnight – vocals
- Marc Norris – guitar
- Andy Huxley – guitar
- Sym Gharial – bass
- Tom Diamantopoulo – drums
- Paul Tipler – producer
- Mat Willis – executive producer, management
- Will Bartle – recording assistant
- Jeremy Gill – mixing assistant
- Ollie Dunn – mixing assistant
- Phiesta – design
- Leigh Anne Walter – photography

== Singles ==
Date of release	Title	UK chart position
11 March 2002	"Morning Has Broken"	83
16 September 2002	"Celebrate Your Mother"	66
8 July 2003	"Psychosis Safari"	26
8 May 2003	"Chicken"	30
