= Psychosis Safari =

Single by The Eighties Matchbox B-Line Disaster

from the album Hörse of the Dög
- B-side: "Breifcases for Girls" [sic]; "Ho Ha"; "Presidential Wave (Live)"; "Celebrate Your Mother (Live)"; "Charge the Guns (Live)"; "Whack of Shit (Live)"
- Released: 8 July 2003
- Label: No Death, Island
- Songwriter(s): Guy McKnight, Sym Gharial, Tom Diamantopoulo, Marc R. Norris, Andy Huxley

The Eighties Matchbox B-Line Disaster singles chronology
"Celebrate Your Mother" (2002)	"Psychosis Safari" (2003)	"Chicken" (2003)

"Psychosis Safari" is a song by English rock band The Eighties Matchbox B-Line Disaster, released as the third single from their debut album, Hörse of the Dög. At the time this was the band's most popular single, reaching number 26 in the charts and was played regularly on music channels such as MTV Rocks (formerly MTV2 Europe) and Kerrang! TV. It was featured on the soundtrack for the 2004 video game Gran Turismo 4.

== Track listing ==
=== CD1 ===
1. "Psychosis Safari"
2. "Breifcases for Girls" [sic]
3. Presidential Wave" (Recorded Live for BBC Radio 1 Evening Session)
4. "Psychosis Safari" (Video)

=== CD2 ===
1. "Psychosis Safari"
2. "Ho Ha"
3. "Celebrate Your Mother" (Recorded Live for BBC Radio 1 Evening Session)

=== 7-track promo ===
1. "Psychosis Safari"
2. "Breifcases for Girls"
3. "Ho Ha"
4. "Presidential Wave" (Live)
5. "Celebrate Your Mother" (Live)
6. "Charge the Guns" (Demo)
7. "Whack of Shit" (Demo)

== Video ==
The video comprises the band riding over a road in their "Disaster Car", and is filmed in a "cartoony" style using red and black colours. It was directed by Edgar Wright, director of the TV series Spaced and the films Shaun of the Dead and Hot Fuzz.

== Sources ==
Gran Turismo 4 Track Listing
Link to Chart History
