= The Day Is My Enemy =

Studio album by the Prodigy
- Released: 30 March 2015
- Recorded: November 2010 – December 2014
- Studios: Tileyard Studios, London, United Kingdom; Various hotels
- Genres: Big beat; dance-punk; techno
- Length: 56:12
- Labels: Take Me to the Hospital; Cooking Vinyl; Three Six Zero/Warner Bros.
- Producers: Liam Howlett; Flux Pavilion; Neil McLellan; KillSonik; Zak H Laycock

The Prodigy chronology
World's on Fire (2011)	The Day Is My Enemy (2015)	No Tourists (2018)

Singles from The Day Is My Enemy
- 1. "Nasty" Released: 12 January 2015; 2. "Wild Frontier" Released: 23 February 2015; 3. "Wall of Death" Released: 16 March 2015; 4. "Ibiza" Released: 23 March 2015

The Day Is My Enemy is the sixth studio album by English electronic music group the Prodigy. It was released on 30 March 2015 by the record labels Take Me to the Hospital/Cooking Vinyl in the UK and Three Six Zero Music/Warner Bros. Records in the United States.

Recorded over four years, the album marks the first time that band members Maxim and Keith Flint were actively involved in the songwriting process. The album title references the Cole Porter song "All Through the Night", specifically its lyrics "the day is my enemy, the night my friend", though it was the Ella Fitzgerald version that first inspired the title track.

Given the band's general lack of interest in making albums and the time required for production, The Day Is My Enemy was speculated to be their last full-length album. However, in September 2017, the band signed a worldwide record publishing deal with BMG Rights Management and subsequently released a follow-up album, No Tourists, in 2018.

== Recording ==
The first known appearance of new material from the Prodigy came in 2011 when the band debuted new tracks during live performances. The first two of these tracks were "A.W.O.L." and "Dogbite", with 2012 bringing a new track titled "Jetfighter". Liam Howlett reiterated that the new album would be "darker" compared to their previous releases. On 3 May 2012, the tentative album title was revealed as How to Steal a Jetfighter. On 2 July 2014, the Prodigy announced that the album would be reintroduced with a brand-new name.

The second working title for the album was Rebel Radio, though it underwent another change. Howlett explained that he struggled to envision it as an album title and instead decided to make it the title of one of the album tracks.

The album was written and recorded largely while on tour, in various hotel rooms around the world, on flights, at the Prodigy's private studio at Tileyard Studios, and was mixed at SARM. Howlett noted that "violent is the word that keeps on coming up" when describing the album. The entire recording process took nearly six years, spanning multiple studios and involving a few restarts to achieve the "angry, energetic sound." Unlike previous projects, The Day Is My Enemy developed as a band album, with Flint and Maxim collaborating closely with Howlett. This led to some friction; however, Flint remarked that "four years ago we sat down and talked about where the next album was gonna go, and we knew we had to bust out the most 'band' album we could create."

== Composition ==
The album's title track was the last to be produced. In an interview with BBC Radio 6 Music, Howlett shared that the track idea emerged when his friend Olly Burden presented him with a guitar riff, which would ultimately form the track's foundation. Howlett then requested permission to use the riff during production, and the results were strong enough to make it the album opener. The track also features additional drumming by the Switzerland-based drum corps, Top Secret Drum Corps.

The song "Ibiza" (featuring Sleaford Mods) critiques superstar DJ culture. Howlett explained, "we did a gig in Ibiza, and I’m not a great fan of the place, but it isn’t an attack on the island, it’s an attack on these mindless fucking jokers that arrive in their Learjets, pull a USB stick out of their pockets, plug it in and wave their hands in the air to a pre-programmed mix".

== Promotion and release ==
On 26 January 2015, the band released the official audio for the title track, "The Day Is My Enemy", on their official YouTube channel and as a digitally downloadable promotional single. The official music video for the third single, "Wild Frontier", was released on 23 February 2015, directed by Dutch filmmaker Mascha Halberstad and animator Elmer Kaan.

"Wall of Death" was released on 16 March 2015 as a promotional single, accompanied by a lyric video. UK retailer HMV announced during the week leading up to the album's release that they would stock an exclusive EP alongside the album, primarily consisting of remixes of "Nasty" and "Wild Frontier". "Ibiza" was released as the album's third official and fifth overall single on 23 March 2015, while "Rhythm Bomb" was released as a promotional single on 25 March 2015, followed by "Get Your Fight On" as a promotional single on 26 March 2015. The music video for "Ibiza" was uploaded to the Prodigy's YouTube channel on 20 April 2015.

On the evening of 3 April 2015, the band projected images of the album cover onto several London landmarks as a form of guerrilla marketing. The cover was displayed on the Battersea Power Station, the London Overground station at Shoreditch High Street, and the Houses of Parliament, attracting notable attention from authorities. The band posted photos and videos of the event on their Facebook and Instagram pages, using a hashtag referencing their track "Their Law" from Music for the Jilted Generation.

The Day Is My Enemy was released on 30 March 2015 by the record labels Take Me to the Hospital/Cooking Vinyl in the UK and Three Six Zero Music/Warner Bros. Records in the United States.

== Reception ==
Professional ratings
Aggregate scores
Source	Rating
AnyDecentMusic?	5.7/10
Metacritic	67/100
Review scores
Source	Rating
AllMusic	3/5 stars
The Daily Telegraph	4/5 stars
The Guardian	4/5 stars
Kerrang!	5/5 stars
Mixmag	8/10
Mojo	4/5 stars
NME	8/10
Pitchfork	6.0/10
Rolling Stone	3/5 stars
Uncut	7/10

In contrast to their previous two albums, critical response to The Day Is My Enemy was positive. It currently holds an aggregate score of 67 out of 100 on Metacritic, indicating generally favorable reviews.

Kerrang! awarded the album its highest rating, describing it as "simultaneously galvanized by both a thrilling creative resurgence and the social unrest that comes when people are cocooned by a culture of fear," and called it the most exciting and angrily British album of the year. NME observed that the tracks were primarily written for live performances, but still regarded it as "the strongest and most confident Prodigy album since The Fat of the Land." Consequence of Sound highlighted "Beyond the Deathray" as the album's standout, stating that it "epitomizes this new band-focused approach, and it's probably the most beautiful track in The Prodigy's discography".

AllMusic found that the band-focused approach benefited several tracks but overall criticized the album's length, finding that at 14 tracks, it is "built for returning fan club members and not the EP-craving EDM crowd". In a more critical review, Drowned in Sound echoed similar concerns, claiming that the band "embraces their psycho circus shtick to the point of suffocation". Daryl Keating of Exclaim! was critical of the group's attempts at recapturing their old-school breakbeat sound and "awful stylistic combinations," calling the record "an embarrassing display that inevitably ends badly".

The Day Is My Enemy debuted at No. 1 on the UK Albums Chart, marking the band's sixth consecutive record to reach the top of the chart.

== Track listing ==
The Day Is My Enemy track listing
No.	Title	Writer(s)	Length
1.	"The Day Is My Enemy" (featuring Martina Topley-Bird)	Liam Howlett; Olly Burden; Cole Porter	4:24
2.	"Nasty"	Howlett; Keith Flint; Tim Hutton; Nick Halkes	4:03
3.	"Rebel Radio"	Howlett; Simon Fajemisin; Stuart Henshall; Vincent Welch; Paul Frazer; Hutton	3:52
4.	"Ibiza" (featuring Sleaford Mods)	Howlett; Jason Williamson	2:45
5.	"Destroy"	Howlett; Zak H Laycock	4:28
6.	"Wild Frontier"	Howlett; Joe Erskine; Luca Gulotta; Hutton; Halkes	4:28
7.	"Rok-Weiler"	Howlett; Flint; Henshall; Welch; Frazer	3:50
8.	"Beyond the Deathray"	Howlett; Neil McLellan	3:08
9.	"Rhythm Bomb" (featuring Flux Pavilion)	Howlett; Joshua Steele; Cheri Williams; Dwayne Richardson	4:12
10.	"Roadblox"	Howlett; Maxim	5:00
11.	"Get Your Fight On"	Howlett; Maxim; Hutton; Erskine; Gulotta; Jari Salo; Paul Malmström; Halkes	3:38
12.	"Medicine"	Howlett; Mark Hull; Maxim	3:56
13.	"Invisible Sun"	Howlett	4:16
14.	"Wall of Death"	Howlett; Burden; Flint	4:04
Total length:			56:12

iTunes bonus track
No.	Title	Writer(s)	Length
15.	"Rise of the Eagles"	The Eighties Matchbox B-Line Disaster	3:47

Expanded edition bonus content (Digital download)
No.	Title	Length
1.	"The Day Is My Enemy" (Liam H Remix featuring Dope D.O.D.)	2:53
2.	"Shut 'em Up" (The Prodigy vs Public Enemy vs Manfred Mann)	4:20
3.	"Get Your Fight On" (live at Alexandra Palace 2015)	3:49
4.	"Roadblox" (live at Sonicmania Japan 2015)	4:16
5.	"Roadblox" (The Jaguar Skills Ninja Terminator Remix)	4:19
6.	"Roadblox" (Reso Remix)	4:32
7.	"Medicine" (South Central Remix)	4:42
8.	"AWOL" (Strike One)	2:59
9.	"Nasty" (Spor Remix)	5:09
10.	"Nasty" (Zinc Remix)	4:11
11.	"Nasty" (Onen Remix)	3:57
12.	"Wild Frontier" (KillSonik Remix)	5:27
13.	"Wild Frontier" (Wilkinson Remix)	4:16
14.	"Wild Frontier" (Jesse and the Wolf Remix)	3:40
15.	"Wild Frontier" (Shadow Child VIP)	5:42
16.	"Ibiza" (instrumental)	2:45
17.	"Rebel Radio" (Proxy Remix)	5:15
18.	"Rebel Radio" (René LaVice's Start a Fucking Riot Remix)	5:05
19.	"The Day Is My Enemy" (Caspa Remix)	3:30
20.	"The Day Is My Enemy" (Chris Avantgarde Remix)	3:52
21.	"The Day Is My Enemy" (LH Edit)	3:36

Remixed/Bonus tracks (CD)
No.	Title	Length
1.	"The Day Is My Enemy" (Liam H Remix featuring Dope D.O.D.)	2:53
2.	"Shut 'em Up" (The Prodigy vs Public Enemy vs Manfred Mann)	4:20
3.	"Get Your Fight On" (live at Alexandra Palace 2015)	3:49
4.	"Roadblox" (live at Sonicmania Japan 2015)	4:16
5.	"Roadblox" (The Jaguar Skills Ninja Terminator Remix)	4:19
6.	"Roadblox" (Reso Remix)	4:32
7.	"Medicine" (South Central Remix)	4:42
8.	"AWOL" (Strike One)	2:59
9.	"Nasty" (Spor Remix)	5:09
10.	"Wild Frontier" (KillSonik Remix)	5:27
11.	"Wild Frontier" (Jesse and the Wolf Remix)	3:40
12.	"Wild Frontier" (Wilkinson Remix)	4:16
13.	"Rebel Radio" (Proxy Remix)	5:15
14.	"Rebel Radio" (René LaVice's Start a Fucking Riot Remix)	5:05
15.	"Ibiza" (instrumental)	2:45
16.	"The Day Is My Enemy" (Chris Avantgarde Remix)	3:52
17.	"The Day Is My Enemy" (Liam H Remix featuring Dope D.O.D.) (instrumental)	2:53
18.	"The Day Is My Enemy" (LH Edit)	3:36

HMV exclusive remix EP
No.	Title	Length
1.	"Wild Frontier" (KillSonik Remix)	5:19
2.	"Wild Frontier" (Jesse and the Wolf Remix)	3:38
3.	"Wild Frontier" (Wilkinson Remix)	4:08
4.	"Wild Frontier" (instrumental)	4:30
5.	"Nasty" (instrumental)	4:07
6.	"Nasty" (Spor Remix)	5:11

Japanese edition bonus tracks
No.	Title	Length
15.	"Rebel Radio" (Proxy Remix)	5:16
16.	"Wild Frontier" (KillSonik Remix)	5:17

Tour edition CD2 (Japanese only)
No.	Title	Length
1.	"AWOL" (Strike One)	2:58
2.	"Rebel Radio" (René LaVice's Start a Fucking Riot Remix)	5:08
3.	"Nasty" (Spor Remix)	5:11
4.	"The Day Is My Enemy" (Caspa Remix)	3:30
5.	"Wild Frontier" (Jesse and the Wolf Remix)	3:38
6.	"Wild Frontier" (Shadow Child Remix)	5:43
7.	"Nasty" (Onen Remix)	3:59
8.	"Nasty" (Zinc Remix)	4:13
9.	"Wild Frontier" (Wilkinson Remix)	4:18

== Personnel ==
The Prodigy

- Liam Howlett – production, writing, keyboards, synthesizers, sampling, programming, engineering, mixing; additional voices on "Wall of Death"
- Keith Flint – vocals on "Nasty", "Rebel Radio", "Ibiza", "Rok-Weiler", "Get Your Fight On", "Invisible Sun", "Wall of Death"; writing on "Nasty", "Rok-Weiler", "Wall of Death"
- Maxim – vocals on "The Day Is My Enemy", "Nasty", "Rebel Radio", "Wild Frontier", "Roadblox", "Get Your Fight On", "Medicine", "Wall of Death"; writing on "Roadblox", "Get Your Fight On", "Medicine"

Additional personnel

- Neil McLellan – additional writing on "Beyond the Deathray", co-production, engineering, mixing (all)
- Martina Topley-Bird – additional vocals on "The Day Is My Enemy"
- Paul "Dirtcandy" Jackson – additional vocals on "The Day Is My Enemy"
- Top Secret Drum Corps – live drums on "The Day Is My Enemy"
- Simon "Brother Culture" Fajemisin – additional vocals on "Nasty" and "Rebel Radio"; additional writing on "Rebel Radio"
- Tim Hutton – background vocals on "Nasty", "Rebel Radio", "Wild Frontier", "Invisible Sun"; additional writing on "Nasty", "Rebel Radio", "Wild Frontier", "Get Your Fight On"
- Black Futures (Stuart Henshall, Vincent Welch, Paul Frazer) – additional writing on "Rebel Radio" and "Rok-Weiler"; co-production on "Rok-Weiler"
- Mark Summers – sample replay producer (at SCORCCiO Sample Replays) on "Rebel Radio", "Roadblox", "Medicine", "Wall of Death"
- Jason Williamson of Sleaford Mods – vocals and additional writing on "Ibiza"
- KillSonik (Joe Erskine & Luca Gulotta) – additional writing and production on "Wild Frontier" and "Get Your Fight On"
- Zak H Laycock – additional writing and production on "Destroy"
- Rob Holliday – guitar on "Rok-Weiler"
- Joshua "Flux Pavilion" Steele – co-writing and co-production on "Rhythm Bomb"
- Mark "YT" Hull – vocals and additional writing on "Medicine"
- Cole Porter – writing on "The Day Is My Enemy" (incorporating elements of "All Through the Night")
- Olly Burden – additional writing on "The Day Is My Enemy" and "Wall of Death"
- Nick Halkes – additional writing on "Nasty", "Wild Frontier", "Get Your Fight On"
- Cheri Williams of Jomanda – original vocals and additional writing on "Rhythm Bomb" (sample taken from "Make My Body Rock 1990")
- Dwayne Richardson – additional writing on "Rhythm Bomb" (sample taken from "Make My Body Rock 1990")
- Jari Salo – additional writing on "Get Your Fight On" (sample taken from "Salami Fever")
- Paul Malmström – additional writing on "Get Your Fight On" (sample taken from "Salami Fever")
- Babaka & His Ensemble – original sample performer on "Medicine" (sample taken from "Se Makri Sofra / At a Long Table" from the album "Music of the Balkans, Vol. 2")
- The Eighties Matchbox B-Line Disaster – writing on "Rise of the Eagles"
- John Davis – mastering (at Metropolis Mastering)

== Charts ==
=== Weekly charts ===
Weekly chart performance for The Day Is My Enemy
Chart (2015)	Peak position
Australian Albums (ARIA)	8
Austrian Albums (Ö3 Austria)	10
Belgian Albums (Ultratop Flanders)	6
Belgian Albums (Ultratop Wallonia)	8
Danish Albums (Hitlisten)	32
Dutch Albums (Album Top 100)	2
Finnish Albums (Suomen virallinen lista)	7
French Albums (SNEP)	17
German Albums (Offizielle Top 100)	6
Hungarian Albums (MAHASZ)	24
Irish Albums (IRMA)	4
Italian Albums (FIMI)	19
New Zealand Albums (RMNZ)	18
Norwegian Albums (VG-lista)	17
Polish Albums (ZPAV)	7
Scottish Albums (Official Charts)	1
Swiss Albums (Schweizer Hitparade)	3
UK Albums (Official Charts)	1
UK Album Downloads (Official Charts)	2
UK Dance Albums (Official Charts)	1
US Top Dance Albums (Billboard)	2
US Billboard 200	127

=== Year-end charts ===
Year-end chart performance for The Day Is My Enemy
Chart (2015)	Position
Australian Dance Albums (ARIA)	24
Belgian Albums (Ultratop Flanders)	172
Belgian Albums (Ultratop Wallonia)	130
Dutch Albums (MegaCharts)	95
Swiss Albums (Schweizer Hitparade)	94
UK Albums (OCC)	52

== Certifications ==
Certifications for The Day Is My Enemy
Region	Certification	Certified units/sales
Russia (NFPF)	Platinum	15,000
United Kingdom (BPI)	Gold	130,764
