= Chicken (The Eighties Matchbox B-Line Disaster song) =

Single by The Eighties Matchbox B-Line Disaster

from the album Hörse of the Dög
- B-side: "Chicken"; "Palomino's Dream"; "Turkish Delights of the Devil"; "Sacred Metal"; "Horse of the Dog"; "Lazy Bones"
- Released: 8 May 2003
- Label: No Death, Island Records
- Songwriter(s): Guy McKnight, Sym Gharial, Tom Diamantopoulo, Marc R. Norris, Andy Huxley

The Eighties Matchbox B-Line Disaster singles chronology
"Psychosis Safari" (2003)	"Chicken" (2003)	"Mister Mental" (2004)

"Chicken" is a song by English rock band The Eighties Matchbox B-Line Disaster, released as the fourth single from their debut album Hörse of the Dög. It was played often on MTV Rocks (formerly MTV2 Europe) and Kerrang! TV. The cover of the single features artwork by Buzz Parker, creator of Emily Strange. The song was used in Nike's May 2012 commercial My Time Is Now.

== Track listing ==
=== CD single 1 ===
1. Chicken
2. Turkish Delights of the Devil
3. Horse of the Dog
4. Chicken (video)

=== CD single 2 ===
1. Chicken
2. Palomino's Dream (by The Boogs)
3. Sacred Metal
4. Palomino's Dream (by The Boogs) (Video)

=== 6-track promo ===
1. Chicken
2. Palomino's Dream (by The Boogs)
3. Turkish Delights of the Devil
4. Sacred Metal
5. Horse of the Dog
6. Lazy Bones (Giant bones demo)

== Video ==
The video comprises the band being unpacked from boxes and fridges by two crazed men in a dark room. The bodies are then attached to meat hooks and taped to their instruments. The two men look on excitedly as the band play. Chickens are seen walking around the floor of the room.
