= Basel Tattoo =

Annual military music show

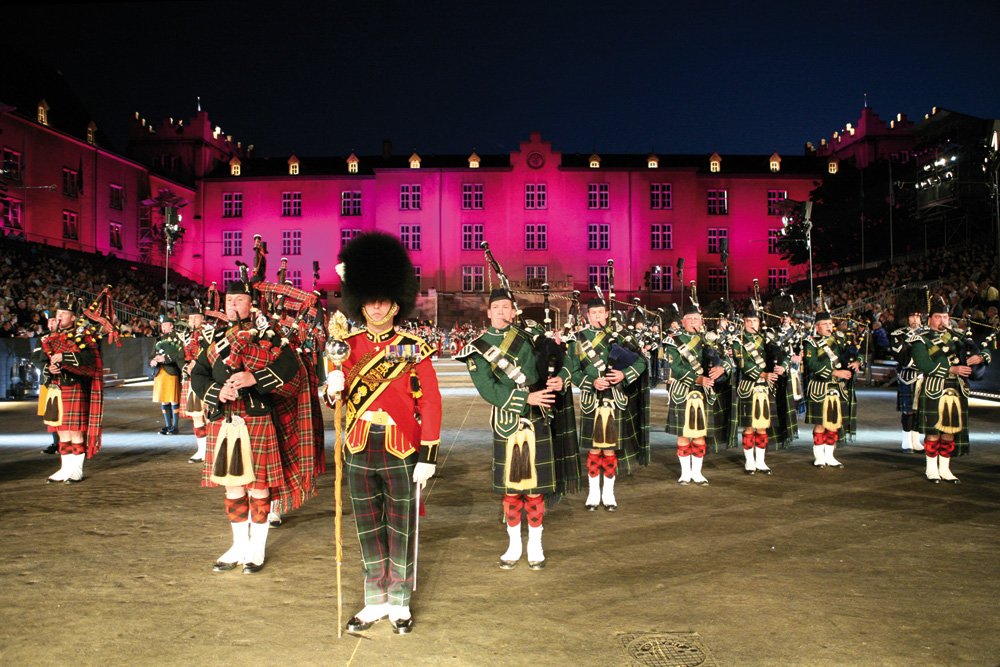
- Basel Tattoo parade in 2011
- Created by: Erik Julliard
- Starring: Top Secret Drum Corps; Blue Devils International Corps (2015)
- Country of origin: Switzerland
- No. of episodes: 15

Production
- Production locations: Basel; Switzerland
- Running time: 2 Hours

Original release
- Network: Schweizer Radio und Fernsehen
- Release: 2006 – present

Basel Tattoo is an annual military tattoo show performed by International military bands, display teams, popular musicians, and tattoo formations in Basel, Switzerland.

Since 2006, Basel Tattoo has had annual stage-arena performances within the Basel Kaserne (old barracks) (now also known as Basel Tattoo Arena) and hosts two parades in July. The Basel Tattoo parade, with an estimated 125,000 visitors, is considered the largest event.

== History ==
The Basel Tattoo was started in 2006 by the local Top Secret Drum Corps. It has grown to be the world's second largest military tattoo in terms of performers and budget after the Edinburgh Military Tattoo. The event is now sponsored by the Swiss Federal Department of Defence, Civil Protection and Sport (DDPS), making it the official military tattoo of Switzerland.

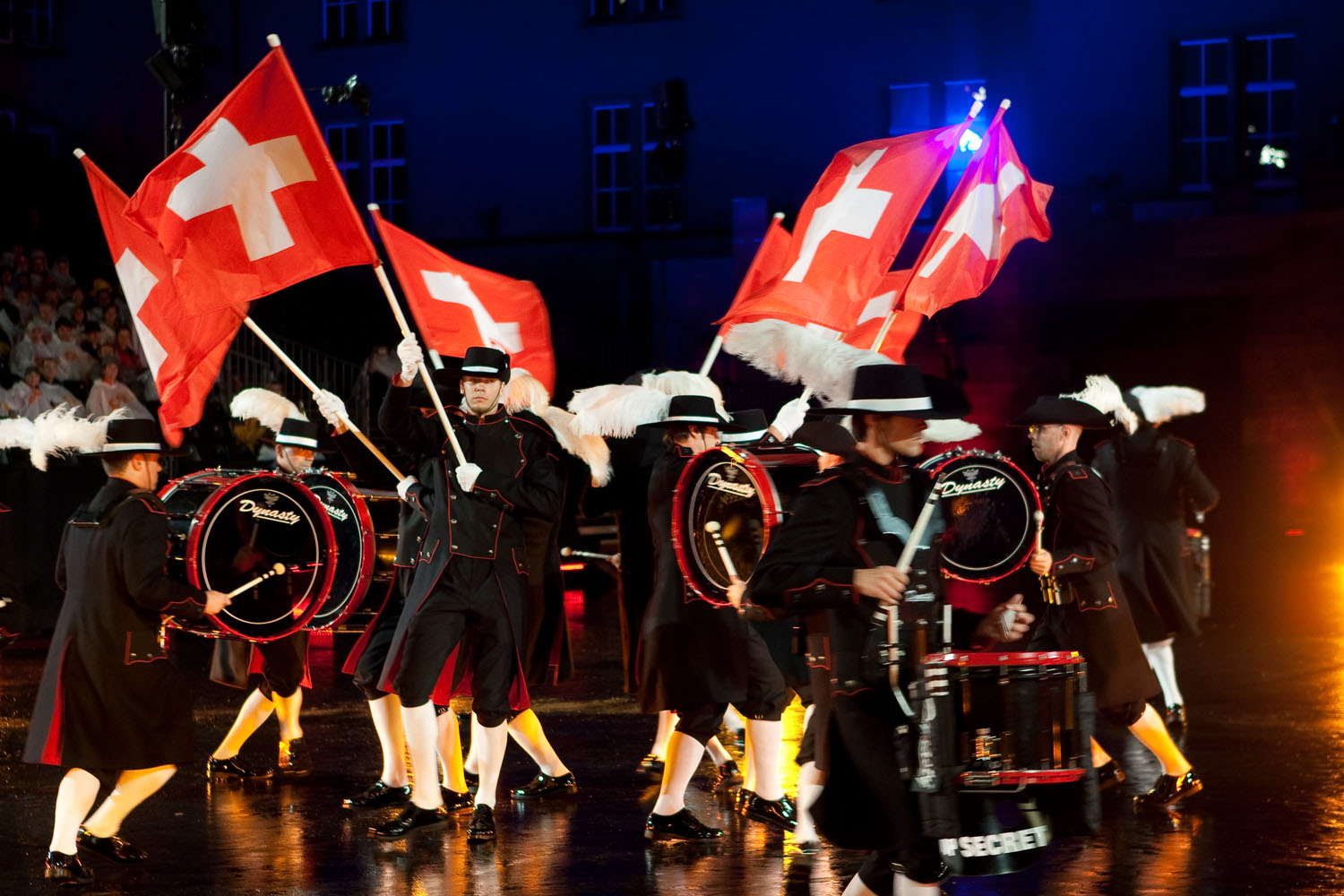
Top Secret Drum Corps at the 2009 Basel Tattoo

In 2008, the Basel Tattoo began holding a parade in Basel to showcase the performers to a wider audience. A second parade was added in Freiburg im Breisgau, Germany the following year.

In 2012, the Basel Tattoo festival had about 2,000 performers and was seen by 260,000 people during 15 live stage-arena performances and two parades.

In 2014, 120,000 spectators attended the performances at Basel Tattoo Arena, 125,000 viewed the parades in Basel and Freiburg, and 450,000 viewers watched a televised presentation on SRF 1.

In 2015, 15 arena performances in nine days featured 30 performing acts from Switzerland, Australia, Canada, Germany, Ireland, Italy, New Zealand, Oman, South Africa, South Korea, the United Kingdom (groups from England and Scotland) and the United States. One of the main highlights is expected to be the performances of the Blue Devils International Corps, a 97-member drum and bugle corps made up of alumni of the 16–time Drum Corps International (DCI) world champion Blue Devils Drum and Bugle Corps of Concord, California and eight other DCI World Class corps.
