= Rhythm Bomb =

Promotional single by The Prodigy feat. Flux Pavilion

from the album The Day Is My Enemy
- Released: 25 March 2015
- Genre: Electro house, rave, breakbeat
- Length: 4:12 (album version); 3:15 (edit)
- Label: Take Me to the Hospital, Cooking Vinyl
- Songwriter(s): Liam Howlett, Joshua Steele, Cheri Williams, Dwayne Richardson
- Producer(s): Liam Howlett, Flux Pavilion

The Prodigy singles chronology
| "Ibiza" (2015) | "Rhythm Bomb" (2015) | "Get Your Fight On" (2015) |

"Rhythm Bomb" is a promotional single released by the British electronic band the Prodigy in collaboration with the English DJ and Producer Flux Pavilion. It was released on 25 March 2015 for their album The Day Is My Enemy. The song uses a sample from the 1990 song "Make My Body Rock 1990" by Jomanda.

== Track listing ==
Single (Digital download)
| No. | Title | Length |
|---|---|---|
| 1. | "Rhythm Bomb" | 4:12 |

Remix (Digital download)
| No. | Title | Length |
|---|---|---|
| 1. | "Rhythm Bomb" (NGHTMRE Remix) | 3:12 |

Official versions

- "Rhythm Bomb" (Edit) (3:15)
