= The Royal Society (album) =

Studio album by The Eighties Matchbox B-Line Disaster
- Released: 25 October 2004
- Genre: Gothabilly; psychobilly; rockabilly; rock and roll
- Label: No Death; Island
- Producer: Chris Goss

The Eighties Matchbox B-Line Disaster chronology
| Horse of the Dog (2002) | The Royal Society (2004) | In the Garden (2007) |

Professional ratings
Aggregate scores
| Source | Rating |
|---|---|
| Metacritic | 84/100 |
Review scores
| Source | Rating |
| Drowned in Sound | 8/10 |
| The Guardian | 4/5 stars |
| NME | 8/10 |
| Playlouder | 4.5/5 stars |
| Q | 3/5 stars |
| Tiny Mix Tapes | 5/5 stars |
| Uncut | 8/10 |

The Royal Society is the second album by the British rock band The Eighties Matchbox B-Line Disaster, released in the UK on 25 October 2004 on the No Death label.

It was produced by Chris Goss of Masters of Reality. The album is a lot longer and less frantic than its immediate predecessor, showing the band's progression.

This is the last album to feature Andy Huxley on guitar.

== Track listing ==
1. "Rise of the Eagles" (Andy Huxley & TEMBLD) - 2.45
2. "I Could Be an Angle" (Tom Diamantopoulo & TEMBLD) - 3.23
3. "When I Hear You Call My Name" (Sym Gharial & TEMBLD) - 3.59
4. "Migrate Migraine" (Tom Diamantopoulo & TEMBLD) - 3.18
5. "Puppy Dog Snails" (Marc Norris & TEMBLD) - 3.54
6. "The Dancing Girls" (Tom Diamantopoulo & TEMBLD) - 3.09
7. "The Fool" (Tom Diamantopoulo & TEMBLD) - 3.08
8. "I Rejection" (Andy Huxley & TEMBLD) - 4.14
9. "Drunk on the Blood" (Tom Diamantopoulo & TEMBLD) - 5.30
10. "Mister Mental" (Tom Diamantopoulo & TEMBLD) - 2.53
11. "Freud's Black Muck" (Andy Huxley & TEMBLD) - 3.39
12. "Temple Music" (Tom Diamantopoulo & TEMBLD) - 3.10
13. "The Way Of The Men Of The Stuff" (Andy Huxley & TEMBLD) - 3.23

=== B-sides ===
Amongst the list of B-sides below, live tracks, demo versions, cover versions, remixes and videos were also released on most of the singles from the album.

| Song | Length | Release(s) |
|---|---|---|
| "6:30" | 3:01 | B-side of "Mister Mental" |
| "Flag Party" | 2:46 | B-side of "Mister Mental" |
| "Professionalism" | 2:29 | B-side of "Mister Mental" |
| "Ice Cream" | 2:24 | B-side of "I Could Be an Angle" |
| "Grrr" | 0:45 | B-side of "I Could Be an Angle" |
| "Royal Society" | 2:30 | B-side of "I Could Be an Angle" |
| "We Don't Rock" | 2:44 | B-side of "Rise of the Eagles" |
| "Party Pooper" | 2:38 | B-side of "Rise of the Eagles" |
| "Alchemy" | 3:56 | B-side of "Rise of the Eagles" |

== Personnel ==
- Guy McKnight – vocals
- Marc Norris – guitar
- Andy Huxley – guitar
- Sym Gharial – bass
- Tom Diamantopoulo – drums

== Singles ==
| Date of release | Title | Uk Top 40 chart position |
|---|---|---|
| 3 February 2004 | "Mister Mental" | 25 |
| 10 August 2004 | "I Could Be an Angle" | 35 |
| 4 January 2005 | "Rise of the Eagles" | 40 |
