= Top Secret Drum Corps =

Percussion display group from Basel, Switzerland

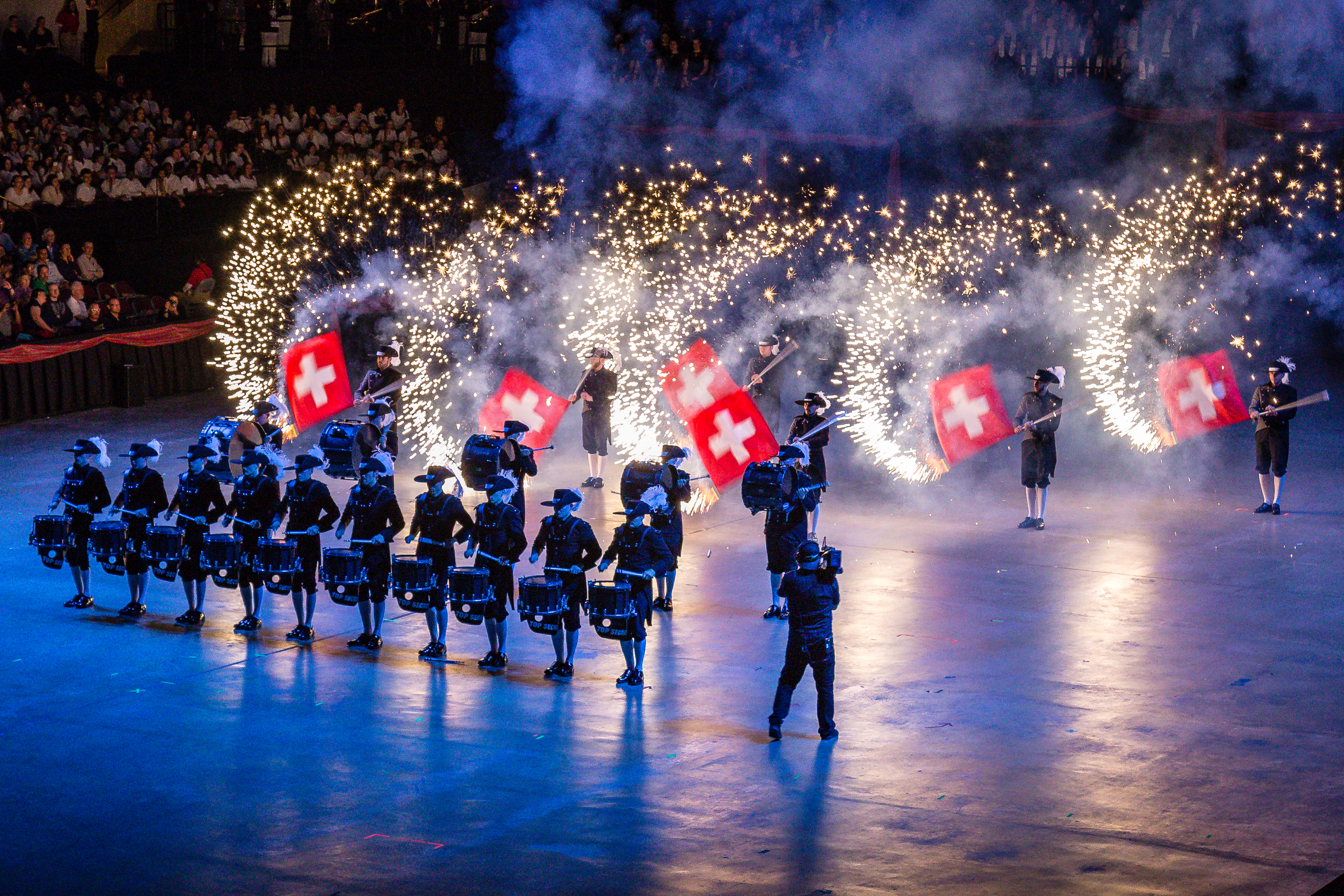
- Performing at the Virginia International Tattoo in 2016

Background information
- Genres: drum corps
- Years active: 1991–present
- Website: www.topsecretdrumcorps.com

Top Secret Drum Corps is a drum corps founded in 1991 in Basel, Switzerland. With 25 drummers and colour guard section, the corps became famous for its demanding six-minute routine performed at the Royal Edinburgh Military Tattoo in 2003. With its invitation to Edinburgh, Top Secret became one of the first non-military, non-British Commonwealth acts to perform on the Esplanade at Edinburgh Castle.

Since its success in 2003, Top Secret was invited to return to Edinburgh in 2006 with a new routine. They were invited a third time in 2009 and again in 2012, 2015, 2018, 2022 and 2025. Under the leadership of Erik Julliard, the band is also responsible for the founding of the Basel Tattoo, a military tattoo show similar to the Royal Edinburgh Military Tattoo, now held annually in Basel.

== Drumming style ==
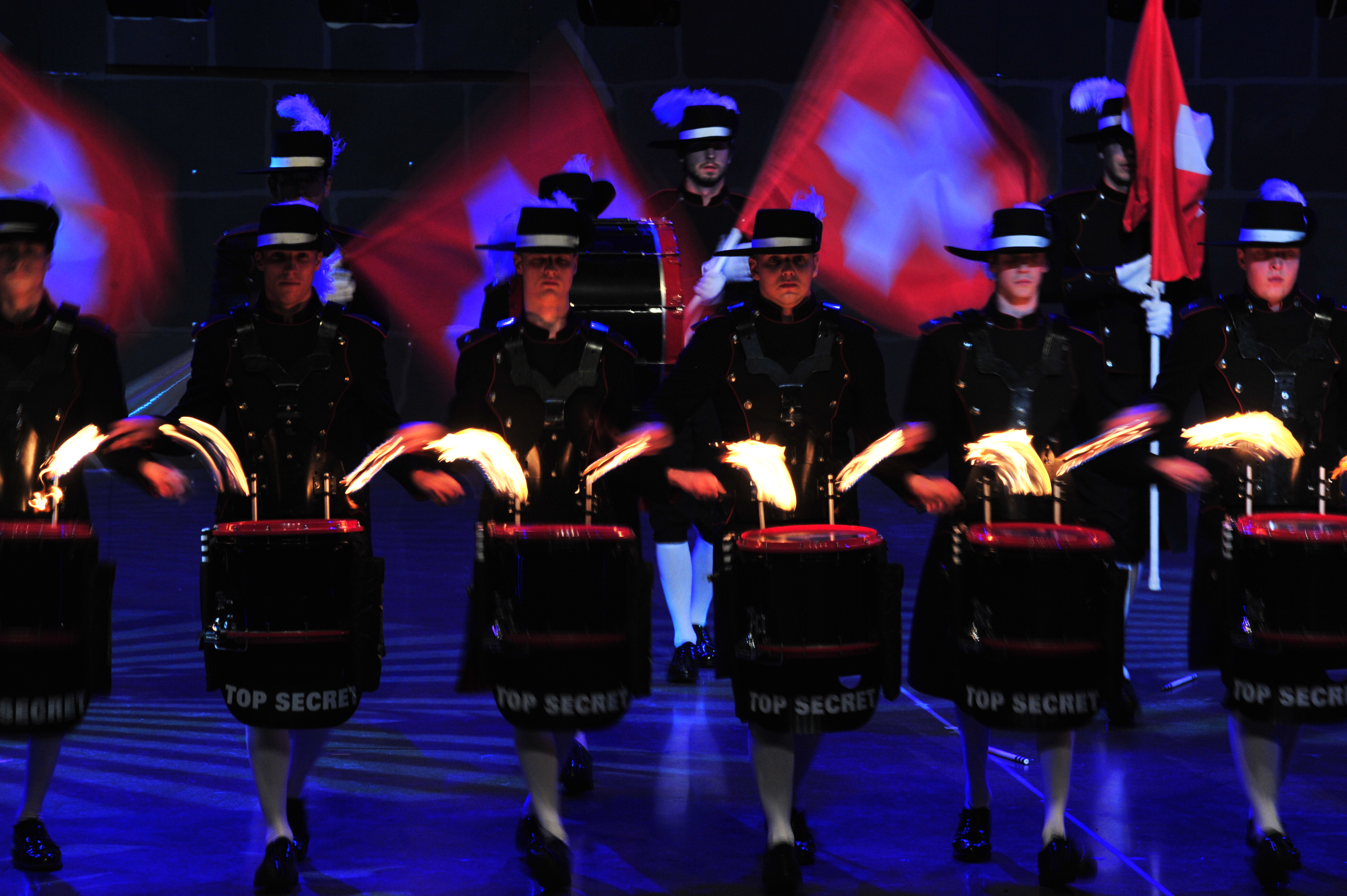
Top Secret Drum Corps performing with their 'fire-sticks'

Top Secret was founded in 1991, with its roots in the rich drumming traditions of the band's home city, Basel, which is known for its annual carnival called Basler Fasnacht. The city is said to have over 3,000 active drummers at any one time. These drummers perform at traditional events such as Fasnacht, the Vogel Gryff, Charivari, and various parades associated with the city's guilds. A Trommelkönig (Drummer King) competition is also held every year by the city's Fasnacht Committee.

Basel drumming style is militaristic, derived from the drumming drills of Swiss soldiers dating back to the Middle Ages. Top Secret in many ways adheres to the military nature of Basel drumming, but differs in many respects. Its drummers play at a much faster rate. Also, while traditional Basel drumming is somber and favors traditional marching tunes (accompanied by fifes during the Fasnacht), Top Secret's drumming style is upbeat and playful. Segments of their routines feature a rhumba, a drummer's duel, drumstick juggling, exploding flagpoles, and other crowd-pleasing details.

Likely due to their 18th-century uniforms and precision work, the band is often referred to as a military band or a part of the Swiss Army, but it is not affiliated with any military unit.

== Career ==
Since its 2003 performance at Edinburgh, Top Secret has enjoyed worldwide success. They have performed at various venues in Europe, the United States, Australia and at the 2008 South African Tattoo held from 11 to 14 September 2008. In 2011, they performed at the Quebec City Military Tattoo.

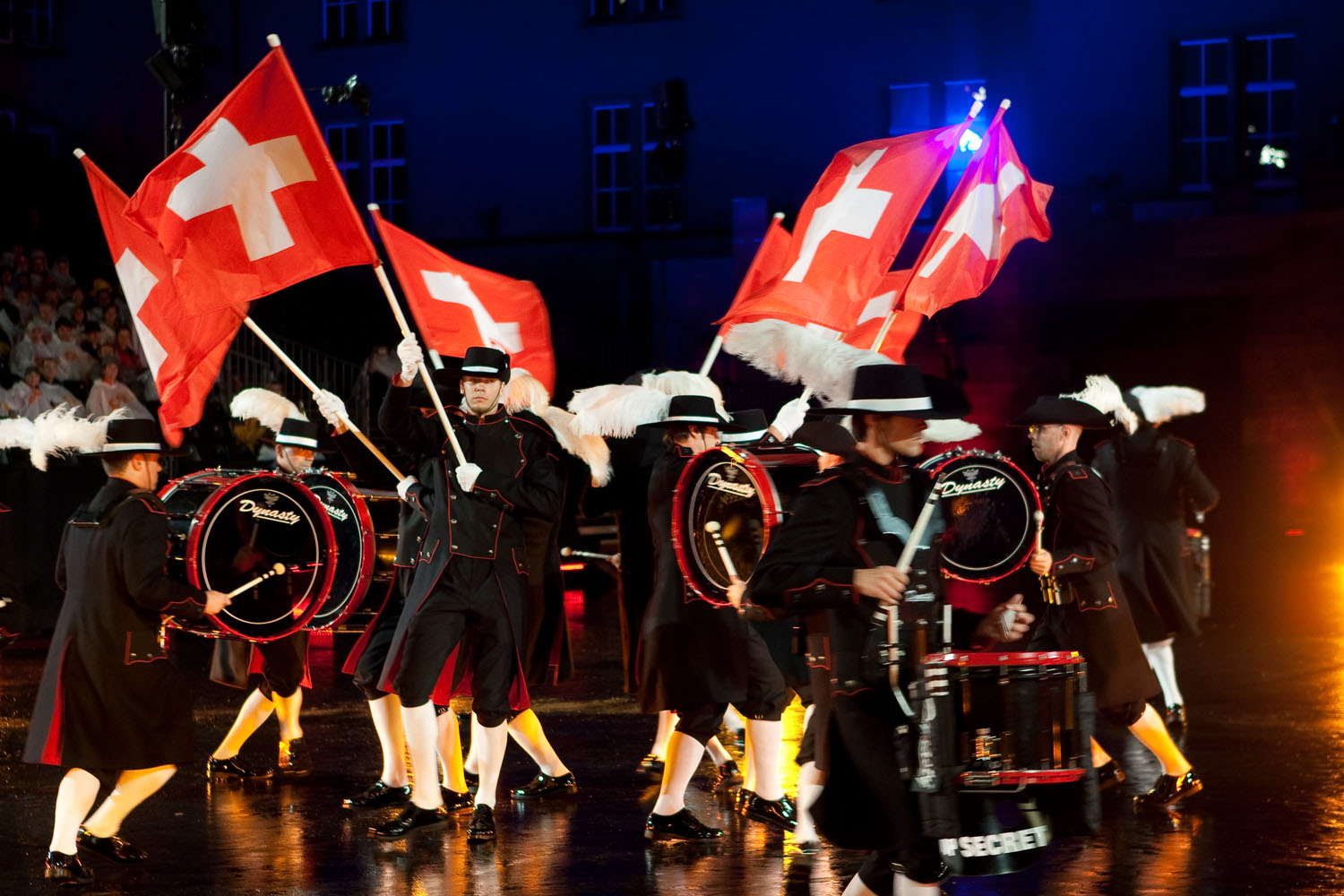
At the 2009 Basel Tattoo

External videos
- Top Secret Drum Corps at the 2009 Edinburgh Military Tattoo on YouTube
- Top Secret Drum Corps at the 2015 Edinburgh Military Tattoo on YouTube
- Top Secret Drum Corps at the 2018 Edinburgh Military Tattoo on YouTube

They are the subject of a documentary film by Swiss television which recounts their rise to fame at the Royal Edinburgh Military Tattoo. A feature film based on the Edinburgh endeavour is currently in the works with Insert Films, Switzerland.

Top Secret made an appearance on an episode of the 2014 series of Ant and Dec's Saturday Night Takeaway, as the act for the "End of the Show" show. In their routine, show presenters Ant and Dec joined in as drummers, colour-inverted versions of the drummers' jackets (Ant and Dec wore white; the drummers always wear off-black). The routine included the ever-present drummers' duel, the stick juggle, and the fire-stick routine.

A Top Secret Drum Corps drumming loop features heavily on British electronic music band The Prodigy's 2015 release "The Day Is My Enemy", which also became the title of the album released the same year. The Prodigy's founder and producer Liam Howlett is said to be a big fan of the Top Secret Drum Corps and asked permission to record a drum section for use on the band's album.

In May 2016, Top Secret Drum Corps provided one of the performances in the 90th Birthday Celebration for Elizabeth II, the Queen of the UK and 14 Commonwealth realms.

For Elizabeth II's Platinum Jubilee, the Top Secret Drum Corps performed at the pageant on 15 May 2022 and they are featured in the soundtrack of Mission: Impossible – Dead Reckoning Part One. They provided drum backing for the flag parade during the final of the Eurovision Song Contest 2025 in Basel.

== Members ==
Top Secret's members include highly dedicated drummers with diverse day jobs: bankers, civil servants, factory workers, college students, and others. They give up their leisure time to practice nearly every day of the year. Due to the demanding nature of the work, its membership changes frequently.
