= The Day Is My Enemy (song) =

2015 promotional single by The Prodigy

Promotional single by The Prodigy featuring Martina Topley-Bird and The Top Secret Drum Corps

from the album The Day Is My Enemy
- Released: 26 January 2015
- Length: 4:24 (album version); 3:36 (LH edit); 2:53 (Liam H remix ft Dope D.O.D.)
- Label: Take Me to the Hospital; Cooking Vinyl
- Songwriters: Liam Howlett; Olly Burden; Cole Porter
- Producer: Liam Howlett

The Prodigy singles chronology
"Nasty" (2015)	"The Day Is My Enemy" (2015)	"Wild Frontier" (2015)

"The Day Is My Enemy" is a promotional single released by the British electronic band The Prodigy. It was released on 26 January 2015 and is the title track of their album of the same name.

It features drums played by the Top Secret Drum Corps, a Swiss drumming group and additional vocals from Martina Topley-Bird and Paul "Dirtcandy" Jackson. The song features lyrics from the song "All Through the Night", written by Cole Porter.

It is featured in the in-game radio for Watch Dogs 2 and the final level of the mission "Robot Wars".

== Track listing ==
Digital download
No.	Title	Length
1.	"The Day Is My Enemy"	4:24

Promo Maxi CD-R
No.	Title	Length
1.	"The Day Is My Enemy" (LH Edit)	3:37
2.	"The Day Is My Enemy" (Liam H Remix feat Dope D.O.D.) (Clean)	2:55
3.	"Shut 'em Up" (vs Public Enemy vs Manfred Mann)	4:12

Official versions and remixes

- "The Day Is My Enemy" (feat. Dope D.O.D.) (Liam H Remix) (2:53)
- "The Day Is My Enemy" (Caspa Remix) (3:30)
- "The Day Is My Enemy" (Chris Avantgarde Remix) (3:52)
- "The Day Is My Enemy" (LH Edit) (3:36)
- "The Day Is My Enemy" (feat. Dope D.O.D.) (Liam H Remix) (Instrumental) (2:53)

== Charts ==
Chart (2015)	Peak position
UK Dance (Official Charts)	30
UK Singles (Official Charts)	136
