= Ibiza (The Prodigy song) =

Single by the Prodigy featuring Sleaford Mods

from the album The Day Is My Enemy
- Released: 23 March 2015
- Length: 2:45
- Label: Take Me to the Hospital; Cooking Vinyl
- Songwriters: Liam Howlett; Jason Williamson
- Producers: Liam Howlett; Neil McLellan

The Prodigy singles chronology
"Wall of Death" (2015)	"Ibiza" (2015)	"Rhythm Bomb" (2015)

Music video
- "Ibiza" on YouTube

"Ibiza" is the twenty-fourth single released by English electronic dance music band the Prodigy. It was released through the band's official YouTube channel in March 2015 as a single from their sixth album The Day Is My Enemy. The song features English hip hop duo Sleaford Mods.

== Content ==
The song is an attack against superstar DJ culture. Liam Howlett explained that "we did a gig in Ibiza, and I'm not a great fan of the place, but it isn't an attack on the island, it's an attack on these mindless fucking jokers that arrive in their Learjets, pull a USB stick out of their pockets, plug it in and wave their hands in the air to a pre-programmed mix."

The song was released as a limited edition glow-in-the-dark vinyl on Record Store Day 2015.

== Track listing ==
Digital download
No.	Title	Length
1.	"Ibiza"	2:46

7" single
No.	Title	Length
1.	"Ibiza"	2:46
2.	"Ibiza" (Instrumental)	2:46

== Charts ==
Chart performance for "Ibiza"
Chart (2015)	Peak position
UK Physical Singles (OCC)	25
