= In the Garden (EP) =

EP by The Eighties Matchbox B-Line Disaster
- Released: 23 July 2007 (digital); 3 September 2007 (hard copy)
- Recorded: April–June 2007
- Length: 10:14 (CD1); 28:40 (CD2)
- Label: Degenerate Music; No Death

The Eighties Matchbox B-Line Disaster chronology
The Royal Society (2004)	In the Garden (2007)	Blood and Fire (2010)

Professional ratings
Review scores
Source	Rating
NME	8/10 stars
Click Music	3/5 stars
Contact Music	8/10 stars
Drowned in Sound	7/10 stars

In the Garden is an extended play by English rock band The Eighties Matchbox B-Line Disaster. Released in 2007, it was the band's first release since Andy Huxley departed the band and was replaced by Rich Fownes in 2005. A 15-venue tour took place between July and August 2007 to promote the EP.

The digital format of the EP was released on 23 July 2007, with the hard copy planned to be released a week later on 30 July with a bonus ten-track live album and fold-out ouija board. However, due to unforeseen circumstances, the hard copy release was pushed back to 3 September.

== Track listing ==
1. "In the Garden" (Diamontopoulo & TEMBD) - 2:32
2. "You Say You're The Doctor But I Know You're The Mister" (Gharial & McKnight & TEMBD) - 2:40
3. "Terrible Night" (Diamontopoulo & TEMBD) - 2:49
4. "Horses Can Swim" (Norris & Fownes & TEMBD) - 2:13

=== CD2: "Live in the Arena of the Unwell" track listing ===
1. "Alex" - 2:50
2. "Team Meat" - 3:05
3. "Torrential Abuse" - 3:08
4. "Alchemy" - 4:00
5. "Turkish Delights of the Devil" - 3:08
6. "Clonk Chicane" - 2:39
7. "Ice Cream" - 2:35
8. "Flag Party" - 3:13
9. "Return December" - 2:13
10. "Charge the Guns" - 1:59
- Clonk Chicane is misspelt throughout the CD's artwork – as Clonk Chichane on the tray inlay and Clonc Chicane on the CD.

== Personnel ==
- Guy McKnight – vocals
- Marc Norris – guitars
- Rich Fownes – guitars
- Sym Gharial – bass
- Tom Diamantopoulo – drums

== Cover ==
The front cover of the EP shows four images, depicting each of the songs featured on the EP:

- The top right image shows an apple wrapped with a snake, depicting the story of Adam and Eve, the theme of "In The Garden".
- The bottom right picture shows a half horse, half fish-like creature, referring to the track "Horses Can Swim".
- The bottom left picture shows the Rod of Asclepius, an ancient Greek symbol associated with healing the sick with medicine, referring to "You Say You're The Doctor But I Know You're The Mister".
- The top left image shows a torch and a sword referring to the track "Terrible Night".
