= Mister Mental =

Single by The Eighties Matchbox B-Line Disaster

from the album The Royal Society
- B-side: "Morning Has Broken"; "6:30"; "Flag Party"; "Professionalism"; "Twentieth Century Boy"
- Released: 3 February 2004
- Label: No Death, Island
- Songwriters: Guy McKnight, Sym Gharial, Tom Diamantopoulo, Marc R. Norris, Andy Huxley

The Eighties Matchbox B-Line Disaster singles chronology
"Chicken" (2003)	"Mister Mental" (2004)	"I Could Be an Angle" (2004)

"Mister Mental" is a song by British rock band The Eighties Matchbox B-Line Disaster and the first single from their album The Royal Society. It appeared on the soundtrack for the 2004 film Shaun of the Dead.

== Track listing ==
=== CD single 1 ===
1. "Mister Mental"
2. "Morning Has Broken" (live)
3. "6:30"
4. "Mister Mental" (video)

=== CD single 2 ===
1. "Mister Mental"
2. "Flag Party"

=== Six-track promo ===
1. "Mister Mental"
2. "Morning Has Broken"
3. "6:30"
4. "Flag Party"
5. "Professionalism"
6. "Twentieth Century Boy" (Marc Bolan)

== Video ==
The video shows the band running away from an unknown substance that made their heads expand. Throughout the video the band run away from the substance until it eventually catches them, exploding their heads one by one.
