= Nasty (The Prodigy song) =

Single by the Prodigy

from the album The Day Is My Enemy
- Released: 12 January 2015
- Genre: Breakbeat, electronic rock, new rave
- Length: 4:03 (album version); 3:27 (edit)
- Label: Take Me to the Hospital, Cooking Vinyl
- Songwriter(s): Liam Howlett, Keith Flint, Tim Hutton, Nick Halkes
- Producer(s): Liam Howlett

The Prodigy singles chronology
"Take Me to the Hospital" (2009)	"Nasty" (2015)	"The Day Is My Enemy" (2015)

Music video
- "Nasty" on YouTube

"Nasty" is the twenty-second single released by the British electronic band the Prodigy. The song was released on 12 January 2015, for their upcoming album The Day Is My Enemy (to come out on 30 March). The remix EP was subsequently released on 2 February.

The single was announced on 29 December 2014, on Instagram and Facebook.

== Track listing ==
Single (Digital download)
No.	Title	Length
1.	"Nasty"	4:03

EP (Digital download)
No.	Title	Length
1.	"Nasty"	4:03
2.	"Nasty" (Zinc Remix)	4:11
3.	"Nasty" (Spor Remix)	5:09
4.	"Nasty" (Onen Remix)	3:57

Promotional CD single
No.	Title	Length
1.	"Nasty" (Edit)	3:27

Promotional CD-R single
No.	Title	Length
1.	"Nasty" (Edit)	3:46

Official versions

- "Nasty" (Instrumental) (4:07)

== Music video ==
The official music video was posted on the band's YouTube page on 12 January 2015. It features a fox getting chased in an alleyway by several hunters who are about to shoot it. The fox however puts them in a trance-like state and brings them to a forest where it turns the hunters into foxes.

== Charts ==
Chart (2015)	Peak position
UK Dance (OCC)	23
UK Singles (OCC)	98
