= Discipline (Nine Inch Nails song) =

Nine Inch Nails song

Single by Nine Inch Nails

from the album The Slip
- Released: April 22, 2008
- Recorded: April 2008
- Genre: Alternative rock; electronic rock; alternative dance; industrial rock; hard rock
- Length: 4:19
- Label: The Null Corporation
- Songwriter: Trent Reznor
- Producers: Trent Reznor; Atticus Ross; Alan Moulder

Nine Inch Nails singles chronology
"Capital G" (2007)	"Discipline" (2008)	"Came Back Haunted" (2013)

"Discipline" is a song by the American industrial rock band Nine Inch Nails from their seventh studio album, titled The Slip (2008). It was released on April 22, 2008 as the only single from the album. It is the band's first single since severing its ties with Interscope Records and publishing music independently.

The MP3 download contains an embedded album art image, full lyrics, and the comment: "Go to www.nin.com May 5". Subsequently, on May 5, 2008 a new Nine Inch Nails album, The Slip, was revealed for download. "Discipline" reached number six on Billboard's Hot Modern Rock Tracks chart and number 24 on Billboard's Hot Mainstream Rock Tracks chart, becoming Nine Inch Nails' sixth consecutive top-10 song on the former.

== Background ==
Nine Inch Nails frontman Trent Reznor announced in 2007 that the band had completed its contractual obligations to its record label, Interscope Records, and would no longer be working with the company. Reznor also revealed that Nine Inch Nails would likely distribute music independently. Since the announcement, Nine Inch Nails released the 36-track instrumental album Ghosts I–IV in March 2008 through Reznor's independent label The Null Corporation. After the release of Ghosts I–IV, Reznor began writing and recording what would become the next full-length album, The Slip.

During recording sessions for The Slip, Reznor sent the track "Discipline" to radio stations himself on April 22. The track was sent before the remainder of the album was completed, and less than 24 hours after the track had been mastered by Alan Moulder. On the same day, the track was also made available for download at the official Nine Inch Nails website for free, as well as multitrack files of the song for remixing. Reznor reflected on the quick turnaround by saying, "That was fun [...] you never could have done that before", referring to his past career on major record labels. "Discipline" was the first Nine Inch Nails single to be released independently via The Null Corporation.

== Composition ==
"Discipline" was written and composed by Reznor, who produced it with Atticus Ross and Moulder. The largely electronic instrumentation of the song has been compared to Depeche Mode, Bauhaus, Siouxsie and the Banshees, and Giorgio Moroder. Rolling Stone magazine described the track as "the closest Reznor has ever come to disco, right down to a splashing high-hat, boosted way up in the mix". Eric Harvey of Pitchfork also compared the song to disco, saying that the song "eschews a typically monstrous chorus for an airtight industrial disco grind ventilated by an airy piano and falsetto cooing."

Lyrically, Spin magazine wrote, "As is true of nine out of every ten NIN tracks, 'Discipline' is about submission and domination". Harvey compared "Discipline" to one Nine Inch Nails's first singles, "Head Like a Hole", saying "['Discipline'] comes from a long-established and now label-free artist trying to reflexively reassert his position in the pop landscape, on his own terms. [...] 'Discipline' evinces Reznor's desire for some sort of framework [...] In relative terms, 'I need your discipline/ I need your help' is sure a long way from the nearly 20-year-old 'Head Like a Hole' refrain 'I'd rather die/ Than give you control'."

== Release and reception ==
"Discipline" was released on April 22, 2008, and was the first single from The Slip. The song was also the first single released from the band under Reznor's newly formed independent label, The Null Corporation. The ID3 tag of the downloadable track came with the message "Go to www.nin.com May 5", the day that The Slip would eventually be released as a free download.

"Discipline" was only made available for airplay and download; a physical release was never issued. Though no music video was created for the song either, retail versions of The Slip included a DVD featuring a live rehearsal of the song by the Nine Inch Nails live band. The rehearsal video has since been posted on the band's official Vimeo and YouTube pages. Like the entirety of The Slip, "Discipline" was released under a Creative Commons attribution-noncommercial share-alike license, in effect allowing anyone to use or rework the material for any non-profit purpose, as long as credit is provided and the resulting work is released under a similar license.

"Discipline" reached number six and number 24 on Billboard's Hot Modern Rock Tracks and Hot Mainstream Rock Tracks charts, respectively, earning the band their sixth consecutive top-10 song on the former. The song also charted at number nine on Billboard's "iLike Libraries: Most Added" chart, which tracks total downloads over the iLike online service.

Pitchfork's review of The Slip called the track "another solid pop song about constraint from the guy who, following Prince, brought kinky sex odes to strip-mall bars." Spin magazine's review of the album called "Discipline" "the most conventional tune" from The Slip.

== Charts ==
=== Weekly charts ===
Weekly chart performance for "Discipline"
Chart (2008)	Peak position
US Alternative Airplay (Billboard)	6
US Mainstream Rock (Billboard)	24

=== Year-end charts ===
Year-end chart performance for "Discipline"
Chart (2008)	Position
US Alternative Airplay (Billboard)	33
