= Blood and Fire (album) =

Studio album by The Eighties Matchbox B-Line Disaster
- Released: 17 May 2010
- Genre: Gothabilly; psychedelic punk; psychobilly; swamp rock
- Label: No Death; Black
- Producer: Kevin Vanbergen

The Eighties Matchbox B-Line Disaster chronology
In The Garden (2007)	Blood and Fire (2010)

Professional ratings
Review scores
Source	Rating
God is in the TV Zine	7/10 stars
Rock Sound	8/10 stars
NME	7/10 stars
The Skinny	4/5 stars
Drowned in Sound	9/10 stars

Blood and Fire is the third and final album by the British rock band The Eighties Matchbox B-Line Disaster. It was released on 10 May 2010 by Black Records and the band's own label, No Death Records. It was released as a Digipak CD and as an LP on coloured vinyl with a bonus poster.

It was the band's first major album release since the departure of guitarist Andy Huxley in 2004. The album was recorded in France by the band and in London by Thomas Mitchener. Both sessions were mixed by Kevin Vanbergen. The album's first single, "Love Turns To Hate", was released on 10 May 2010 and is available as a digital download or on orange vinyl.

The album was ranked 17th out of 25 in the Best Garage Rock Albums of All Time category by the Album of the Year and it was ranked as number one in the 2010 Best Garage Rock Albums category.

== Track listing ==
1. "Love Turns to Hate" - 3.09
2. "Mission from God" - 2.36
3. "So Long Goodnight" - 4.25
4. "Under My Chin" - 2.18
5. "Riptin" - 3.25
6. "Monsieur Cutts" - 2.32
7. "I Hate the Blues" - 2.49
8. "Man for All Seasons" - 2.14
9. "Don't Ask Me to Love You" - 2.41
10. "Homemade" - 4.05
11. "Never Be the Same" - 3.21
12. "Are You Living" - 4.08

=== B-sides ===
Song	Length	Release(s)
"Shushwep"	2:25	B-side of "Love Turns To Hate"
"Labaramus"	3:16	B-side of "So Long Goodnight"

== Personnel ==
- Guy McKnight – vocals
- Marc Norris – rhythm guitar
- Tristan McLenahan – lead guitar
- Sym Gharial – bass
- Tom Diamantopoulo – drums

== Singles ==
Date of release	Title	Uk Top 40 chart position
10 May 2010	"Love Turns to Hate"	
11 October 2010	"So Long Goodnight"	
