= Rich Fownes =

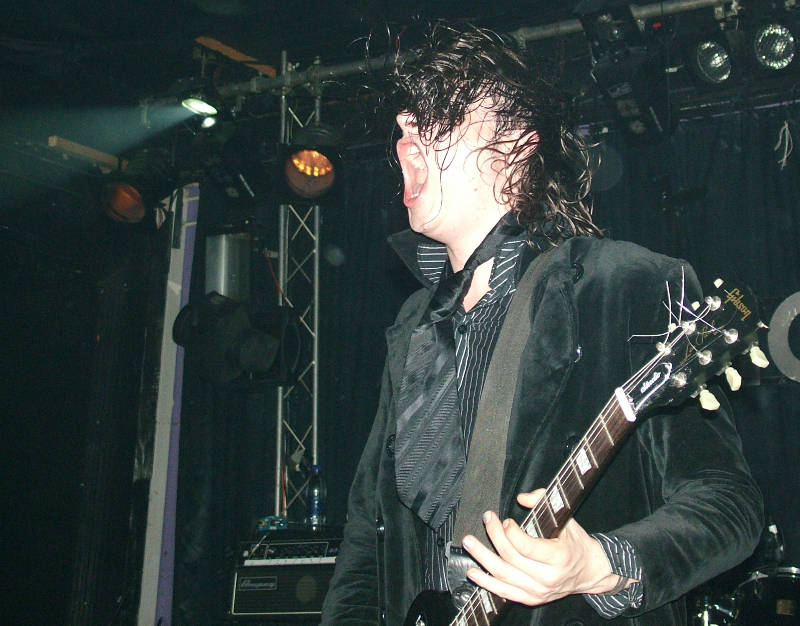

Background information
- Born: 26 October 1983 (age 42); Brighton, England
- Occupation(s): Musician, songwriter
- Instrument(s): Guitars, bass
- Years active: 2005-present

Richard Alexander Fownes (born 26 October 1983) is an English musician from Brighton. He currently plays and writes for With Scissors. He also plays live for UNKLE.

Fownes joined The Eighties Matchbox B-Line Disaster after Andy Huxley's departure in 2005, but in 2008 he left to join Nine Inch Nails. However this plan collapsed and he was replaced with Justin Meldal-Johnsen. He has since played in The Duke Spirit and Clever Thing.

In 2020, Fownes opened up to Soundsphere magazine about his departure from Nine Inch Nails, his work in Bad For Lazarus and Eighties Matchbox B-Line Disaster, alongside some new projects.

As of 2025, Fownes has been a part of the band, Not Richard and Her Majesty.
